= List of flower fly species of North America =

There are more than 870 species of flower fly (Syrphidae) in North America . The following is an attempt at a comprehensive North American list of this family of insects.

== Family Syrphidae ==
=== Subfamily Syrphinae ===
==== Tribe Bacchini ====
===== Genus Baccha Fabricius, 1805 =====
- Baccha elongata (Fabricius, 1775)

===== Genus Melanostoma Schiner, 1860 =====
- Melanostoma mellinum (Linnaeus, 1758)

===== Genus Platycheirus Lepeletier & Serville, 1828 =====
78 species

- Platycheirus aeratus
- Platycheirus albimanus
- Platycheirus alpigenus
- Platycheirus amplus
- Platycheirus angustatus
- Platycheirus brunnifrons
- Platycheirus chilosia
- Platycheirus ciliatus
- Platycheirus clausseni
- Platycheirus clypeatus
- Platycheirus coerulescens
- Platycheirus confusus (Curran, 1925)
- Platycheirus coracinus
- Platycheirus discimanus
- Platycheirus flabella
- Platycheirus granditarsus
- Platycheirus groenlandicus
- Platycheirus hesperius
- Platycheirus hispidipes
- Platycheirus hyperboreus
- Platycheirus immarginatus
- Platycheirus inversus
- Platycheirus jaerensis
- Platycheirus kelloggi
- Platycheirus latitarsis
- Platycheirus latus
- Platycheirus lundbecki
- Platycheirus luteipennis
- Platycheirus manicatus
- Platycheirus modestus
- Platycheirus meyeri
- Platycheirus naso
- Platycheirus nearcticus
- Platycheirus neoperpallidus
- Platycheirus nielseni
- Platycheirus nigrofemoratus
- Platycheirus nodosus
- Platycheirus normae
- Platycheirus orarius
- Platycheirus obscurus
- Platycheirus ocarius
- Platycheirus octavus
- Platycheirus oreadis
- Platycheirus parmatus
- Platycheirus peltatoides
- Platycheirus perpallidus
- Platycheirus pictipes
- Platycheirus pilatus
- Platycheirus podagratus
- Platycheirus protrusus
- Platycheirus pullatus
- Platycheirus quadratus
- Platycheirus rosarum
- Platycheirus rufigaster
- Platycheirus rufimaculatus
- Platycheirus russatus
- Platycheirus sabulicola
- Platycheirus scamboides
- Platycheirus scambus
- Platycheirus scutatus
- Platycheirus setipes
- Platycheirus setitarsis
- Platycheirus speighti
- Platycheirus spinipes
- Platycheirus splendidus
- Platycheirus squamulae
- Platycheirus stegnoides
- Platycheirus stegnus
- Platycheirus striatus
- Platycheirus subordinatus
- Platycheirus tenebrosus
- Platycheirus thompsoni
- Platycheirus thylax
- Platycheirus trichopus
- Platycheirus urakawensis
- Platycheirus varipes
- Platycheirus woodi
- Platycheirus yukonensis

==== Tribe Paragini ====
===== Genus Paragus Latreille =====
- Paragus arizonensis (Vockeroth, 1986)
- Paragus angustifrons (Loew, 1863)
- Paragus angustistylus (Vockeroth, 1986)
- Paragus bicolor (Fabricius, 1794)
- Paragus bispinosus (Vockeroth, 1986)
- Paragus cooverti (Vockeroth, 1986)
- Paragus haemorrhous (Meigen, 1822)
- Paragus longistylus (Vockeroth, 1986)
- Paragus tibialis (Fallén, 1817)
- Paragus variabilis (Vockeroth, 1986)

==== Tribe Pipizini ====
===== Genus Pipiza Fallén =====
- Pipiza crassipes (Bigot, 1884)
- Pipiza cribbeni (Coovert, 1996)
- Pipiza davidsoni (Curran, 1921)
- Pipiza distincta (Curran, 1921)
- Pipiza femoralis (Loew, 1866)
- Pipiza macrofemoralis (Curran, 1921)
- Pipiza nigripilosa (Williston, 1887)
- Pipiza puella ( Williston, 1887)
- Pipiza quadrimaculata (Panzer, 1802)

===== Genus Heringia Rondani, 1856 =====
- Heringia calcarata Loew, 1866
- Heringia latitarsis (Egger, 1865)

===== Genus Trichopsomyia Williston, 1888 =====
- Trichopsomyia apisaon Walker, 1849
- Trichopsomyia australis (Johnson, 1907)
- Trichopsomyia banksi (Curran, 1921)
- Trichopsomyia litoralis Vockeroth, 1988
- Trichopsomyia nigritarsis (Curran, 1924)
- Trichopsomyia occidentalis (Townsend, 1897)
- Trichopsomyia pubescens (Loew, 1863)
- Trichopsomyia recedens (Walker, 1852)
- Trichopsomyia rufithoracica (Curran, 1921)
- Trichopsomyia similis (Curran, 1924)

==== Tribe Syrphini ====
===== Genus Allograpta Osten Sacken =====
5 species

- Allograpta exotica
- Allograpta obliqua
- Allograpta micrura
- Allograpta radiata

===== Genus Chrysotoxum Meigen =====
13 species

- Chrysotoxum aztec
- Chrysotoxum chinook
- Chrysotoxum coloradensis
- Chrysotoxum derivatum
- Chrysotoxum flavifrons
- Chrysotoxum fasciatum
- Chrysotoxum integrum
- Chrysotoxum laterale
- Chrysotoxum plumeum
- Chrysotoxum pubescens
- Chrysotoxum radiosum (Shannon, 1926)
- Chrysotoxum villosulum
- Chrysotoxum ypsilon

===== Genus Dasysyrphus Enderlein =====
14 species

- Dasysyrphus amalopis
- Dasysyrphus creper
- Dasysyrphus intrudens
- Dasysyrphus laticaudus
- Dasysyrphus limatus
- Dasysyrphus lotus
- Dasysyrphus nigricornis
- Dasysyrphus occidualis
- Dasysyrphus osborni
- Dasysyrphus pacificus
- Dasysyrphus pauxillus
- Dasysyrphus pinastri
- Dasysyrphus richardi
- Dasysyrphus venustus

===== Genus Didea Macquart =====
2 species

- Didea alneti
- Didea fuscipes

===== Genus Dioprosopa Hull, 1949 =====
- Dioprosopa clavata

===== Genus Doros Meigen =====
- Doros aequalis

===== Genus Epistrophe Walker =====
- Epistrophe grossulariae
- Epistrophe metcalfi
- Epistrophe nitidicollis
- Epistrophe terminalis
- Epistrophe xanthostoma

===== Genus Epistrophella =====
- Epistrophella emarginata

===== Genus Eriozona Schiner =====
- Eriozona laxa

===== Genus Eupeodes Osten Sacken =====
21 Species

- Eupeodes americanus
- Eupeodes confertus
- Eupeodes curtus
- Eupeodes flukei
- Eupeodes fumipennis
- Eupeodes gentneri
- Eupeodes latifasciatus
- Eupeodes luniger
- Eupeodes medius
- Eupeodes montanus
- Eupeodes montivagus
- Eupeodes neoperplexus
- Eupeodes nigroventris
- Eupeodes perplexus
- Eupeodes pingreensis
- Eupeodes pomus
- Eupeodes sculleni
- Eupeodes snowi
- Eupeodes subsimus
- Eupeodes volucris

===== Genus Lapposyrphus =====
- Lapposyrphus aberrantis
- Lapposyrphus lapponicus

===== Genus Leucozona Schiner =====
- Leucozona americana
- Leucozona lucorum (Linnaeus, 1758)
- Leucozona velutina
- Leucozona xylotoides

===== Genus Melangyna Verrall =====
- Melangyna arctica
- Melangyna fisherii
- Melangyna labiatarum
- Melangyna lasiophthalma
- Melangyna subfasciata
- Melangyna triangulifera (Zetterstedt, 1843)
- Melangyna umbellatarum

===== Genus Meligramma Frey =====
- Meligramma guttata
- Meligramma triangulifera
- Meligramma vespertina

===== Genus Meliscaeva Frey =====
- Meliscaeva cinctella

===== Genus Ocyptamus Macquart =====
14 species

- Ocyptamus antiphates
- Ocyptamus costatus
- Ocyptamus cubanus
- Ocyptamus cylindricus
- Ocyptamus dimidiatus
- Ocyptamus diversifasciatus
- Ocyptamus fascipennis
- Ocyptamus fuscipennis
- Ocyptamus lemur
- Ocyptamus lineatus
- Ocyptamus parvicornis

===== Genus Orphnabaccha Vockeroth, 1969 =====
- Orphnabaccha coerulea (Williston, 1891)
- Orphnabaccha jactator (Loew, 1861)

===== Genus Parasyrphus Matsumura =====
- Parasyrphus currani (Fluke, 1935)
- Parasyrphus genualis (Williston, 1887)
- Parasyrphus groenlandicus (Nielsen, 1910)
- Parasyrphus insolitus (Osburn, 1908)
- Parasyrphus macularis (Zetterstedt, 1843)
- Parasyrphus melanderi (Curran, 1925)
- Parasyrphus nigritarsis (Zetterstedt, 1843)
- Parasyrphus relictus (Zetterstedt)
- Parasyrphus semiinterruptus (Fluke, 1935)
- Parasyrphus tarsatus (Zetterstedt, 1838)
- Parasyrphus vockerothi (Thompson, 2012)

===== Genus Philhelius =====
- Philhelius flavipes

===== Genus Salpingogaster Schiner =====
- Salpingogaster punctifrons
- Salpingogaster nepenthe

===== Genus Scaeva =====
- Scaeva pyrastri
- Scaeva selenitica

===== Genus Sphaerophoria =====
13 species

- Sphaerophoria abbreviata
- Sphaerophoria asymmetrica
- Sphaerophoria bifurcata
- Sphaerophoria brevipilosa
- Sphaerophoria contigua
- Sphaerophoria cranbrookensis
- Sphaerophoria longipilosa
- Sphaerophoria novaeanglae
- Sphaerophoria philanthus
- Sphaerophoria pyrrhina
- Sphaerophoria scripta
- Sphaerophoria sulphuripes
- Sphaerophoria weemsi

===== Genus Syrphus =====
11 species

- Syrphus attenuatus
- Syrphus currani
- Syrphus intricatus
- Syrphus knabi
- Syrphus opinator
- Syrphus rectus
- Syrphus ribesii
- Syrphus sexmaculatus
- Syrphus sonorensis
- Syrphus torvus

==== Tribe Toxomerini ====
===== Genus Toxomerus =====
23 species

- T. arcifer (Loew, 1866)
- T. bistrigus
- T. boscii Macquart, 1842
- T. corbis (Walker, 1852)
- T. dispar (Fabricius, 1794)
- T. floralis (Fabricius, 1798)
- T. geminatus (Say, 1823)
- T. jussiaeae Vige, 1939
- T. marginatus (Say, 1823)
- T. musicus
- T. mutuus
- T. norma
- T. occidentalis Curran, 1922
- T. ovatus
- T. parvulus (Loew, 1866)
- T. pictus (Macquart, 1842)
- T. politus (Say, 1823)
- T. puellus
- T. pulchellus
- T. teligera (Fluke, 1953)
- T. verticalis (Curran, 1927)
- T. virgulatus (Macquart, 1850)
- T. watsoni (Curran, 1930)

=== Subfamily Microdontinae ===
==== Genus Aristosyrphus ====
- Aristosyrphus carpenteri (Hull, 1945)
- Aristosyrphus samperi Thompson, 2008 – Colombia, Peru & Costa Rica

==== Genus Carreramyia ====
- Carreramyia megacephalus (Shannon, 1925)

==== Genus Microdon ====
29 species

- Microdon abstrusus Thompson, 1981
- Microdon adventitius Thompson, 1981
- Microdon albicomatus Novák, 1977
- Microdon aurulentus (Fabricius, 1805)
- Microdon baliopterus Loew, 1872
- Microdon coarctatus Loew, 1864
- Microdon cothurnatus Bigot, 1884
- Microdon craigheadii Walton, 1912
- Microdon diversipilosus Curran, 1925
- Microdon fulgens Wiedemann, 1830
- Microdon fuscipennis (Macquart, 1834)
- Microdon globosus (Fabricius, 1805)
- Microdon laetoides Fabricius, 1935
- Microdon laetus Loew, 1864
- Microdon lanceolatus Adams, 1903
- Microdon manitobensis Curran, 1924
- Microdon marmoratum Bigot, 1884
- Microdon megalogaster Snow, 1892
- Microdon newcomeri Mann, 1924
- Microdon ocellaris Curran, 1924
- Microdon painteri Hull, 1922
- Microdon pallipennis Curran, 1925
- Microdon piperi Knab, 1917
- Microdon ruficrus Williston 1887
- Microdon rufipes (Macquart, 1842)
- Microdon scauros Skevington & Locke, 2019
- Microdon scutifer Knab, 1917
- Microdon tristis Loew, 1864
- Microdon viridis Townsend, 1895
- Microdon xanthopilis Townsend, 1895

==== Genus Mixogaster ====
Key to North American species

- Mixogaster delongi (Hull, 1926)
- Mixogaster johnsoni (Hull, 1941)
- Mixogaster breviventris (Kahl, 1897)
- Mixogaster fattigi (Skevington & Locke, 2019)

==== Genus Omegasyrphus ====
- Omegasyrphus pallipennis (Curran, 1925)

==== Genus Peradon ====
- Peradon chrysopygus (Giglio-Tos, 1892)

==== Genus Pseudomicrodon ====
- Pseudomicrodon claripennis (Hine, 1914)

==== Genus Rhopalosyrphus ====
- Rhopalosyrphus guentherii (Lynch Arribálzaga, 1891)
- Rhopalosyrphus ramulorum Weems & Deyrup, 2003,

==== Genus Ubristes ====
- Ubristes jaguarinus Reemer, 2013

=== Subfamily Eristalinae ===
==== Tribe Brachyopini ====
===== Genus Brachyopa Meigen, 1822 =====
17 species

- Brachyopa caesariata Moran & Skevington, 2019
- Brachyopa cinereovittata Bigot, 1884
- Brachyopa cynops Snow, 1892
- Brachyopa daeckei Johnson, 1917
- Brachyopa diversa Johnson, 1917
- Brachyopa flavescens Shannon, 1915
- Brachyopa gigas Lovett, 1919
- Brachyopa media Williston, 1882
- Brachyopa notata Osten Sacken, 5[6]
- Brachyopa perplexa Curran, 1922
- Brachyopa punctipennis Curran, 1925
- Brachyopa rufiabdominalis Jones, 1917
- Brachyopa vacua Osten Sacken, 5[6]

===== Genus Chrysogaster Meigen, 1803 =====
- Chrysogaster antitheus Walker, 1849
- Chrysogaster inflatifrons Shannon, 1916

===== Genus Chrysosyrphus Sedman, 1965 =====
- Chrysosyrphus alaskensis (Shannon, 1922)
- Chrysosyrphus frontosus (Bigot, 1884)
- Chrysosyrphus latus (Loew, 1863)
- Chrysosyrphus nasuta (Zetterstedt, 1838)
- Chrysosyrphus nigripennis (Williston, 1882)

===== Genus Hammerschmidtia Schummel, 1834 =====
- Hammerschmidtia sedmani (Vockeroth, Moran & Skevington, 2019)
- Hammerschmidtia ferruginea ([Fallen, 1817)

===== Genus Myolepta =====
8 species

- Myolepta auricaudata (Williston, 1891)
- Myolepta aurinota (Hine, 1903)
- Myolepta camillae Weems, 1956
- Myolepta cornellia ([Shannon , 1923)
- Myolepta lunulata Bigot, 1884
- Myolepta nigra (Loew, 1972)
- Myolepta strigilata (Loew, 1872)
- Myolepta varipes (Loew, 1869)

===== Genus Neoascia =====
- Neoascia distincta Williston, 1887
- Neoascia geniculata (Meigen, 1822)
- Neoascia globosa (Walker, 1849)
- Neoascia metallica (Williston, 1882)
- Neoascia meticulosa (Scopoli, 1763)
- Neoascia sphaerophoria Curran, 1925
- Neoascia subchalybea Curran, 1925
- Neoascia tenur (Harris, 1780) The Black-kneed Fen Fly is a common species that was formerly considered to be only European now considered to be throughout North America and Canada.
- N. unifasciata (Strobl, 1898)
- Neoascia willistoni Thompson, 1986

===== Genus Orthonevra =====
- Orthonevra anniae (Sedman, 1966)
- Orthonevra bellula (Williston, 1882)
- Orthonevra feei (Moran & Skevington, 2019)
- Orthonevra flukei (Sedman, 1964)
- Orthonevra minuta (Hull, 1945)
- Orthonevra nigrovittata (Loew, 1876)
- Orthonevra nitida (Wiedemann, 1830)
- Orthonevra nitidula (Curran, 1925)
- Orthonevra parva (Shannon, 1916)
- Orthonevra pictipennis (Loew, 1863)
- Orthonevra pulchella (Williston, 1887)
- Orthonevra robusta (Shannon, 1916)
- Orthonevra sinuosa (Bigot, 1884)
- Orthonevra sonorensis (Shannon, 1964)
- Orthonevra stigmata (Williston, 1882)
- Orthonevra unicolor (Shannon, 1916)
- Orthonevra weemsi (Sedman, 1966)

===== Genus Sphegina =====
- Sphegina armatipes ([Malloch, 1922])
- Sphegina appalachiensis Coovert, 1977
- Sphegina biannulata Malloch, 1922
- Sphegina brachygaster Hull, 1935
- Sphegina californica (Malloch, 1922)
- Sphegina campanulata Robertson, 1901
- Sphegina flavimana Malloch, 1922
- Sphegina flavomaculata Malloch, 1922
- Sphegina infuscata (Loew, 1863)
- Sphegina keeniana Williston, 1887
- Sphegina lobata Loew, 1863
- Sphegina lobulifera Malloch, 1922
- Sphegina occidentalis (Malloch, 1922)
- Sphegina petiolata Coquillett, 1910
- Sphegina punctata (Cole, 1921)
- Sphegina rufiventris Loew, 1863

==== Tribe Callicerini ====
===== Genus Callicera =====
- Callicera duncani Curran, 1935
- Callicera erratica (Walker, 1849)
- Callicera montensis Snow, 1892

==== Tribe Cerioidini ====
===== Genus Ceriana =====
- Ceriana abbreviata Loew, 1864
- Ceriana ancoralis (Coquillett, 1902)
- Ceriana durani (Davidson, 1925)
- Ceriana mime (Hull, 1935)
- Ceriana pictula (Loew, 1853)
- Ceriana snowi (Adams, 1904)
- Ceriana tridens (Loew, 1872)
- Ceriana willistoni (Kahl, 1897)

===== Genus Monoceromyia =====
- Monoceromyia floridensis (Shannon, 1922)

===== Genus Polybiomyia =====
- Polybiomyia engelhardti (Shannon, 1925)
- Polybiomyia bellardii (Shannon, 1925)
- Polybiomyia macquarti Shannon, 1925
- Polybiomyia pedicellata (Williston, 1887)
- Polybiomyia sayi Shannon, 1925
- Polybiomyia signifera (Loew, 1853)
- Polybiomyia schnablei (Williston, 1892)
- Polybiomyia townsendi (Snow, 1895)

===== Genus Sphiximorpha =====
- Sphiximorpha cylindrica (Curran, 1921)
- Sphiximorpha loewii (Williston, 1887)

==== Tribe Eristalini ====
===== Genus Eristalinus =====
- Eristalinus aeneus Scopoli, 1844
- Eristalinus taeniops Weidemann, 1818

===== Genus Eristalis =====
- Eristalis agrorum (Weidemann), 1830
- Eristalis anthophorina (Fallén, 1817)
- Eristalis arbustorum (Linnaeus, 1758)
- Eristalis bardus (Say, 1829)
- Eristalis basilaris Macquart, 1834
- Eristalis bellardii Jeannicke, 1867)
- Eristalis brousii Williston, 1882
- Eristalis calida Walker, 1849
- Eristalis cryptarum fabricus, 1794
- Eristalis dimidiata (Weidemann, 1830)
- Eristalis dubia Macquart, 1834
- Eristalis flavipes Walker, 1849
- Eristalis fratercula (Zetterstedt, 1838)
- Eristalis gomonojunovae Violovitsh, 1977
- Eristalis hirta Loew, 1866
- Eristalis interrupta (Poda, 1761)
- Eristalis meijerei Goot, 1964
- Eristalis obscura (Loew, 1866)
- Eristalis oestracea (Linnaeus, 1758)
- Eristalis parens Bigot, 1880
- Eristalis rupium Fabricius, 1805
- Eristalis saxorum Weidemann, 1830
- Eristalis stipator Osten Sacken, 1877
- Eristalis tenax (Linnaeus, 1758) - common drone fly
- Eristalis transversa (Weidemann, 1830) - transverse flower fly

===== Genus Helophilus =====
12 species

- Helophilus bottnicus Wahlberg, 1844
- Helophilus fasciatus Walker, 1849
- Helophilus groenlandicus (Fabricius, 1780)
- Helophilus hybridus Loew, 1846
- Helophilus intentus Curran and Fluke, 1922
- Helophilus lapponicus Wahlberg, 1844
- Helophilus latifrons Loew, 1863
- Helophilus neoaffinis Fluke, 1949
- Helophilus obscurus Loew, 1863
- Helophilus oxycanus (Walker, 1852)
- Helophilus pendulus Linnaeus, 1758
- Helophilus pilosus Hunter, 1897

===== Genus Lejops =====
- Lejops annulipes (Macquart, 1850)
- Lejops billinearis (Williston, 1887)
- Lejops borealis (Cole, 1921)
- Lejops chrysostomus (Wiedemann, 1830)
- Lejops cooleyi (Seamans, 1917)
- Lejops curvipes (Wiedemann, 1830)
- Lejops distinctus (Williston, 1887)
- Lejops grisescens Hull, 1943
- Lejops lineatus (Fabricius, 1787)
- Lejops lunulatus (Meigen, 1822)
- Lejops mexicanus (Macquart, 1842)
- Lejops perfidiosus (Hunter, 1897)
- Lejops polygrammus (Loew, 1872)
- Lejops willingii (Smith, 1912)

===== Genus Mallota =====
11 species

- Mallota albipes Snow, 1895
- Mallota bautias (Walker, 1849)
- Mallota bequaerti Hull, 1956
- Mallota posticata (Fabricius, 1805)
- Mallota sackeni Williston, 1882

===== Genus Meromacrus =====
- Meromacrus acutus (fabricus, 1805)
- Meromacrus croceatus Hull, 1960
- Meromacrus draco Hull, 1942e
- Meromacrus gloriosus Hull, 1941
- Meromacrus minuticornis Thompson, 2001
- Meromacrus panamensis Curran, 1930

===== Genus Myathropa =====
- Myathropa florea

===== Genus Palpada Macquart, 1854 =====
- Palpada agrorum (Fabricius, 1787)
- Palpada albifrons (Wiedemann, 1840)
- Palpada alhambra (Hull, 1925)
- Palpada atrimana (Loew, 1866)
- Palpada furcata (Wiedemann, 1819)
- Palpada mexicana (Macquart, 1847)
- Palpada minutalis (Williston, 1891)
- Palpada pusilla (Macquart, 1842)
- Palpada ruficeps (Macquart, 1842)
- Palpada rufiventris (Macquart, 1846)
- Palpada scutellaris (Fabricius, 1805)
- Palpada texana (Hull, 1925)
- Palpada triangularis (Giglio-Tos, 1892)
- Palpada vinetorum (Fabricius, 1798)

===== Genus Parhelophilus =====
- Parhelophilus brooksi Curran, 1927
- Parhelophilus currani Fluke, 1953
- Parhelophilus divisus (Loew, 1863)
- Parhelophilus flavifacies (Bigot, 1883)
- Parhelophilus integer (Loew, 1963)
- Parhelophilus laetus (Loew, 1963)
- Parhelophilus obsoletus (Loew, 1863)
- Parhelophilus porcus (Walker, 1849)
- Parhelophilus rex Curran and Fluke, 1922

==== Tribe Sericomyiini ====
===== Genus Sericomyia =====
14 species

- Sericomyia arctica Schirmer, 1913
- Sericomyia bifasciata Williston, 1887
- Sericomyia carolinensis (Metcalf, 1917)
- Sericomyia chalcopyga Loew, 1863
- Sericomyia chrysotoxoides Macquart, 1842
- Sericomyia flagrans (Osten Sacken, )[9]
- Sericomyia harveyi (Osburn, 1908)
- Sericomyia lata (Coquillett, 1907)
- Sericomyia militaris Walker, 1849
- Sericomyia nigra Portschinsky, 1873
- Sericomyia sexfasciata Walker, 1849
- Sericomyia slossonae Curran, 1934
- Sericomyia tolli (Frey, 1915)
- Sericomyia transversa (Osburn, 1926)

===== Genus Pyritis =====
- Pyritis kincaidii

==== Tribe Merodontini ====
===== Genus Eumerus =====
- Eumerus funeralis

===== Genus Merodon =====
- Merodon equestris - Narcissus bulb fly

===== Genus Nausigaster =====
- Nausigaster texana
- Nausigaster unimaculata

==== Tribe Milesiini ====
===== Genus Blera Billberg, 1820 =====
- Blera analis (Macquart, 1842)
- Blera armillata (Osten Sacken, 1875)
- Blera badia (Walker, 1849)
- Blera confusa Johnson, 1913
- Blera flukei (Curran, 1953)
- Blera garretti (Curran, 1924)
- Blera humeralis (Williston, 1882)
- Blera johnsoni (Coquillett, 1894)
- Blera metcalfi (Curran, 1925)
- Blera nigra (Williston, 1887)
- Blera nigripes (Curran, 1925)
- Blera notata (Wiedemann, 1830)
- Blera pictipes (Bigot, 1883)
- Blera robusta (Curran, 1922)
- Blera scitula (Williston, 1887)
- Blera umbratilis (Williston, 1887)

===== Genus Brachypalpus =====
- Brachypalpus alopex (Osten Sacken, 1877)
- Brachypalpus cyanella Osten Sacken, 1877
- Brachypalpus oarus (Walker, 1849)

===== Genus Chalcosyrphus =====
- Chalcosyrphus anomalus (Shannon, 1925)
- Chalcosyrphus anthreas (Walker, 1849)
- Chalcosyrphus aristatus (Johnson, 1929)
- Chalcosyrphus curvaria (Curran, 1941)
- Chalcosyrphus depressus (Shannon, 1925)
- Chalcosyrphus dubius (Shannon, 1926)
- Chalcosyrphus flexus (Curran, 1941)
- Chalcosyrphus inarmatus (Hunter, 1897)
- Chalcosyrphus interruptus (Panzer, 1804)
- Chalcosyrphus libo (Walker, 1849)
- Chalcosyrphus metallicus (Wiedemann, 1830)
- Chalcosyrphus metallifer (Bigot, 1884)
- Chalcosyrphus nemorum (Fabricius, 1805)
- Chalcosyrphus nigromaculatus (Jones, 1917)
- Chalcosyrphus ontario (Curran, 1941)
- Chalcosyrphus parvus (Williston, 1887)
- Chalcosyrphus pauxilla (Williston, 1892)
- Chalcosyrphus piger (Fabricius, 1794)
- Chalcosyrphus plesia (Curran, 1925)
- Chalcosyrphus sacawajeae (Shannon, 1925)
- Chalcosyrphus satanica (Bigot, 1884)
- Chalcosyrphus vecors (Osten Sacken, 1875)
- Chalcosyrphus violascens (Megerle, 1803)

===== Genus Criorhina =====
14 species

- Criorhina aurea (Lovett, 1919)
- Criorhina bubulcus (Walker, 1849)
- Criorhina caudata (Curran, 1925)
- Criorhina coquilletti (Williston), 1892
- Criorhina fusca
- Criorhina kincaidi (Coquillett, 1901)
- Criorhina mystaceae (Curran, 1925)
- Criorhina nigripes (Williston, 1882)
- Criorhina nigriventris (Walton, 1911)
- Criorhina occidentalis
- Criorhina quadriboscis (Lovett, 1919)
- Criorhina tricolor (Coquillett, 1900)
- Criorhina verbosa (Walker, 1849)
- Criorhina villosa (Bigot, 1882)

===== Genus Cynorhinella =====
- Cynorhinella longinasus
- Cynorhinella bella

===== Genus Hadromyia Williston, 1882 =====
====== Subgenus Chrysosomidia Curran, 1934 ======
- Hadromyia aepalius (Walker, 1849)
- Hadromyia aldrichi (Shannon, 1916)
- Hadromyia crawfordi (Shannon, 1916)
- Hadromyia opaca (Shannon, 1916)
- Hadromyia pulchra (Williston, 1882)

====== Subgenus Hadromyia Williston, 1882 ======
- Hadromyia grandis Williston, 1882

===== Genus Merapoides =====
- Merapoides villosus

===== Genus Milesia =====
3 species

- Milesia bella (Townsend, 1897)
- Milesia scutellata (Hull, 1924)
- Milesia virginiensis (Drury, 1773)

===== Genus Palumbia =====
- Palumbia inflata (Macquart, 1834)

===== Genus Pocota =====
- Pocota bomboides Hunter, 1897

===== Genus Pterallastes Loew, 1863 =====
- Pterallastes thoracicus Loew, 1863

===== Genus Somula Macquart, 1847 =====
- Somula decora Macquart, 1847
- Somula mississippiensis Hull, 1922

===== Genus Sphecomyia =====
14 species

- Sphecomyia brevicornis (Osten Sacken, 1877)
- Sphecomyia columbiana (Vockeroth, 1965)
- Sphecomyia cryptica (Moran, 2019)
- Sphecomyia dyari (Shannon, 1925)
- Sphecomyia hoguei (Moran, 2019)
- Sphecomyia interrupta (Moran, 2019)
- Sphecomyia metallica (Bigot, 1882)
- Sphecomyia occidentalis (Osburn, 1908)
- Sphecomyia oraria (Moran, 2019)
- Sphecomyia pattonii (Williston, 1882)
- Sphecomyia pseudosphecomima (Moran, 2019)
- Sphecomyia sexfasciata (Moran, 2019)
- Sphecomyia vittata (Wiedemann, 1830)
- Sphecomyia weismani (Moran, 2019)

===== Genus Spilomyia =====
10 species

- Spilomyia alcimus (Walker, 1849)
- Spilomyia citima Vockeroth, 1958
- Spilomyia crandalli Curran, 1951
- Spilomyia foxleei Vockeroth, 1958
- Spilomyia fusca Loew, 1864
- Spilomyia interrupta Williston, 1882
- Spilomyia kahli Snow, 1895
- Spilomyia liturata Williston, 1887
- Spilomyia longicornis Loew, 1872
- Spilomyia sayi (Goot, 1964)

===== Genus Syritta =====
- Syritta pipiens
- Syritta flaviventris

===== Genus Temnostoma =====
10 species

- Temnostoma alternans
- Temnostoma apiforme
- Temnostoma barberi
- Temnostoma balyras
- Temnostoma dachous
- Temnostoma excentrica
- Temnostoma obscurum
- Temnostoma trifasciatum
- Temnostoma venustum

===== Genus Teuchocnemis =====
- Teuchocnemis bacuntius

===== Genus Tropidia =====
8 species

- Tropidia albistylum Macquart, 1847
- Tropidia calcarata Williston, 1887
- Tropidia coloradensis (Bigot, 1884)
- Tropidia incana Townsend, 1895
- Tropidia mamillata Loew, 1861
- Tropidia montana Hunter, 1896
- Tropidia pygmaea Shannon, 1926
- Tropidia quadrata (Say, 1824)

===== Genus Xylota =====
29 species

- Xylota analis Williston, 1887
- Xylota angustiventris Loew, 1866
- Xylota annulifera Bigot, 1884
- Xylota argoi Shannon, 1926
- Xylota barbata Loew, 1864
- Xylota bicolor Loew, 1864
- Xylota confusa Shannon, 1926
- Xylota ejuncida Say, 1824
- Xylota flavifrons Walker, 1849
- Xylota flavitibia Bigot, 1884
- Xylota flukei (Curran, 1941)
- Xylota hinei (Curran, 1941)
- Xylota lovetti Curran, 1925
- Xylota naknek Shannon, 1926
- Xylota nebulosa Johnson, 1921
- Xylota ouelleti (Curran, 1941)
- Xylota quadrimaculata Loew, 1866
- Xylota scutellarmata Lovett, 1919
- Xylota segnis (Linnaeus, 1758)
- Xylota subfasciata Loew, 1866
- Xylota tuberculata (Curran, 1941)

==== Tribe Rhingiini ====
===== Genus Cheilosia =====
78 species

- C. aerea (Dufour, 1848)
- C. alaskensis (Hunter, 1897)
- C. albitarsis (Meigen, 1822)
- Chilosia Agassiz, 1846
- C. aldrichi (Hunter, 1896)
- C. atrocapilla Hull and Fluke, 1950
- C. bardus (Harris, 1780)
- C. baroni (Williston, 1887)
- C. bicolorata (Shannon, 1922)
- C. bigelowi (Curran, 1926)
- C. borealis (Coquillett, 1900)
- C. browni Curran, 1931
- C. burkei (Shannon, 1922)
- C. caltha (Shannon, 1922)
- C. capillata (Loew, 1863)
- C. catalina (Shannon, 1922)
- C. chalybescens (Williston, 1893)
- C. chintimini (Lovett, 1921)
- C. columbiae (Curran, 1922)
- C. comosa (Loew, 1863)
- C. consentiens (Curran, 1926)
- C. coerulea Fluke and Hull, 1946
- C. cottrelli Telford, 1939
- C. cratorhina Hull and Fluke, 1950
- C. cynoprosopa Hull and Fluke, 1950
- C. ferruginea (Lovett, 1919)
- C. florella (Shannon, 1922)
- C. grossa (Fallén, 1817)
- C. hermiona Hull and Fluke, 1950
- C. hesperia (Shannon, 1922)
- C. hiantha Hull and Fluke, 1950
- C. hoodiana (Bigot, 1883)
- C. hunteri (Curran, 1922)
- C. julietta (Shannon, 1922)
- C. laevis (Bigot, 1884)
- C. lasiophthalmus Williston, 1882
- C. latrans (Walker, 1849)
- C. leucoparea (Loew, 1863)
- C. livida (Wehr, 1922)
- C. lucta (Snow, 1895)
- C. luna Hull and Fluke, 1950
- C. margarita Hull and Fluke, 1950
- C. meganosa Hull and Fluke, 1950
- C. montanipes Hull and Fluke, 1950
- C. nannomorpha Hull and Fluke, 1950
- C. nigrescens Hull and Fluke, 1950
- C. nigrobarba Hull and Fluke, 1950
- C. nigrovittata (Lovett, 1919)
- C. obesa Hull and Fluke, 1950
- C. occidentalis Williston, 1882
- C. orilliaensis Curran, 1922
- C. pacifica Hunter, 1897
- C. pagana (Meigen, 1822)
- C. pallipes Loew, 1863
- C. pikei Shannon, 1922
- C. pilosipes Hull and Fluke, 1950
- C. pontiaca (Shannon, 1922)
- C. porcina Hull and Fluke, 1950
- C. punctulata (Hunter, 1897)
- C. prima (Hunter, 1896)
- C. primoveris (Shannon, 1915)
- C. promethea Hull and Fluke, 1950
- C. rhinoprosopa Hull and Fluke, 1950
- C. rita (Curran, 1922)
- C. robusta (Hine, 1922)
- C. scilla Hull and Fluke, 1950
- C. sensua (Curran, 1922)
- C. seripila Hull and Fluke, 1950
- C. shannoni (Curran, 1923)
- C. sororcula (Williston, 1891)
- C. speculum Hull and Fluke, 1950
- C. swannanoa Brimley, 1925
- C. tantalus Hull and Fluke, 1950
- C. wisconsinensis Fluke and Hull, 1947
- C. yukonensis (Shannon, 1922)

===== Genus Ferdinandea =====
- Ferdinandea aeneicolor Shannon, 1924
- Ferdinandea buccata (Loew, 1863)
- Ferdinandea croesus (Osten Sacken, 1877)

===== Genus Rhingia =====
- Rhingia nasica

===== Genus Hiatomyia =====
- Hiatomyia canadensis (Shannon, 1922)
- Hiatomyia chionthrix Hull & fluke 1950
- Hiatomyia chrysothrix (Hull & Fluke, 1950)
- Hiatomyia coriacea (Hull & Fluke, 1950)
- Hiatomyia cyanea (Hunter, 1896)
- Hiatomyia cyanescens (Loew, 1863)
- Hiatomyia cyascens (Loew, 1863)
- Hiatomyia gemini (Shannon, 1922)
- Hiatomyia hecate (Hull & Fluke, 1950)
- Hiatomyia hyacintha (Hull & Fluke, 1950)
- Hiatomyia idahoa (Shannon, 1922)
- Hiatomyia nigrocyanea (Hull & Fluke, 1950)
- Hiatomyia niveifrons (Hull & Fluke, 1950)
- Hiatomyia nyctichroma (Hull & Fluke, 1950)
- Hiatomyia olivia (Hull & Fluke, 1950)
- Hiatomyia plumosa (Coquillett, 1904)
- Hiatomyia plutonia (Hunter, 1897)
- Hiatomyia rubroflava (Hull & Fluke, 1950)
- Hiatomyia signatiseta (Hunter, 1896)
- Hiatomyia tessa (Hull & Fluke, 1950)
- Hiatomyia townsendi (Hunter, 1896)
- Hiatomyia willistoni (Snow, 1895)

==== Tribe Volucellini ====
===== Genus Copestylum =====
82 species

- C. abdominale (Wiedemann, 1930)
- C. alberlena Marcos-Garcia & Perez-Banon, 2002
- C. amethystinum (Bigot, 1875)
- C. anna (Williston, 1887) (Anna's bromeliad fly)
- C. apiciferum (Townsend, 1895)
- C. barbara Hancock & Marcos-Garcia, 2007
- C. avidum (Osten Sacken, 1877) (yellow-spotted bromeliad fly)
- C. barbara Hancock & Marcos-Garcia, 2007
- C. barei (Curran, 1925) (violet bromeliad fly)
- C. boqueronense Rotheray & Marcos-Garcia, 2007
- C. brunneum (Thunberg, 1789)
- C. caesariatum (Williston, 1891)
- C. caudatum Curran, 1927 (hairy-horned bromeliad fly)
- C. chalybescens (Wiedemann, 1830)
- C. comstocki (Williston, 1887) (Comstock's bromeliad fly)
- C. conabioi Marcos-Garcia & Rotheray, 2007
- C. elizabethae Hancock & Rotheray, 2007
- C. emeralda (Hull, 1944)
- C. eugenia (Williston, 1887)
- C. florida (Hull, 1941) (Florida bromeliad fly)
- C. fornax (Townsend, 1895)
- C. fraudulentum (Williston, 1891)
- C. fulvicorne (Bigot, 1883)
- C. gelenitae Marcos-Garcia & Rotheray, 2007
- C. gibberum (Schiner, 1868)
- C. haagii (Jaennicke, 1867) (Haag's bromeliad fly)
- C. hispaniolae Thompson, 1981
- C. isabellina (Williston, 1887) (Isabelle's bromeliad fly)
- C. joei Rotheray & Hancock, 2007
- C. lentum Williston, 1887
- C. limbipenne Williston, 1887
- C. macrocephalum (Giglio-tos, 1892)
- C. macquarti (Curran, 1926)
- C. mamorum Rotheray & Marcos-Garcia, 2007
- C. marginatum (Say, 1829)
- C. megacephalum (Loew, 1863)
- C. mexicanum (Macquart, 1842) (Mexican cactus fly)
- C. melleum (Jannicke, 1867)
- C. opalescens (Townsend, 1901)
- C. opinator (Williston, 1891)
- C. ornatum (Williston, 1891)
- C. oscillans Hancock & Rotheray, 2007
- C. pallens (Wiedemann, 1830)
- C. pictum (Wiedemann, 1830)
- C. posticum (Say, 1829)
- C. pubescens (Loew, 1861)
- C. punctigena (Hull, 1937)
- C. pusillum (Macquart, 1842)
- C. puyarum Rotheray & Hancock, 2007
- C. quadratum (Williston, 1891)
- C. rafaelanum (Townsend, 1897)
- C. satur (Osten Sacken, 1877) (spotted-wing bromeliad fly)
- C. sexmaculatum (Palisot de Beauvois, 1819) (six-spotted bromeliad fly)
- C. simile Giglio-Tos, 1892
- C. sternale (Curran, 1930)
- C. sultzi (Curran, 1939)
- C. tacanense Rotheray & Hancock, 2007
- C. tamaulipanum (Townsend, 1898)
- C. tapanti Rotheray & Hancock, 2007
- C. tapia Rotheray & Hancock, 2007
- C. tricinctum (Bigot, 1875)
- C. triunfense Hancock, 2007
- C. trivittatum Thompson, 1988
- C. tympanitis (Fabricius, 1805)
- C. umamas Hancock & Rotheray, 2007
- C. vagum (Wiedemann, 1830)
- C. varians (Bigot, 1875)
- C. vera (Hull, 1942)
- C. violaceum (Say, 1829) (purple bromeliad fly)
- C. virescens (Williston, 1891)
- C. vittatum Thompson, 1976 (striped bromeliad fly)
- Copestylum versicularium
- C. victoria (Williston, 1887) (Victoria's bromeliad fly)
- C. violaceum (Say, 1829) (purple bromeliad fly)
- C. vittatum Thompson, 1976 (striped bromeliad fly)
- C. xalapensis Rotheray & Marcos-Garcia, 2007
- C. yowoi Rotheray & Hancock, 2007
- C. yura (Curran, 1930)

===== Genus Ornidia =====
- Ornidia obesa

===== Genus Volucella =====
- Volucella bombylans
