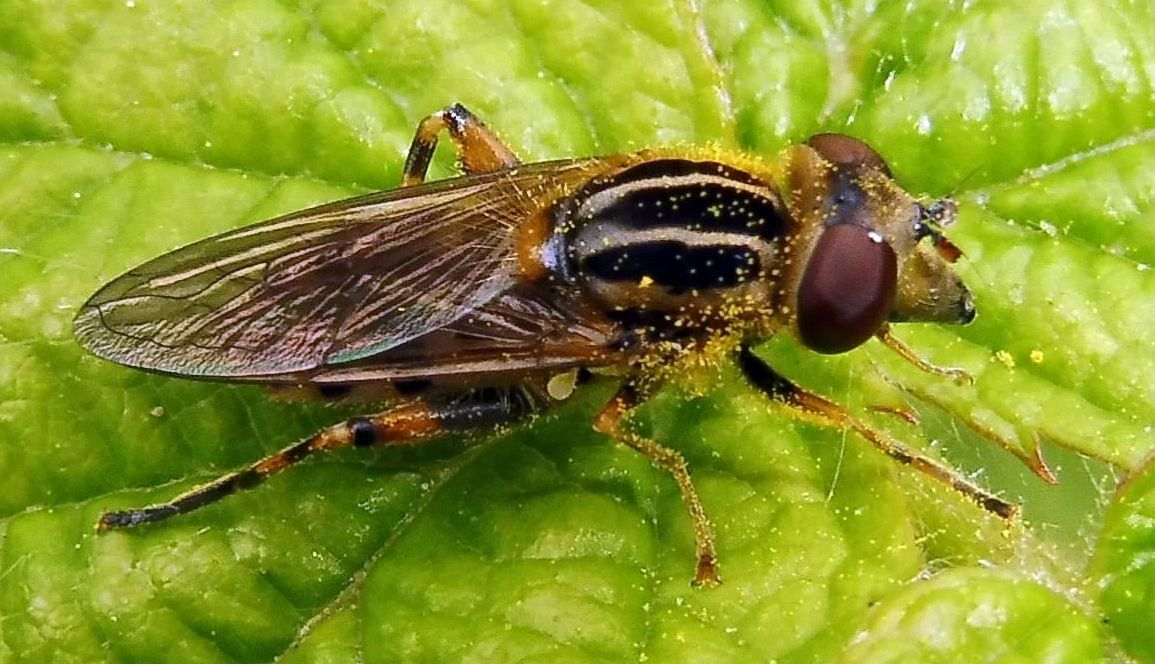

Scientific classification
- Domain: Eukaryota
- Kingdom: Animalia
- Phylum: Arthropoda
- Class: Insecta
- Order: Diptera
- Family: Syrphidae
- Genus: Lejops
- Species: L. lineatus

Binomial name
- Lejops lineatus (Fabricius, 1787)

Synonyms
- Helophilus conostomus Williston, 1887; Helophilus stipatus Walker, 1849; Rhingia lineatus Fabricius, 1787

= Lejops lineatus =

Species of fly

Lejops lineatus is a species of syrphid fly in the family Syrphidae.
