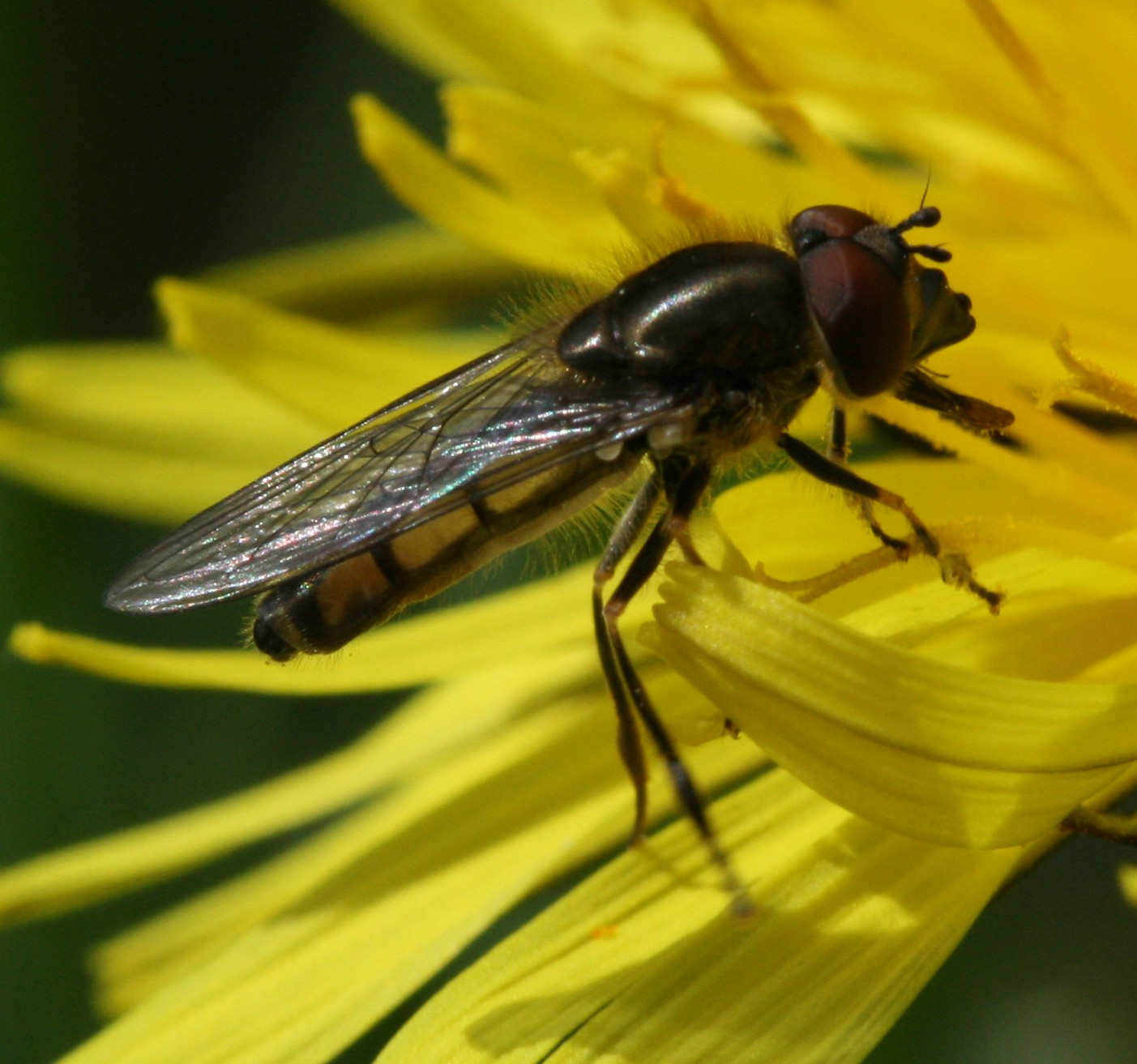
- Male
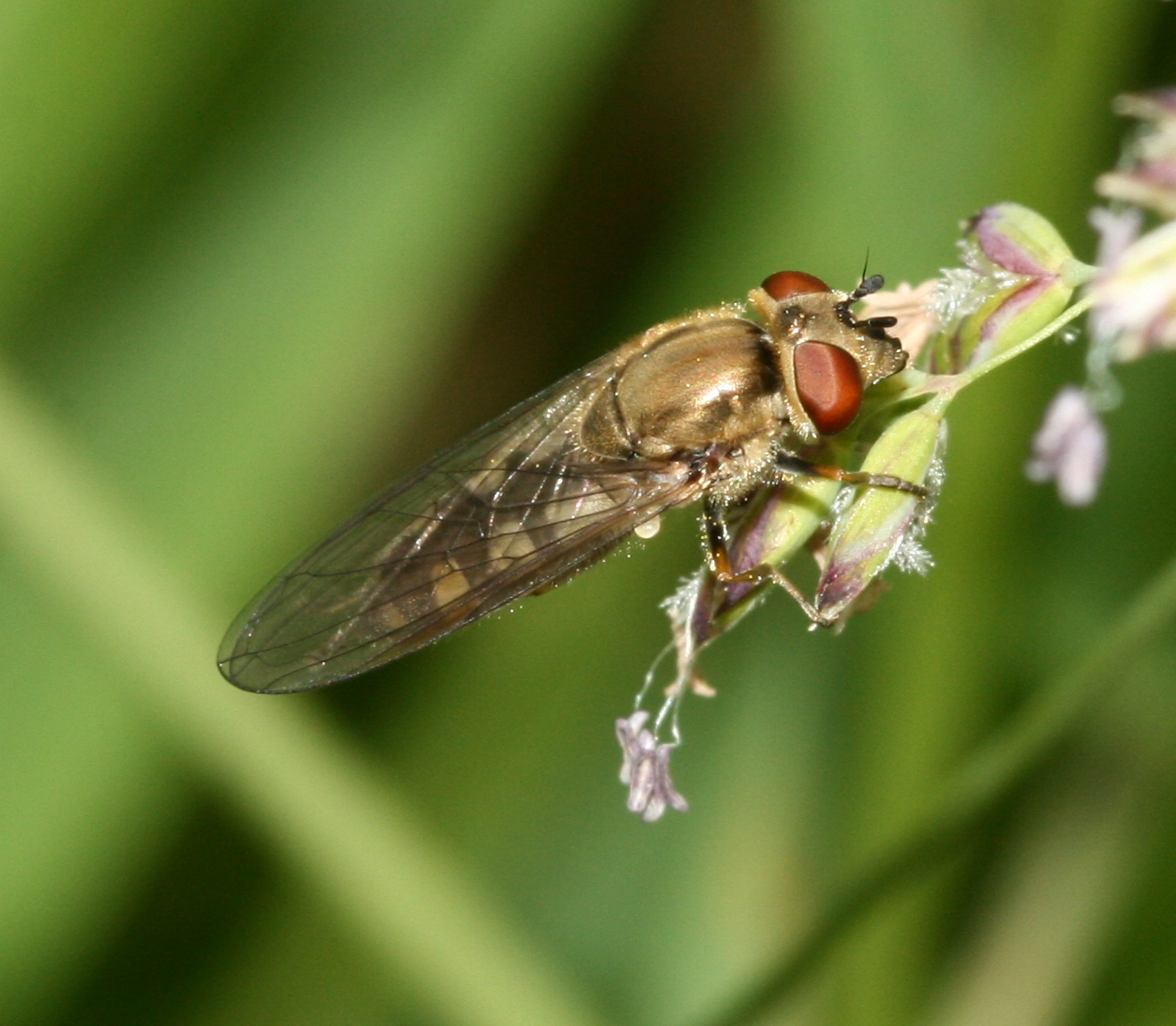
- Female

Scientific classification
- Kingdom: Animalia
- Phylum: Arthropoda
- Clade: Pancrustacea
- Class: Insecta
- Order: Diptera
- Family: Syrphidae
- Genus: Platycheirus
- Subgenus: Platycheirus
- Species: P. manicatus

Binomial name
- Platycheirus manicatus (Meigen, 1822)

Synonyms
- Platycheirus ciliger Loew, 1856; Syrphus manicatus Meigen, 1822

= Platycheirus manicatus =

Species of fly

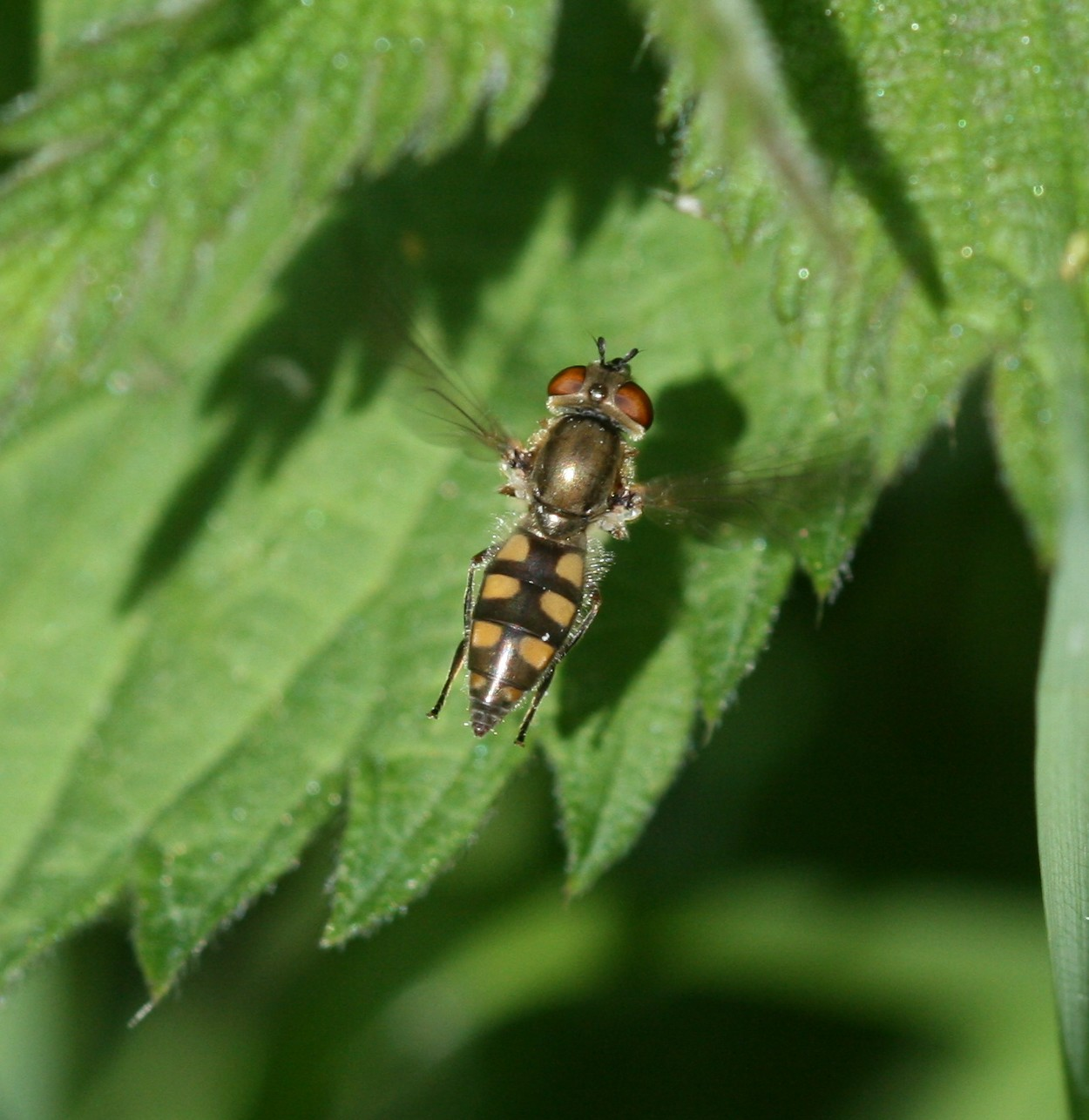
Platycheirus manicatus, female hovering

Platycheirus manicatus is a species of hoverfly. It is found across the Palearctic and in Alaska.

== Description of males ==
External images and distribution map

For terminology see

- Spheight's Key to Genera of European Syrphidae with Morphological terms.
- Glossary of morphological terminology of adult Syrphidae, Steenis
- Picture key to Nearctic syrphid genera, Miranda et al.

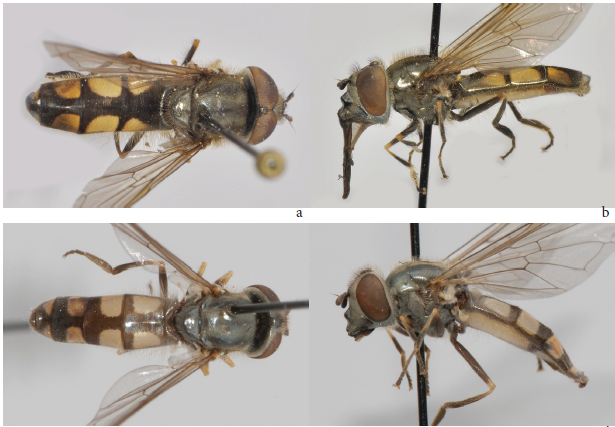
Platycheirus manicatus male above Figure 1, Andrew Young

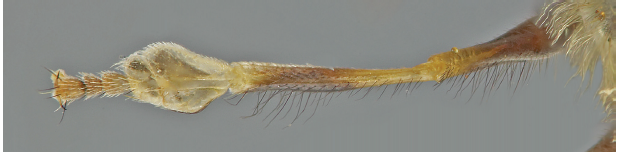
Platycheirus manicatus male fore leg Figure 2, Andrew Young

Length
7.9–10.1 mm (0.31–0.40 in)

The face is strongly protruding downward, with the anterior oral margin extending well beyond the tubercle. The face is powdery yellow except for the shining black tubercle. (see Figure 1 and general anatomy) The legs are dark, but with short tip of femora and connection of the tibiae pale. The first two tarsomeres of the foreleg are very pale. The first front tarsomere (T1, see general anatomy) is nearly triangular, about 2.5 times as wide as the tip of the tibia, and slightly longer than wide. The second front tarsomere (T2) is nearly rectangular, three-quarters as wide as the first tarsomere, and one-quarter as long. The remaining fore tarsomeres are unmodified. The fore tibia has several fine, wavy setae (hairs) on the outer half of the bottom surface, with the longest setae being approximately three times the tibial width. The middle tibia has sparse, wavy, posterodorsal, and posterior pile (hairs) on the outer half, with the longest pile being about four times as long as the tibial diameter.(Figure 2) The first tarsomere (T1) of the hind leg is strongly swollen. The rest of the legs are unchanged. The entire thorax is strongly yellow or grey powdery, with dense thoracic pile, half pale and half dark. The halter is yellow, and the wing is completely microtrichose (microscopic hairs). The abdomen is narrowly oval, with spots of tergites 2-4 being yellow, longer than wide, and separated from the anterior and lateral margins of the tergites. The female has small yellow spots on tergite 5 ( see figure 1 bottom)

General Anatomy click to enlarge

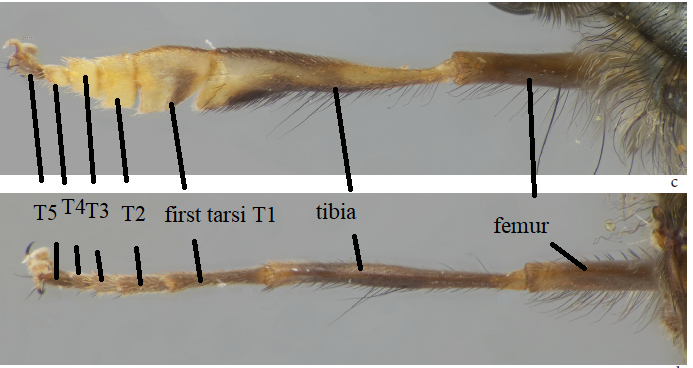
Legs

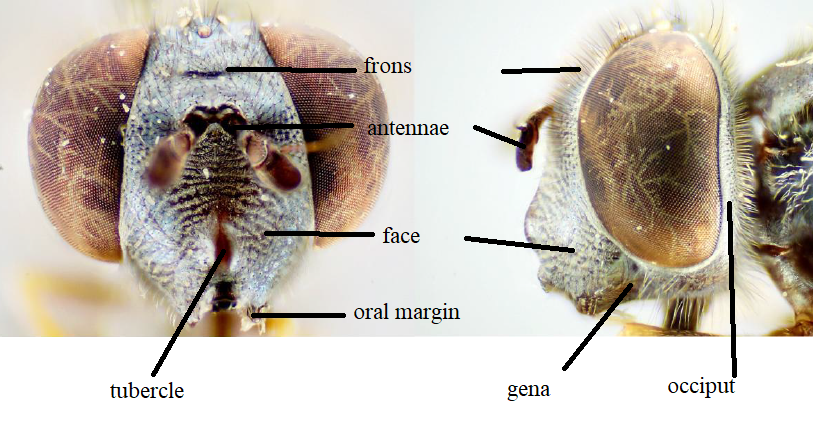
Head

Wing

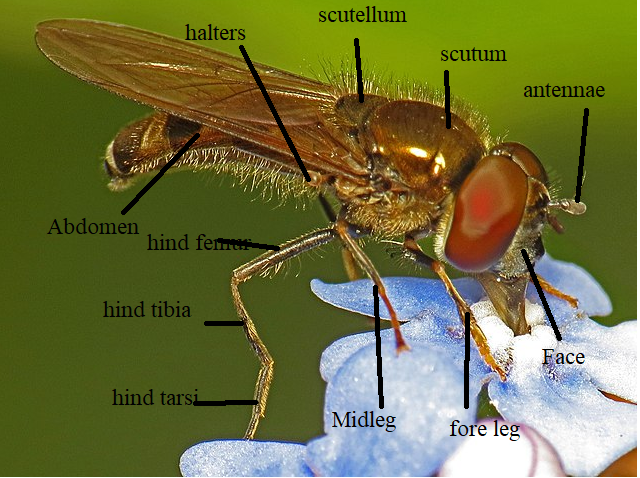
Body

== Distribution ==
Palearctic: Fennoscandia south to Iberia, the Mediterranean basin, Ireland eastwards through Europe into Turkey and Russia then Siberia and the Altai. Nearctic: Alaska and Greenland.

== Biology ==
Habitat: fen, humid, grassland (to above 2,000 metres or 6,600 feet in the Alps), moorland and taiga. It flies May to September.
