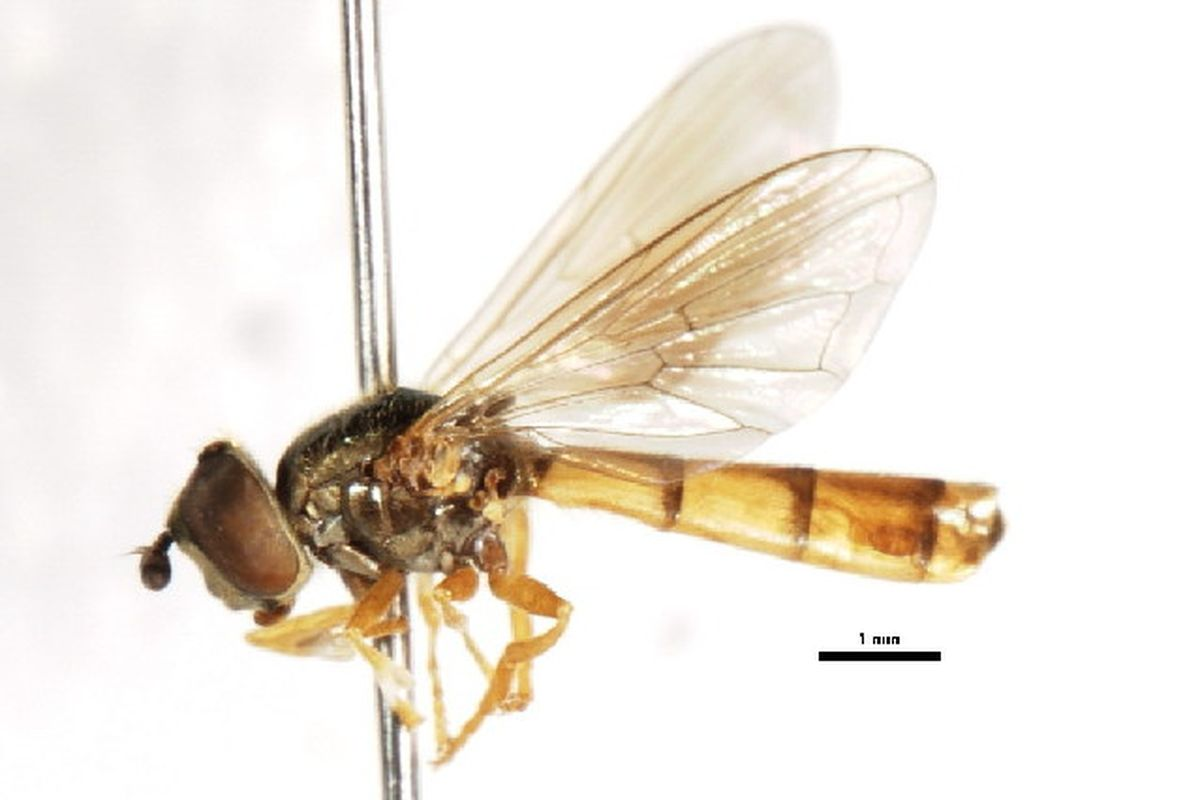

Scientific classification
- Kingdom: Animalia
- Phylum: Arthropoda
- Clade: Pancrustacea
- Class: Insecta
- Order: Diptera
- Family: Syrphidae
- Genus: Platycheirus
- Subgenus: Platycheirus
- Species: P. normae

Binomial name
- Platycheirus normae Fluke, 1939

= Platycheirus normae =

Species of insect

Platycheirus normae, the paddlearm sedgesitter, is a rare species of syrphid fly observed in northeastern North America. Hoverflies can remain nearly motionless in flight. The adults are also known as flower flies for they are commonly found on flowers, from which they get both energy-giving nectar and protein-rich pollen. Larvae are aphid predators.
