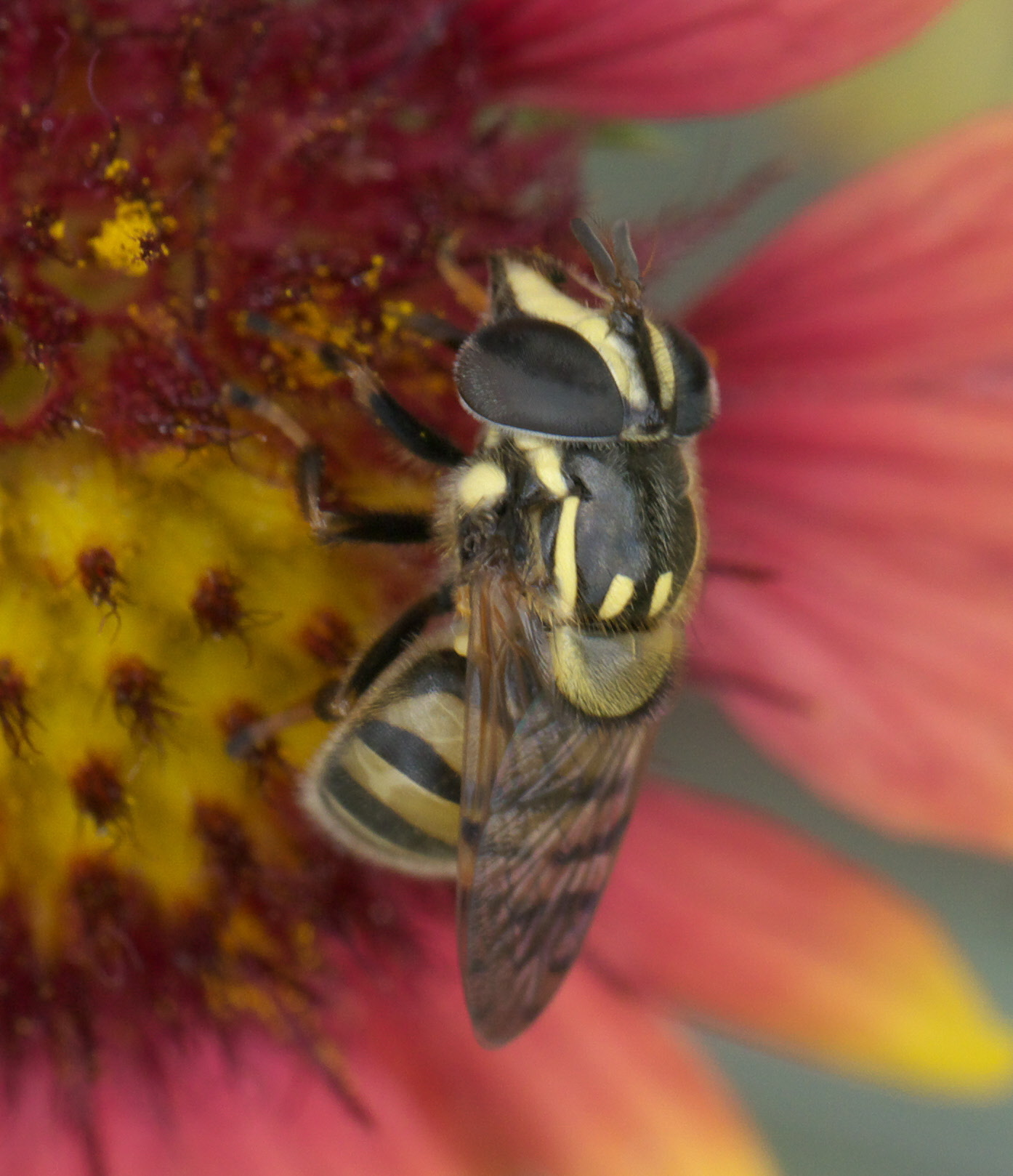

Scientific classification
- Kingdom: Animalia
- Phylum: Arthropoda
- Class: Insecta
- Order: Diptera
- Family: Syrphidae
- Genus: Copestylum
- Species: C. vittatum

Binomial name
- Copestylum vittatum Thompson, 1976

Synonyms
- Volucella americana Goot, 1964; Volucella fasciata Macquart, 1842

= Copestylum vittatum =

Species of fly

Copestylum vittatum, the striped bromeliad fly, is a species of syrphid fly in the family Syrphidae. It is widely distributed in North America.
