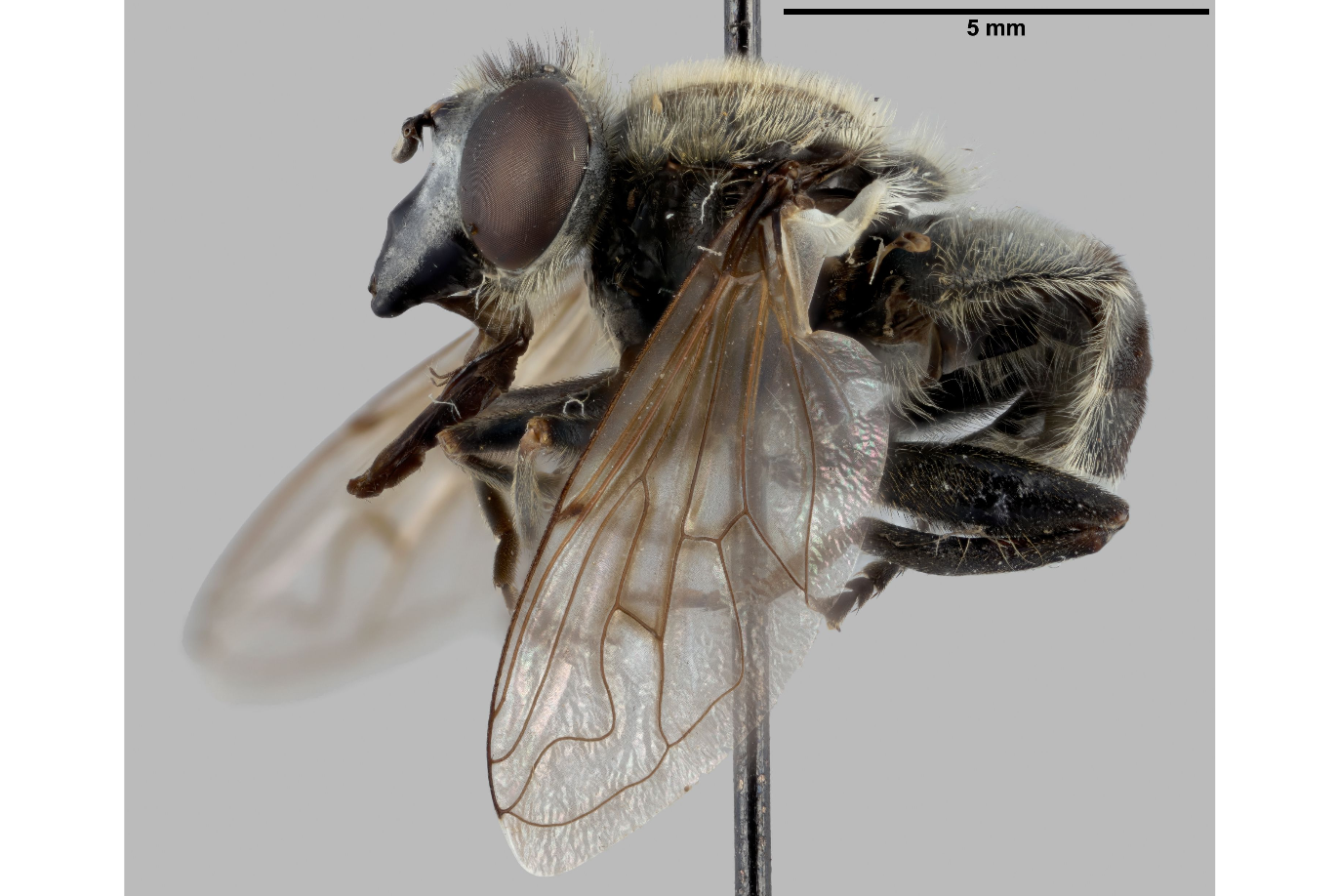
- A. willingii female
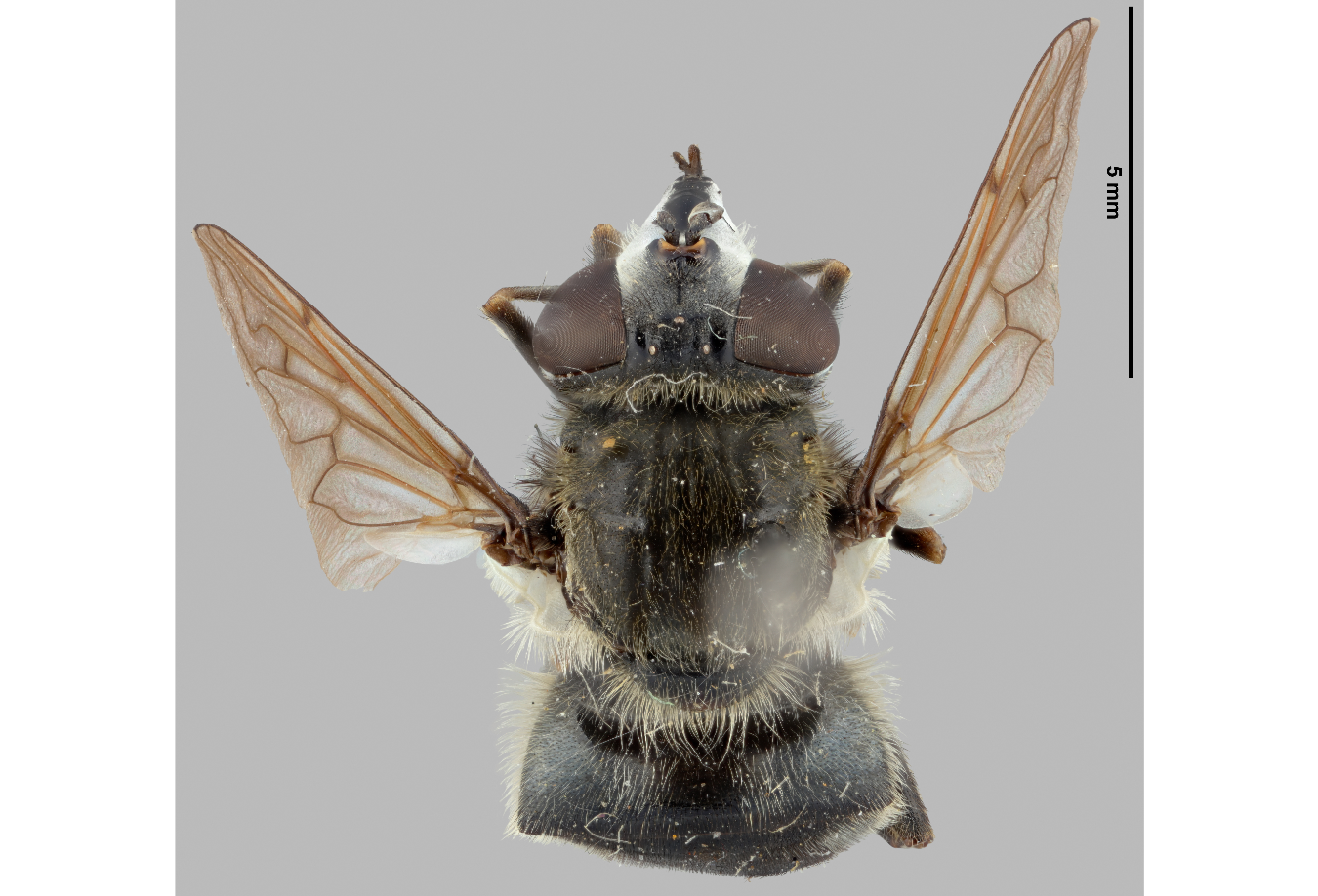

Scientific classification
- Kingdom: Animalia
- Phylum: Arthropoda
- Class: Insecta
- Order: Diptera
- Family: Syrphidae
- Tribe: Eristalini
- Subtribe: Helophilina
- Genus: Arctosyrphus
- Species: A. willingii

Binomial name
- Arctosyrphus willingii (Smith, 1912)

Synonyms
- Lejops willingii (Smith, 1912); Asemosyrphus canadensis Curran, 1922; Helophilus willingii Smith, 1912

= Arctosyrphus willingii =

Species of fly

Arctosyrphus willingii, the northern longbeak, is a species of rat-tail maggot fly in the family Syrphidae. This species was formerly a member of the genus Lejops.

== Description ==
For terminology seeSpeight key to genera and glossary

Size

Length 11–12 mm (0.43–0.47 in)

Head

In males, the frons is about one-half as wide as the eyes, while in females it is nearly as wide. In males, the pile on the upper half of the frons is black, while on the lower half it is grayish white. In females, there is black pile on the frons that extends a little below the upper half. The vertex is shining black and very thinly dusted gray pollinose and the ocelli are very widely separated. The posterior orbits have whitish pile below and yellowish pile above. The face on the lower half is produced obtusely downward and forward into a cone. The face is shining black, densely grayish-white pollinose on the sides, and bearing pile of a similar color along the margins of the eyes. The face beneath the antennae is concave for a short distance and then nearly straight to the tip. There is a moderately broad shining black stripe in the middle of the face extending from the tip of the epistoma nearly to the base of the antennas. The ventral side of the epistoma is shining black. The gena below the eyes are narrow, dull black, and grayish pilose. The antennal prominence is narrowly reddish above the antennae. The first two joints of the antennae are shining black, while the third joint is brownish black and oval with white dusted gray pollen. The arista is brown, bare, long, and slender, tapering.

Thorax

The scutum is shining black, with the lateral stripes being rather indistinct and gray. In the female, there are two velvety black spots at the tip of each mesothoracic suture. The pile of the mesonotum is grayish and the scutellum is shining black and gray pilose. The pleurae are also shining black and densely grayish pilose.

Abdomen

The abdomen is oval and shorter than the wings, with a wholly shining black surface. The pile of the abdomen is pale yellowish, but across the disc on the posterior half of each segment there is shorter black pile.

Wings

The wings of the male are subhyaline, while those of the female are slightly smoky brown. The veins and stigma are brownish, and the calypteres are whitish with white pile. The halteres are brownish yellow, and the vein R4+5 loops into cell R4+5.

Legs

The legs are shining black, with the tip of the femora and the base of the tibiae faintly brownish. The pile is mostly grayish and black in reflections, and the tarsi are ochraceous in some reflections. The hind femora are considerably enlarged, with the greatest swelling near the middle. The hind tibiae are arcuate, not ending in a spur. All the tarsi are golden pubescent beneath.

== Distribution ==
Canada: Yukon, Alberta, Manitoba, Saskatchewan. United States: Alaska, Minnesota, North Dakota.
