= Chrysosyrphus frontosus =

Scientific classification
- Kingdom: Animalia
- Phylum: Arthropoda
- Class: Insecta
- Order: Diptera
- Family: Syrphidae
- Genus: Chrysosyrphus
- Species: C. frontosus

Binomial name
- Chrysosyrphus frontosus (Bigot, 1884)

Synonyms
- Cartosyrphus frontosus Bigot, 1884; Chilosia versipellis Williston, 1887; Chrysogaster bigelowi Curran, 1926; Chrysogaster ithaca Shannon, 1925

Species of fly

Chrysosyrphus frontosus is a species of syrphid fly in the family Syrphidae.
