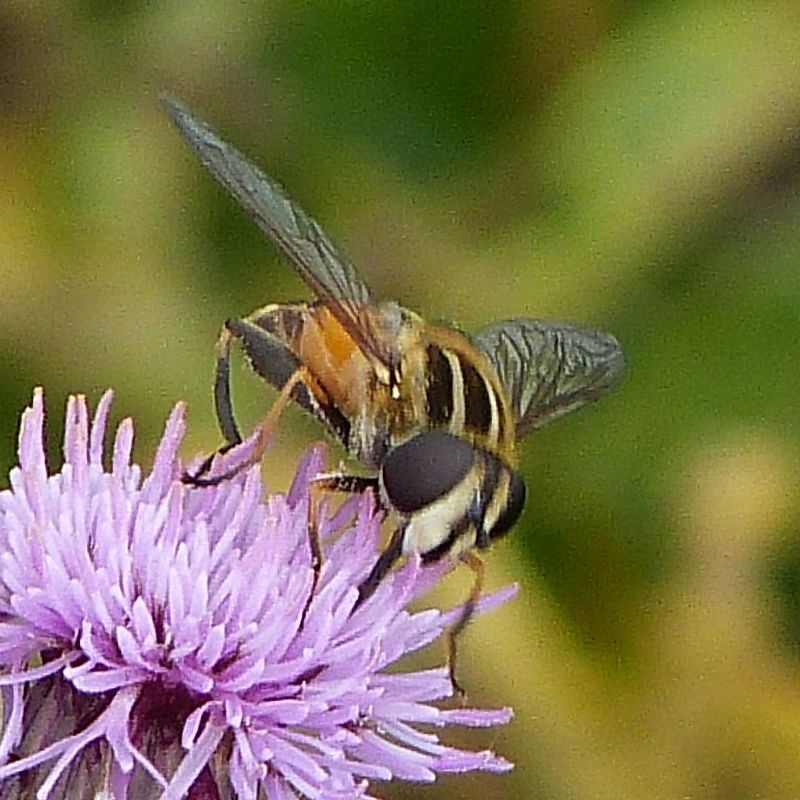

Scientific classification
- Kingdom: Animalia
- Phylum: Arthropoda
- Clade: Pancrustacea
- Class: Insecta
- Order: Diptera
- Family: Syrphidae
- Genus: Helophilus
- Species: H. hybridus

Binomial name
- Helophilus hybridus Loew, 1846

= Helophilus hybridus =

Species of fly

H. hybridus feeding

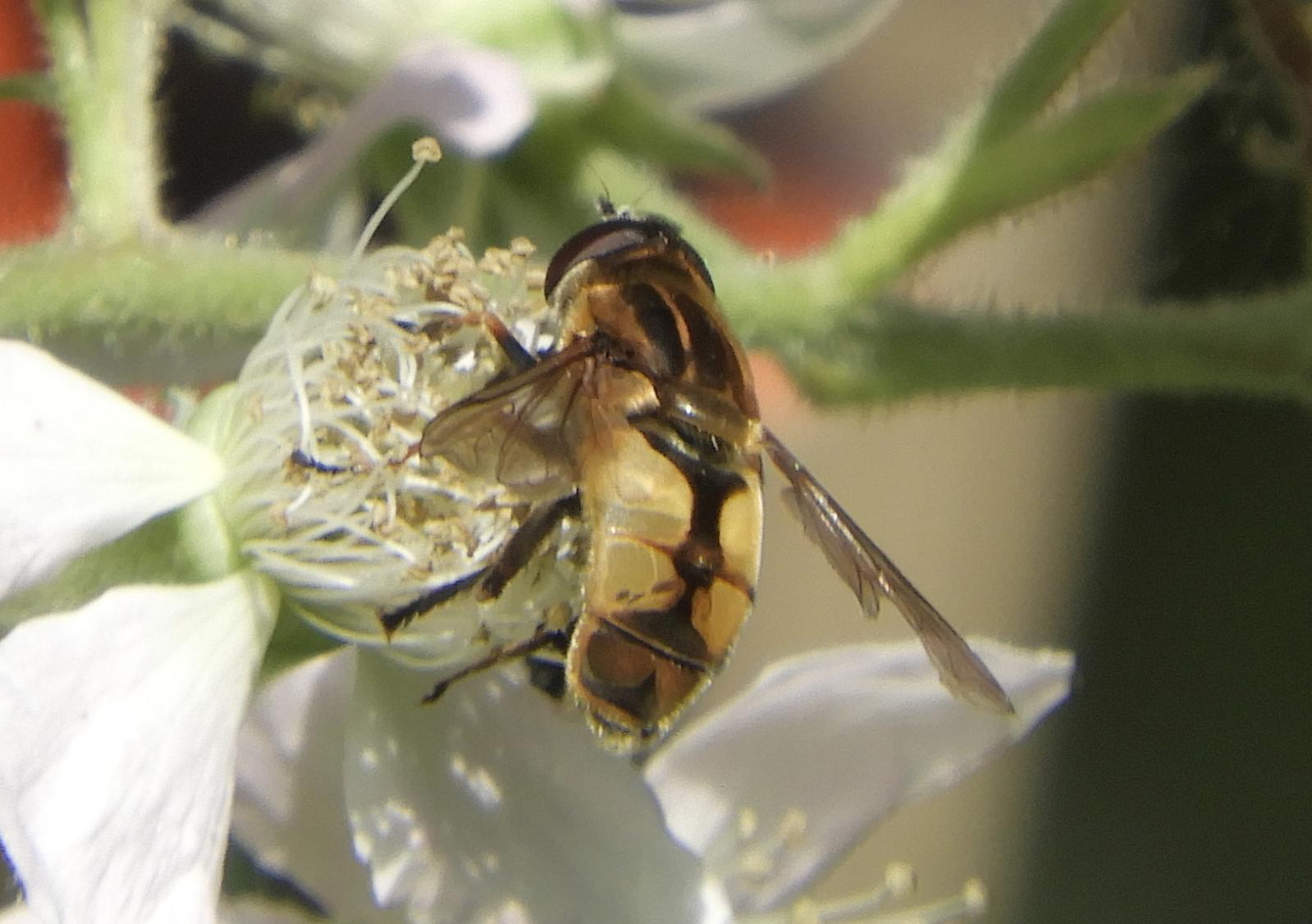
Helophilus hybridus Hoverfly showing abdomen

Helophilus hybridus is a hoverfly. It is a Palearctic species.

== Description ==
For terms see Morphology of Diptera

Wing length 8·5-11·25 mm. Femorae 3 top 1/4 or less yellow. Tibiae 3 pale on basal 1/4 or less. Males tergite 2 large yellow spotsreach the hind margin over their full width. The larva is illustrated by Hartley (1961). See references for determination

== Distribution ==
Palearctic Fennoscandia South to North France. Ireland East through North Europe and Central Europe (including the Alps) East into Russia and on through the Russian Far East and Siberia to the Pacific coast. Mongolia. Nearctic from Alaska to Nova Scotia and South to Utah.

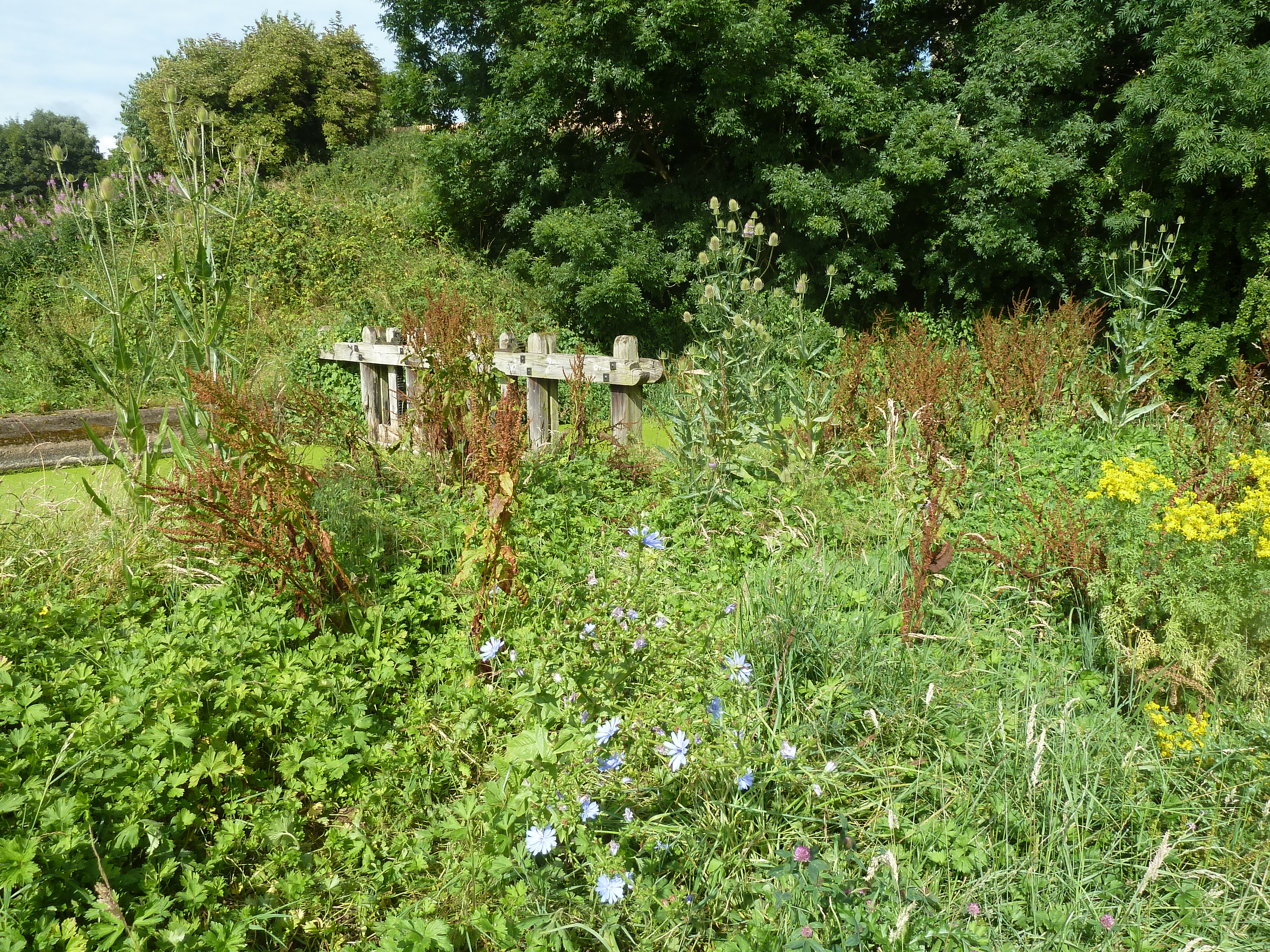
Habitat.Ireland

== Biology ==
Habitat: wetlands non-eutrophic pools in fen, poor fen, deciduous woodland and dune slacks, cutover valley bog, fen carr, taiga. Flowers visited include white umbellifers, Calluna vulgaris, Cirsium, Convolvulus, Crataegus, Echium, Euphorbia, Limonium, Lycopus, Mentha aquatica, Menyanthes, Narthecium, Parnassia palustris, Plantago, Pulicaria, Rosa, Rubus, Salix repens, Salix, Senecio, Sorbus, Succisa, Taraxacum, Valeriana. The flight period is early May to early September.
