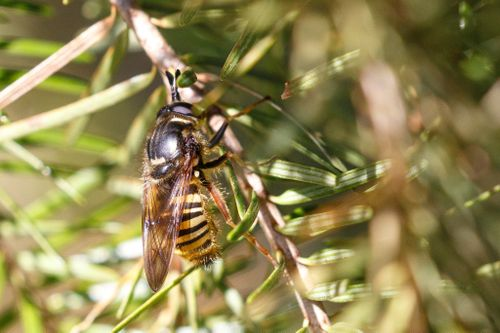

Scientific classification
- Kingdom: Animalia
- Phylum: Arthropoda
- Clade: Pancrustacea
- Class: Insecta
- Order: Diptera
- Family: Syrphidae
- Genus: Criorhina
- Species: C. occidentalis

Binomial name
- Criorhina occidentalis (Osburn, 1908)

Synonyms
- Sphecomyia occidentalis Osburn, 1908

= Criorhina occidentalis =

Species of fly

Criorhina occidentalis is a species of hoverfly in the family Syrphidae.

== Distribution ==
Canada, United States.
