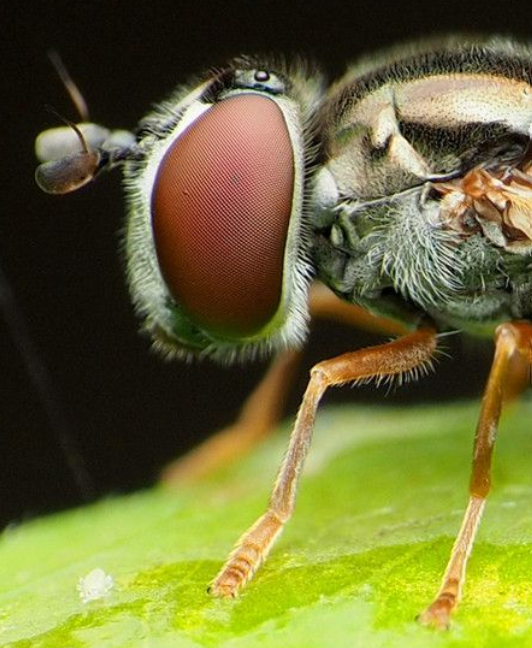
- Female head by Katja Schulz

Scientific classification
- Kingdom: Animalia
- Phylum: Arthropoda
- Clade: Pancrustacea
- Class: Insecta
- Order: Diptera
- Family: Syrphidae
- Genus: Platycheirus
- Subgenus: Platycheirus
- Species: P. hyperboreus

Binomial name
- Platycheirus hyperboreus (Staeger, 1845)

Synonyms
- Platycheirus chirosphena Hull, 1944; Platycheirus erraticus Curran, 1927; Syrphus hyperboreus Staeger, 1845

= Platycheirus hyperboreus =

Species of fly

Platycheirus hyperboreus, the pearly sedgesitter, is a species of syrphid fly in the family Syrphidae. In North America hyperboreus is broadly distributed across Alaska, Canada, Greenland and the northern United States, ranging as far south as North Carolina in the east and Nevada. In western and northern Europe ranging from Norway, Finland, northern Russia (Kola peninsula) and on into northern Siberia.

== Description ==
For terminology see Speight key to genera and glossary or Glossary of morphological terminology

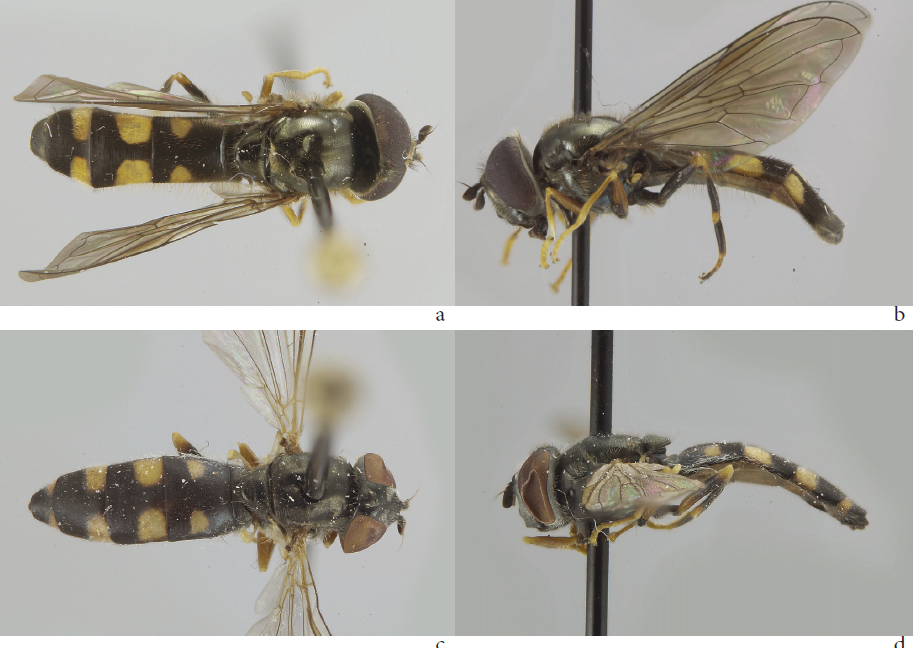
Platycheirus hyperboreus male above from Andrew Young

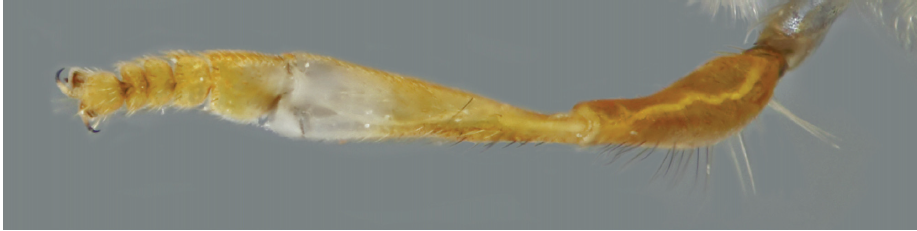
Platycheirus hyperboreus male front leg from Andrew Young

Length
5.3–8.7 mm (0.21–0.34 in)
Head
Face rather thickly covered with yellowish gray pollen, leaving only the tubercle and the cheeks in front more shining. Face somewhat receding in profile, the tubercle inconspicuous; cheeks convex below, Antennae brownish black. Frontal triangle pollinose, with black pile.:;Abdomen: opaque black; the first and fifth segments and the hypopygium shining green ish black; second segment with a small rounded spot on each side; third segment with a large quadrate spot in front reaching to a little beyond the middle; fourth segment similar, the spots scarcely reaching beyond the middle; fifth segment shining, wholly without yellow.
Legs
Front legs yellow, the tibiae gradually and nearly evenly dilated from the base to the tip, tarsi moderately dilated, thence gradually narrowed to the tip. The middle legs yellow with blackish femora. Hind legs black with yellow joints and tarsi.

Wings
membrane entirely trichose or with small bare area at base of cells c and bm.

General Anatomy, click to enlarge

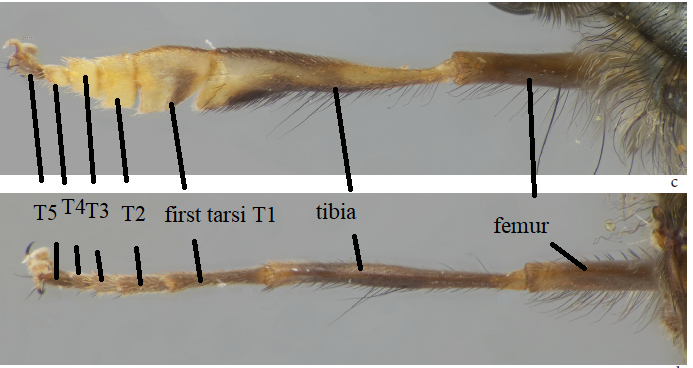
Legs

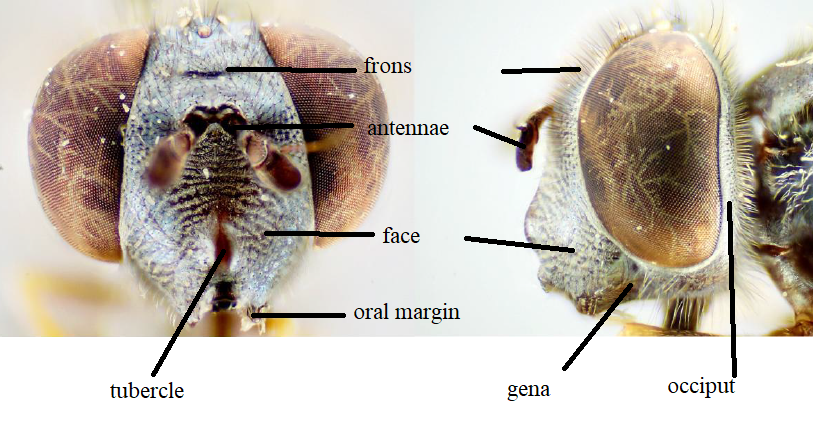
Head

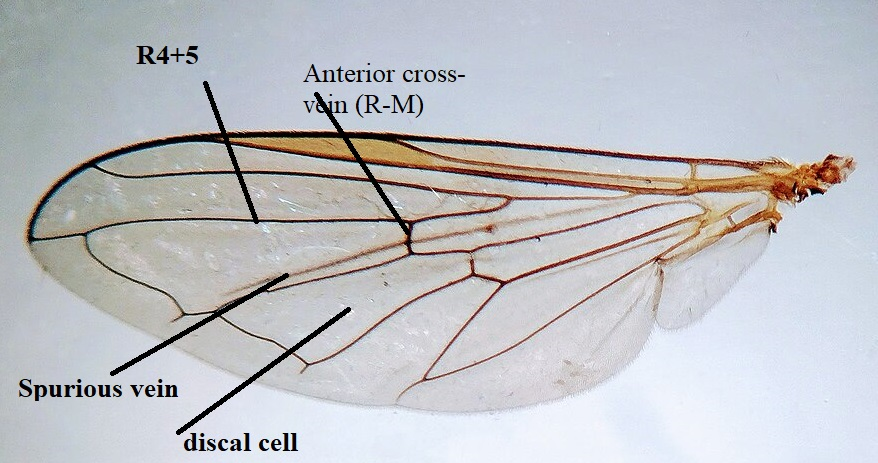
Wing

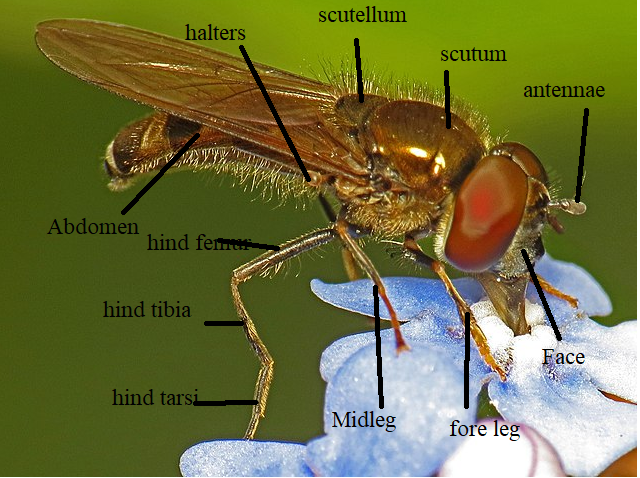
Body
