= Criorhina nigriventris =

Scientific classification
- Kingdom: Animalia
- Phylum: Arthropoda
- Clade: Pancrustacea
- Class: Insecta
- Order: Diptera
- Family: Syrphidae
- Subfamily: Eristalinae
- Tribe: Milesiini
- Subtribe: Criorhinina
- Genus: Criorhina
- Species: C. nigriventris

Binomial name
- Criorhina nigriventris Walton, 1911

Synonyms
- Criorhina aurata Curran, 1925; Criorhina intermedia Johnson, 1917; Criorhina maritima Curran, 1924; Criorhina mystaceae Curran, 1925; Criorhina verbosa var. aurata Curran, 1925; Milesia gnava Harris, 1835

Species of fly

Criorhina nigriventris , the bare-cheeked bumble fly, is an uncommon species of syrphid fly observed across the northern United States, the Appalachian Mountains and southern Canada. Hoverflies can remain nearly motionless in flight. The adults are also known as flower flies for they are commonly found on flowers, from which they get both energy-giving nectar and protein-rich pollen. The larvae of this genus are found in decaying wood.

== Distribution ==
Canada, United States.
