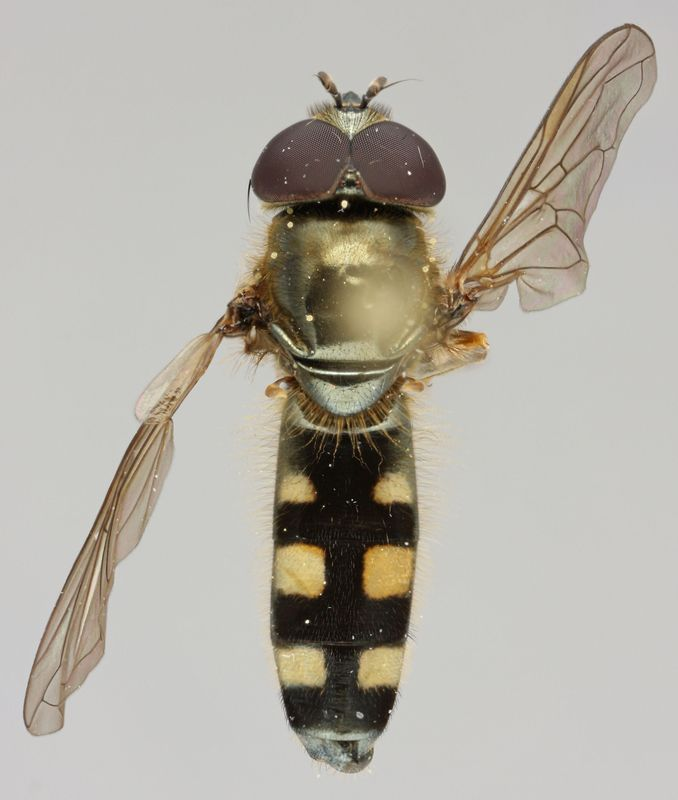

Scientific classification
- Kingdom: Animalia
- Phylum: Arthropoda
- Clade: Pancrustacea
- Class: Insecta
- Order: Diptera
- Family: Syrphidae
- Genus: Platycheirus
- Subgenus: Platycheirus
- Species: P. nielseni

Binomial name
- Platycheirus nielseni Vockeroth, 1990

= Platycheirus nielseni =

Species of fly

Platycheirus nielseni is a Holarctic species of hoverfly.

== Description ==
External images For terms see Morphology of Diptera
Tibiae 2 uniformly broadened from base towards apex then becoming smaller and then swelling strongly on apical 1/5.

== Distribution ==
It is found from the Palearctic in Fennoscandia, then south to northern France (Vosges) and Ireland, then eastwards through Northern Europe and Central Europe, northern Italy to European Russia; then by Siberia Nearctic Alaska it is found through Canada and goes south through the Rocky mountains to Colorado.
