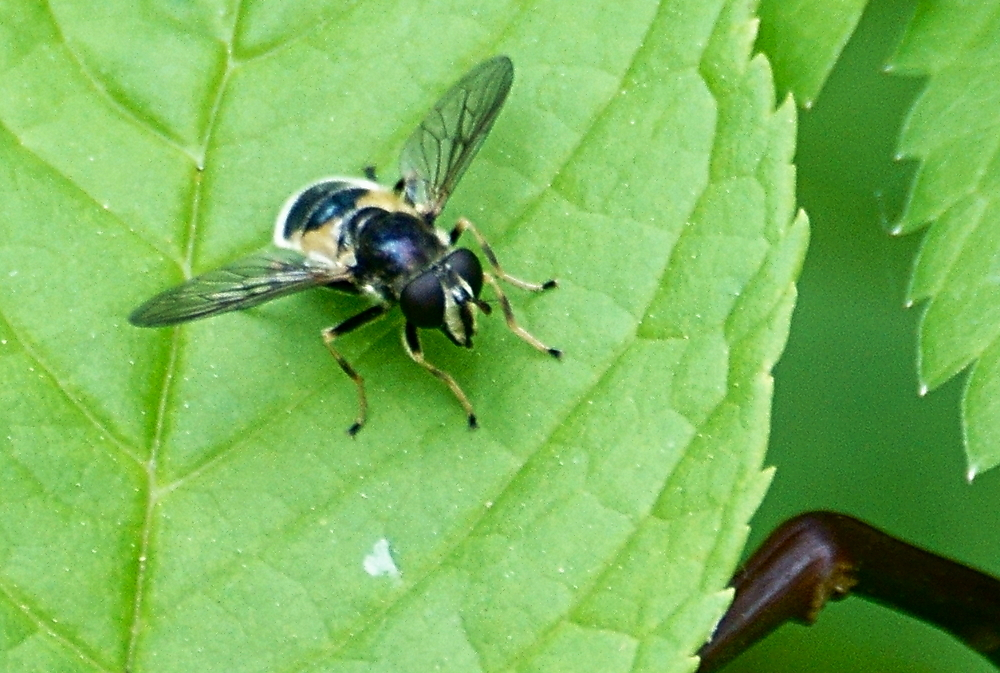

Scientific classification
- Kingdom: Animalia
- Phylum: Arthropoda
- Clade: Pancrustacea
- Class: Insecta
- Order: Diptera
- Family: Syrphidae
- Subfamily: Eristalinae
- Tribe: Milesiini
- Genus: Blera
- Species: B. confusa

Binomial name
- Blera confusa Johnson, 1913

= Blera confusa =

Species of fly

Blera confusa, the confusing wood fly, is a common species of syrphid fly first officially described by Johnson, 1913 Hoverflies get their names from the ability to remain nearly motionless while in flight. The adults are also known as flower flies for they are commonly found around and on flowers, from which they get both energy-giving nectar and protein-rich pollen. The larvae are of the rat-tailed type feeding on exuding sap or in the rot holes of trees.

== Distribution ==
This is a Nearctic species that is widely distributed in Eastern and Central North America.

== Description ==
For terms see Morphology of Diptera.

Length 10 mm

Head

The vertical triangle and, antennal process are black. The frons is black but covered with shining, slightly covered with a grayish pollen and whitish hairs. The face is yellow covered with yellowish pollen, There is a wide black facial stripe vitta beneath the antennal process. The gena are shining black. The scape and pedicel of the antennae are black and the flagellum and the arista are brown. The occiput is black beneath the thich grayish pollen and white pile.

Thorax

The thorax is greenish black, shining, with long dull yellowish pile. The humeri postpronotum are grayish pollinose.

Abdomen

The abdomen black with yellow spots anteriorly. The first segment is all black. The sides of the second segment have large yellow triangles continuous with the smaller yellow triangles on the third segment. The black area on the dorsum of the segment segment has an hourglass shape. The third segments has yellow triangles that are about half the size as those of the second segment. The fourth segment has small to inconspicuous yellow triangles at the anterior angles. The abdominal pile is yellowish except on the black areas of the second and third segments where it is black. In the female the yellow abdominal triangles on the third abdominal segment are much smaller.

Wings

The wings are brownish hyaline with brown veins. The vein (R_{4+5}) is almost straight and joins the costa (C)just before the tip of the wing. The first posterior cell (r_{4+5}) is acute apically and extends almost to the wing margin before the tip. The halteres (#9) are yellow.

Legs

The legs are black and yellow. The front mid and hind femora are black. The front and mid tibia are yellow with wide black rings on the lower half. The hind tibia is black. The front and mid tarsi have yellow with last two tarsomeres black. The hind tarsi are all black.

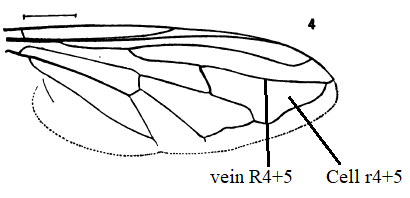
Blera wing veins

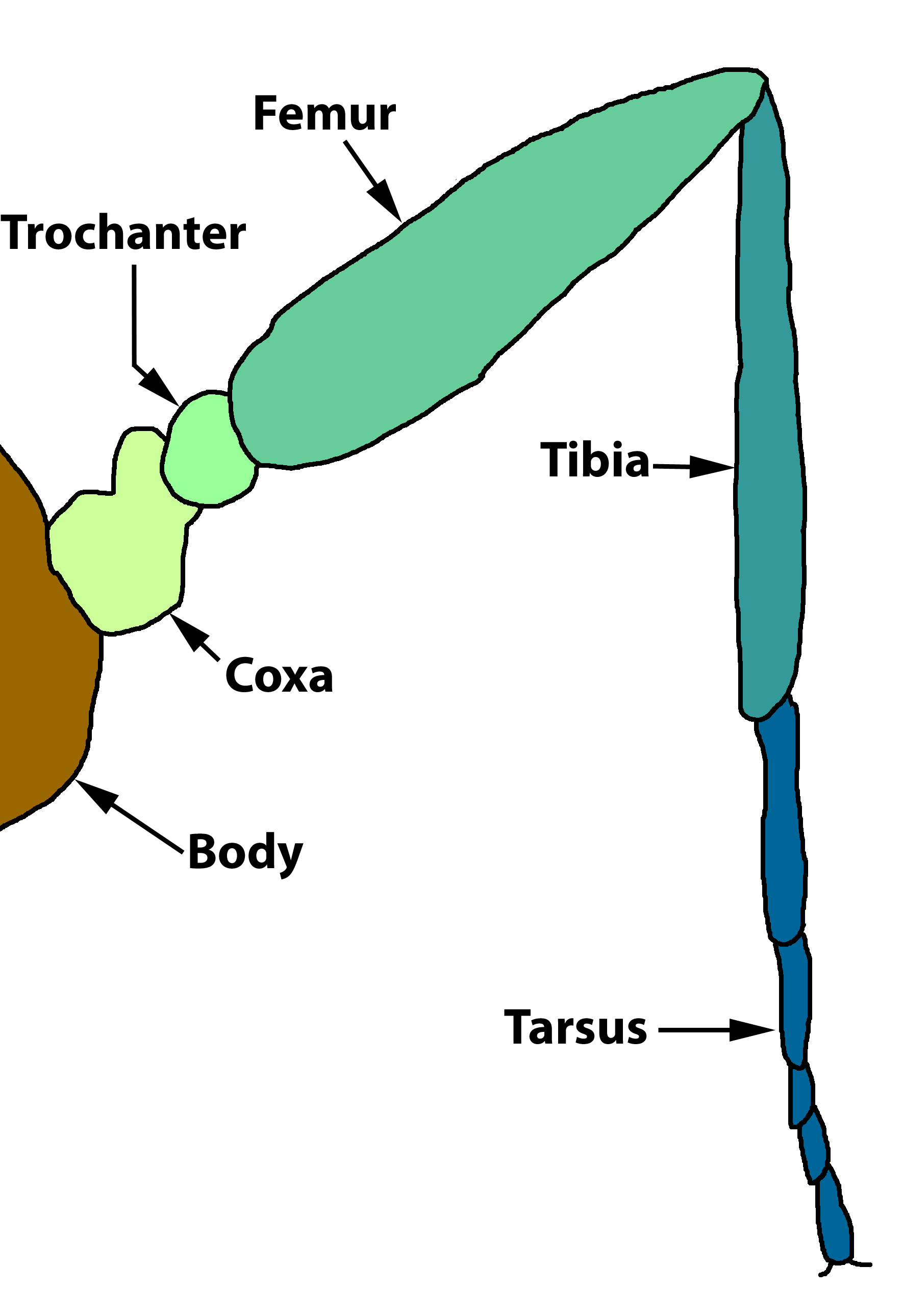
Insect leg

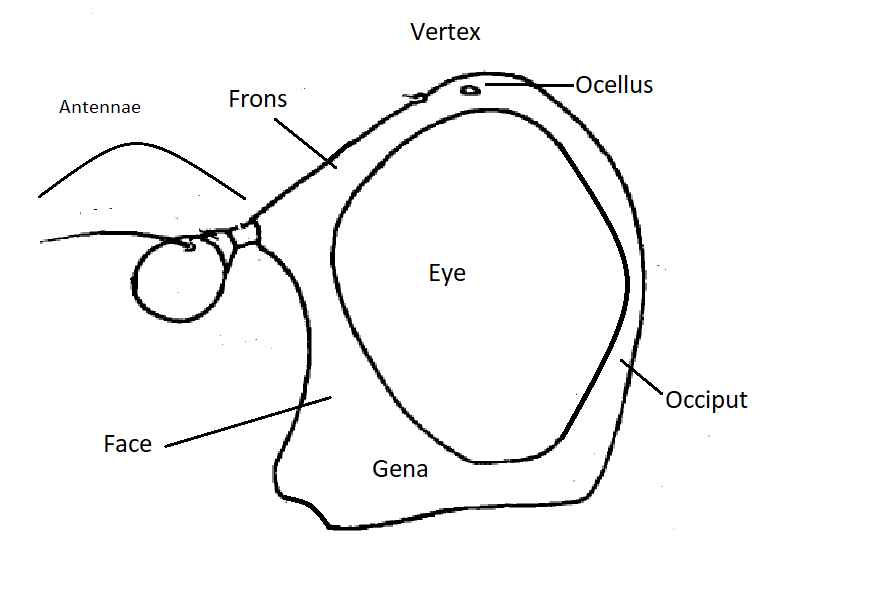
profile syrphid head

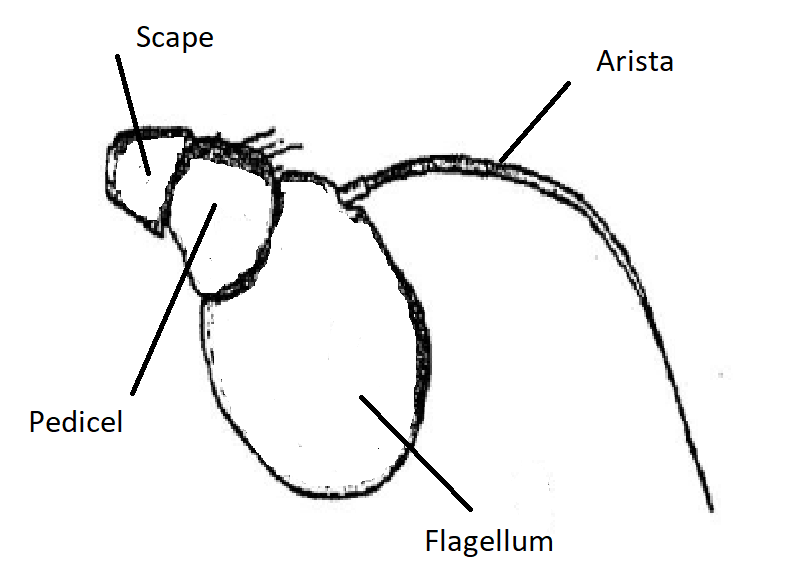
Antenna syrphid

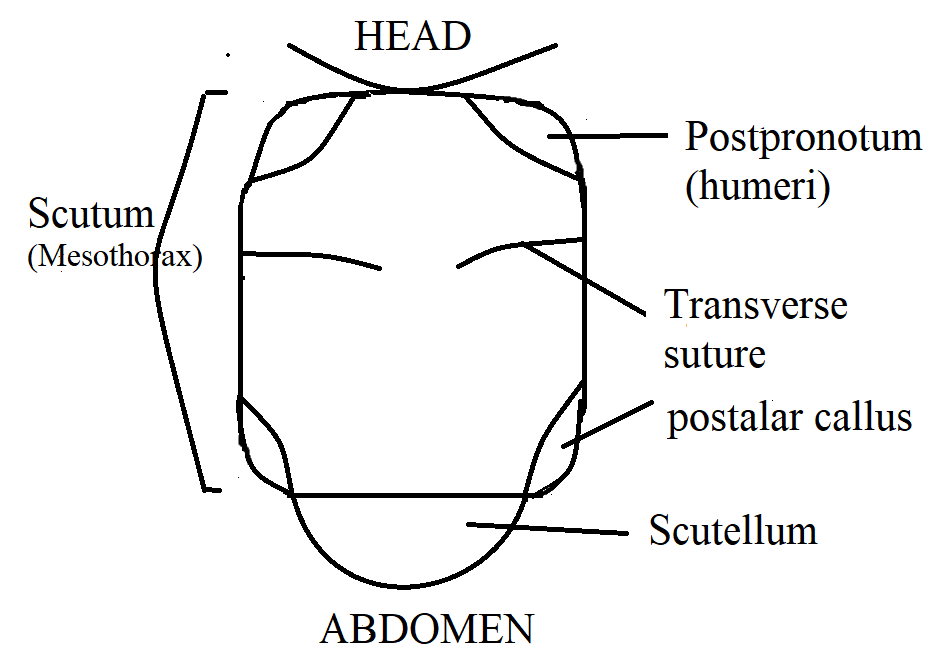
dorsal view of Syrphid thorax
