= Platycheirus inversus =

Scientific classification
- Kingdom: Animalia
- Phylum: Arthropoda
- Clade: Pancrustacea
- Class: Insecta
- Order: Diptera
- Family: Syrphidae
- Genus: Platycheirus
- Subgenus: Platycheirus
- Species: P. inversus

Binomial name
- Platycheirus inversus Ide, 1926
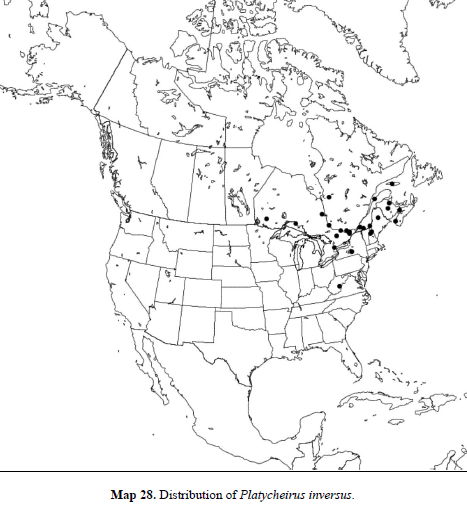
- Range map 2020

Species of fly

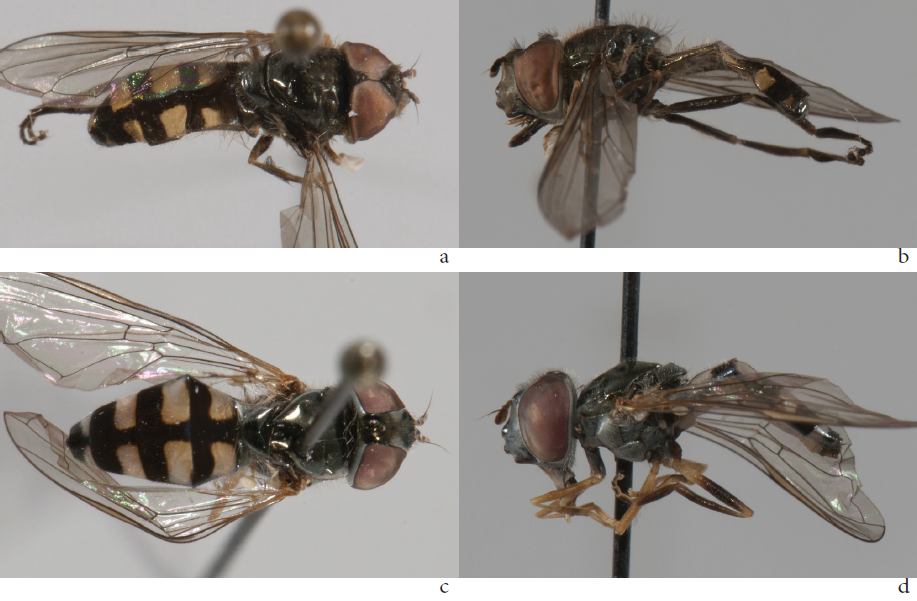
P. inversus, male above Andrew Young

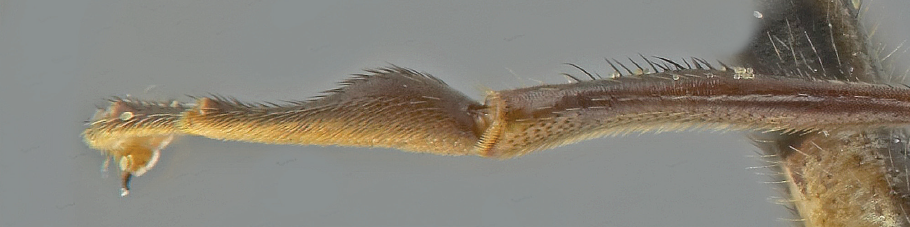
P. inversus, male front leg Andrew Young

Platycheirus inversus, the knobfoot sedgesitter, is a rare species of syrphid fly observed in Northeastern North America. Hoverflies can remain nearly motionless in flight. The adults are also known as flower flies for they are commonly found on flowers, from which they get both energy-giving nectar and protein-rich pollen. Larvae are aphid predators.

== Description male ==
For terminology see Speight key to genera and glossary or Glossary of morphological terminology Very similar to Platycheirus amplus a mostly western canada species with some overlapping range in eastern canada. P. inversus differs in that the first hind tarsomere is strongly swollen at the base, narrowing abruptly at mid-length. The wing features include the basal third of cell bm and the anterior sixth of cell cup being bare, as well as the basal half of cell c and the basal two-thirds of cell bm also being bare. (Refer to general anatomy, not this species.)

General Anatomy, click to enlarge

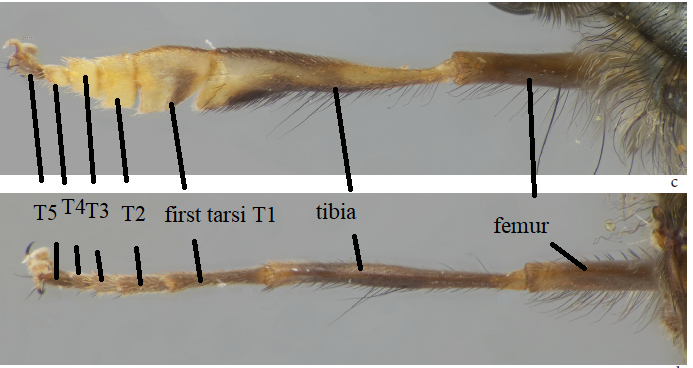
Legs

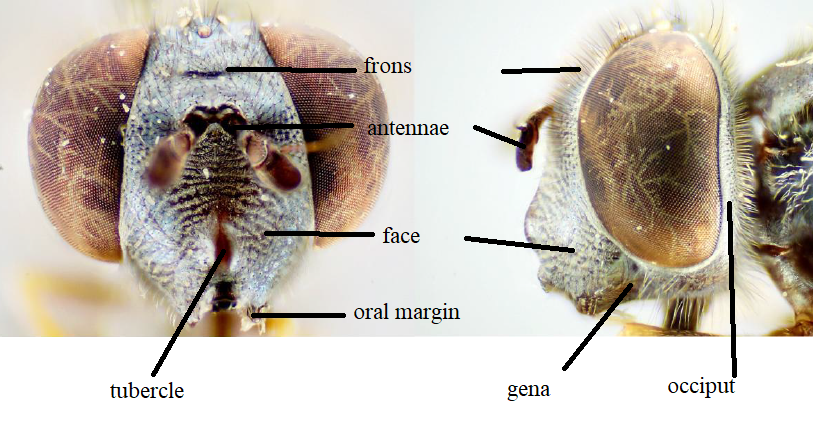
Head

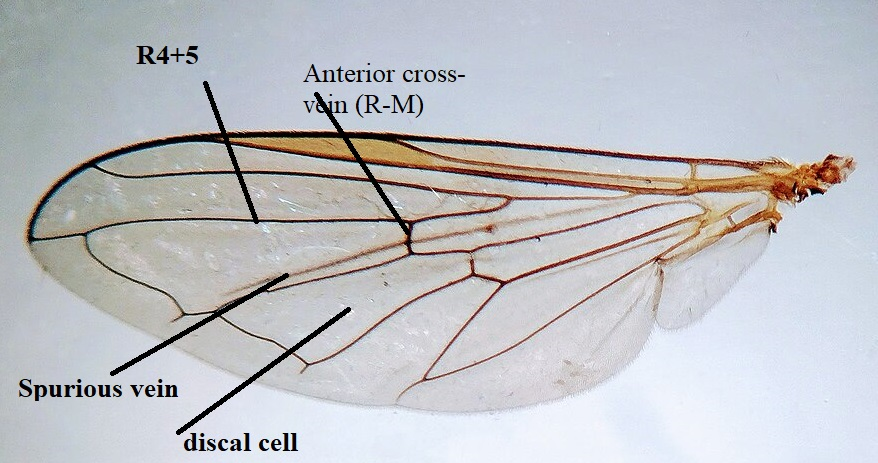
Wing

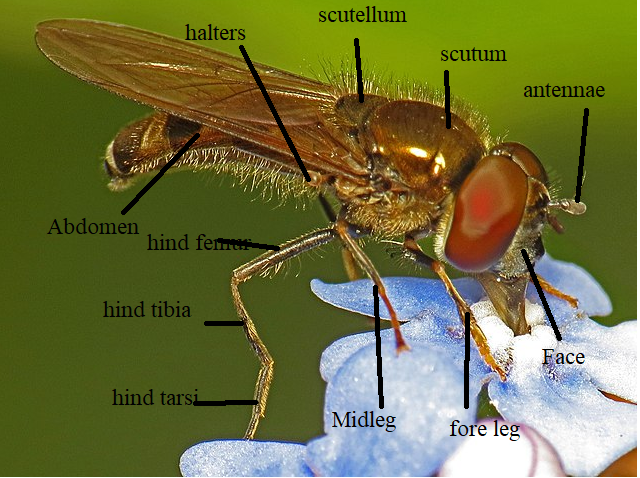
Body
