= Lejops chrysostomus =

Old name for a species of fly

Lejops chrysostomus is the former name for a species of syrphid fly which is now called Anasimyia chrysostoma. The old name is still sometimes used for the species.
