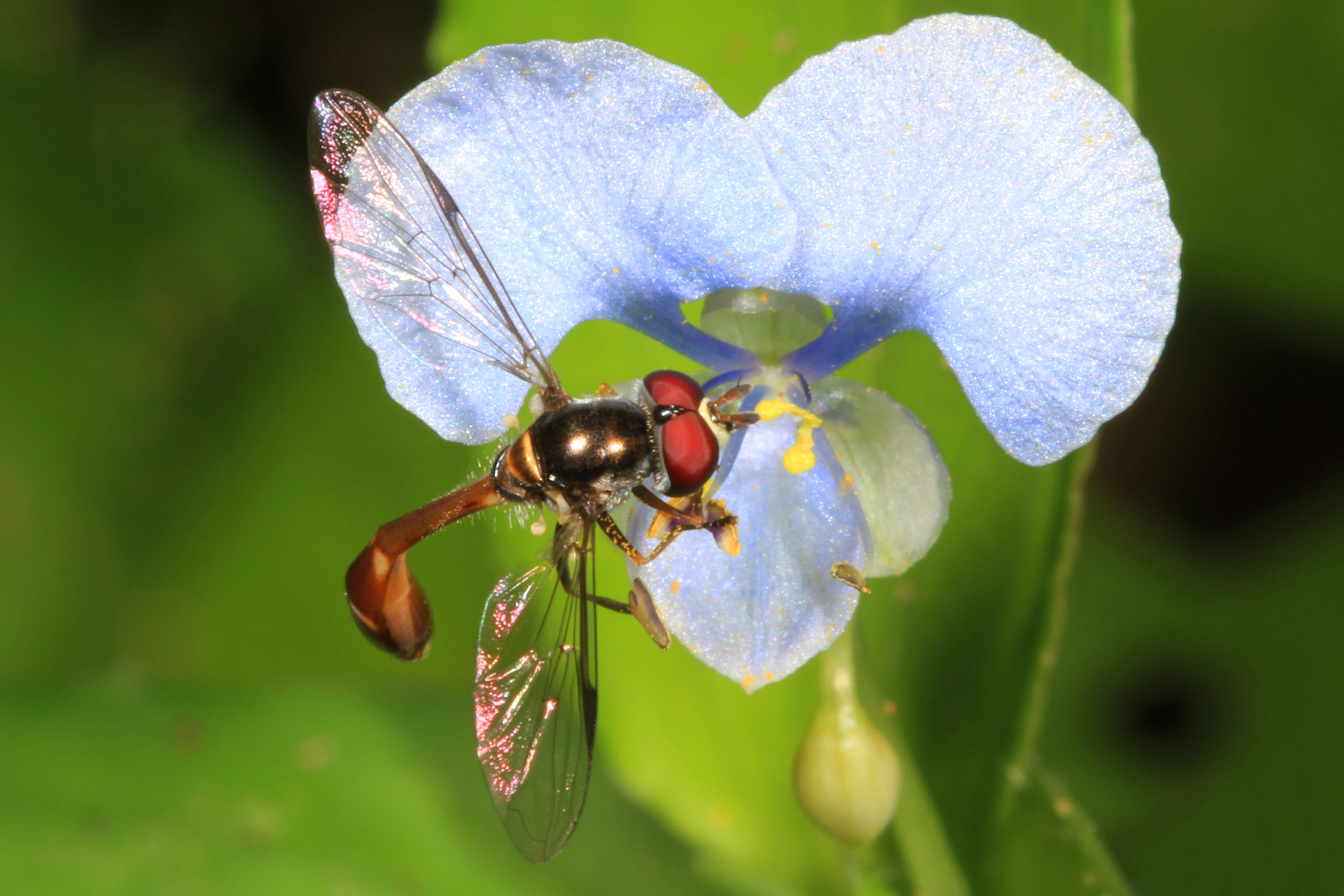
- Dioprosopa clavata

Scientific classification
- Kingdom: Animalia
- Phylum: Arthropoda
- Clade: Pancrustacea
- Class: Insecta
- Order: Diptera
- Family: Syrphidae
- Subfamily: Syrphinae
- Tribe: Syrphini
- Genus: Dioprosopa; Hull, 1949

= Dioprosopa =

Genus of flies

Dioprosopa is a genus of drone flies in the family Syrphidae. There are at least two described species in the genus Dioprosopa, both found in the New World.

Dioprosopa was formerly considered a subgenus of Pseudodoros, but was promoted to genus rank as a result of phylogenetic studies in 2018.

== Species ==
The following two species are recognised in the genus Dioprosopa:

- Dioprosopa clavata (Fabricius 1794)
- Dioprosopa vockerothi Kassebeer, 2000

== Gallery ==
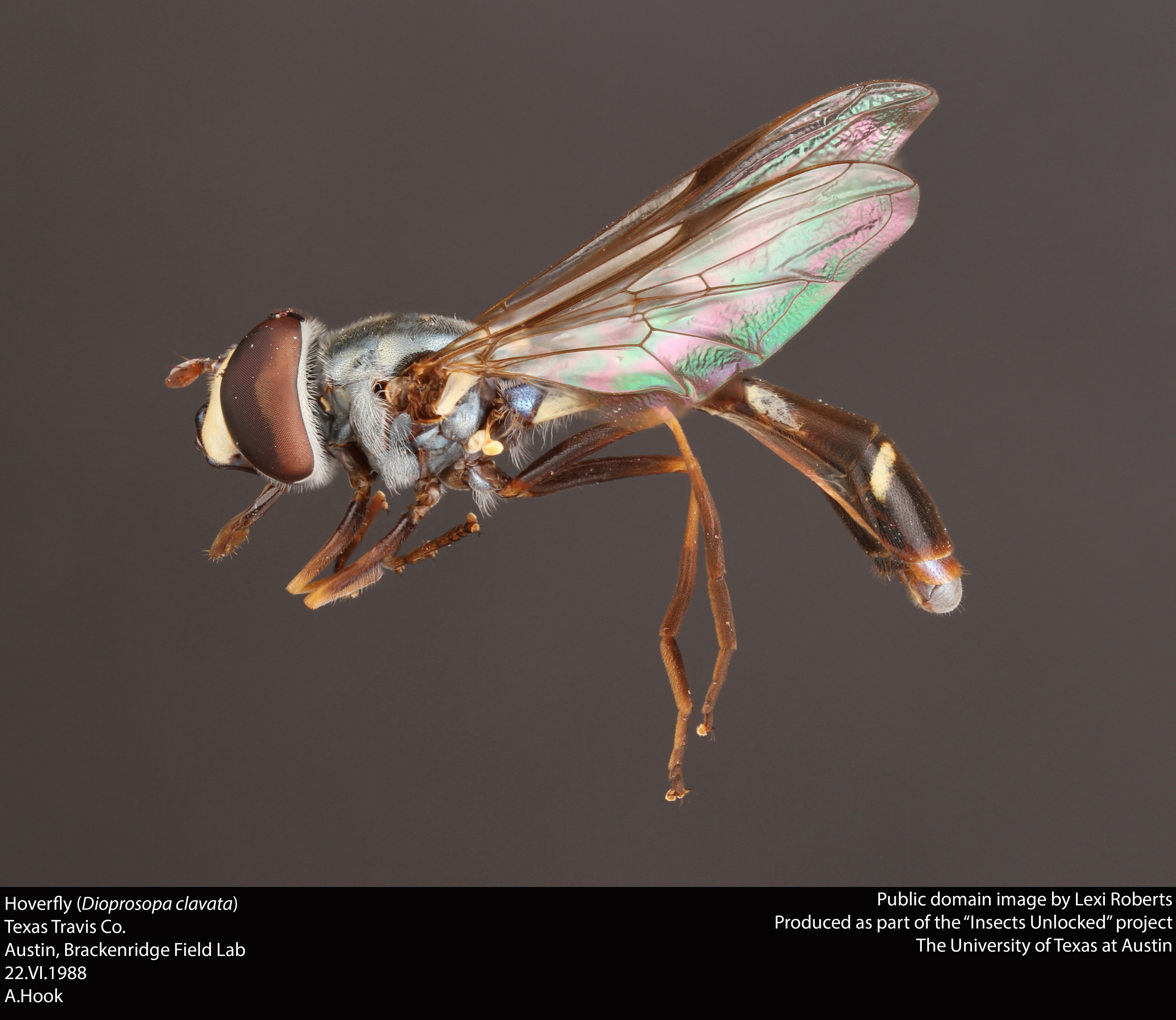
Dioprosopa clavata

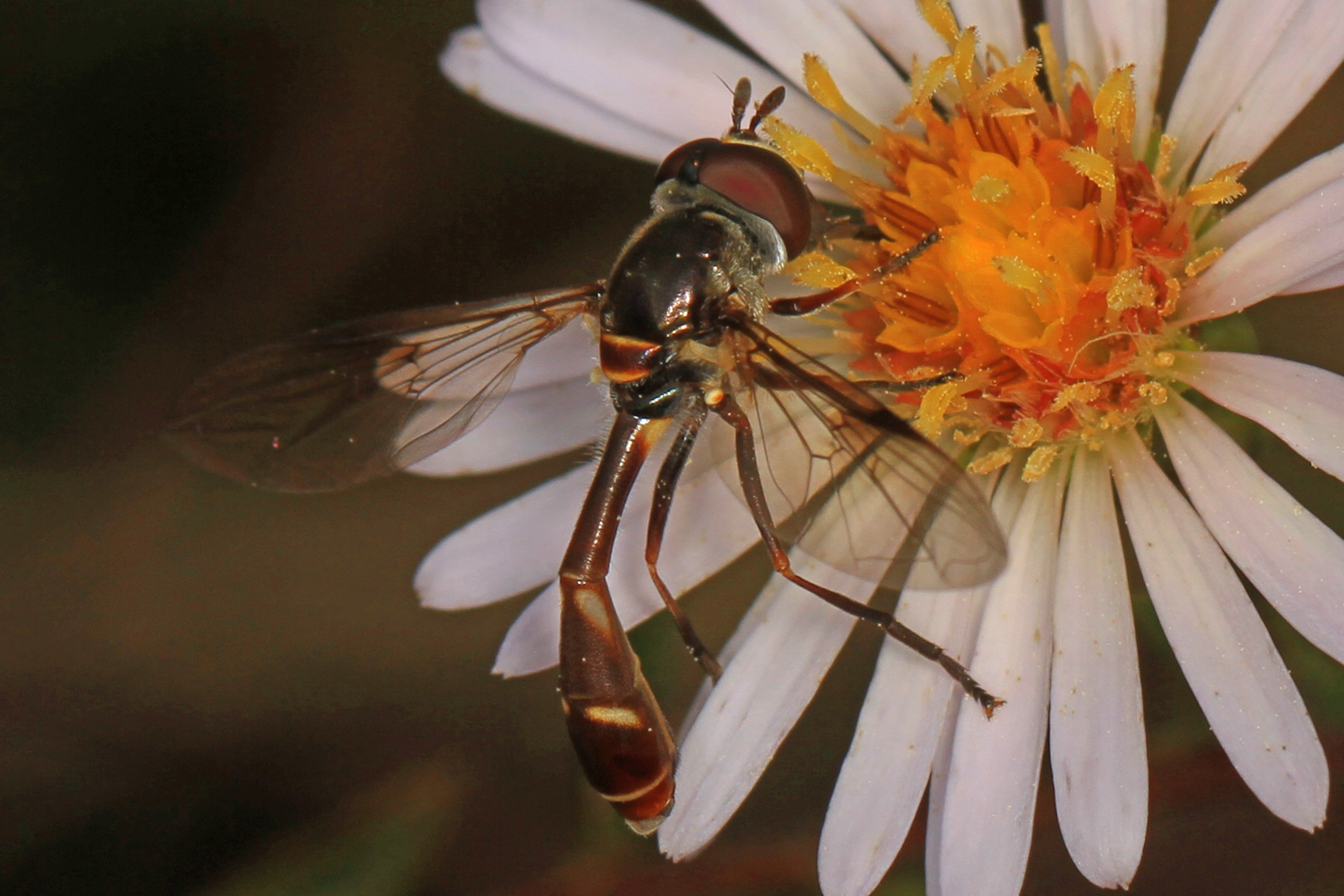
Dioprosopa clavata

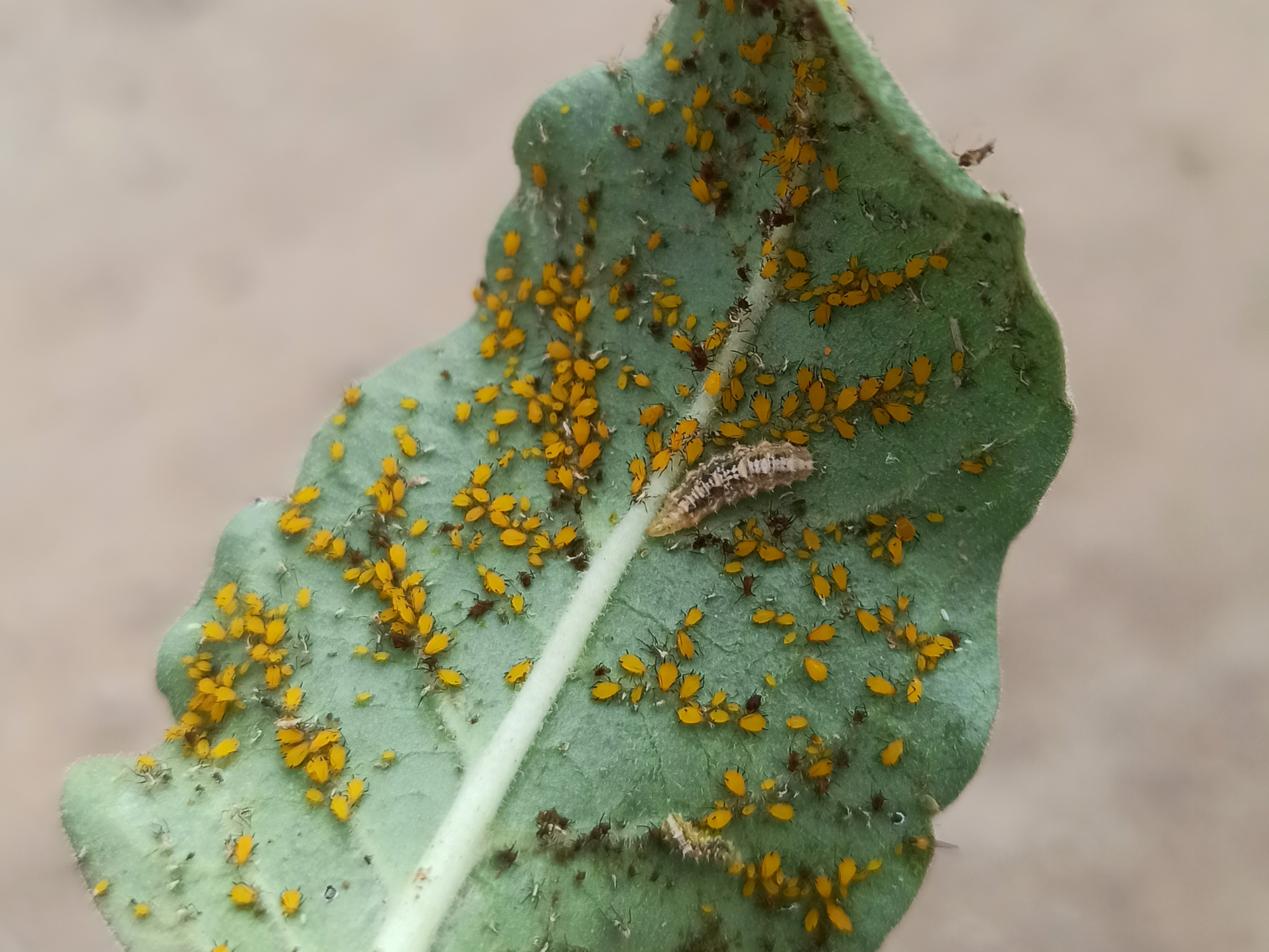
Dioprosopa clavata larva
