= Chrysosyrphus =

- Chrysosyrphus nasuta

Scientific classification
- Kingdom: Animalia
- Phylum: Arthropoda
- Clade: Pancrustacea
- Class: Insecta
- Order: Diptera
- Family: Syrphidae
- Subfamily: Eristalinae
- Tribe: Brachyopini
- Subtribe: Brachyopina
- Genus: Chrysosyrphus; Sedman, 1965

Genus of flies

Chrysosyrphus, the wrinklehead flies, is a genus of hoverflies in the family Syrphidae. They are native the holarctic region. These flies are small and black. The adults feed on nectar and pollen the sources of energy and protein respectively. Larvae are unknown.

== Diagnostics ==
For terminology see Speight key to genera and glossary The face of Chrysosyrphus is entirely black or partly yellow, and is bare medially with either a distinct tubercle clearly separated from the oral margin or is straight with a lower margin that projects. Males with bare holoptic eyes. The face is haired with only a median stripe that is bare. The hairs extend from just below the level of the antenna to the subcranial margin. The face does not have an orbital strip, and the antennae are located above the upper third of the head.. The scutellum is without bristles and has a subscutellar fringe of pile. The apical cross-vein (M_{1}) forms an acute angle with the third vein (R_{4+5}).

== Species ==
- C. alaskensis (Shannon, 1922)
- C. frontosus (Bigot, 1884)
- C. latus (Loew, 1863)
- C. montanus Violovitsh, 1978
- C. nasuta (Zetterstedt, 1838)
- C. niger (Zetterstedt, 1843)
- C. nigripennis (Williston, 1882)
- C. tundrarum Violovitsh, 1978
