= Platycheirus podagratus =

Scientific classification
- Kingdom: Animalia
- Phylum: Arthropoda
- Clade: Pancrustacea
- Class: Insecta
- Order: Diptera
- Family: Syrphidae
- Genus: Platycheirus
- Subgenus: Platycheirus
- Species: P. podagratus

Binomial name
- Platycheirus podagratus (Zetterstedt, 1838)

Species of fly

Platycheirus podagratus is a species of hoverfly. It is found in the Holarctic.

== Description ==
Tibiae 1 is strongly and rapidly broadened on the apical third (slightly narrower apically than preapically). Leg 3 is black with a yellow knee. The abdomen is slender.

See references for determination.

== Distribution ==
Palearctic: Fennoscandia south to the Pyrenees, Ireland eastward through Northern Europe and mountainous parts of Central Europe into Russia and on to Southeast Siberia. Nearctic: Alberta and Ontario.

== Biology ==
Habitat: Fen, margins of lakes, rivers and brooks in unimproved grassland, taiga and moor; unimproved montane and alpine grassland. It flies from the end of May to mid-August.
