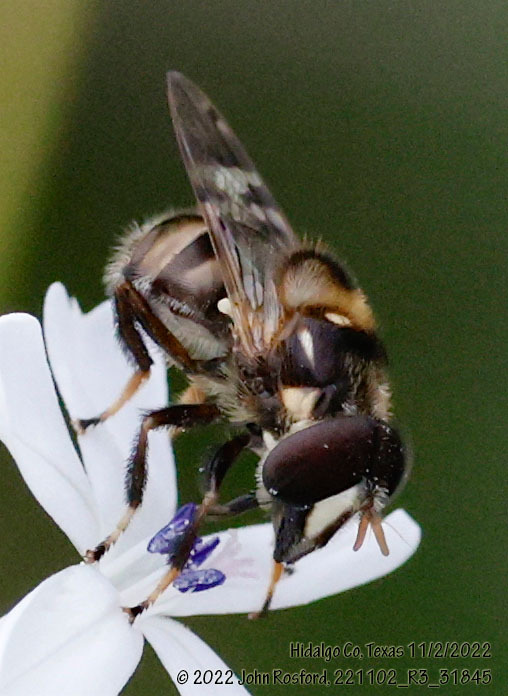
- Copestylum tamaulipanum, Texas

Scientific classification
- Kingdom: Animalia
- Phylum: Arthropoda
- Class: Insecta
- Order: Diptera
- Family: Syrphidae
- Genus: Copestylum
- Species: C. tamaulipanum

Binomial name
- Copestylum tamaulipanum (Townsend, 1898)

Synonyms
- Volucella tamaulipanum Townsend, 1898; Volucella timberlakei Curran, 1926

= Copestylum tamaulipanum =

Species of fly

Copestylum tamaulipanum is a species of hoverfly from the family Syrphidae, which lives around the Mexico–United States border.
