= Platycheirus perpallidus =

Scientific classification
- Kingdom: Animalia
- Phylum: Arthropoda
- Clade: Pancrustacea
- Class: Insecta
- Order: Diptera
- Family: Syrphidae
- Genus: Platycheirus
- Subgenus: Platycheirus
- Species: P. perpallidus

Binomial name
- Platycheirus perpallidus Verrall, 1901

Species of fly

Platycheirus perpallidus is a species of hoverfly. It is a Holarctic species.

== Description ==
External images For terms, see: Morphology of Diptera. Anteroventral black hairs are strongly bent towards the base of the femur 2; Tibia 1 uniformly widened from base to apex.

See references for determination

== Distribution ==
Palearctic: Norway and Finland south to northern France, Ireland east through Northern Europe and central Europe into European Russia and on through Siberia and the Russian Far East to the Pacific coast;Nearctic: from Alaska to New Brunswick and south to Utah.

== Biology ==
Habitat: Sedge and reed beds in fen and mire and along rivers or the edge of lakes. Flies April to September.
