= Sphiximorpha durani =

Conservation status
- Vulnerable (NatureServe)

Scientific classification
- Kingdom: Animalia
- Phylum: Arthropoda
- Class: Insecta
- Order: Diptera
- Family: Syrphidae
- Genus: Sphiximorpha
- Species: S. durani

Binomial name
- Sphiximorpha durani Davidson, 1925

Species of insect

Sphiximorpha durani, commonly referred to as Duran's wasp fly, is a hoverfly in the family Syrphidae found in the western U.S. states of California and Oregon. These flies are notable for their resemblance to wasps, using a distinctive frontal prominence (head extension) to mimic wasp antennae, aiding their mimicry within the tribe Cerioidini.
