= Ceriana mime =

Scientific classification
- Kingdom: Animalia
- Phylum: Arthropoda
- Clade: Pancrustacea
- Class: Insecta
- Order: Diptera
- Family: Syrphidae
- Tribe: Cerioidini
- Genus: Ceriana
- Species: C. mime

Binomial name
- Ceriana mime (Hull, 1935)

Synonyms
- Tenthredomyia mime Hull, 1935

Species of fly

Ceriana mime is a species of syrphid fly in the family Syrphidae.
