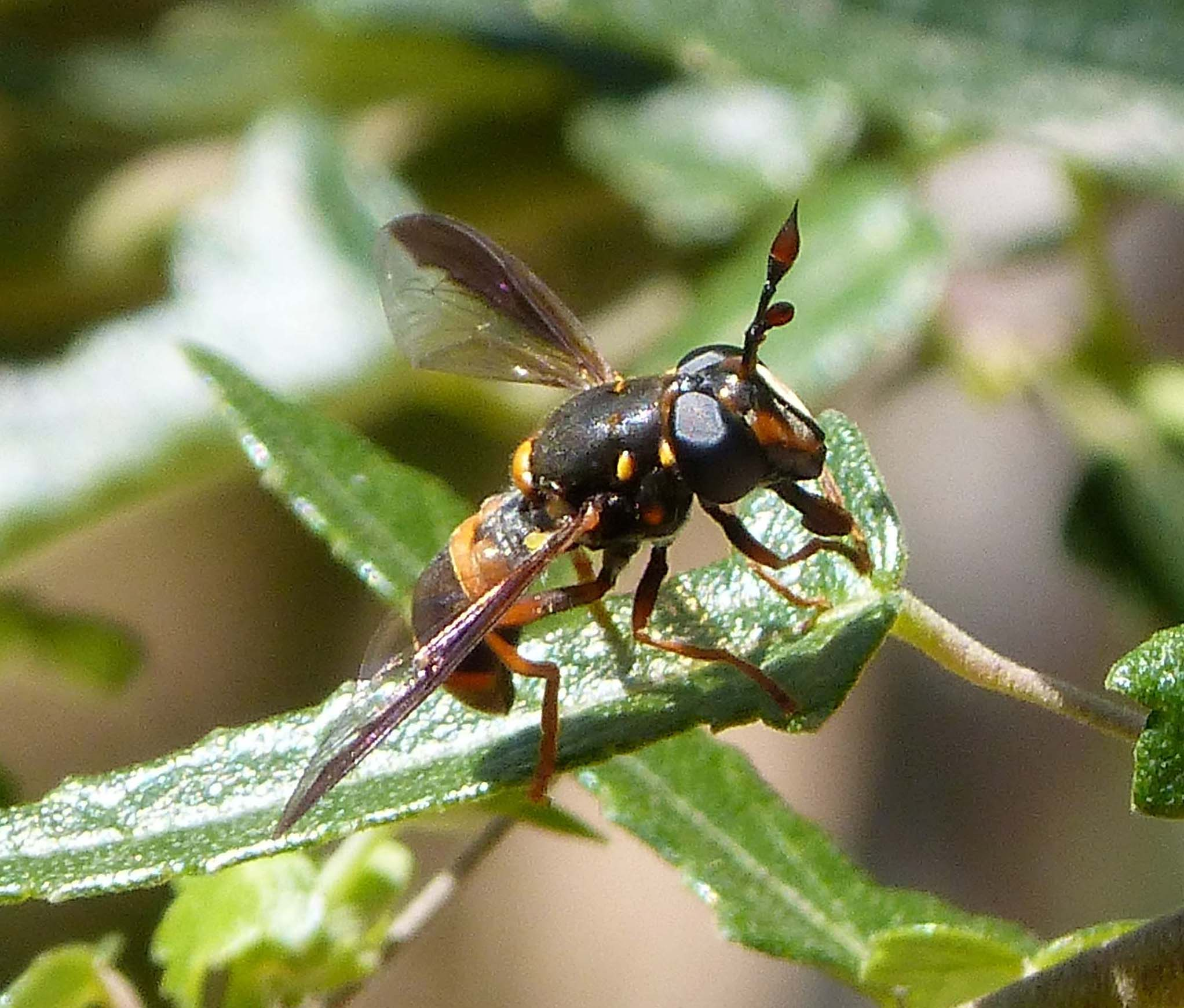

Scientific classification
- Kingdom: Animalia
- Phylum: Arthropoda
- Clade: Pancrustacea
- Class: Insecta
- Order: Diptera
- Family: Syrphidae
- Genus: Ceriana
- Species: C. ornata

Binomial name
- Ceriana ornata Saunders 1845

Synonyms
- Cerioides ornata

= Ceriana ornata =

Species of fly

Ceriana ornata is an Australian species of hoverfly in the family Syrphidae. Resembling a wasp, this hoverfly preys on other insects including Australian native bees and the planthopper.

C. ornata can be distinguished from wasps by its distinct Y-shaped antenna, large compound eyes and only has two wings.
