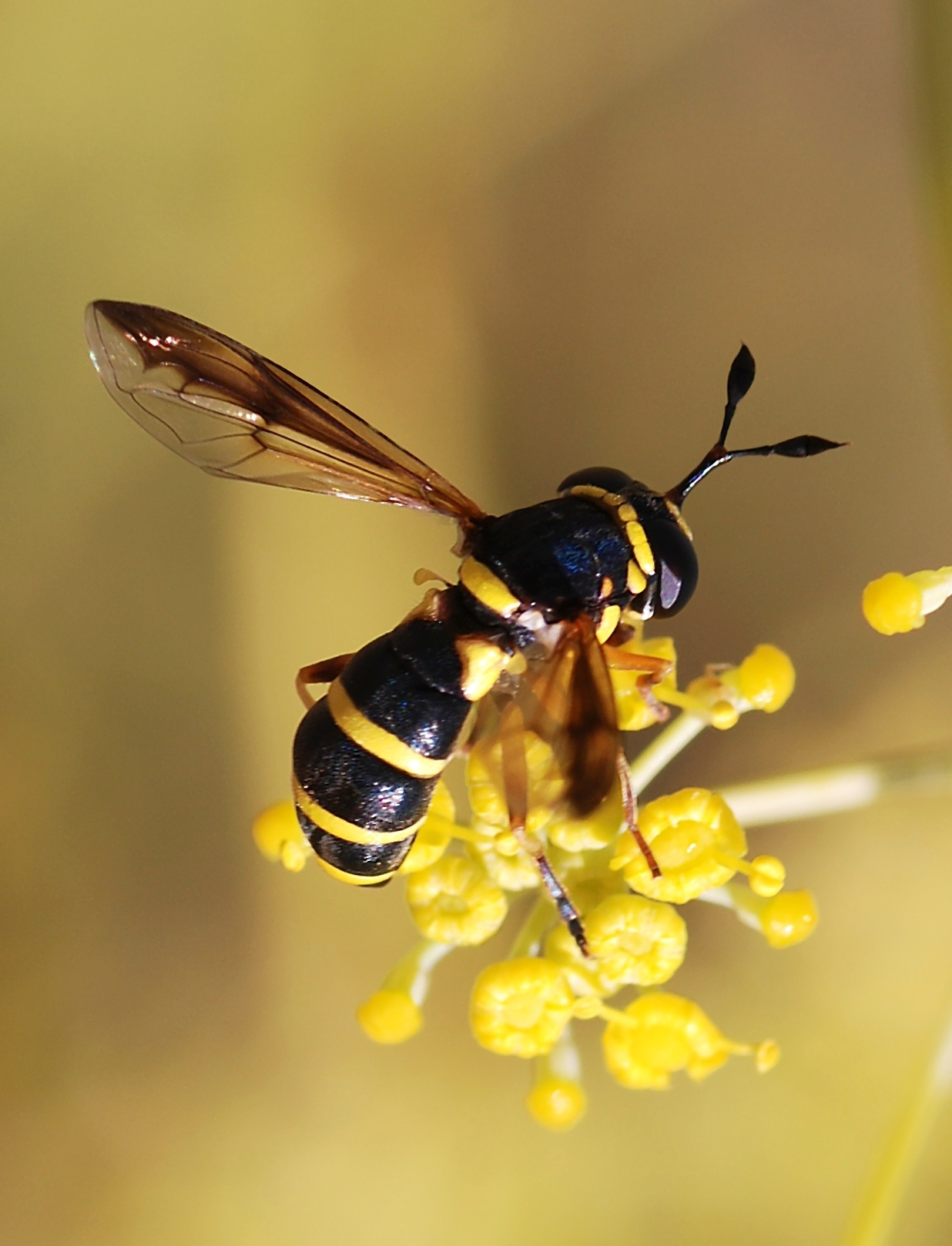
- Ceriana vespiformis

Scientific classification
- Kingdom: Animalia
- Phylum: Arthropoda
- Class: Insecta
- Order: Diptera
- Family: Syrphidae
- Subfamily: Eristalinae
- Tribe: Cerioidini
- Genus: Ceriana; Rafinesque, 1815

= Ceriana (fly) =

Genus of flies

Ceriana is a genus of hoverfly. All species are wasp mimics.

== Systematics ==
Species include:

- C. abbreviata Loew, 1864
- C. alboseta (Ferguson, 1926)
- C. ancoralis (Coquillett, 1902)
- C. annulifera (Walker, 1861)
- C.antipoda (Bigot 1860)
- C.apicalis (Ferguson 1926)
- C.aurata (Curran 1927)
- C.australis (Macquart 1850)
- C.brevis (Brunetti, 1923)
- C. brunettii (Shannon, 1927)
- C. brunettii (Shannon 1927)
- C. brunnea (Hull, 1944)
- C. cacica (Walker, 1860)
- C. caesarea (Stackelberg, 1928)
- C. caucasica (Paramonov, 1927)
- C. chekiangensis (Ôuchi, 1943)
- C. chiefengensis (Ôuchi, 1943)
- C. compacta (Brunetti, 1907)
- C. conopsoides (Linnaeus, 1758)
- C. cylindrica (Curran, 1921)
- C. dilatipes (Brunetti, 1929)
- C. dimidiatipennis (Brunetti, 1923)
- C. dirickxi (Thompson, 2013)
- C. divisa (Walker, 1857)
- C. durani (Davidson, 1925)
- C. euphara (Riek, 1954)
- C. formosensis (Shiraki, 1930)
- C. gibbosa Violovitsh, 1980
- C. glaebosa (Steenis, Ricartean Steenis, Ricarte, Vujic, Birtele & Speight, 2016)
- C. hungkingi (Shannon, 1927)
- C. ismayi (Thompson, 2015)
- C. lypra (Riek, 1954)
- C. macquarti Shannon, 1925
- C. mellivora (Shannon, 1927)
- C. mime (Hull, 1935)
- C. naja Violovitsh, 1974
- C. oceanica (Hull, 1944)
- C. optata (Riek, 1954)
- C. opuntiae (Ferguson, 1926)
- C. ornata (Saunders 1845)
- C. opuntiae (Ferguson, 1926)
- C. ornatifrons (Brunetti, 1915)
- C. pedicellata (Williston, 1887)
- C. pictula (Loew, 1853)
- C. platypus (Ferguson, 1926)
- C. ponti (Thompson, 2013)
- C. relictura (Walker, 1858)
- C. rieki (Goot, 1964)
- C. sartorum Smirnov, 1924
- C. saundersi (Shannon, 1925)
- C. skevingtoni (Steenis, Ricartean Steenis, Ricarte, Vujic, Birtele & Speight, 2016)
- C. smaragdina (Walker, 1858)
- C. snowi (Adams, 1904)
- C. sphenotoma (Riek, 1954)
- C. tridens (Loew, 1872)
- C. vespiformis (Latreille, 1804)
- C. wyatti (Thompson, 2015)

== Gallery ==
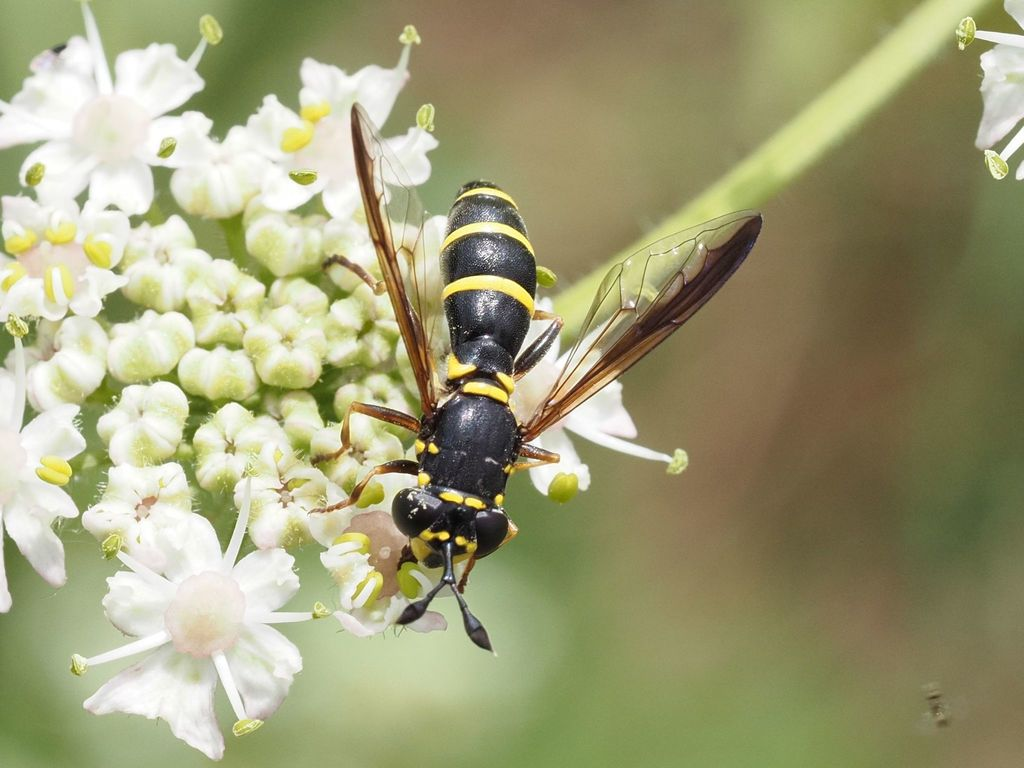
Ceriana conopsoides

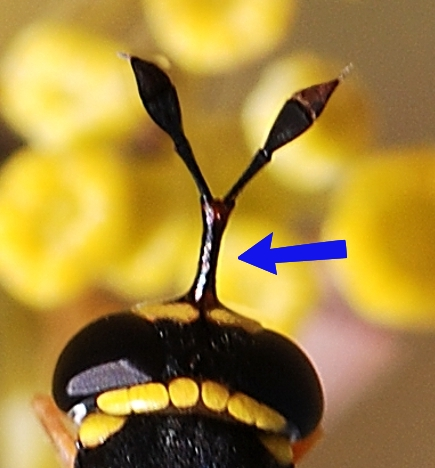
Frontal prominence

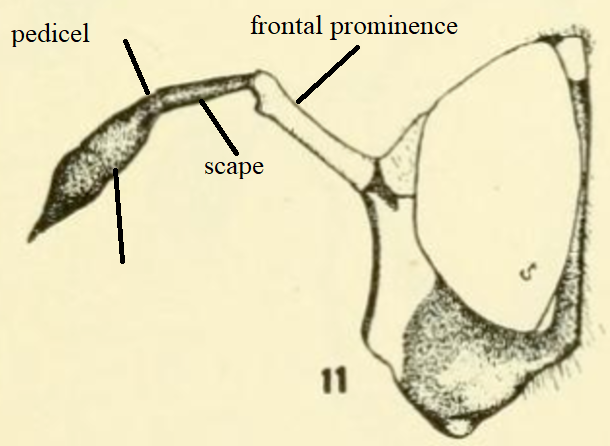
Antennae

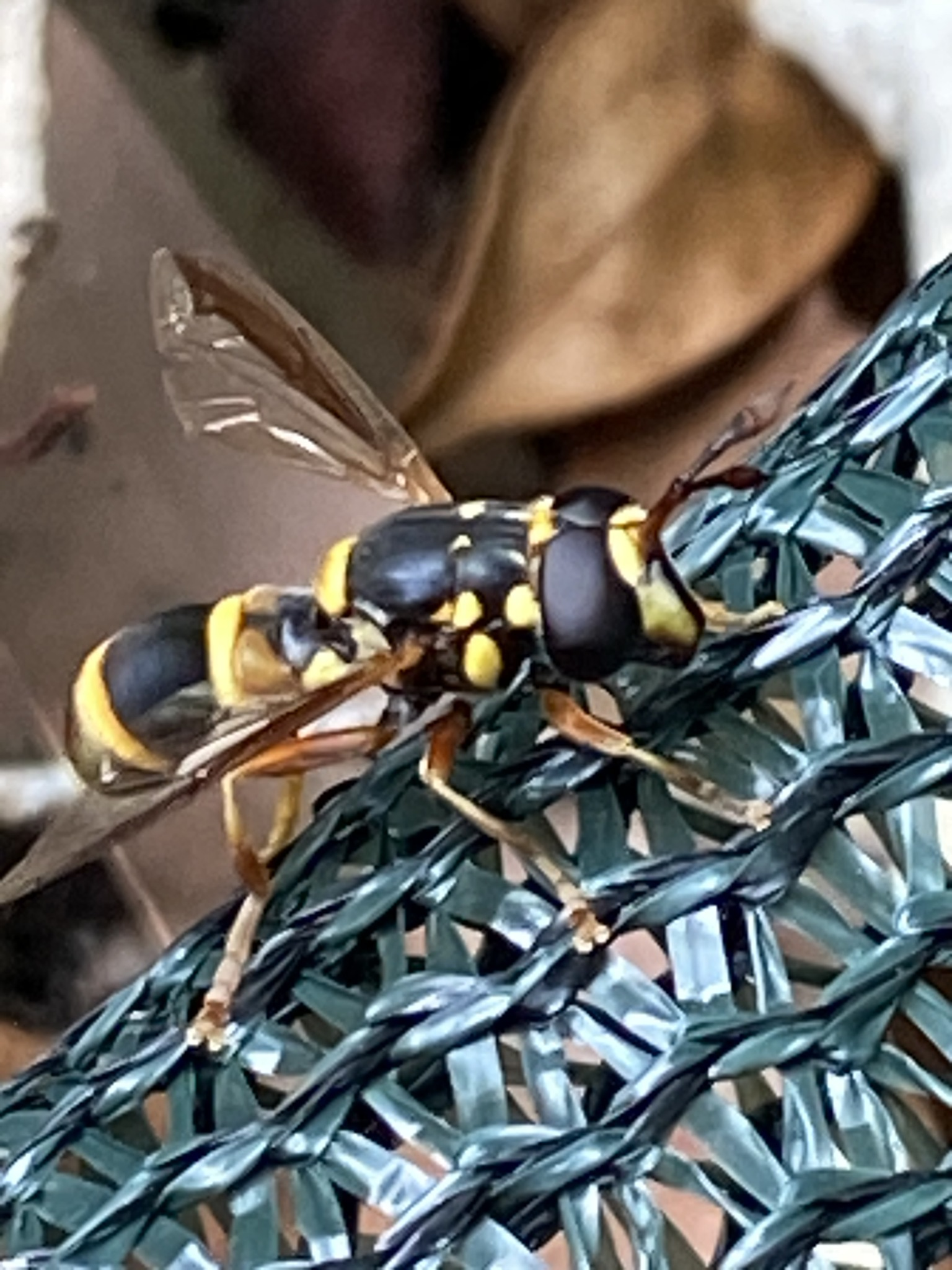
Ceriana ornata

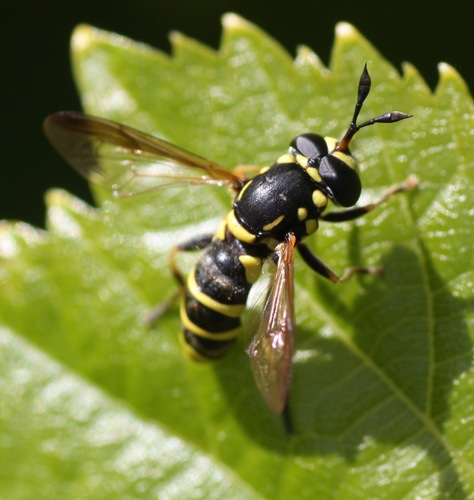
Ceriana ornata

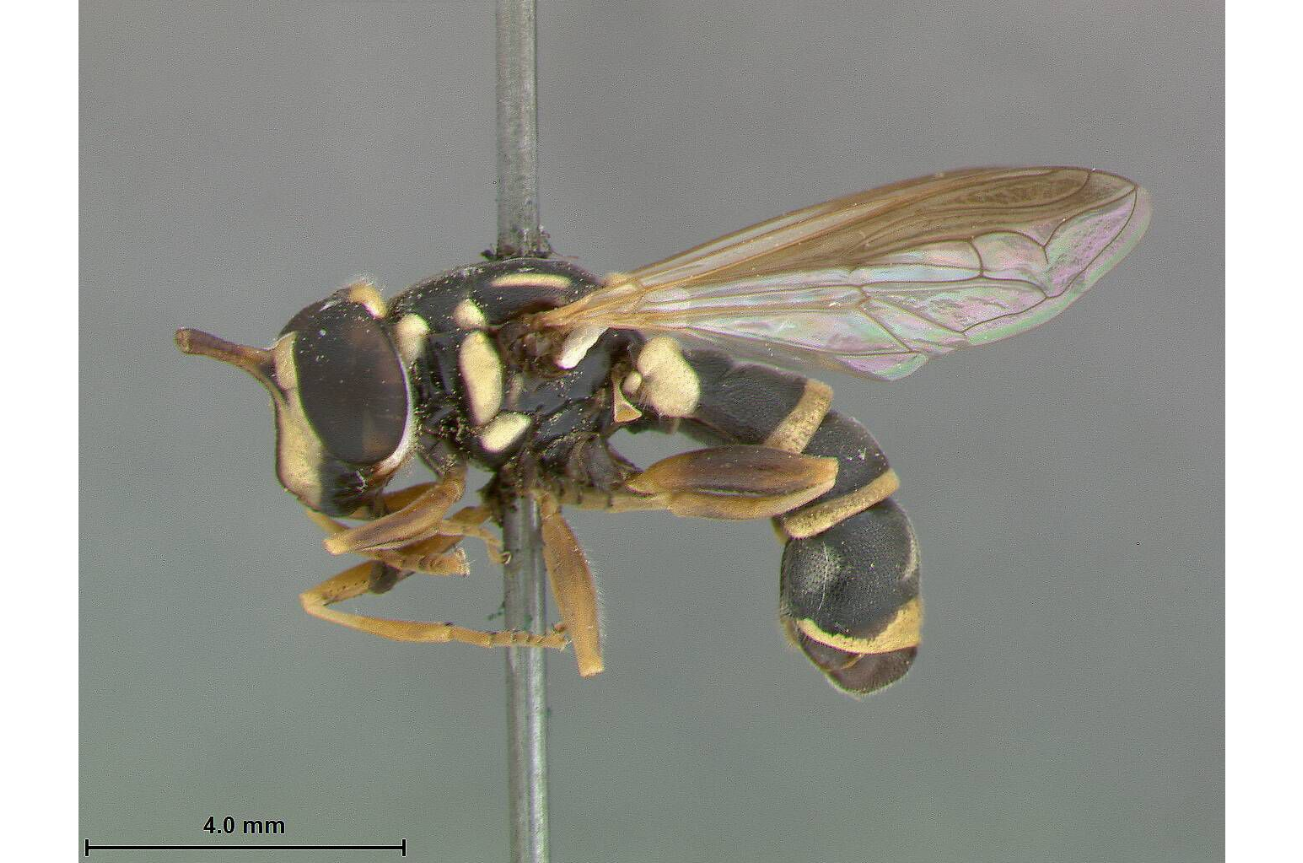
Ceriana ancoralis

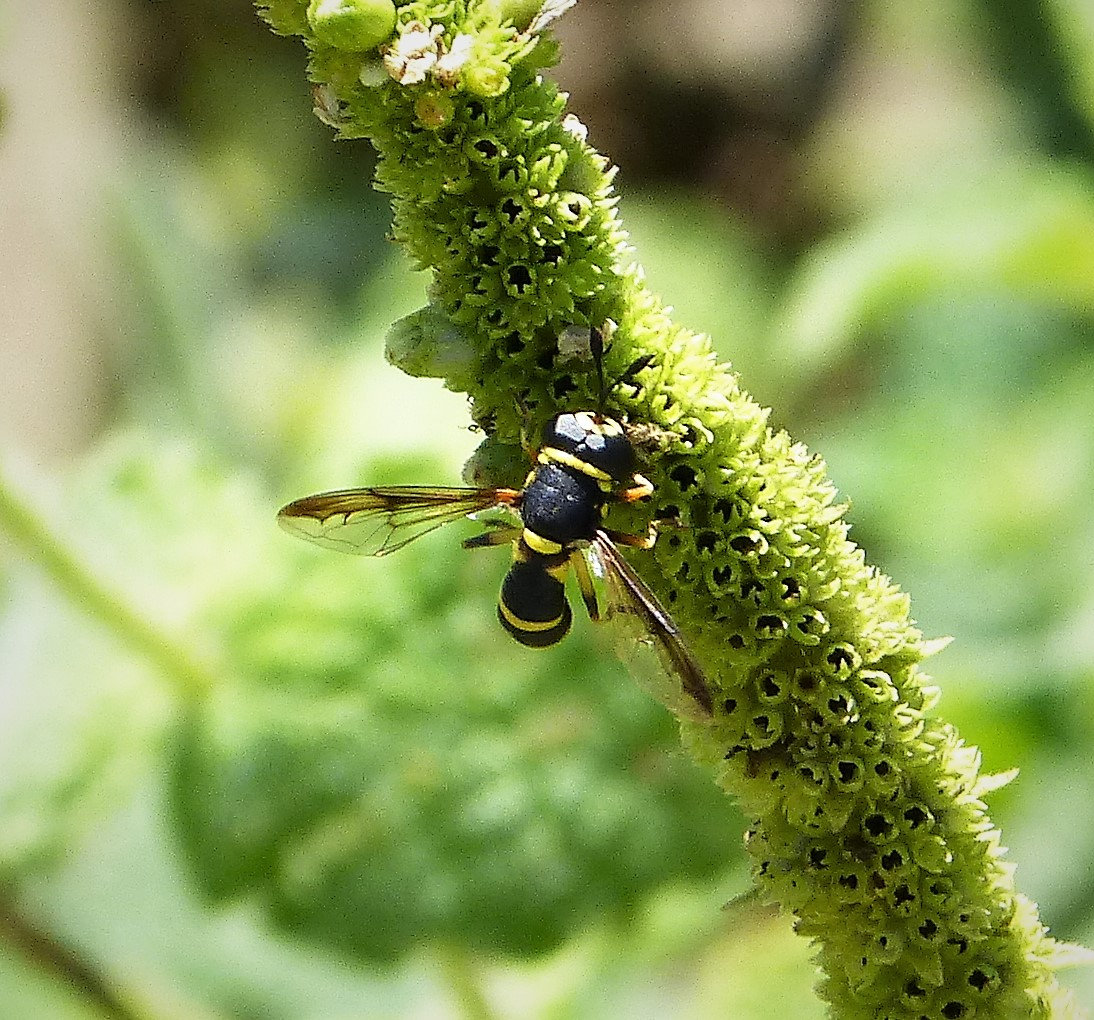
Ceriana vespiformis

Ceriana wing veins
