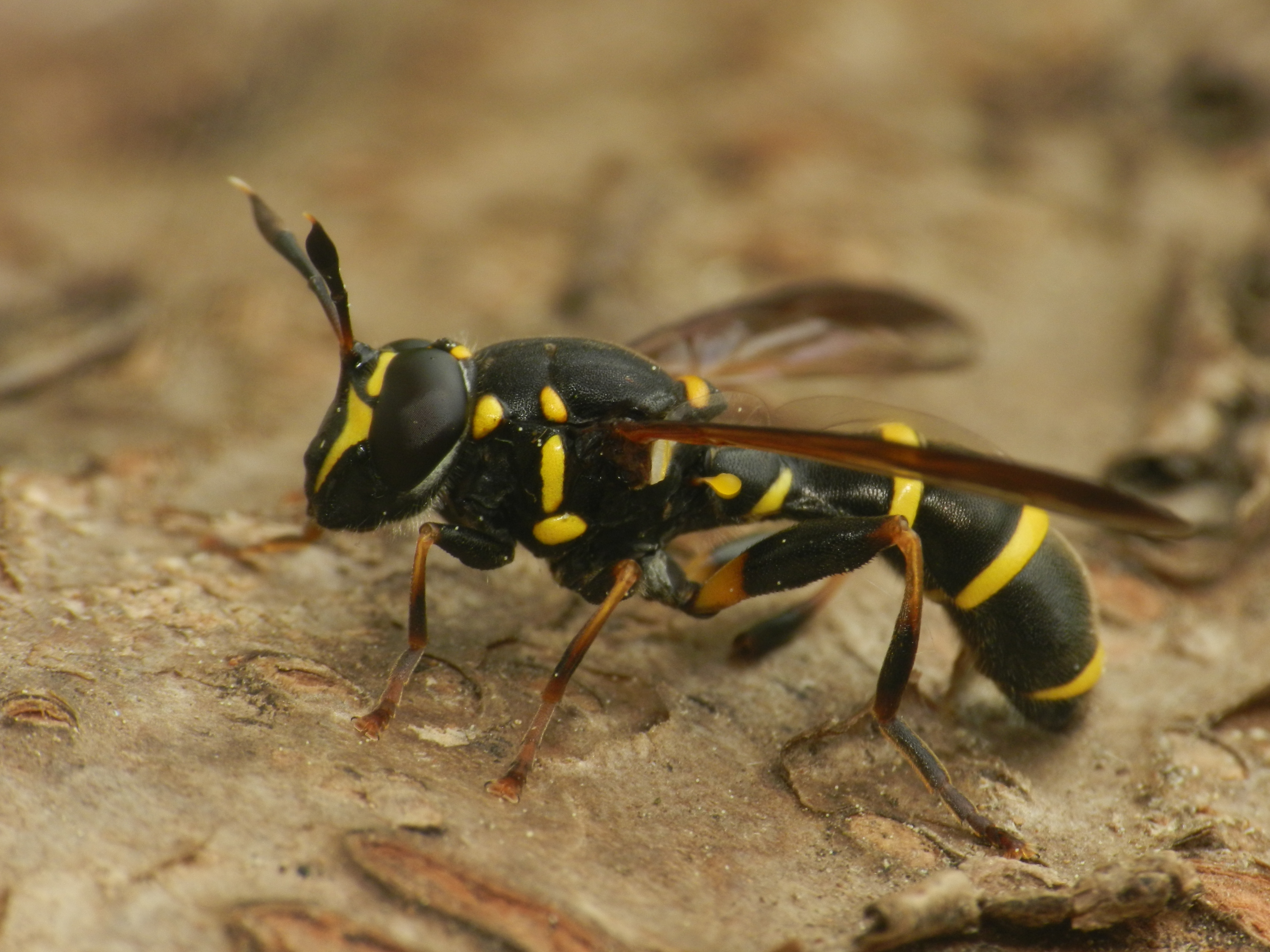
- Sphiximorpha subsessilis

Scientific classification
- Domain: Eukaryota
- Kingdom: Animalia
- Phylum: Arthropoda
- Class: Insecta
- Order: Diptera
- Family: Syrphidae
- Subfamily: Eristalinae
- Tribe: Cerioidini
- Genus: Sphiximorpha; Rondani 1850

= Sphiximorpha =

Genus of flies

Sphiximorpha is a genus of hoverfly.

== Systematics ==
Species include:

- Sphiximorpha africana (Hull, 1944)
- Sphiximorpha alaplicata (Hardy, 1945)
- Sphiximorpha barbiger (Loew, 1853)
- Sphiximorpha barbipes (Loew, 1853)
- Sphiximorpha bezzii (Hervé-Bazin, 1913)
- Sphiximorpha bigotii (Williston, 1888)
- Sphiximorpha bigotii (Williston, 1888)
- Sphiximorpha boliviana (Kertész, 1903)
- Sphiximorpha brauerii (Williston, 1888)
- Sphiximorpha brevilumbata (Yang & Cheng, 1998)
- Sphiximorpha breviscapa (Saunders, 1845)
- Sphiximorpha bulbosa (Meijere, 1924)
- Sphiximorpha cylindrica (Curran, 1921)
- Sphiximorpha decorata (Brunetti, 1923)
- Sphiximorpha delicatula (Hull, 1941)
- Sphiximorpha dentipes (Doesburg, 1955)
- Sphiximorpha durani (Davidson, 1925)
- Sphiximorpha facialis (Kertész, 1903)
- Sphiximorpha flavosignata (Kertész, 1902)
- Sphiximorpha fruhstorferi (Meijere, 1908)
- Sphiximorpha fulvescens (Brunetti, 1915)
- Sphiximorpha garibaldii (Rondani, 1860)
- Sphiximorpha kerteszi (Shannon, 1925)
- Sphiximorpha loewii (Williston, 1887)
- Sphiximorpha mallea (Hull, 1945)
- Sphiximorpha marginalis (Bezzi, 1915)
- Sphiximorpha mcalpinei (Thompson, 2012)
- Sphiximorpha meadei (Williston, 1892)
- Sphiximorpha meijerei (Shannon, 1927)
- Sphiximorpha mikii (Williston, 1888)
- Sphiximorpha minuta (Hull, 1944)
- Sphiximorpha nigripennis (Williston, 1887)
- Sphiximorpha petronillae (Rondani, 1850)
- Sphiximorpha phya (Riek, 1954)
- Sphiximorpha picta (Kertész, 1902)
- Sphiximorpha polista (Séguy, 1948)
- Sphiximorpha polistes (Curran, 1941)
- Sphiximorpha polistiformis (Hull, 1944)
- Sphiximorpha pyrrhocera (Kertész, 1903)
- Sphiximorpha rachmaninovi (Violovich, 1981)
- Sphiximorpha roederii (Williston, 1888)
- Sphiximorpha rubrobrunnea (Hull, 1944)
- Sphiximorpha sackenii (Williston, 1888)
- Sphiximorpha shannoni (Lane & Carrera, 1943)
- Sphiximorpha siamensis (Curran, 1931)
- Sphiximorpha sinensis (Ôuchi, 1943)
- Sphiximorpha subcastanea (Brunetti, 1929)
- Sphiximorpha subsessilis (Illiger, 1807)
- Sphiximorpha superba (Williston, 1887)
- Sphiximorpha triangulifera (Brunetti, 1913)
- Sphiximorpha trichopoda (Kertész, 1903)
- Sphiximorpha variabilis (Kertész, 1903)
- Sphiximorpha vicina (Kertész, 1902)
- Sphiximorpha willistoni (Kahl, 1897)
- Sphiximorpha worelli (Bradescu, 1972)
- Sphiximorpha wulpii (Williston, 1888)
- Sphiximorpha yoshikawai (Sasakawa, 1960)
- Sphiximorpha ziegleri (Gilasian, Vujic, Hauser & Parchami-Araghi, 2017 )
