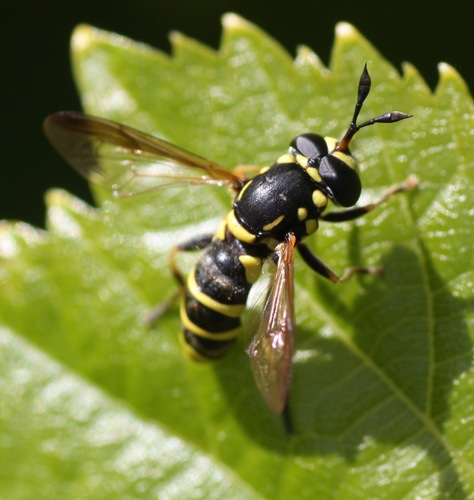
- Ceriana tridens male

Scientific classification
- Domain: Eukaryota
- Kingdom: Animalia
- Phylum: Arthropoda
- Class: Insecta
- Order: Diptera
- Family: Syrphidae
- Genus: Ceriana
- Species: C. tridens

Binomial name
- Ceriana tridens (Loew, 1872)

Synonyms
- Ceria tridens Loew, 1872

= Ceriana tridens =

Species of fly

Ceriana tridens is a species of syrphid fly found within the family Syrphidae. It can be found in Western North America.
