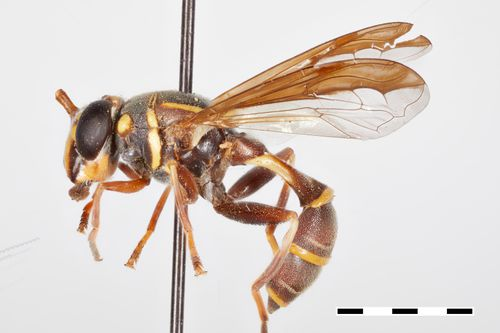
- Polybiomyia engelhardti missing antennae

Scientific classification
- Kingdom: Animalia
- Phylum: Arthropoda
- Class: Insecta
- Order: Diptera
- Family: Syrphidae
- Tribe: Cerioidini
- Genus: Polybiomyia; Shannon, 1925

= Polybiomyia =

Genus of flies

Polybiomyia is a genus of hoverfly.

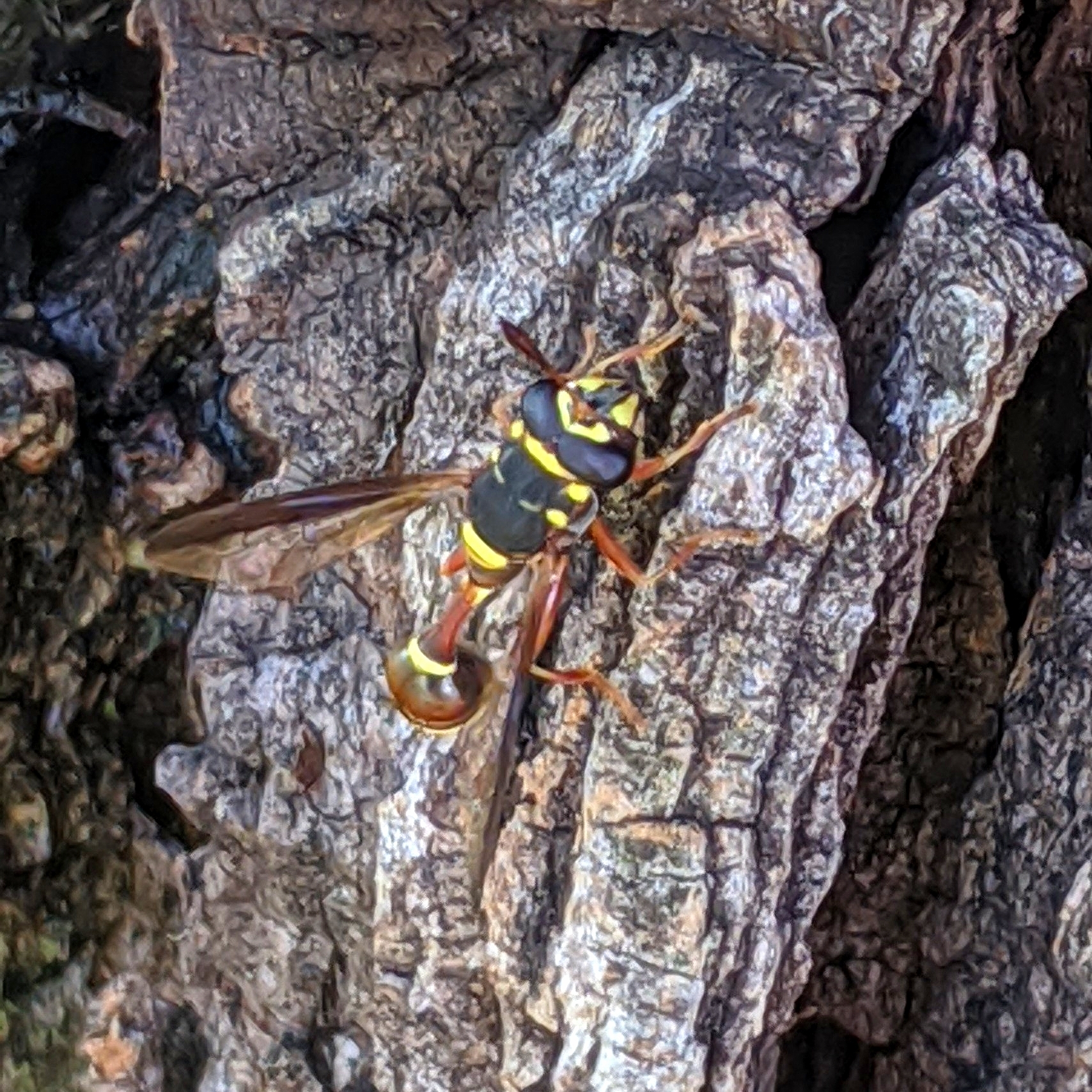
Polybiomyia bellardii

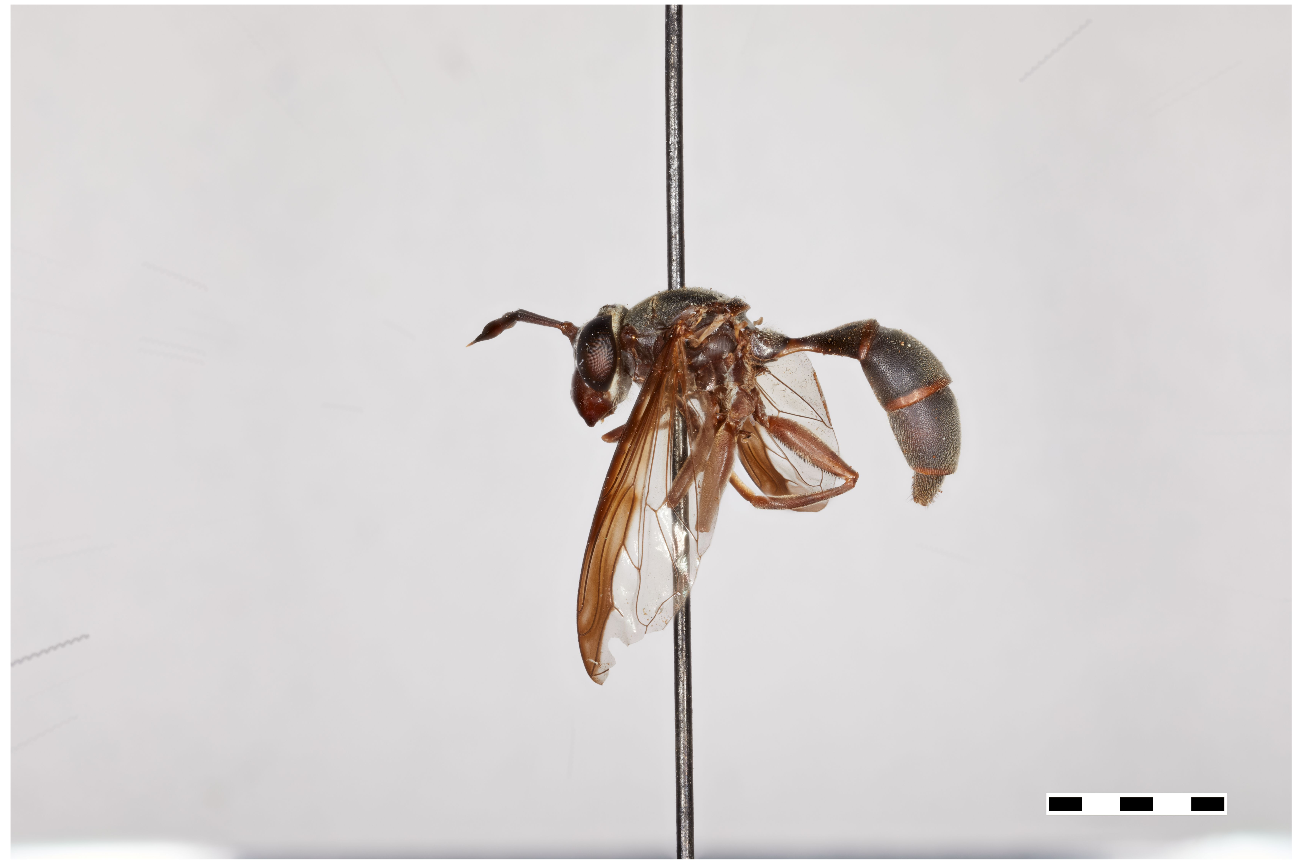
Polybiomyia lyncharribalzagai

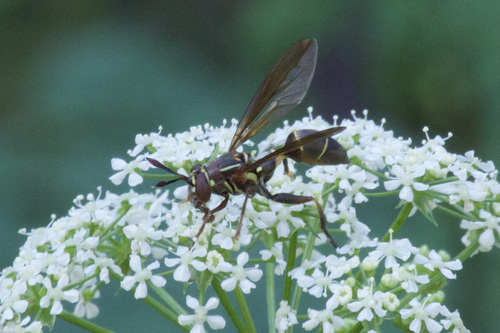
Polybiomyia schnablei

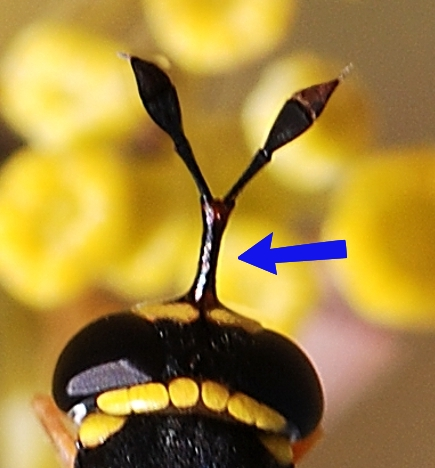
Frontal prominence

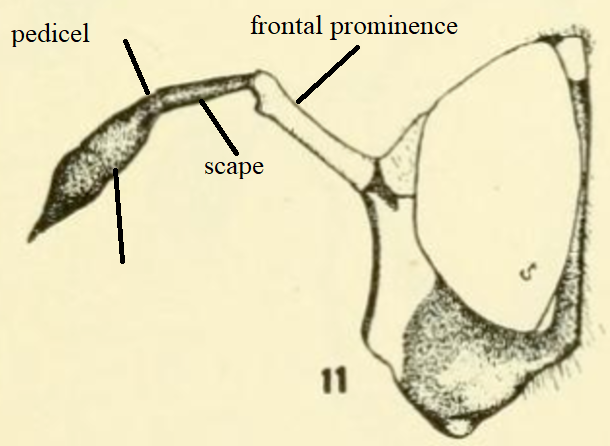
antennae

== Systematics ==
Species include:

- Polybiomyia ablepta (Riek, 1954)
- Polybiomyia arietis (Loew, 1853)
- Polybiomyia bassleri (Curran, 1941)
- Polybiomyia bellardii (Shannon, 1925)
- Polybiomyia bequaerti (Curran, 1938)
- Polybiomyia bolivari (Thompson & Wyatt, 2015)
- Polybiomyia divisa (Walker, 1857)
- Polybiomyia engelhardti (Shannon, 1925)
- Polybiomyia lyncharribalzagai (Shannon, 1927)
- Polybiomyia macquarti (Shannon, 1925)
- Polybiomyia nigra (Bigot, 1884)
- Polybiomyia odontomera (Curran, 1941)
- Polybiomyia pedicellata (Williston, 1887)
- Polybiomyia plaumanni (Curran, 1941)
- Polybiomyia rufibasis (Bigot, 1884)
- Polybiomyia sayi (Shannon, 1925)
- Polybiomyia schnablei (Williston, 1892)
- Polybiomyia schwarzi (Shannon, 1925)
- Polybiomyia signifera (Loew, 1853)
- Polybiomyia townsendi (Snow, 1895)
- Polybiomyia travassosi (Lane & Carrera, 1943)

Genera of Cerioidini
Genus	frontal prominence	abdominal segment 1	abdominal segment two constriction	abdominal segment 2 length	paraface	other
Ceriana	as long as scape	same size as segment 2	not constricted	wider than long	very short paraface	looping in third vein R4+5 with spur branch projecting into cell r4+5
Monoceromyia	as long as scape	wider than segment 2	strongly constricted	longer than wide		loop of vein R4+5 without Spur branch
Polybiomyia	absent or very short	shorter than segment 2	strongly constricted	longer than wide		vein R4+5 not looping
Primocerioides	shorter than scape		not constricted	wider than long	long paraface and large anterior tentorial pit	eyes and face pilose, vein R4+5 straight
Sphiximorpha	shorter than scape	wider than 2	slightly constricted anteriomedially	longer than wide	long paraface and large or deep anterior tentorial pit.	Facial tubercle weak to nearly absent. vein R4+5 not looping.
