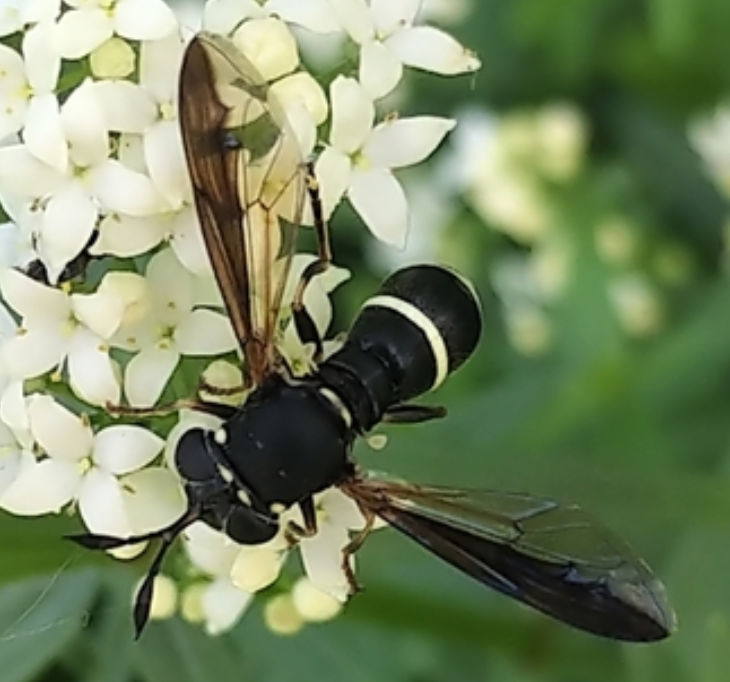

Scientific classification
- Kingdom: Animalia
- Phylum: Arthropoda
- Class: Insecta
- Order: Diptera
- Family: Syrphidae
- Genus: Ceriana
- Species: C. abbreviata

Binomial name
- Ceriana abbreviata Loew, 1864
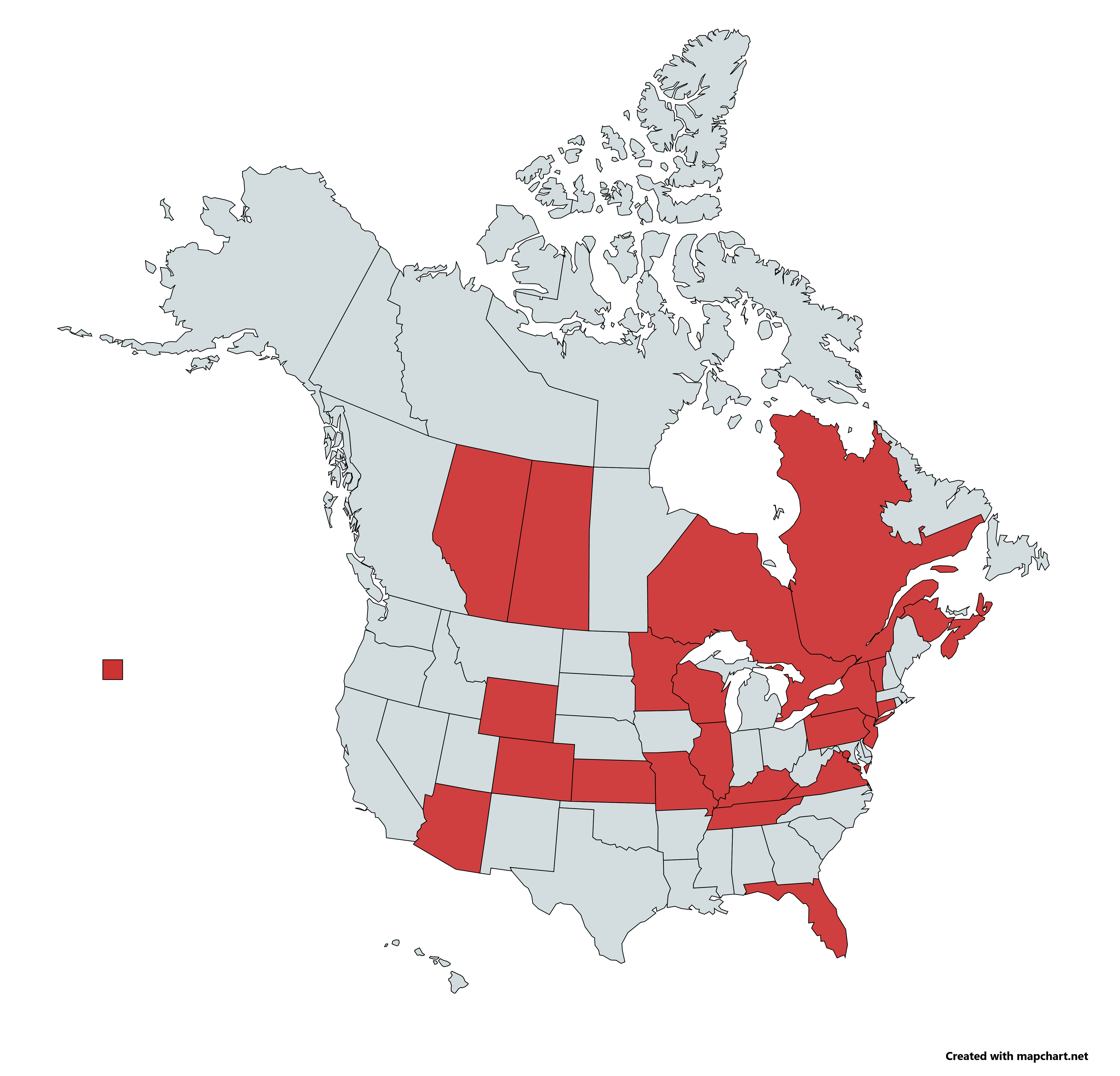
- C. abbrivata range 2023

Synonyms
- Cerioides proxima Curran, 1925

= Ceriana abbreviata =

Species of fly

Ceriana abbreviata (Loew, 1864), the Northern Wasp Fly , is a rare species of syrphid fly observed across North America and Canada (see map). Hoverflies can remain nearly motionless in flight. The adults are also known as flower flies for they are commonly found on flowers, from which they get both energy-giving nectar and protein-rich pollen. The adults are wasp mimics. The larvae feed on the sap of tree wounds.
