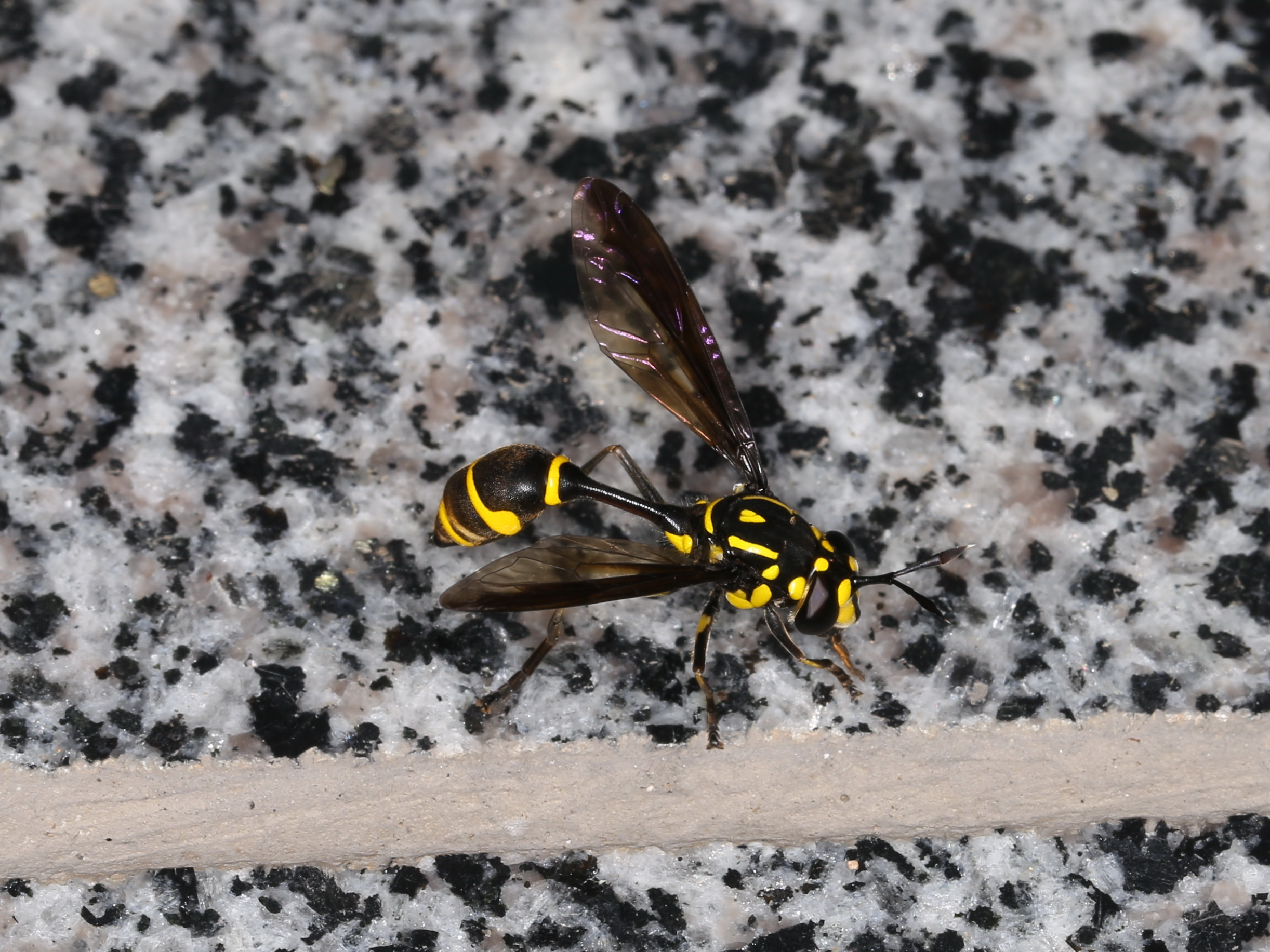
- Monoceromyia trinotata

Scientific classification
- Domain: Eukaryota
- Kingdom: Animalia
- Phylum: Arthropoda
- Class: Insecta
- Order: Diptera
- Family: Syrphidae
- Tribe: Cerioidini
- Genus: Monoceromyia; Shannon, 1925

Type species
- Ceria tricolor Loew, 1861

= Monoceromyia =

Genus of flies

Monoceromyia is a genus of hoverfly. Species in the genus are found in the Afrotropical, Australasian, Neotropical and Oriental regions. They are mimics of wasps and the genus is distinguished by the metapleura being widely separate behind the hind coxae. The elongated frontal base of the antenna is at least as long as the basal segment of the antenna and the second abdominal tergum is longer than wide and constricted.

== Systematics ==
Species include:

- Monoceromyia afra (Wiedemann 1830)
- Monoceromyia ammophilina (Speiser, 1910)
- Monoceromyia annulata (Kertész, 1913)
- Monoceromyia atacta (Riek, 1954)
- Monoceromyia bicolor (Kertesz 1902)
- Monoceromyia brunnecorporalis Yang & Cheng, 1999
- Monoceromyia bubulici
- Monoceromyia cacica (Walker 1860)
- Monoceromyia caffra (Loew, 1853)
- Monoceromyia chusanensis (Ôuchi, 1943)
- Monoceromyia congolensis (Bezzi, 1908)
- Monoceromyia crocata (Cheng, 2012)
- Monoceromyia crux (Brunetti, 1915)
- Monoceromyia daphnaeus (Walker 1849)
- Monoceromyia doddi (Ferguson 1926)
- Monoceromyia euchroma (Riek, 1954)
- Monoceromyia eumenioides (Saunders, 1841)
- Monoceromyia fabricii (Thompson, 1981)
- Monoceromyia fenestrata (Brunetti, 1923)
- Monoceromyia flavipennis (Meijere, 1908)
- Monoceromyia flavoscutata Sankararaman, Anooj and Mengual, 2021
- Monoceromyia floridensis Shannon, 1922
- Monoceromyia frenata (Loew 1853)
- Monoceromyia gambiana (Saunders, 1845)
- Monoceromyia globigaster (Hull, 1944)
- Monoceromyia gloriosa
- Monoceromyia guangxiana Yang & Cheng, 1999
- Monoceromyia hervebazini
- Monoceromyia himalayensis (Meijere, 1908)
- Monoceromyia hopei (Saunders, 1845)
- Monoceromyia javana (Wiedemann, 1824)
- Monoceromyia katoniana (Bezzi, 1921)
- Monoceromyia lateralis (Walker, 1859)
- Monoceromyia lynchii (Williston, 1888)
- Monoceromyia macleayi (Ferguson, 1926)
- Monoceromyia macrosticta
- Monoceromyia maculipennis (Hervé-Bazin, 1913)
- Monoceromyia madecassa
- Monoceromyia mastersi (Ferguson, 1926)
- Monoceromyia melanosoma (Cheng, 2012)
- Monoceromyia metallica (Wulp, 1898)
- Monoceromyia multipunctata (Hull, 1941)
- Monoceromyia neavei (Bezzi, 1915)
- Monoceromyia nigra Sankararaman, Anooj and Mengual, 2021
- Monoceromyia obscura (Brunetti, 1907)
- Monoceromyia patricia (Brunetti, 1923)
- Monoceromyia petersi (Speiser, 1924)
- Monoceromyia pleuralis Coquillett, 1898
- Monoceromyia polistoides (Brunetti, 1923)
- Monoceromyia pulchra (Hervé-Bazin, 1913)
- Monoceromyia relicta (Walker, 1858)
- Monoceromyia rufifrons (Curran, 1927)
- Monoceromyia rufipetiolata (Huo & Ren, 2006)
- Monoceromyia salvazai
- Monoceromyia similis (Kertész, 1913)
- Monoceromyia speiseri (Hervé-Bazin, 1913)
- Monoceromyia stackelbergi
- Monoceromyia stenogaster
- Monoceromyia subarmata (Curran 1926)
- Monoceromyia superba
- Monoceromyia swierstrai (Doesburg, 1955)
- Monoceromyia tienmushanensis (Ôuchi, 1943)
- Monoceromyia tolmera (Riek, 1954)
- Monoceromyia tredecimpunctata (Brunetti, 1923)
- Monoceromyia tricolor (Loew, 1861)
- Monoceromyia trinotata (de Meijere, 1904)
- Monoceromyia ugandana (Kertész, 1913)
- Monoceromyia unipunctata (Doesburg, 1956)
- Monoceromyia varipes (Curran, 1927)
- Monoceromyia verralli (Williston, 1892)
- Monoceromyia vittipes (Curran, 1941)
- Monoceromyia wallacei Shannon, 1927
- Monoceromyia weemsi (Thompson, 1981)
- Monoceromyia wiedemanni Shannon, 1927
- Monoceromyia wui
- Monoceromyia yentaushanensis (Ôuchi, 1943)
