= Primocerioides =

Scientific classification
- Kingdom: Animalia
- Phylum: Arthropoda
- Class: Insecta
- Order: Diptera
- Family: Syrphidae
- Tribe: Cerioidini
- Genus: Primocerioides; Shannon 1927

Genus of flies

Primocerioides is a genus of hoverfly.

== Systematics ==
Species include:

- Primocerioides beijingensis Yang & Cheng, 1999
- Primocerioides petri Hervé-Bazin, 1914
- Primocerioides regale Violovitsh, 1985
