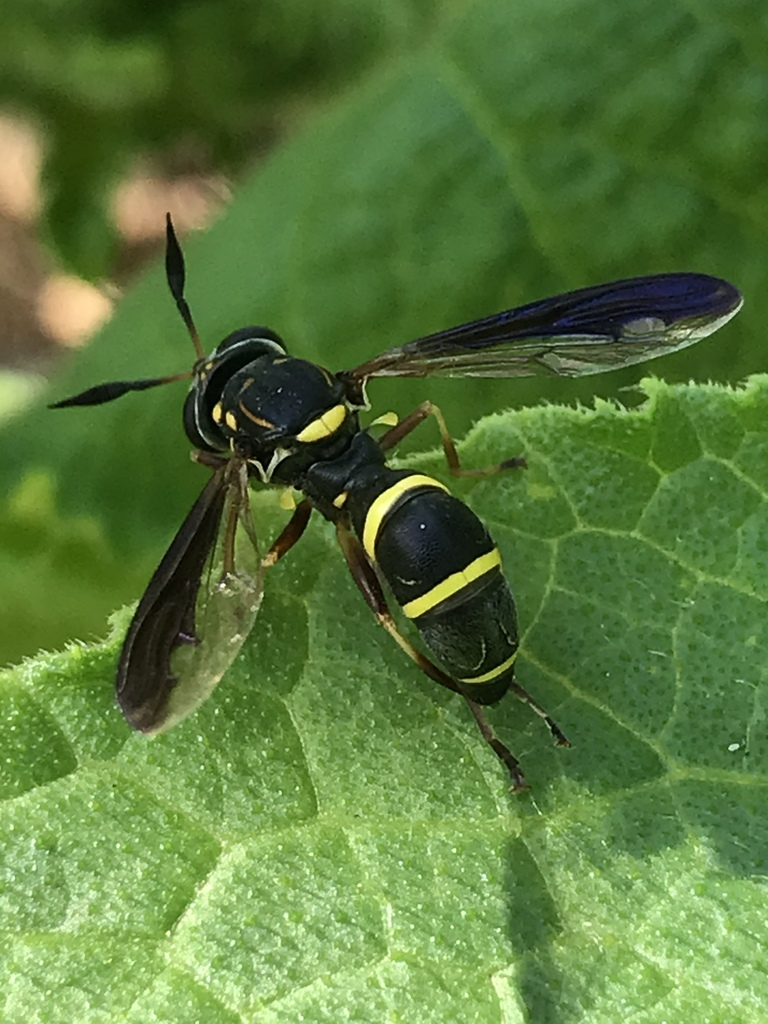

Scientific classification
- Kingdom: Animalia
- Phylum: Arthropoda
- Class: Insecta
- Order: Diptera
- Family: Syrphidae
- Genus: Sphiximorpha
- Species: S. willistoni

Binomial name
- Sphiximorpha willistoni (Kahl, 1897)
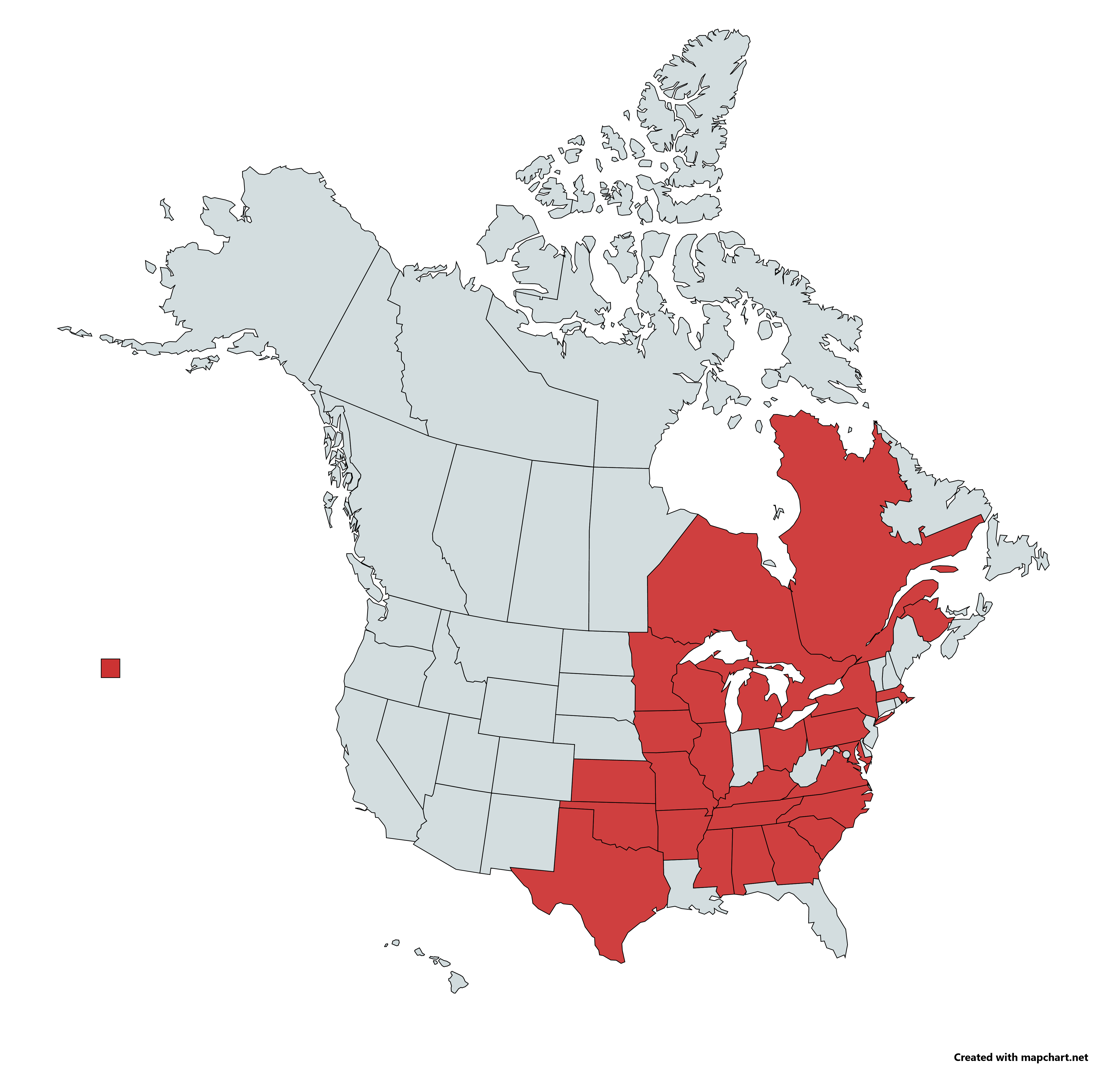
- Sphiximorpha willistoni distribution

Synonyms
- Ceria willistoni Kahl, 1897

= Sphiximorpha willistoni =

Species of insect

Sphiximorpha willistoni (Kahl, 1897), or Williston's wasp fly, is a rare species of syrphid fly found in eastern North America (see map). It is a strong wasp mimic. Hoverflies can remain nearly motionless in flight. The adults are also known as flower flies for they are commonly found on flowers, from which they get both energy-giving nectar and protein-rich pollen. Larvae in this genus are found in sap runs of trees.

== Description ==
Size

Between 11–14 mm (0.43–0.55 in).

In overall appearance this species mimics a wasp with the darkened forewing, elongate antennae, black and yellow markings on the thorax and banded yellow markings on a thin-wasted abdomen.

Head

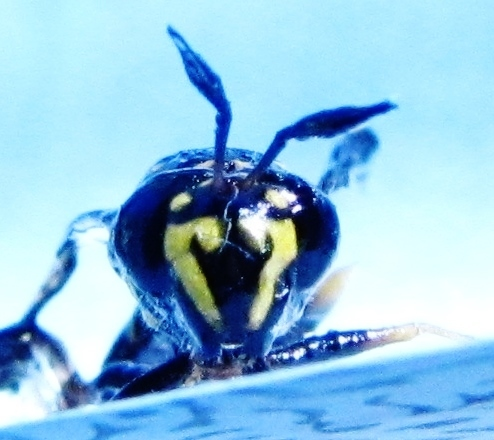
S.willistoni head

The face is long, flat, black with varying yellow marks.It is yellow in the middle with a large black arrowhead shaped spot and the broadly rounded apex rests on the oral margin and its base and is narrowly connected with the broad black field below the antennae. This black field extends transversely to the orbit of the eye, separating the yellow of the face and from a small yellow somewhat triangular spot situated at the orbit of the eye and opposite the base of antennae. From the antennal process to the middle of the arrowhead shaped spot there is a yellowish line, very narrow above, widening below. Some have either a few yellow spots or a transverse stripe below antenna base. Above the base either a yellow V-shaped stripe (usually on male), or another series of 4 spots (usually on female). The front is black, broadly connected with the black below the antennae. A little below the middle are two small, narrowly separated, reddish brown, transverse spots. The opaque portion of the front is thinly white pollinose, and can be seen only in certain lights, most conspicuously at the orbit of the eye. The gena is broadly black with an abbreviated yellow stripe from the inferior orbit of the eye. The eyes of male are touching at top before ocelli while the female eyes are wide apart. The ocelli are reddish-brown, raised above top of head with two, nearly touching spots of yellow behind the ocelli. Another faint, hard to see, brownish-yellow spot is at the bottom of eye. The antenna are very long, black with a brownish-yellow base. The scape is slender with the basal two-thirds reddish brown and scarcely longer than the flagellum. The pedicel is black and half as long as the scape. The flagellum is wider with tips sharply pointed. The antennifer, the base for the antennae, is very little projecting above and wholly obsolete below and brownish yellow. Behind the ocelli are two yellow dots placed in a transverse line. The vertex is reddish brown with the sides of front below thinly provided with yellowish pile. The occiput is black, thinly white pilose and white pollinose, the latter conspicuous only along the orbit of the eye.

Thorax

The scutum is black with inconspicuous, very minute, brownish pubescence on mesonotum. There is an oblique, oval spot on presutural callus. An elongated spot is on the mesopleurae along the mesopleural suture. Below it is an oval oblique yellowish spot along the posterior end of the sterno-pleural suture. The scutellum is reddish brown, towards the sides it is yellowish brown with the extreme base and lateral angles black and the posterior margin narrowly brown. The thorax sides have oblong longitudinal yellow spot on posterior anepisternum directed downward, and another smaller, oblong yellow spot directed sideways below it just above the coxa of midlegs. A wide, curved light yellow mark is below scutellum. Each side of mesonotum is reddish brown, from above seen as an outwardly arched stripe, beginning a little in front of the scutellar ridge and extending to the transverse suture. Along the middle of mesonotum, in front, are two parallel, narrow, yellowish pollinose stripes, not quite reaching the anterior border, but each one terminating in a transverse, yellowish pollinose spot on the transverse suture, behind which the stripes are faintly visible. The black ground color is concealed by the pollen of those stripes. The sternum is very thinly whitish pollinose. Note: small spots behind the ocelli may seem like two yellow spots on base of thorax, depending on angle of head.

Abdomen

The abdomen is black, much contracted at the base of the second segment, provided with short, appressed yellowish pubescence and yellow, stripes that are slightly raised. The ventral segments are black, posteriorly margined with pale yellow on the second, third and fourth segments, very narrowly on the fourth and broadest on the second that are thinly covered with whitish pubescence. Abdominal segment one is very short and wide with no marks. There is long yellow pubescence of the sides of the segment Abdominal segment two is long and narrow, much contracted at base and about as long as the third segment. There are yellow mark anteriorly on each side and the posterior margin has a yellow band of equal width throughout reaching the lateral margin. The band of the second segment is a little broader than the others. Segment three is short with a yellow band on the posterior margin of equal width throughout and also reaching the lateral margin. There is also a faint U-shaped, or curved yellowish pollinose line on each side of centre, nearer lower margin. Both its ends diverging and do not reach segment two. Segment four is: longer with a yellow stripe on its lower margin. It also has a larger U-shaped yellowish pollinose line on each side of centre, extending almost entire length of segment. On the posterior margin of the fourth segment is a narrow yellow band with its anterior outline convex and not reaching the lateral margin on each side. Segment five is: wholly black, not at all pollinose and the sparse pubescence is mixed yellowish and blackish.

Wings

The anterior half of the wings are brown while the posterior is hyaline. The brown is limited posteriorly by the fourth vein at base, and by the spurious vein to barely beyond the anterior cross vein. The brown also extends to the R4+5 vein, narrowly bordering it posteriorly a short distance before the stump of the vein, which it follows exteriorly, thereafter rather broadly bordering the third vein posteriorly with its outline diverging from that vein. The extreme margin of the wing immediately beyond the apex of the third vein is, however, greyish hyaline, not brown. At base of the wing the color is yellowish and the cells in the brown field are somewhat lighter along their middle. The veins are dark brown, at the base of the wing and the portion of the fifth vein between second basal and anal cells yellowish brown. The last section of the third vein forms before its middle a very slight angle, from which a short vein projects into the first posterior cell. The halteres and tegulae are yellowish.

Legs

The femora are black, faint yellow at joints with the hind side of middle femora fringed with whitish hairs . The hind femora are long and slightly thickened. The distal half of the femora have two rows of minute black spines beneath, most conspicuous on the hind femora, least on the front ones. The tibiae are yellowish-brown basally with the rest black. The last tarsi are yellow with the rest black, except hind tarsi are entirely black. All the trochanters are yellow. The coxae are black with brownish at the tip.

Wing of Tribe Ceriodini

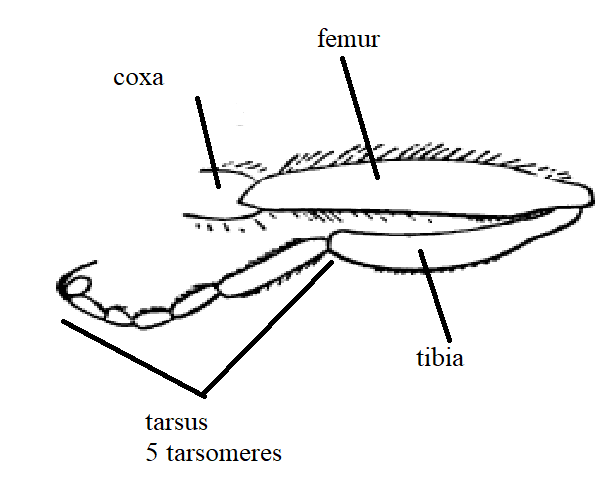
leg diagram

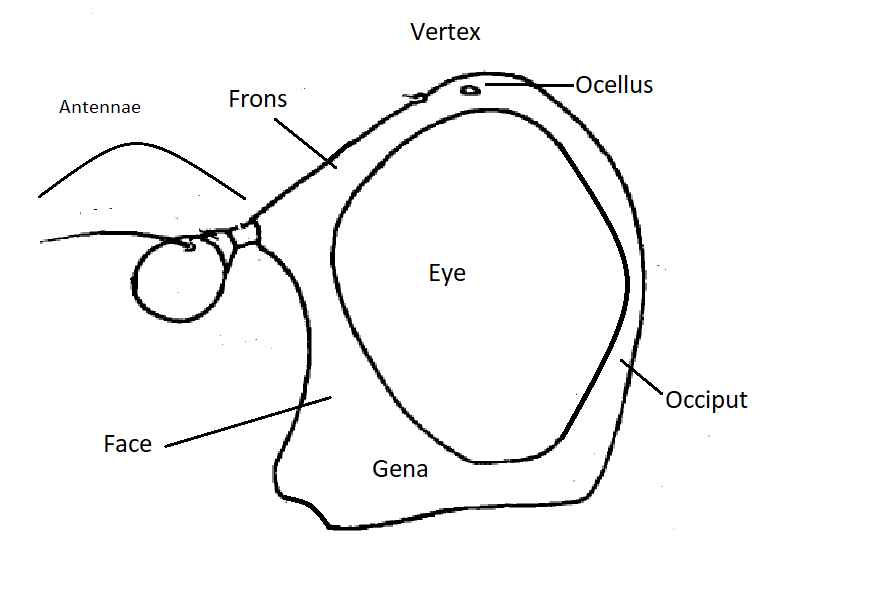
profile syrphid head general

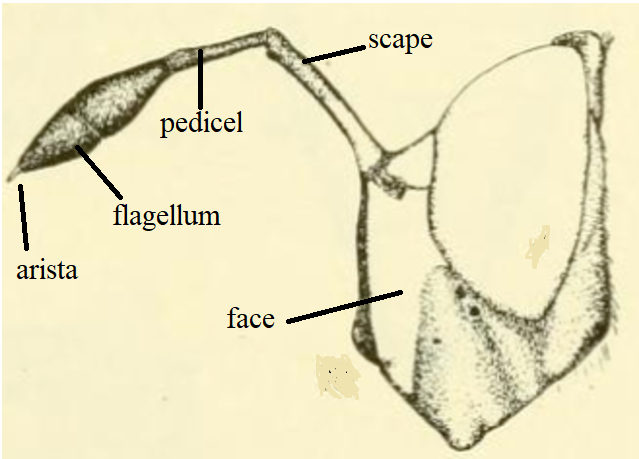
Sphiximorph type antennae

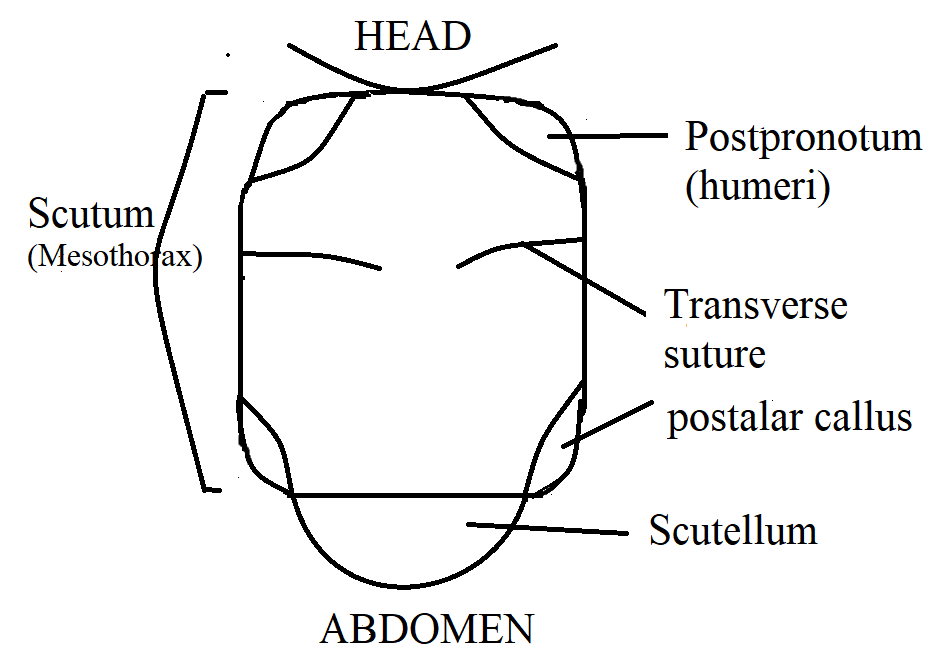
dorsal view of Syrphid thorax
