= Monoceromyia pleuralis =

Scientific classification
- Kingdom: Animalia
- Phylum: Arthropoda
- Clade: Pancrustacea
- Class: Insecta
- Order: Diptera
- Family: Syrphidae
- Genus: Monoceromyia
- Species: M. pleuralis

Binomial name
- Monoceromyia pleuralis Coquillett, 1898

Species of fly

Monoceromyia pleuralis is a hoverfly that occurs in Japan. It is mostly black with yellow markings and brown markings on its wings. It was originally described by Coquillett in 1898 as Sphiximorpha pleuralis, but that genus was later lumped into Monoceromyia by Shannon.
