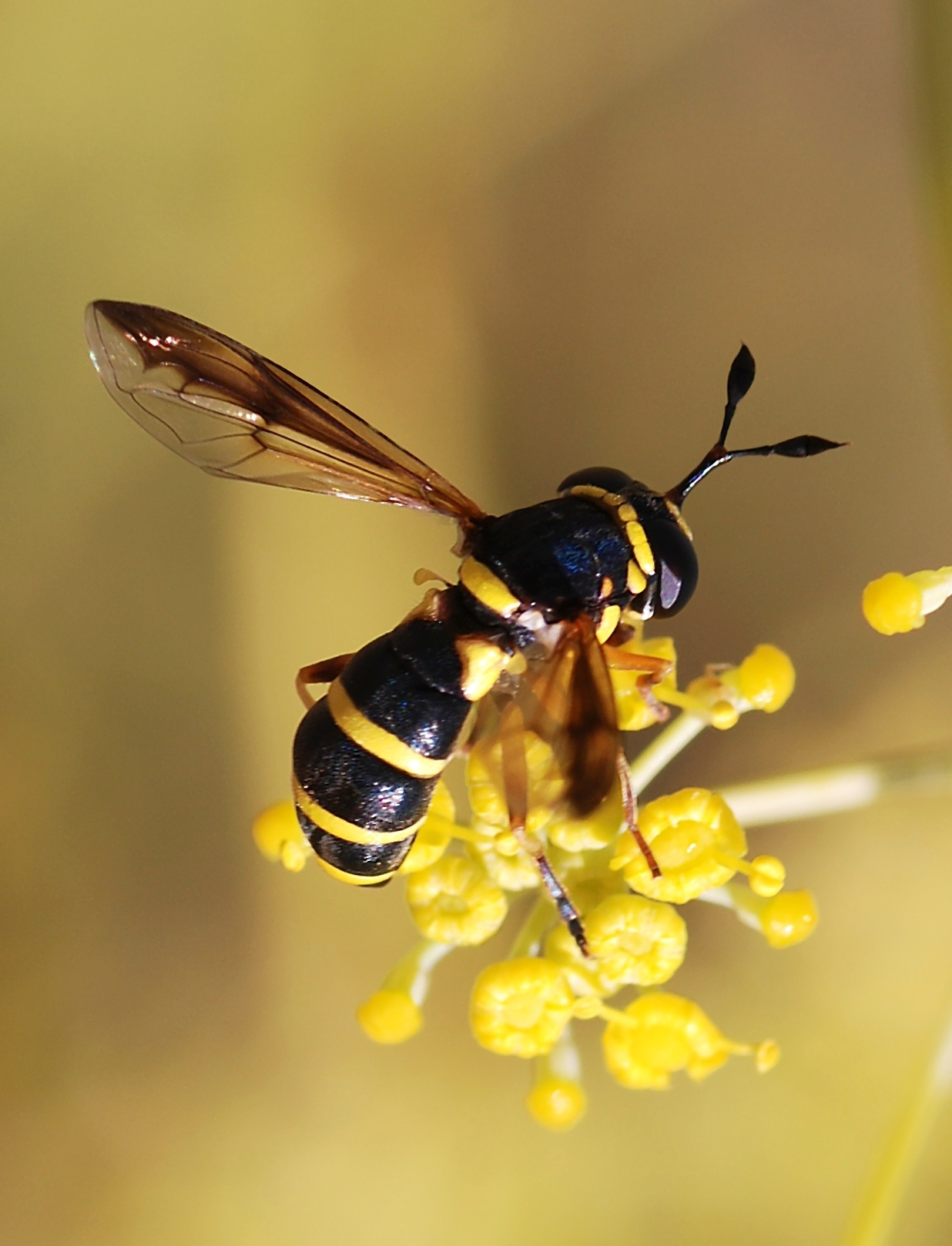

Scientific classification
- Kingdom: Animalia
- Phylum: Arthropoda
- Class: Insecta
- Order: Diptera
- Family: Syrphidae
- Genus: Ceriana
- Species: C. vespiformis

Binomial name
- Ceriana vespiformis (Latreille, 1804)

Synonyms
- Ceria vespiformis Latreille, 1804

= Ceriana vespiformis =

Species of fly

Ceriana vespiformis is a species of hoverfly. It is a typical wasp mimic, is 10–11 mm long, and has very long antennae for a hoverfly.

== Biology ==
Ceriana vespiformis has been reported in mature oak forest and from Mediterranean scrub, where adults visit flowers to feed on nectar. Larvae are found in white mulberry (Morus alba) sap. Adult are seen in Southern Europe from late May to September.

== Distribution ==
This species' range is mainly Mediterranean (Southern Europe and North Africa). Specimens have been found in Spain, Portugal, France, Italy, Albania, Croatia, Greece, Romania, Turkey, Lebanon, Israel and parts of North Africa. Two specimens have been found in the Netherlands.
