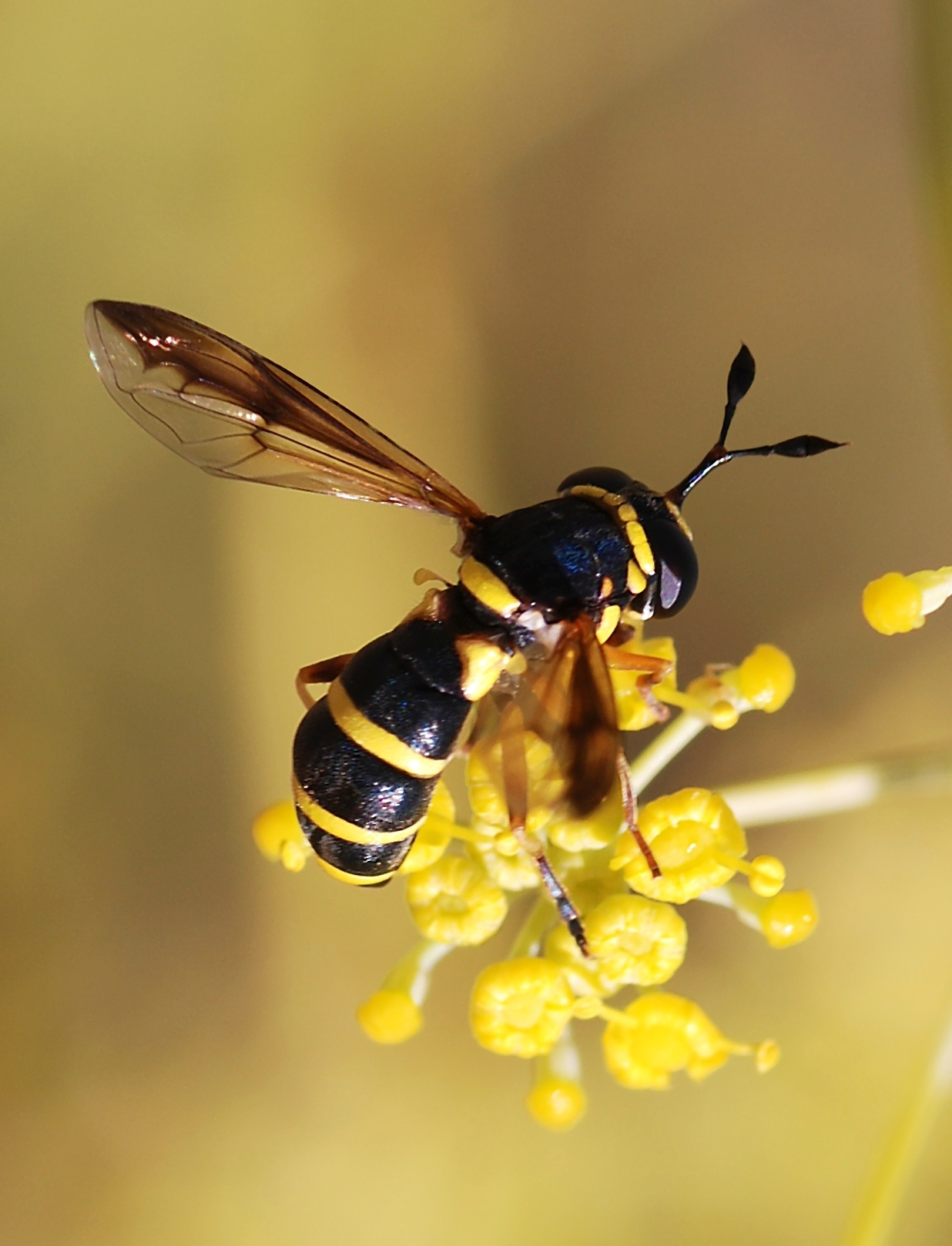
- Ceriana vespiformes

Scientific classification
- Kingdom: Animalia
- Phylum: Arthropoda
- Class: Insecta
- Order: Diptera
- Family: Syrphidae
- Subfamily: Eristalinae
- Tribe: Cerioidini; Wahlgren, 1909

Genera
- Ceriana Rafinesque, 1815; Monoceromyia Shannon, 1925; Polybiomyia Shannon, 1925; Primocerioides; Sphiximorpha Rondani 1850

= Cerioidini =

Tribe of hoverflies

Cerioidini is a widespread tribe of around 222 species of hoverfly. Cerioidini are mistaken for wasps for which they are effective mimics. Cerioidini have antennae with a terminal style and have somewhat elongate and basally constricted abdomens, only slightly in Ceriana, but pronounced in most Sphiximorpha; and Polybiomyia, and extremely in Monoceromyia. Larvae live mostly within tree sap associated with tree wounds or putrefying pockets of water in tree cavities.

== Description ==
This family is distinguished by anatomy and coloration that has evolved to be wasp mimics. The antennae are long and thin with a terminal arista (see gallery) suggestive of wasp antennae that are also long. The arista of the antennae is terminal. The elongate antennae has arisen independently in other genera such as Mocrodon although in that genera the arista is not terminal. The flagellum is always elongate while the scape and pedicel are elongated in different ratios that are helpful in distinguishing the various genera. an elongation of the front, the frontal prominence adds to the elongation of the antennae but is reduced or inconspicuous in some genera (see table below)The face is elongated with coloring that sometimes has the appearance of the wasp mandibles. These flies have no mandibles. The abdomen is elongated often constricted in the first and/or second segments (see table below). The anterior half of the wing is commonly darkly colored while the posterior half is usually clear. The effect is the appearance of a dark forewing and a clear hind wing, as in wasps. When captured, the fly also has some behavioural mimicry, such as a stinging motion of the abdomen. These flies have no actual stinger. The overall coloration is very wasp-like, often black with yellow rings on the abdomen and strong markings on the thorax and face. Wing venation characteristics are of taxonomic value. The cross-vein r-m is at or beyond the middle of the discal cell. Cells r_{1} and r_{2+3} are open, while cell r_{4+5} is closed near the margin of the wing. Vein R_{4+5} can be straight, looping with or without a spur vein.

== Gallery ==
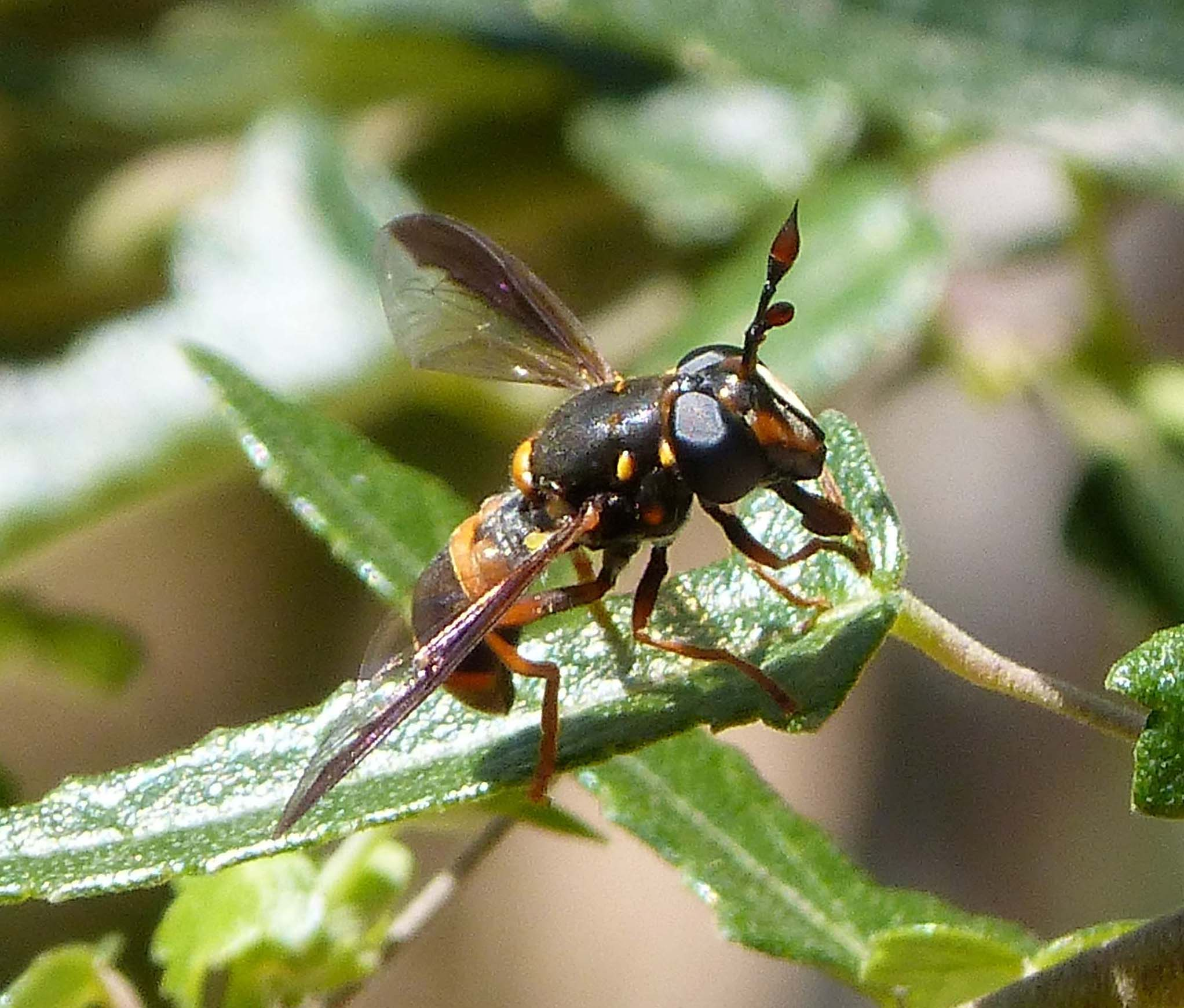
Wasp-mimic Ceriana ornata_

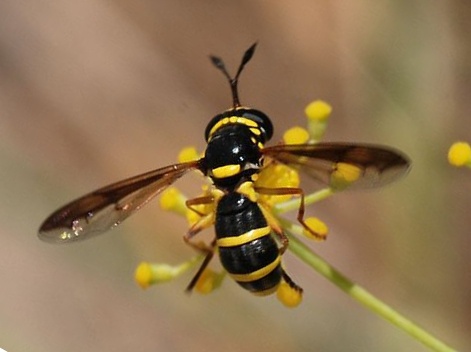
Ceriana alvesgaspar

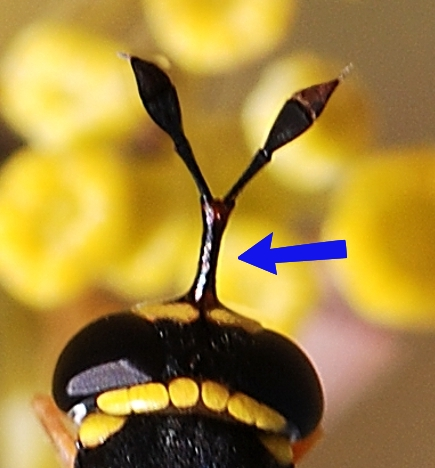
Frontal prominence of Ceriana

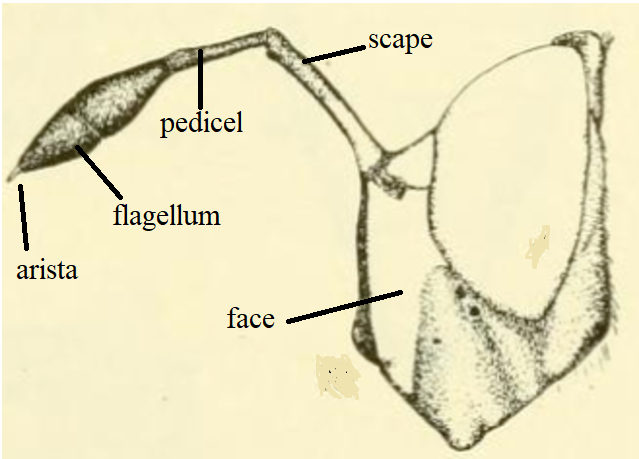
Cerioidini antennae diagram

wing veination

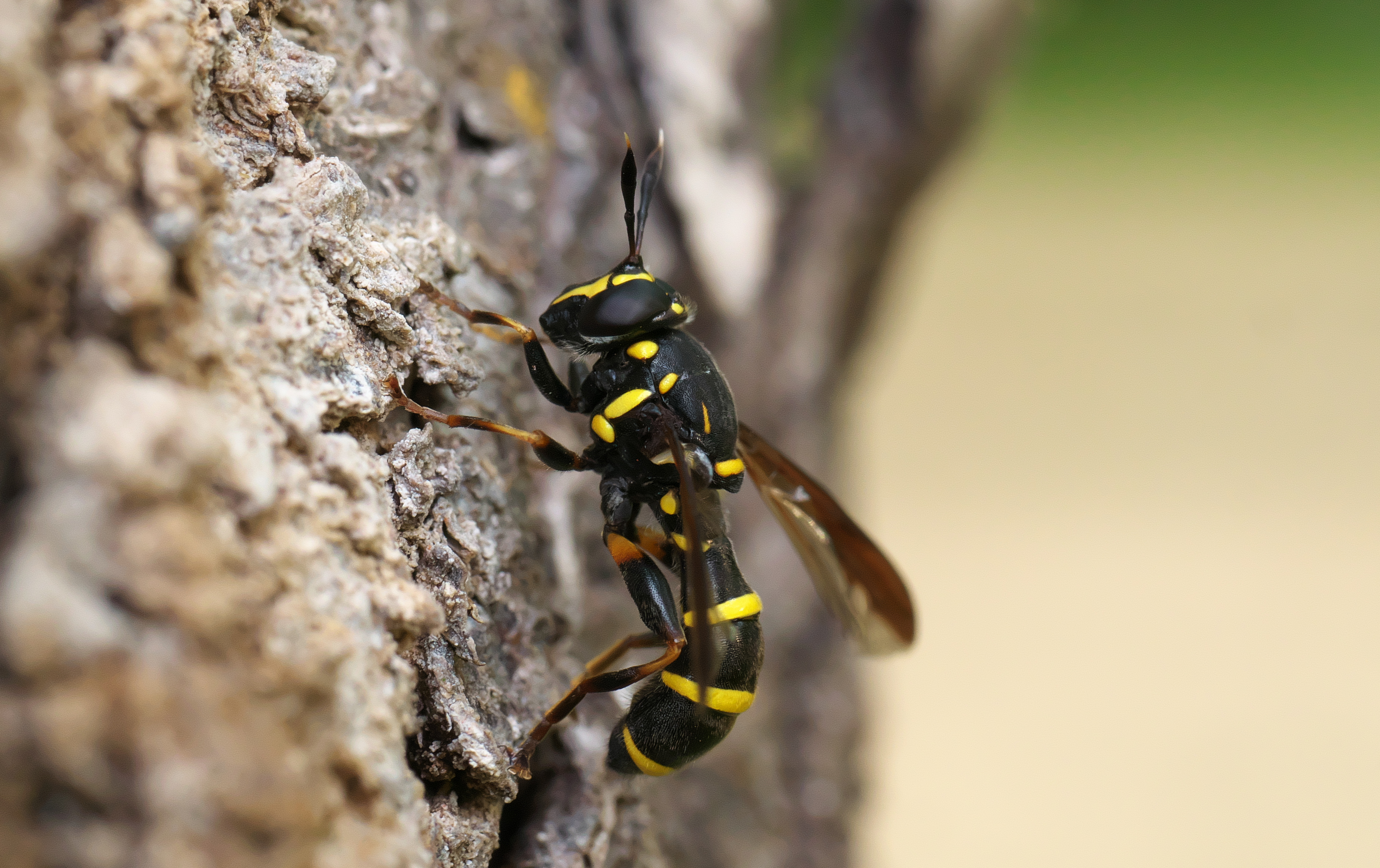
Sphiximorpha subsessilis

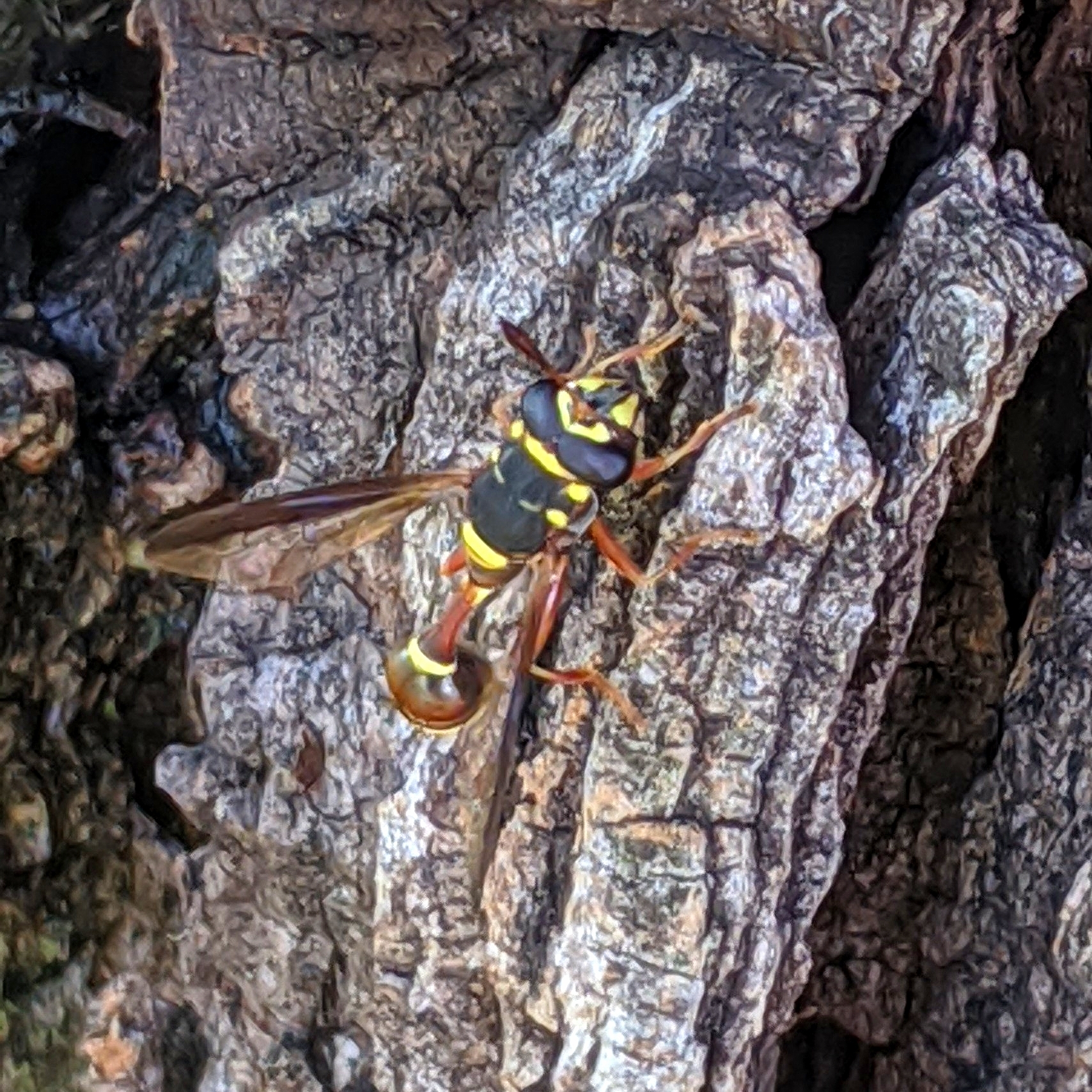
Polybiomyia_bellardii

== Genera characteristics ==
Genera of Cerioidini
Genus	frontal prominence	abdominal segment 1	abdominal segment two constriction	abdominal segment 2 length	paraface	other
Ceriana	as long as scape	same size as segment 2	not constricted	wider than long	very short paraface	looping in third vein R4+5 with spur branch projecting into cell r4+5
Monoceromyia	as long as scape	wider than segment 2	strongly constricted	longer than wide		loop of vein R4+5 without Spur branch
Polybiomyia	absent or very short	shorter than segment 2	strongly constricted	longer than wide		vein R4+5 not looping
Primocerioides	shorter than scape		not constricted	wider than long	long paraface and large anterior tentorial pit	eyes and face pilose, vein R4+5 straight
Sphiximorpha	shorter than scape	wider than 2	slightly constricted anteriomedially	longer than wide	long paraface and large or deep anterior tentorial pit.	Facial tubercle weak to nearly absent. vein R4+5 not looping.
