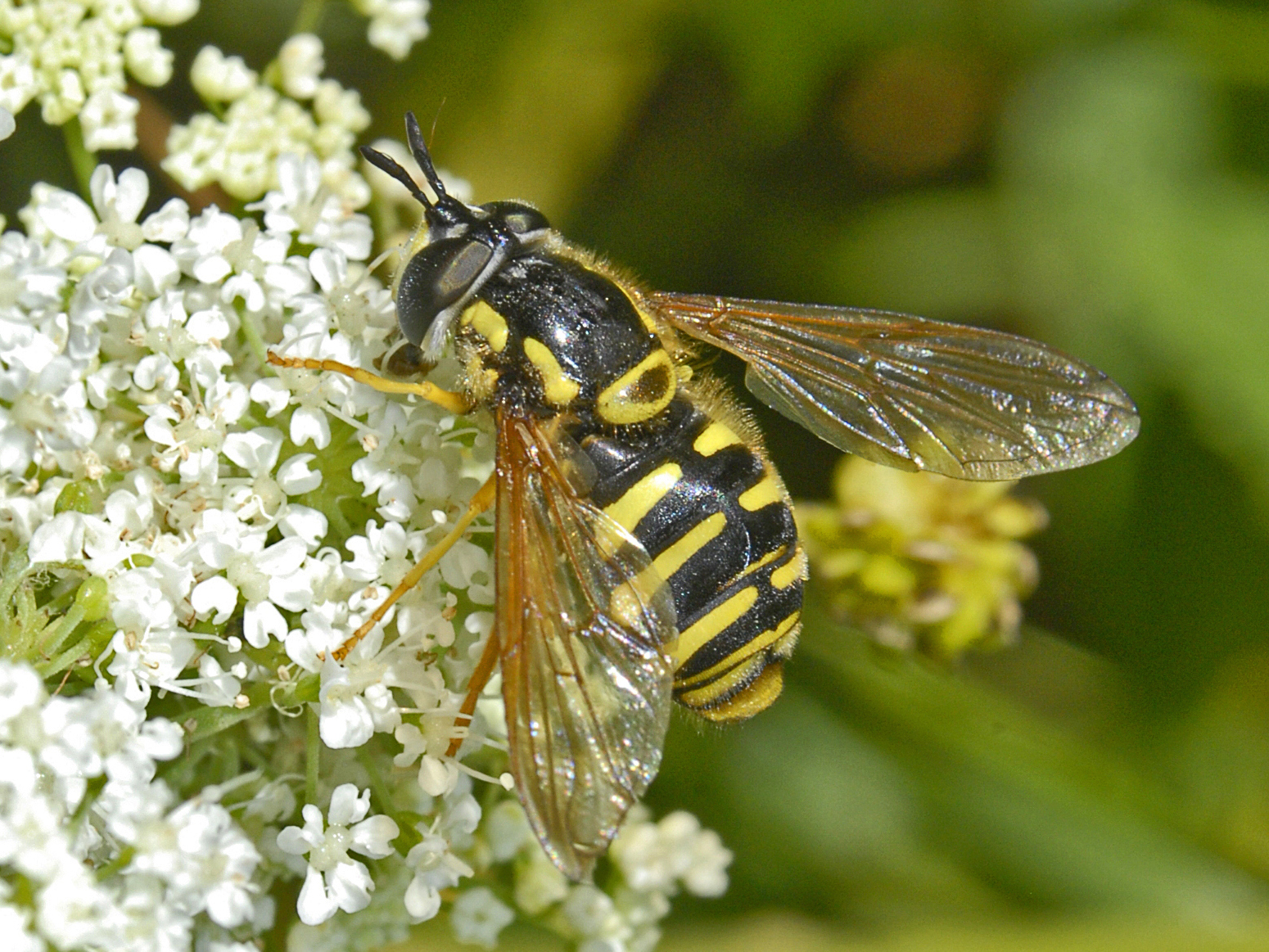
- Female of Chrysotoxum verralli

Scientific classification
- Kingdom: Animalia
- Phylum: Arthropoda
- Class: Insecta
- Order: Diptera
- Family: Syrphidae
- Genus: Chrysotoxum
- Species: C. verralli

Binomial name
- Chrysotoxum verralli Collin, 1940

= Chrysotoxum verralli =

Species of fly

Chrysotoxum verralli is a species of hoverfly belonging to the subfamily Syrphinae.

== Distribution ==
This species is present in Europe, the eastern Palearctic realm, and the Near East.

== Habitat ==
These flies live in grasslands, often close to trees.

== Description ==
Chrysotoxum verralli can reach a length of about 8.5–10.5 millimetres (0.33–0.41 in). These species is a wasp-mimic, with yellow and black bands and long antennae. These bands are substantially parallel to the front edge of tergites. The black front edge of the tergite 2 is almost straight. The third antennal segment is shorter than segments 1 and 2 together. The female’s eyes are separated from each other.

This species is hard to distinguish and very similar to Chrysotoxum arcuatum, Chrysotoxum cautum, Chrysotoxum elegans and Chrysotoxum octomaculatum.

== Etymology ==
The name honours George Henry Verrall.
