= Chrysotoxum plumeum =

Scientific classification
- Kingdom: Animalia
- Phylum: Arthropoda
- Clade: Pancrustacea
- Class: Insecta
- Order: Diptera
- Family: Syrphidae
- Subfamily: Syrphinae
- Tribe: Syrphini
- Genus: Chrysotoxum
- Species: C. plumeum

Binomial name
- Chrysotoxum plumeum Johnson, 1924

Species of fly

Chrysotoxum plumeum, the broad-banded meadow fly, is a common species of syrphid fly observed throughout North America. Hoverflies can remain nearly motionless in flight. The adults are also known as flower flies for they are commonly found on flowers, from which they get both energy-giving nectar and protein-rich pollen. The larvae may be associated with aphids and ants.

The species name may be a junior synonym of Chrysotoxum derivatum Walker, 1849.
