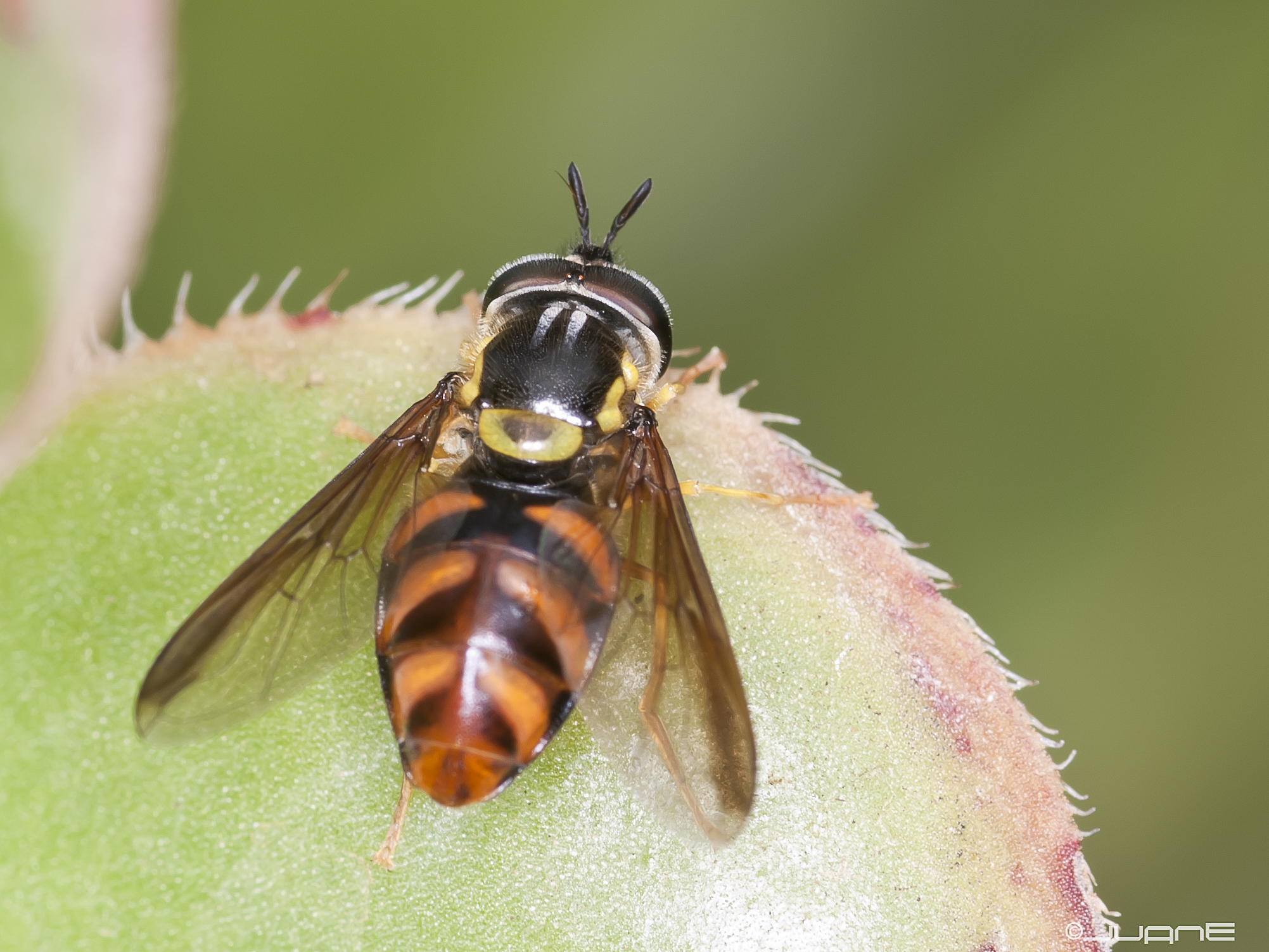

Scientific classification
- Kingdom: Animalia
- Phylum: Arthropoda
- Clade: Pancrustacea
- Class: Insecta
- Order: Diptera
- Family: Syrphidae
- Genus: Chrysotoxum
- Species: C. triarcuatum

Binomial name
- Chrysotoxum triarcuatum Macquart, 1839

Synonyms
- Chrysotoxum canariense Macquart, 1842

= Chrysotoxum triarcuatum =

Species of fly

Chrysotoxum triarcuatum is a species of hoverfly endemic to the Canary Islands.
