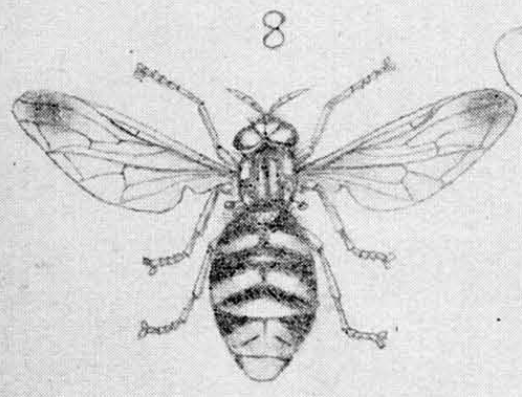
- from original description 1911

Scientific classification
- Kingdom: Animalia
- Phylum: Arthropoda
- Clade: Pancrustacea
- Class: Insecta
- Order: Diptera
- Family: Syrphidae
- Genus: Chrysotoxum
- Species: C. grandis

Binomial name
- Chrysotoxum grandis Matsumura, 1911

= Chrysotoxum grandis =

Species of hoverfly

Chrysotoxum grandis is a hoverfly species found in Japan.

== Description ==
Chrysotoxum grandis n. sp. The head of the insect is yellowish-orange, with a triangular black spot in the middle of the vertex, a frons protuberance with blackish color, and a yellowish-brown median stripe on the lower face. Under the eyes are each a brownish spot. The antennae are dark brown, with the second segment at the tip being yellowish-brown, and the third segment being as long as the previous two segments combined. The thorax is shiny black, with two yellowish-gray longitudinal stripes reaching the middle, two protuberances at the sides, and a yellowish, reddish-yellow and short shoulder blade. The scutellum is yellowish-brown, with the middle and sides somewhat darkened. The wings are hyaline, with a yellowish tint, and a fairly wide brownish-yellow streak at the costal margin, which fades to a brownish color at the tip. The stigma is yellowish, with the tip being slightly brown. The abdomen is reddish-yellow and short-haired, quite high and arched, much wider in the middle than at the base. The second, third, and fourth segments have a yellowish bow-band which gets gradually wider towards the tip, with the third and fourth segments at the rear margin being yellowish. The fifth segment is entirely yellow in the female, and has two black longitudinal lines at the base. The underside of the abdomen is black, and each abdominal segment at the hind margin is yellowish. The fourth sternite has two yellowish spots, and the sixth segment in the male is entirely yellow. The legs are yellow, with the femur being somewhat brownish, and the claws at the tip being black. The length of the insect is between 10 and 18 millimeters. (translated from original)
