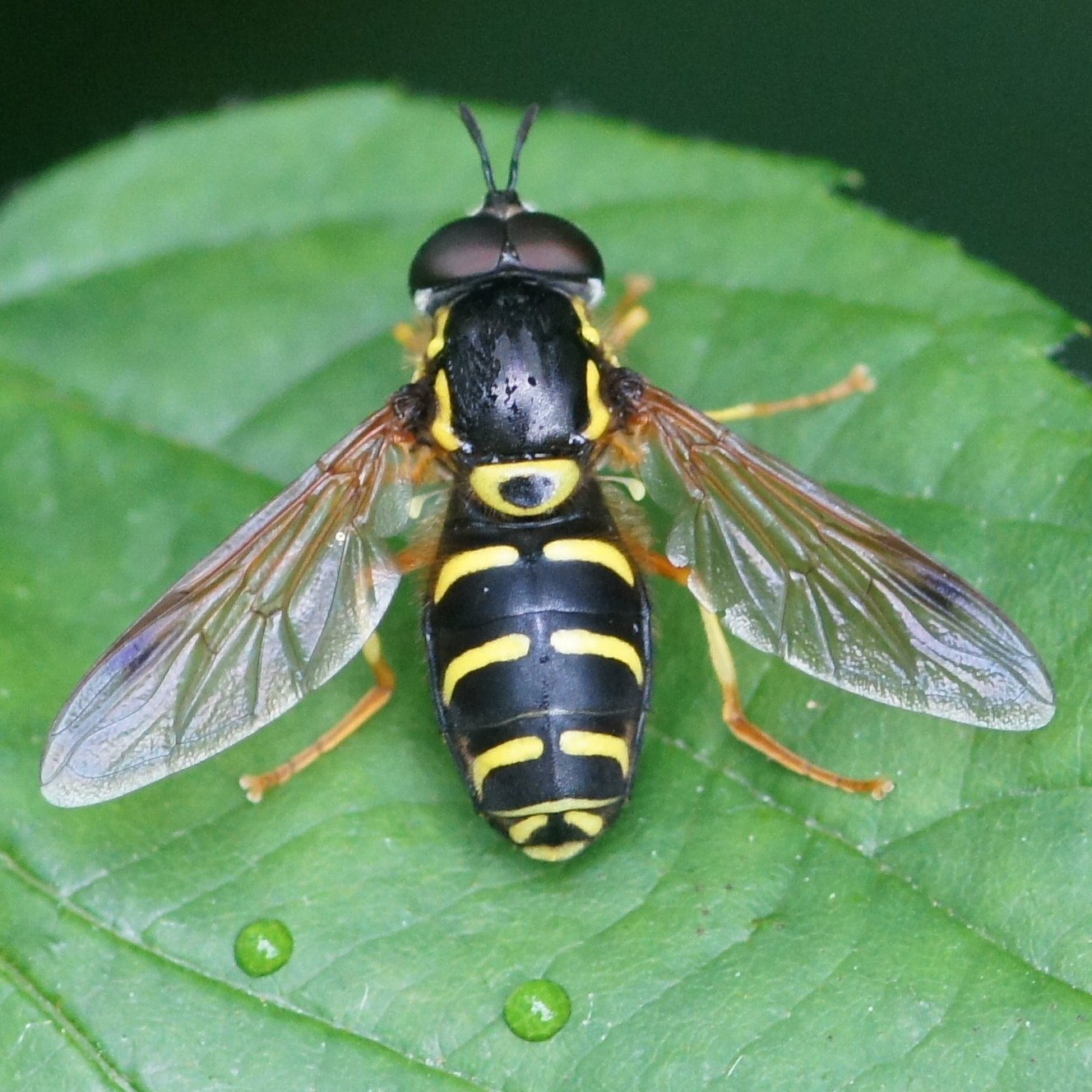
- male
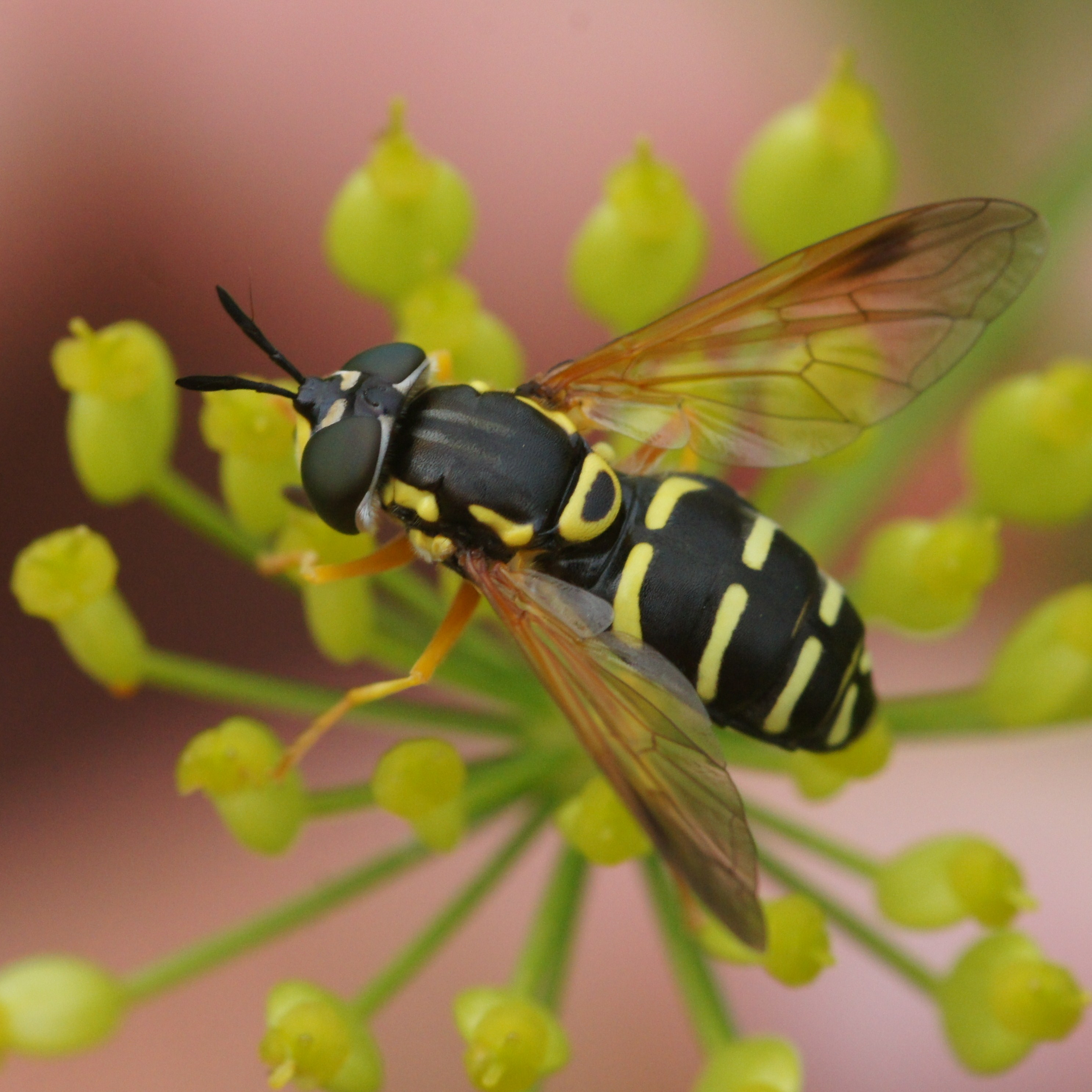
- female

Scientific classification
- Kingdom: Animalia
- Phylum: Arthropoda
- Class: Insecta
- Order: Diptera
- Family: Syrphidae
- Genus: Chrysotoxum
- Species: C. festivum

Binomial name
- Chrysotoxum festivum (Linnaeus, 1758)

Synonyms
- Musca festivum Linnaeus, 1758; Musca imbellis Harris, 1776; Chrysotoxum imbelle Harris, 1776

= Chrysotoxum festivum =

Species of fly

Chrysotoxum festivum is a species of hoverfly.

== Identification ==
External images For terms see Morphology of Diptera
Wing length 8·25–12 mm. Wing with a small, square, dark spot. Thorax with two grey longitudinal stripes. Katepisternum normally with yellow spot. Apical antennomere shorter than antennomeres 1 and 2 together.

Keys and accounts

- Coe R.L. (1953) Syrphidae
- Van Veen, M. (2004) Hoverflies of Northwest Europe
- Van der Goot, V.S. (1981) De zweefvliegen van Noordwest - Europa en Europees Rusland, in het bijzonder van de Benelux
- Bei-Bienko, G.Y. & Steyskal, G.C. (1988) Keys to USSR insects. Diptera

== Distribution ==
Palaearctic Fennoscandia South to Iberia and the Mediterranean basin. Ireland eastwards through Europe into Greece, Turkey and European Russia then through Siberia to the Pacific coast. Japan. North India.

== Biology ==
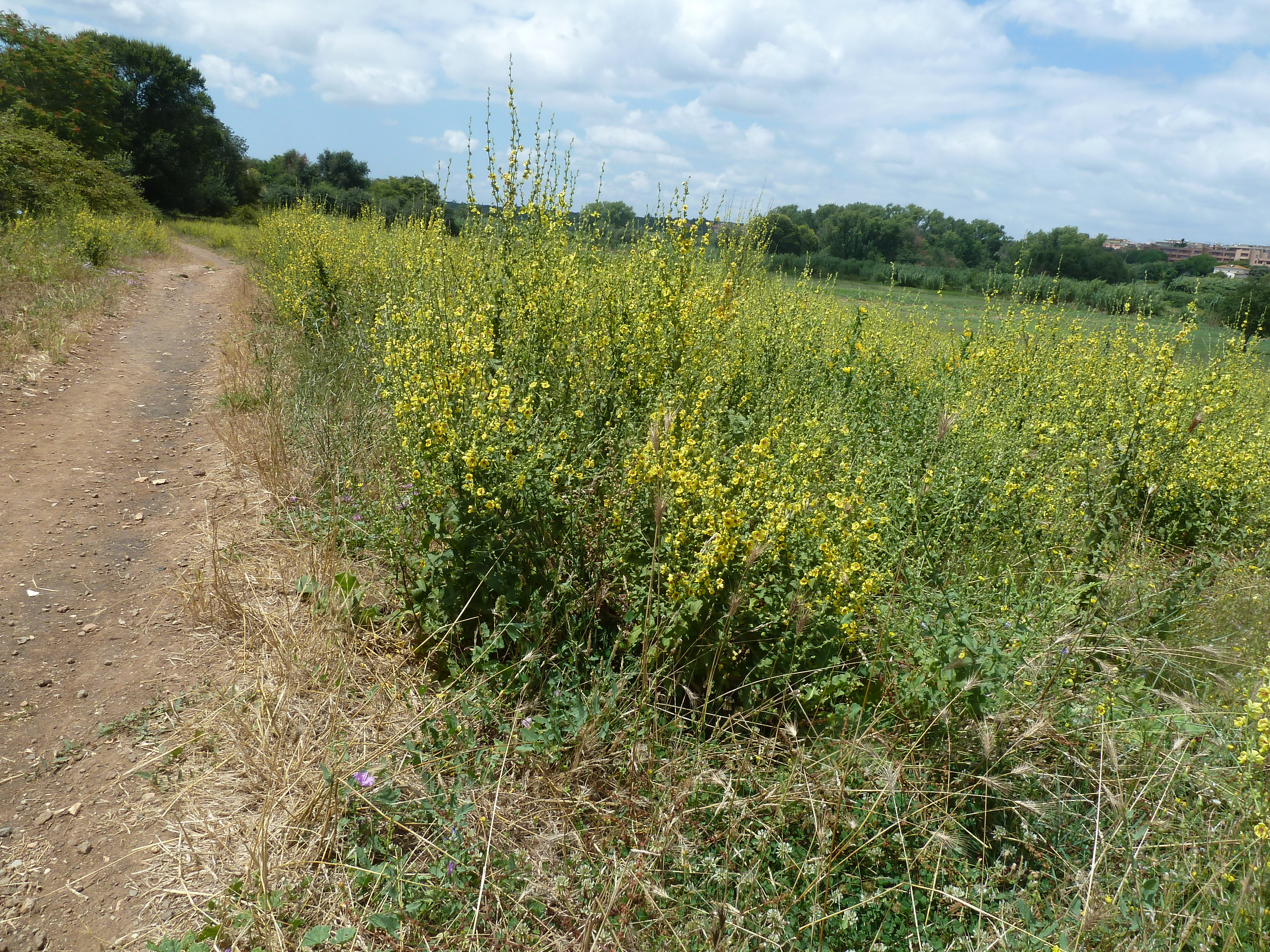
Habitat.Italy

Habitat :Deciduous woodland clearings and open areas in scrub woodland. Grassland with scrub. Flowers visited include white umbellifers, Calluna, Chaerophyllum, Cirsium arvense, Euphorbia, Galium, Hieracium, Hypochoeris, Narthecium, Origanum, Potentilla erecta, Ranunculus, Rosa rugosa, Rubus idaeus, Sambucus nigra, Senecio, Solidago canadensis and Solidago virgaurea.

The flight period is May to September, with peaks in June and August.
