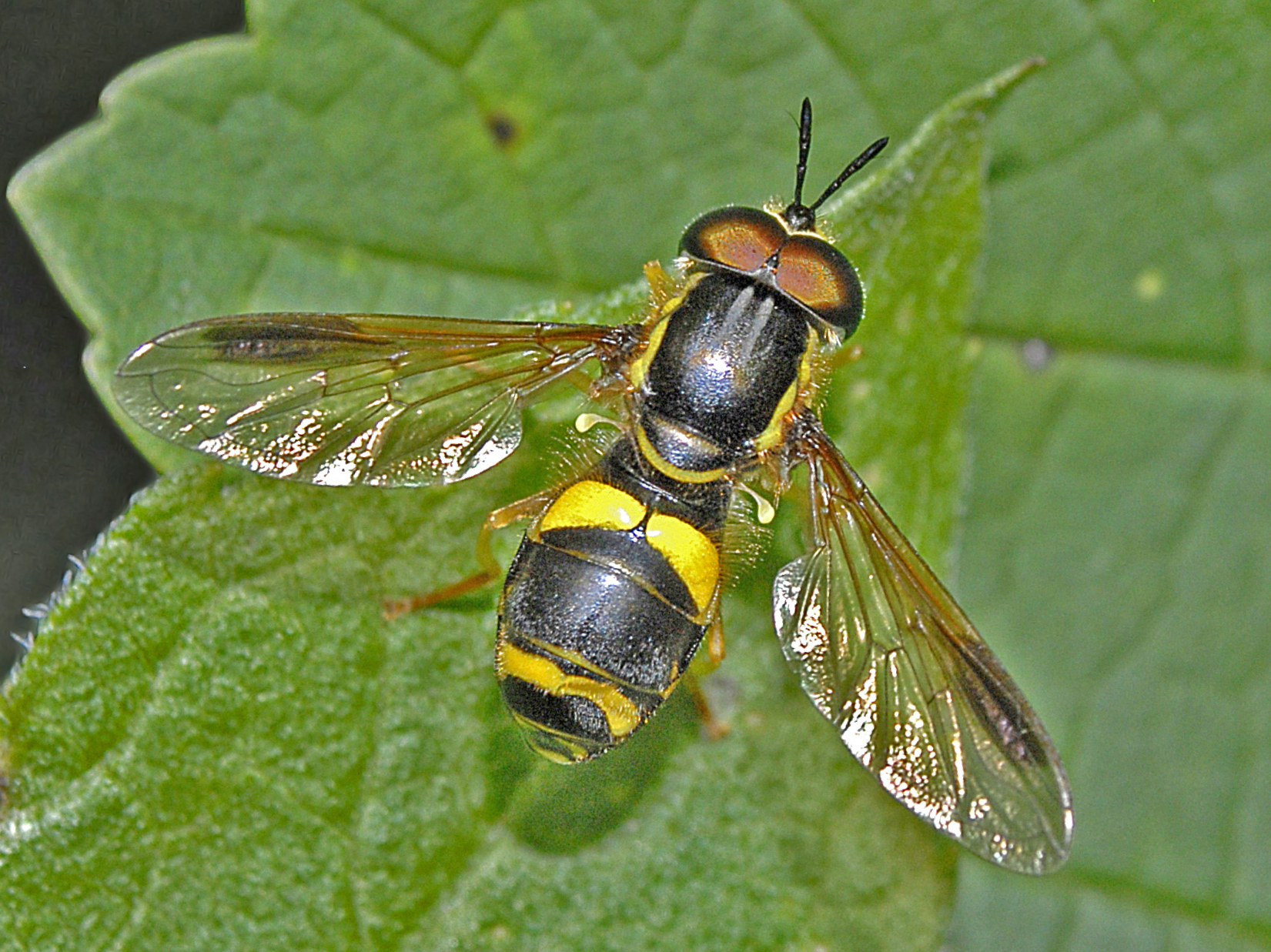
- Male
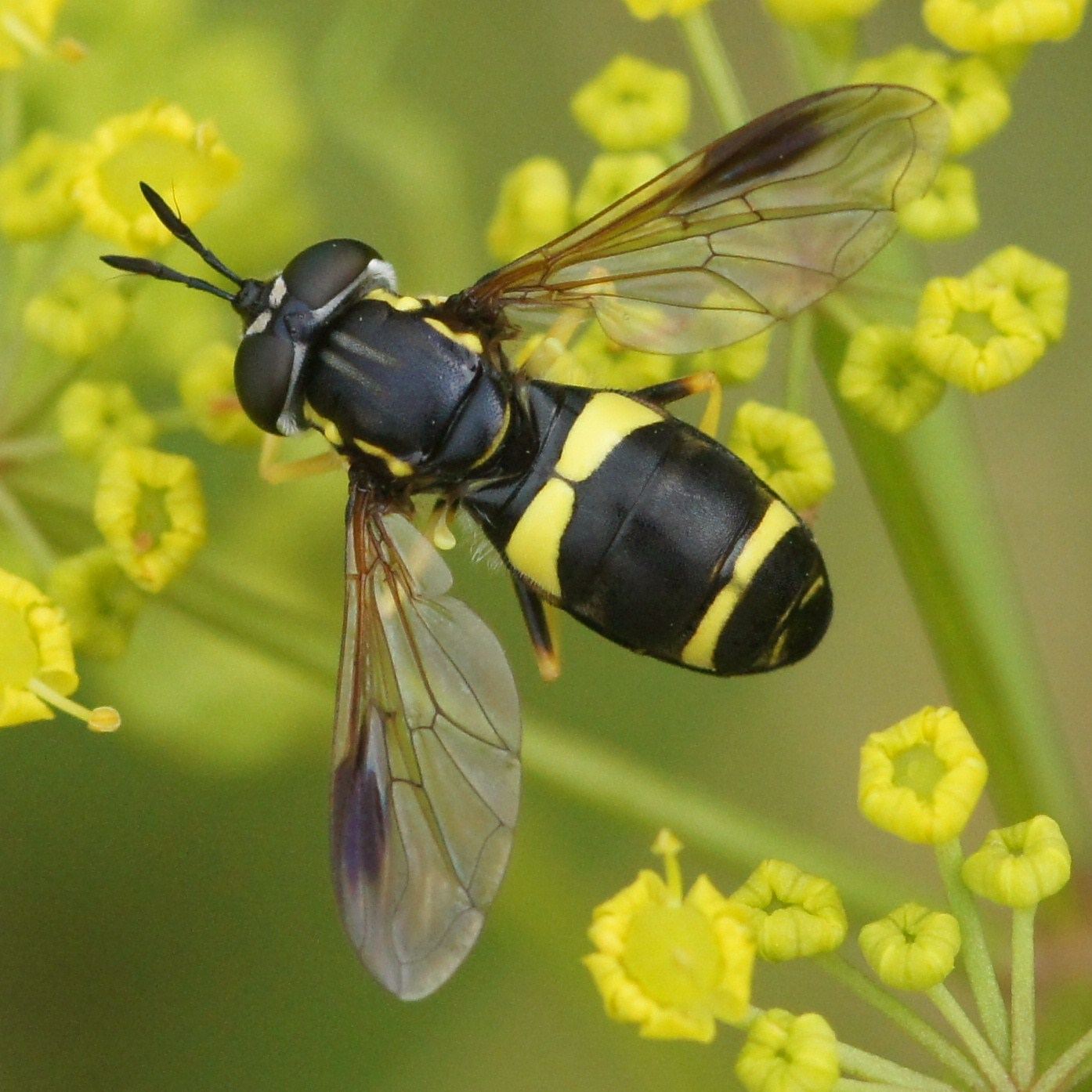
- Female

Scientific classification
- Kingdom: Animalia
- Phylum: Arthropoda
- Class: Insecta
- Order: Diptera
- Family: Syrphidae
- Genus: Chrysotoxum
- Species: C. bicinctum

Binomial name
- Chrysotoxum bicinctum (Linnaeus 1758)

Synonyms
- Chrysotoxum callosum (Harris, 1776); Musca bicinctum Linnaeus 1758; Musca callosum Harris, 1776

= Chrysotoxum bicinctum =

Species of fly

Chrysotoxum bicinctum on flowers (video, 1m 23s)

Chrysotoxum bicinctum is a species of hoverfly.

== Description ==
Chrysotoxum bicinctum can reach a length of about 10–13 millimetres (0.39–0.51 in). This species can be distinguished by the contrasting drawings and by the relatively narrow body shape. Thorax is glossy black with two gray longitudinal stripes. Body is relatively slim, the abdomen is long, oval and black with two light yellow bands (hence the Latin species name bicinctum). As in others Chrysotoxum species antennae are relatively long. They are dark, forward pointing and longer than the head. The head is large and wide and the face is yellow and almost flat. The legs are mainly yellow. The wings are transparent, with a large, dark brown spot near the wing tip.

The larvae are thought to feed on ant-attended root aphids. The adult flies can be found from May to September but they are commonest from mid-June to August. They visit a wide range of flowers.

== Distribution ==
Fennoscandia south to Iberia and the Mediterranean basin, through Central Europe and Southern Europe (Italy, the Balkans, Bulgaria) East into Turkey and European Russia then to central Siberia. It is widespread throughout Britain and Europe but normally encountered in small numbers.

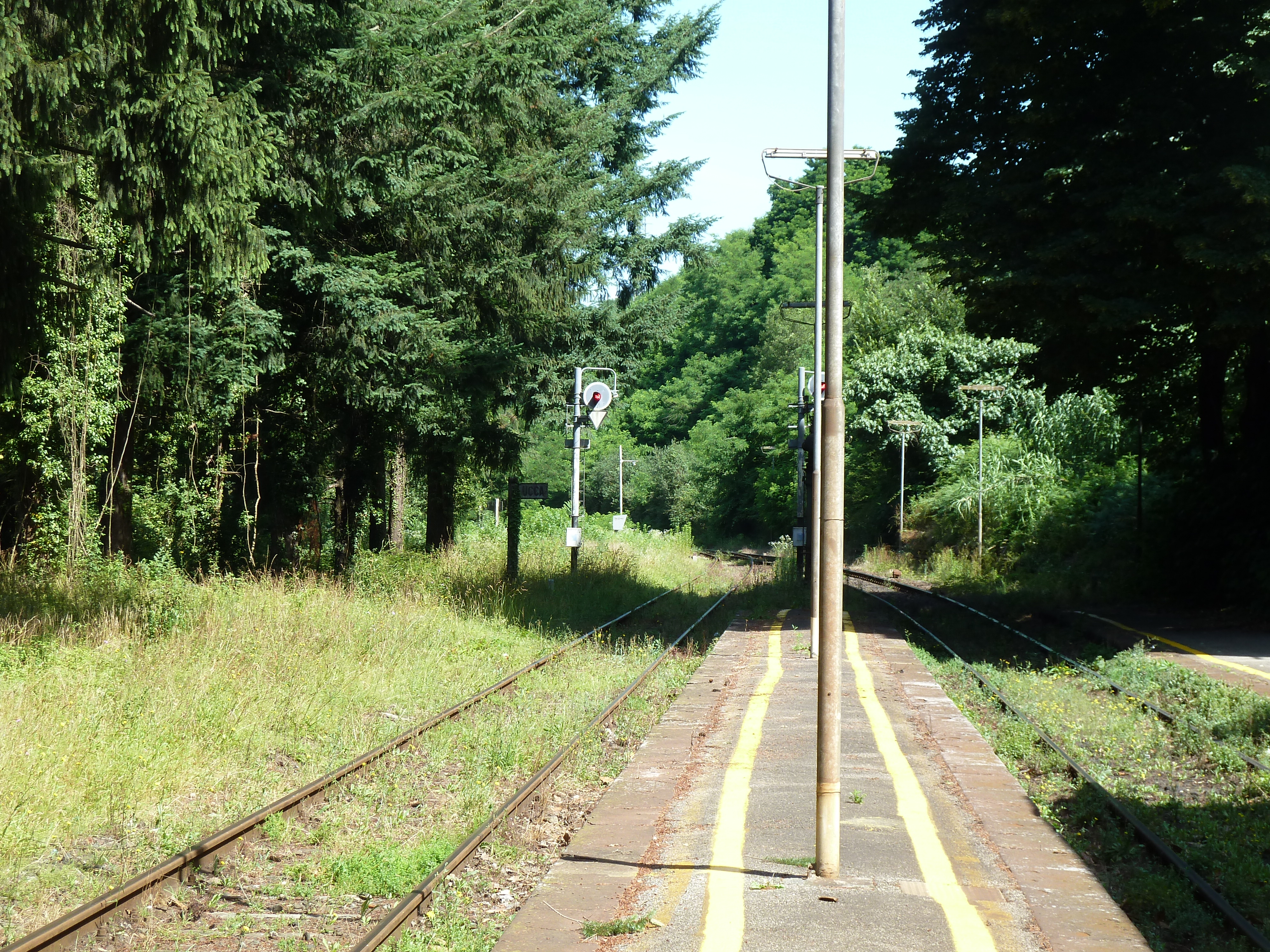
Habitat.Italy

== Habitat ==
Adults are usually found on the edges of woodland or scrub or along hedgerows.

== Bibliography ==
- Speight, M.C.D., Castella, E., Sarthou, J.-P. & Monteil, C. (eds.): Syrph the Net on CD, Issue 7. The database of European Syrphidae. ISSN 1393-4546. Syrph the Net Publications, Dublin.
- van Veen, M.P. Hoverflies of Northwest Europe KNNV Publishing 2004, ISBN 978-90-5011-199-7.
- Systema Dipterorum. Pape T. & Thompson F.C. (eds)
- Fauna Europaea
