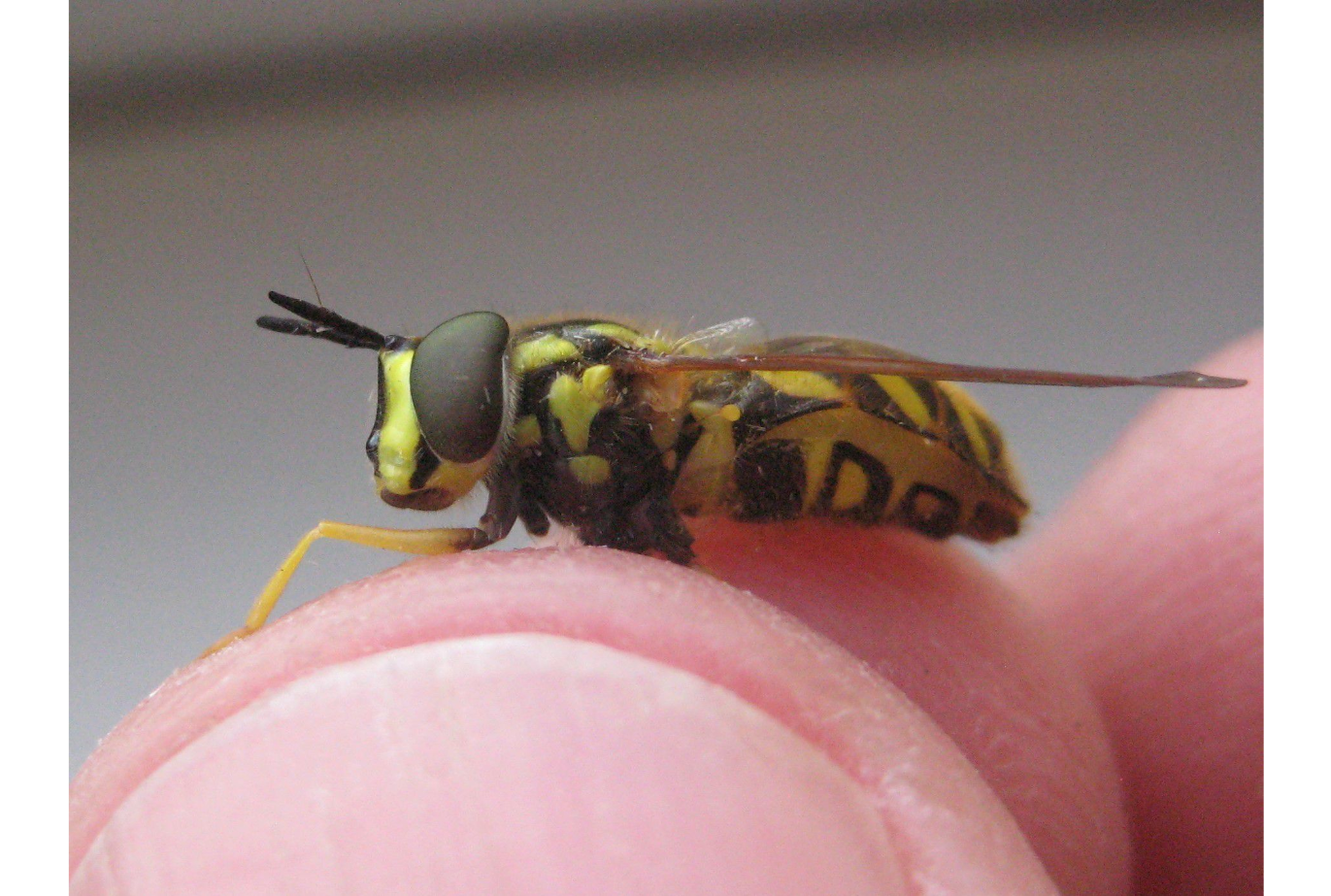

Scientific classification
- Kingdom: Animalia
- Phylum: Arthropoda
- Class: Insecta
- Order: Diptera
- Family: Syrphidae
- Genus: Chrysotoxum
- Species: C. pubescens

Binomial name
- Chrysotoxum pubescens Loew, 1860
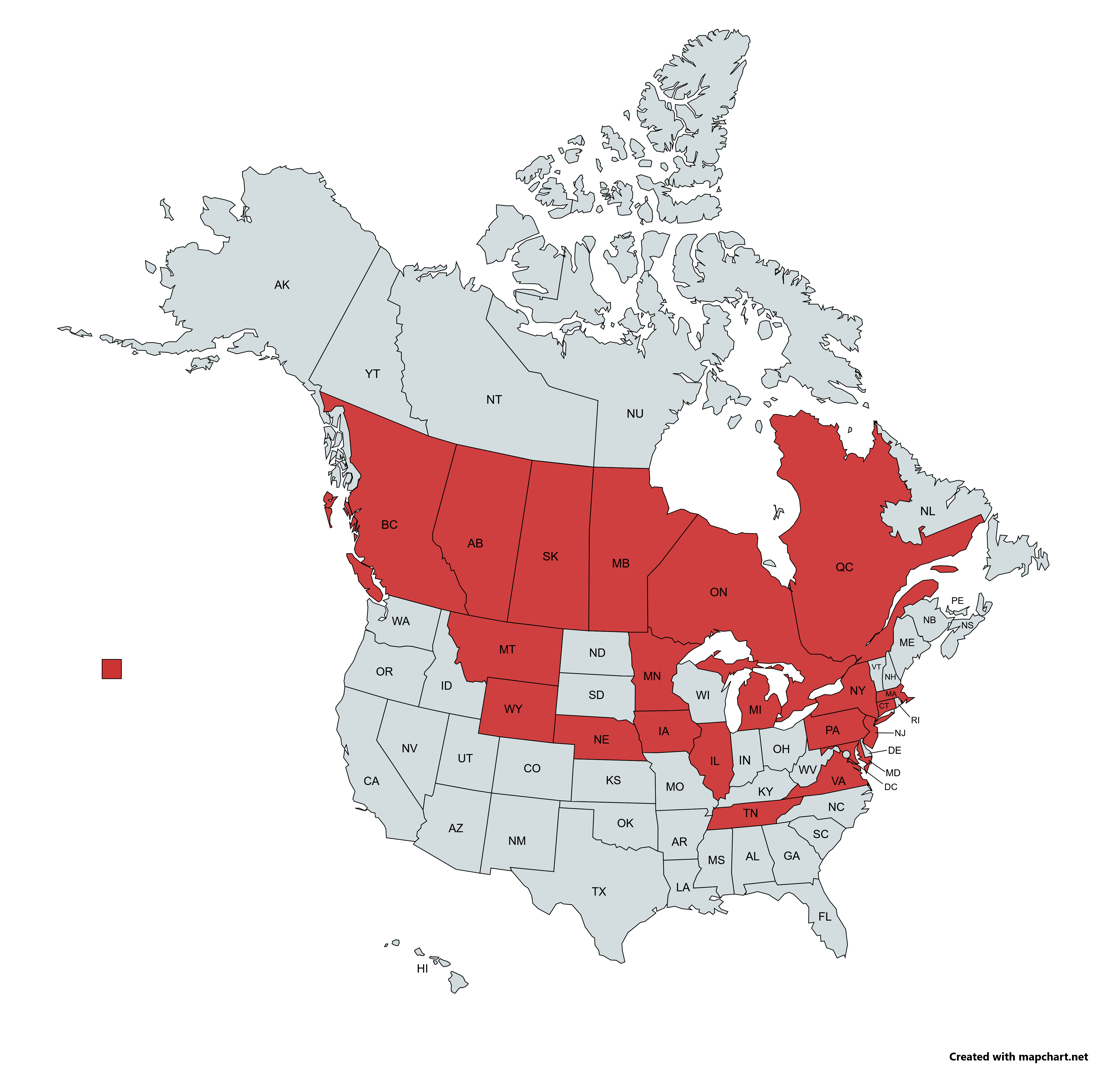
- C.pubescens range 2023

Synonyms
- Chrysotoxum cuneatum Wehr, 1924; Chrysotoxum currani Wehr, 1924; Chrysotoxum luteopilosum Curran, 1924

= Chrysotoxum pubescens =

Species of fly

Chrysotoxum pubescens, the yellow-throated meadow fly, is a North American species of syrphid fly in the family Syrphidae.The adults are strong mimics of wasps. Larvae of this species have been described.

== Description ==
For terminology see Speight key to genera and glossary

Length

1.5 mm (0.06 in)

Head

The antennae are shiny black, with the second joint being longer than the first, and the third joint being subequal to the two preceding together.The eyes are pilose, wide apart in the female, and touching each other in the male . The face is yellow with a black stripe down the middle, and a black stripe at the lower eye margin separates the face from the gena. The underside or cheeks have an extensive pale yellow coloration, which is referred to the common name Yellow-throated Meadow Fly. The frons is black, with long yellow hair. On the female, there is a yellow pile spot on each side above the antenna base.

Thorax: The lateral stripes of the thorax are interrupted, and the median vittulae are conspicuously whitish and pollinose. The proepimeron (above the front coxa) is yellow which is referred to in the common name Yellow-throated Meadow Fly. The scutum is black, covered with sparse, long yellow hair, including the sides (longer on the female). There are obvious, longitudinal grayish pile stripes down the middle, one on each side of the center, which may be faint or absent on the male. There is also a slightly interrupted, wide yellow stripe on the side edges. The scutellum is yellow, with a black center. The pleura of the thorax has a large yellow patch. There is a smaller pale yellow spot below the large patch, sometimes touching, a second small spot close to the head across from the large patch, and two more small spots on each side of the wing base.

Abdomen

The first segment of the abdomen is black, while all the remaining segments have a scant covering of erect, yellow hair. Starting at the lower outside edge of each segment, arched yellow stripes arch to near the base of the segment at the center, and are interrupted at the center. On the lower margin of each segment, there is a slightly lighter yellow stripe, which is thicker at the center and increases in thickness progressively on each segment. Additionally, there is a tiny reddish-orange blotch at the lower edge of each segment, where the stripe starts and the base of the next segment is directly below it. On the fifth segment, there is an elongate yellow triangular spot on the hind margin, with a black inverted V or Y shape between it and the thick yellow fascia. Finally, the venter of the abdomen is black.

Wings
The wing vein R4+5 is clearly dipped into the cell R4+5. The outer edge and base of the wing are slightly tinted and light brownish-yellow. The base cell (bm) is completely filled with pile, and the halteres are reddish-yellow.
Legs

The legs are yellow. The hind femur is more reddish-yellow on the last half, and the tarsi are also more reddish-yellow.

== Distribution ==
The species is found in Canada and United States. (see distribution map)
