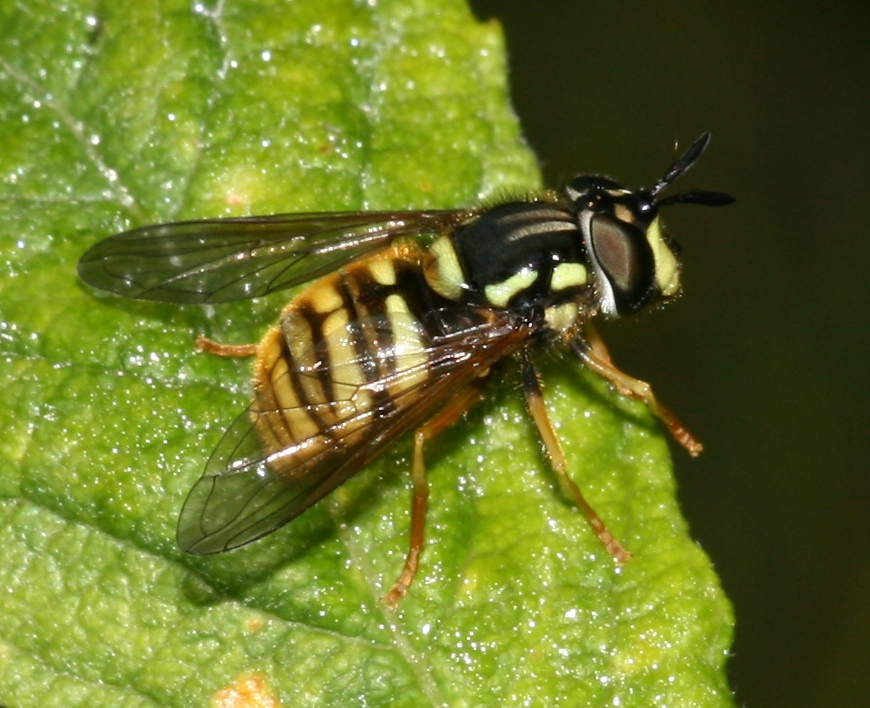

Scientific classification
- Kingdom: Animalia
- Phylum: Arthropoda
- Class: Insecta
- Order: Diptera
- Family: Syrphidae
- Genus: Chrysotoxum
- Species: C. fasciatum

Binomial name
- Chrysotoxum fasciatum (Müller, 1764)

Synonyms
- Chrysotoxum ventricosum Loew, 1864; Chrysotoxum coloradense Greene, 1918

= Chrysotoxum fasciatum =

Species of fly

Chrysotoxum fasciatum is a species of Holarctic hoverfly.

== Identification ==
External images For terms see Morphology of Diptera
Wing length 8-10·25 mm. Orange stigma. No dark wing spot. Apical antennomere longer than antennomeres 1 and 2 together. Abdomen arched, shortly ovate and thick in side view. Scutellum yellow with a darker centre.

Keys and accounts

- Coe R.L. (1953) Syrphidae
- Van Veen, M. (2004) Hoverflies of Northwest Europe
- Van der Goot, V.S. (1981) De zweefvliegen van Noordwest - Europa en Europees Rusland, in het bijzonder van de Benelux
- Bei-Bienko, G.Y. & Steyskal, G.C. (1988) Keys to USSR insects. Diptera

== Distribution ==
Ireland through Europe then East across the Palearctic to Siberia, Kamchatka and Japan. Nearctic Manitoba westwards

== Biology ==
Habitat is wetlands and deciduous and conifer woodlands including fen carr, raised bogs, along stream edges. Also found in unimproved grassland and heath and Betula and Salix scrub. Flowers visited include yellow composites, white umbellifers, Calluna, Frangula alnus, Hypochoeris, Leontodon, Leucojum aestivum, Ligustrum, Luzula sylvatica, Potentilla erecta, Ranunculus, Rubus, Salix repens, Sorbus aucuparia. The flight period is May to September, with peaks in June and August.
