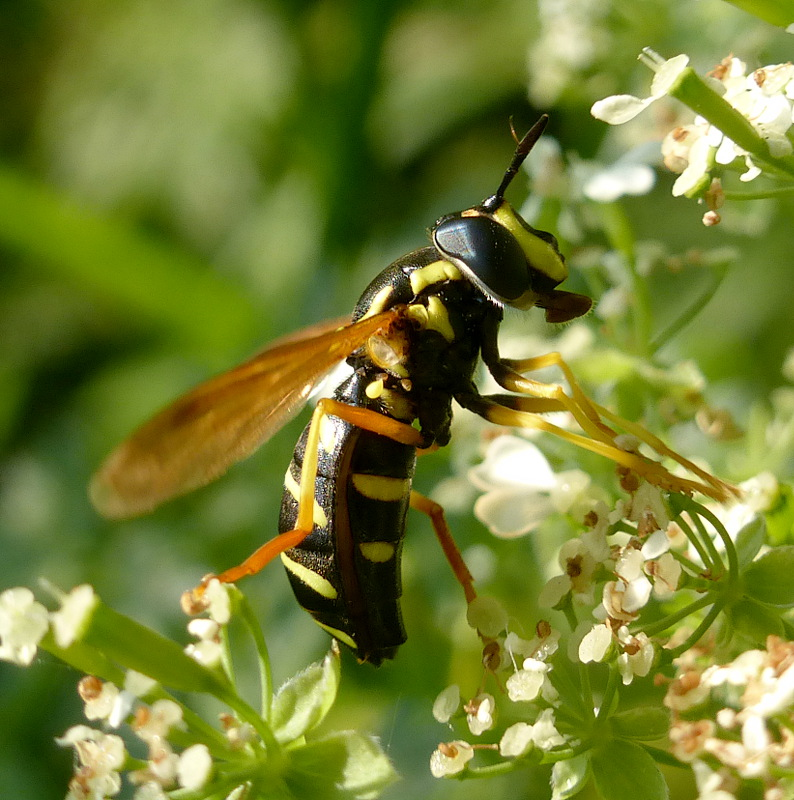

Scientific classification
- Kingdom: Animalia
- Phylum: Arthropoda
- Class: Insecta
- Order: Diptera
- Family: Syrphidae
- Genus: Chrysotoxum
- Species: C. vernale

Binomial name
- Chrysotoxum vernale Loew, 1841

= Chrysotoxum vernale =

Species of fly

Chrysotoxum vernale is a species of hoverfly.
