= Chrysotoxum perplexum =

Scientific classification
- Kingdom: Animalia
- Phylum: Arthropoda
- Class: Insecta
- Order: Diptera
- Family: Syrphidae
- Subfamily: Syrphinae
- Tribe: Syrphini
- Genus: Chrysotoxum
- Species: C. perplexum

Binomial name
- Chrysotoxum perplexum Johnson, 1924

Species of fly

Chrysotoxum perplexum is a North American species of syrphid fly in the family Syrphidae.The adults are strong mimics of wasps. Larvae of this genera, when known, are aphid predators.

== Description ==
For terminology see Speight key to genera and glossary

Length 12 mm (0.47 in)
Head

The face is convex with a prominent tubercule at the lower end of the facial stripe. The vertex and front are black, with the upper part of the front being whitish pollinose. The first joint of the antennae is longer than the second, and the third is slightly longer than the first and second combined. Lastly, the arista is reddish.

Thorax

The scutellum has a broad transverse black band, leaving a narrow yellow margin at the base and apex.

Abdomen

The sides of the first abdominal segment are yellow, and the arcuate bands on the other segments are narrowly interrupted. The arcuate bands on the second and third segments extend to the lateral margin, while the one on the fourth segment is narrowly separated. The posterior margin of the second segment is entirely black, while the yellow posterior marginal band on the third and fourth segments is narrow on the sides and expands in the middle, being widest on the fourth segment. The two elongated spots on the fifth segment are curved, and the central triangle is small, leaving a very broad V-shaped mark.

Wings

The wing vein R4+5 is clearly dipped into cell r4+5, and the costal margin of the wing is brown.

Legs

The base of the front and middle femora are dark brown.

== Distribution ==
United States
Vermont, New Hampshire, New York, Pennsylvania, Maryland, Maine, Virginia, West Virginia.
Canada
Quebec, Nova Scotia, New Brunswick, Saskatchewan.
