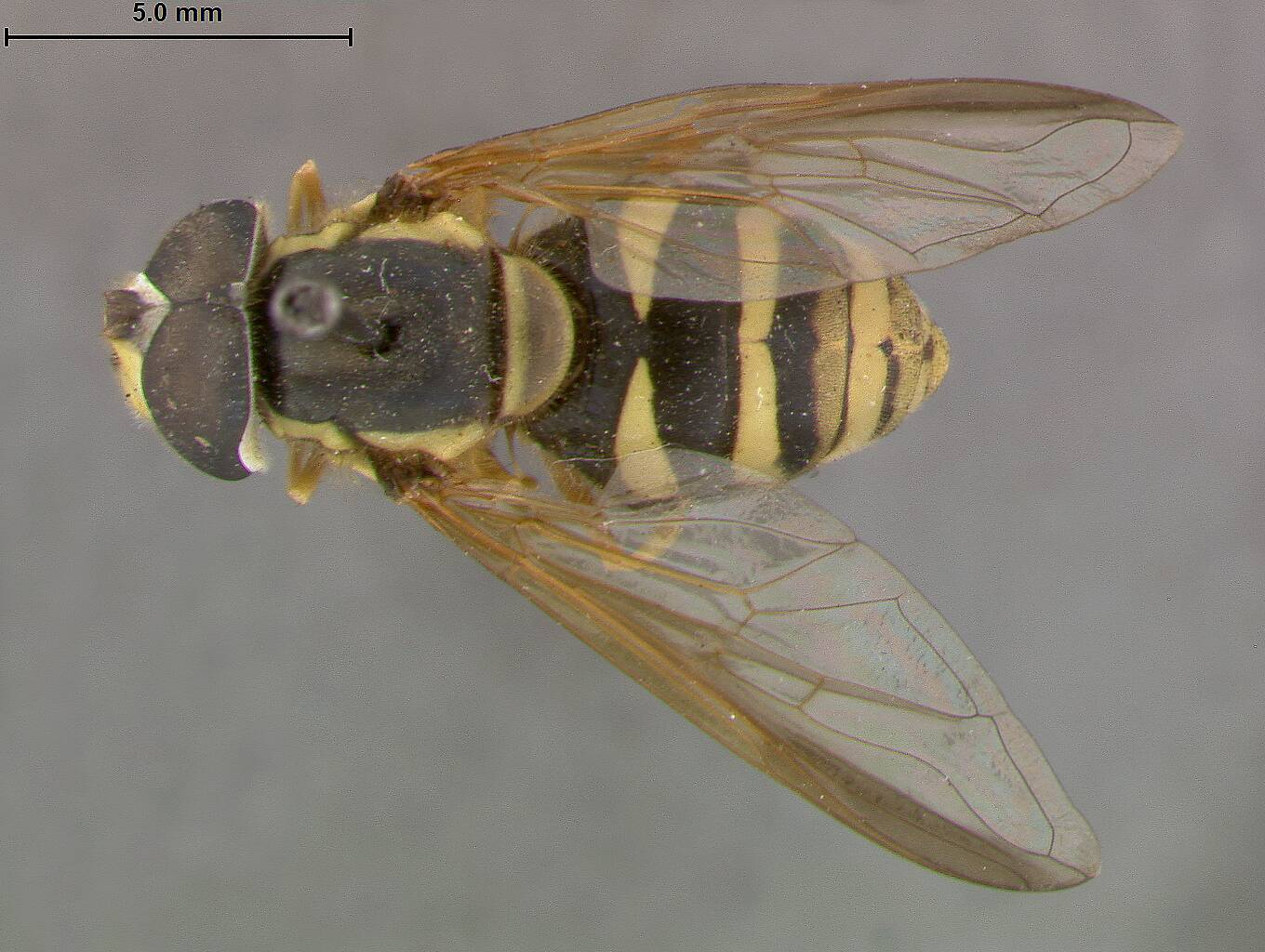
- under the synonym Chrysotoxum coloradense

Scientific classification
- Kingdom: Animalia
- Phylum: Arthropoda
- Class: Insecta
- Order: Diptera
- Family: Syrphidae
- Genus: Chrysotoxum
- Species: C. baphyrum

Binomial name
- Chrysotoxum baphyrum Walker, 1849

Synonyms
- Chrysotoxum coloradense Greene, 1918; Chrysotoxum fasciata Kohli, 1987; Chrysotoxum fasciatus Kohli, Kapoor & Gupta, 1988; Chrysotoxum testaceum Sack, 1913; Musca fasciatum Müller, 1764

= Chrysotoxum baphyrum =

Species of fly

Chrysotoxum baphyrum is a species of holarctic hoverfly. The adults are strong mimics of wasps. Larvae of this genera, when known, are aphid predators.

== Distribution ==
Alaska, Canada, United States, Europe and Asia.

== Description ==
For terminology see Speight key to genera and glossary

Head

The antennae are black, with the first joint slightly shorter than the second, and the third joint slightly longer than the first and second together. The arista is deep yellow, brownish towards the apex. The frons is shiny and brownish-black, with numerous long brown hairs and a broad band of short, yellow pubescence along the eyes. The ocellar triangle is shiny black, with numerous long dark hairs and a whitish pubescence across the base, with the front ocellus being yellowish-white and the basal pair quite reddish. The face is pale yellow, finely pubescent, and covered with numerous yellowish-brown hairs, shorter than those on the frons, with a black stripe reaching from the antennae to the oral margin, very narrow at the antennae and much broader at the facial tubercle. Sometimes this stripe is interrupted by a narrow yellow stripe between the oval margin and the facial tubercle. The gena is yellow, with a broad, shiny, black stripe reaching from the oral margin to the eye.

Thorax

The thorax is black, sub-opaque with a bronze reflection, and isslightly shiny along the sides. It is covered with numerous yellow hairs, more reddish along the sides, with two faint yellowish stripes in the middle extending from half to two-thirds the length of the thorax. The lateral edge has a yellow stripe, broadly interrupted in back of the transverse suture. The pleura is black, with the posterior half of the mesopleura being pale yellow, extending up to the base of the wing. The scutellum is yellow, brownish in the center, with bristly hairs on the basal half being yellow and those on the apical half being brown and slightly longer.

Abdomen

The first and second segments are black, with the second having a yellow, arcuate fascia across the middle, broadly interrupted in the middle and dilated towards the outer edge. The extreme apical edge of the segments may sometimes be yellow. The third segment has a narrow black fascia entirely across the base and widening as it meets the carina, as well as a wider black fascia near the middle extending obliquely towards, but not touching, the apical corner. The fasciae on this segment are variable in width. The fourth and fifth segments have a very narrow black fascia of uneven width along the base, connecting with the carina, with the fourth having a black spot in the center and a longer one towards each apical corner, and the fifth having three black spots in a triangular form. All the black markings on the dorsum and the yellow on the apical part of the last three segments are covered with numerous, short, black, bristly hairs.

Wings

The wing microtrichia is well-developed, and the wing vein R4+5 is clearly dipped into the cell r4+5. The wings are faintly cinerous, with the costal edge lutescent on the basal half and brown on the apical half.

Legs

The legs are mostly yellow, The tarsi are reddish. The front and middle femora have a brownish infuscation at the base, while the hind femora are brownish on the apical half, with the tip being yellow.
