= Chrysotoxum chinook =

Scientific classification
- Domain: Eukaryota
- Kingdom: Animalia
- Phylum: Arthropoda
- Class: Insecta
- Order: Diptera
- Family: Syrphidae
- Tribe: Syrphini
- Genus: Chrysotoxum
- Species: C. chinook

Binomial name
- Chrysotoxum chinook Shannon, 1926

Species of fly

Chrysotoxum chinook is a species of syrphid fly in the family Syrphidae.
