= Chrysotoxum flavifrons =

Scientific classification
- Kingdom: Animalia
- Phylum: Arthropoda
- Class: Insecta
- Order: Diptera
- Family: Syrphidae
- Genus: Chrysotoxum
- Species: C. flavifrons

Binomial name
- Chrysotoxum flavifrons Macquart, 1842

Synonyms
- Chrysotoxum occidenentale Curran, 1924

Species of fly

Chrysotoxum flavifrons, the Blackshield Meadow Fly, is a species of North American hoverfly. They are wasp mimics.

== Description ==
For terminology Speight key to genera and glossary
external link to inaturalist images

Size 17–18 mm (0.67–0.71 in)

Head

The proportions of the three antennal segments are about 3:3:10 In males the frons, has no strong swelling, and upper eye facets that are larger. The male eye has long pile, while it is shorter in females. The face is yellow pollinose with a middle vitta that is broad black to brown median, and a tubercle that is low near the lower margin. The frons is black with lateral yellow stripes.

Thorax

The hairs of the scutum is are black and yellow.. In females, the scutellar hairs are long and dense, and those on the anterior half are not distinctly shorter than those on the posterior half. The hairs of the notopleuron are always partly black, while the hairs of the anepimeron are mostly or entirely black. Other pleural hairs are mostly yellow. The anterior anepisternum typically has 5 to 15 long, fine, erect pale hairs on the lower half, but may have fewer hairs or be bare. The proepimeron is black in color, while the katepisterum is black or obscurely yellowish near the upper margin. The katatergite is black or extensively yellowish. The anepisternum usually has five to 15 hairs on the lower half, but may have fewer hairs or be bare. The katepisternum is black or has an obscure dull yellow spot near the upper margin. Finally, the lateral notopleural hairs and anepimeral hairs are black in color.

Abdomen

The abdominal margins extend beyond the middle of the second tergite and are yellow. The posterolateral angles of tergites 3 and 4 are strongly pointed, with that of tergite 4 being subacute. Tergite 2 has a posterior margin that is black, except laterally in some specimens. The yellow bands on tergites 3 and 4 are divided, and tergite 5 has a black inverted Y that is wider than it is long. Sternite 2 has a bright yellow posterior margin, while sternite 3 has a pair of yellow spots on the anterior half. The surstylus in this species is rather broad and almost evenly tapered from base to apex.

Wings

The wing vein R4+5 in this species is clearly dipped into cell r4+5. The cell bm typically has a distinct bare median stripe but can rarely be entirely trichose. Additionally, the front edge of the wing is brown.

Legs

The legs are yellow in color and have black coxae, trochanters, and bases of the femora. The tabia 3 is slightly curved, while the tarsa are brownish yellow.

== Distribution ==
Canada and United States from the following states and provinces: Yukon, B.C., Nova Scotia, Ontario, New Brunswick, Alberta, Montana, Indiana, Maine, Alaska, California, New Mexico, Colorado, Illinois, Iowa, and Idaho.
