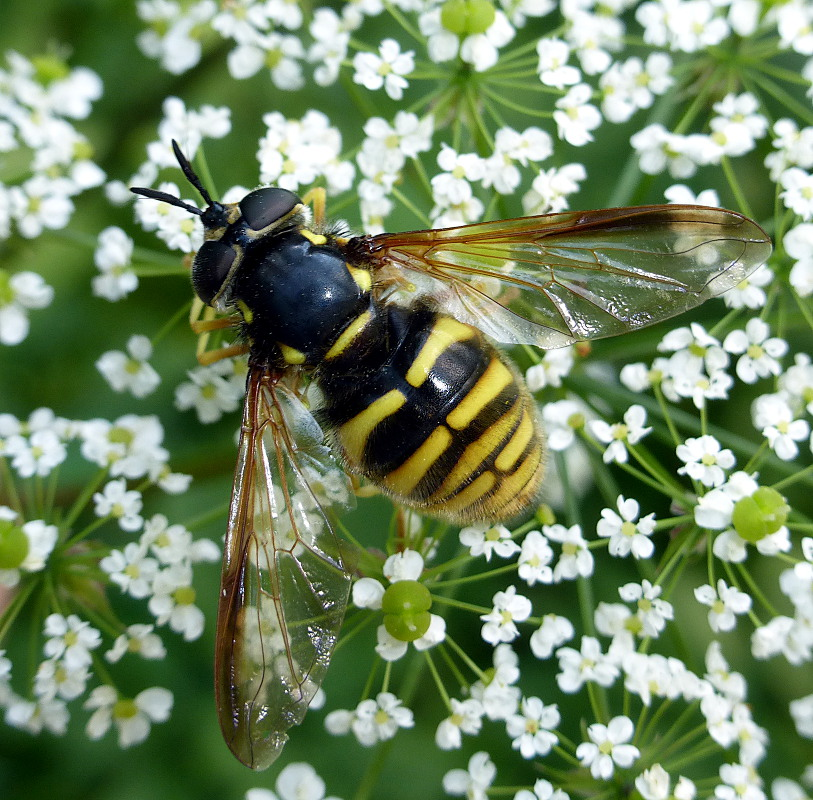

Scientific classification
- Kingdom: Animalia
- Phylum: Arthropoda
- Class: Insecta
- Order: Diptera
- Family: Syrphidae
- Subfamily: Syrphinae
- Tribe: Syrphini
- Genus: Chrysotoxum
- Species: C. fasciolatum

Binomial name
- Chrysotoxum fasciolatum De Geer, 1776

Synonyms
- Show list: Chrysotoxum albopilosum Strobl, 1893; Chrysotoxum costale Wiedemann, 1822; Chrysotoxum marginatum Meigen, 1822; Chrysotoxum sachalinense Matsumura, 1911; Chrysotoxum sachalinensis Matsumura, 1911; Musca fasciolata De Geer, 1776; Syrphus lineola Preyssler, 1793; Syrphus vernus Panzer, 1804

= Chrysotoxum fasciolatum =

Species of fly

Chrysotoxum fasciolatum is a species of holarctic hoverfly. The adults are strong mimics of wasps. Larvae of this genera, when known, are aphid predators.

== Distribution ==
North America, Asia and Europe

== Description ==
For terminology see Speight key to genera and glossary The second antennal joint is longer than broad, and the third joint is two and a half to three times as long as the other two combined. Pteropleura with black pile.The lateral margins of tergites two to five alternating black and yellow, with arcuate abdominal bands interrupted and broader, less arcuate abdominal fasciae, with the front edge of the interrupted fasciae being almost parallel with the anterior margins of the segments. The wing microtrichia is well developed, and the wing vein R_{4+5} is clearly dipped into cell r_{4+5}. There is no yellow spot above the fore coxa.
