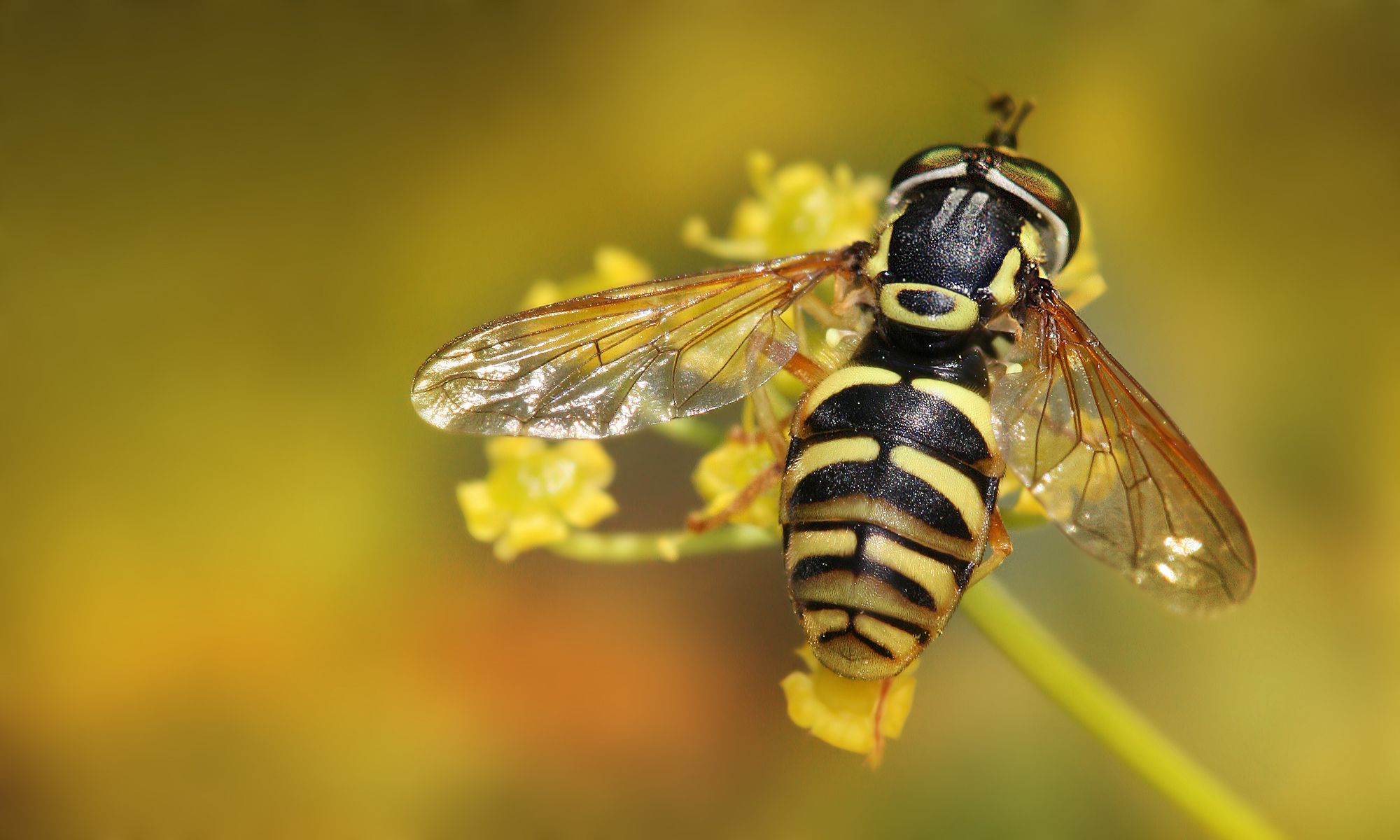

Scientific classification
- Kingdom: Animalia
- Phylum: Arthropoda
- Class: Insecta
- Order: Diptera
- Family: Syrphidae
- Genus: Chrysotoxum
- Species: C. cautum

Binomial name
- Chrysotoxum cautum (Harris, 1776)

Synonyms
- Chrysotoxum fasciolatum Curtis, 1837; Chrysotoxum marginatu Curtis, 1837; Musca cautum Harris, 1776

= Chrysotoxum cautum =

Species of fly

Chrysotoxum cautum is a species of Palearctic hoverfly of the genus Chrysotoxum. The larvae are thought to feed on root aphids. Adults are usually found on the edges of woodland or scrub or along hedgerows where they visit a wide range of flowers, usually in small numbers.

== Identification ==
C. Cautum has a wing length of 10–13mm. It has an orange stigma, apical antennomere as long as antennomeres 1 and 2 together, a relatively flat abdomen, exceptionally large genitalia, and they reach over the hind margin of sternite 4. (Note: Keys and accounts: Coe R.L. (1953) Syrphidae; Van Veen, M. (2004) Hoverflies of Northwest Europe; Van der Goot, V.S. (1981) De zweefvliegen van Noordwest - Europa en Europees Rusland, in het bijzonder van de Benelux; Bei-Bienko, G.Y. & Steyskal, G.C. (1988) Keys to USSR insects. Diptera)

== Biology ==
C. cautum is a Palearctic species. It has been found in southern Britain, continental Europe and as far as the Altai Mountains and Mongolia.

C. cautum can be found in deciduous forests and scrub, unimproved and lightly grazed grassland, open areas in forest or scrub on well-drained sites.

The hoverfly visits flowers such as white umbellifers; yellow composites, Allium ursinum, Caltha, Cornus, Crataegus, Euphorbia, Geranium, Plantago, Ranunculus, Rhamnus catharticus, Rubus and Sorbus aucuparia. The species' flight period is between May and July (April in southern Europe).
