= Chrysotoxum derivatum =

Scientific classification
- Kingdom: Animalia
- Phylum: Arthropoda
- Class: Insecta
- Order: Diptera
- Family: Syrphidae
- Genus: Chrysotoxum
- Species: C. derivatum

Binomial name
- Chrysotoxum derivatum Walker, 1849

Synonyms
- Chrysotoxum integre Williston, 1887; Chrysotoxum plumeum Johnson, 1924; Chrysotoxum columbianum Curran, 1927; Chrysotoxum minor Curran, 1927

Species of fly

Chrysotoxum derivatum is a species of North American hoverfly.

== Description ==
8.9–16.2mm in length.

== Distribution ==
Southern Alaska, Canada, United States & Mexico.
