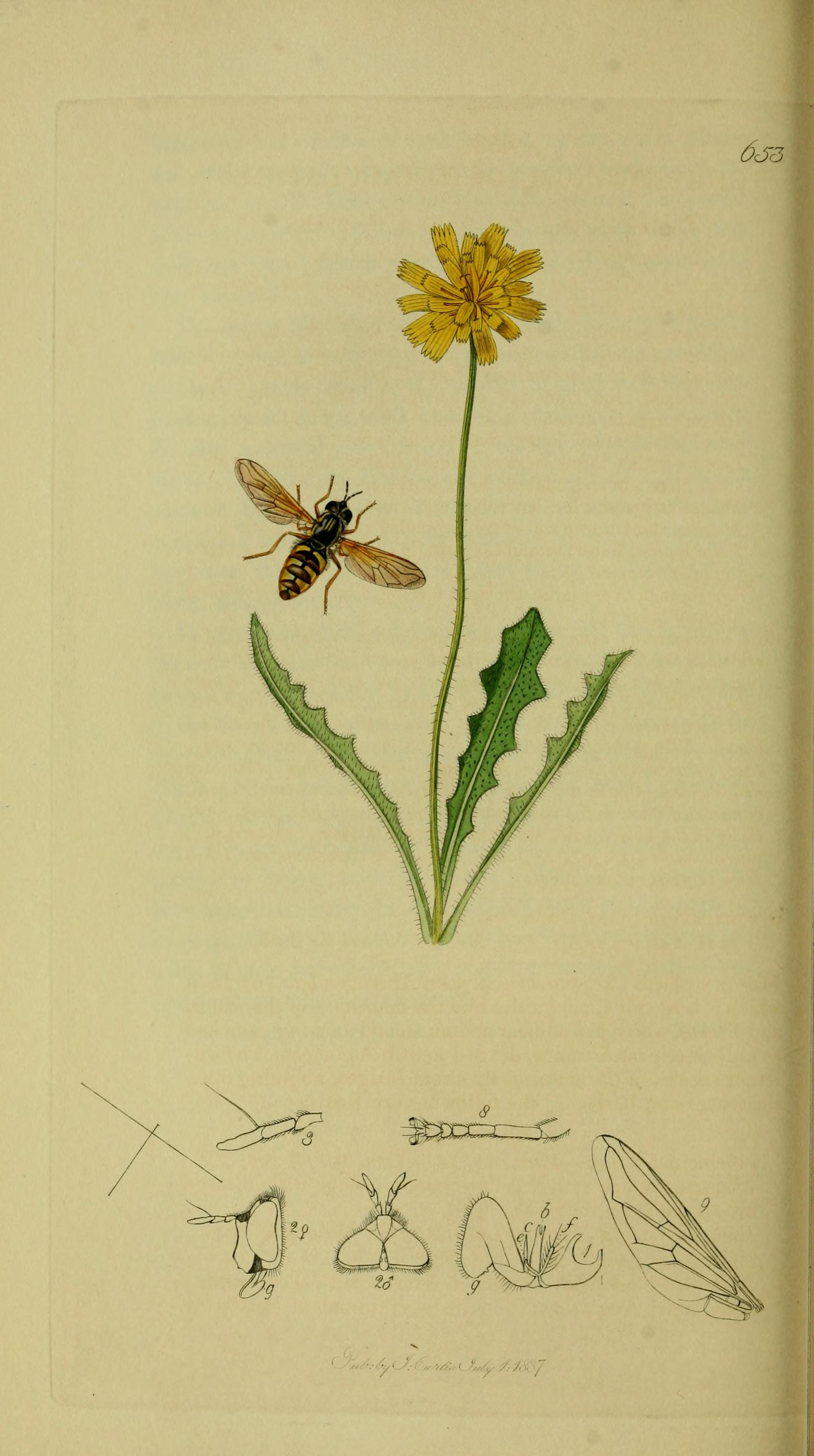

Scientific classification
- Kingdom: Animalia
- Phylum: Arthropoda
- Class: Insecta
- Order: Diptera
- Family: Syrphidae
- Genus: Chrysotoxum
- Species: C. octomaculatum

Binomial name
- Chrysotoxum octomaculatum Curtis, 1831

= Chrysotoxum octomaculatum =

Species of fly

Chrysotoxum octomaculatum, the broken-banded wasp-hoverfly, is a species of hoverfly within the genus Chrysotoxum and family Syrphidae.

It has been placed onto the UK Biodiversity Action Plan list of priority species.

== Distribution and habitat ==
It inhabits clearings within scrub woodland and deciduous forest ranging from Fennoscandia to Northern Africa.

Found in Europe, Southern Russia, Armenia, Kazakhstan. Can also be found in mountain habitats in northeast, central and western Greece, including regions such as Peloponnese and Crete.

Within the United Kingdom the species is found in heathland habitats. Outside of the United Kingdom it is known to live in both deciduous and coniferous woodlands.

== Reproduction ==
Larvae have an associated with Black garden ants (Lasius niger), as described by Speight (1976).

Flight period from May to September, peaking June/August.

== Ecology ==
An array of flowers are visited including: Calluna, Chaerophyllum, Cirsium arvense, Euphorbia, Galium, Hieracium, Hypochoeris, Narthecium, Origanum, Potentilla erecta, Ranunculus, Rosa rugosa, Rubus idaeus, Sambucus nigra, Senecio, Solidago canadensis, S.virgaurea.
