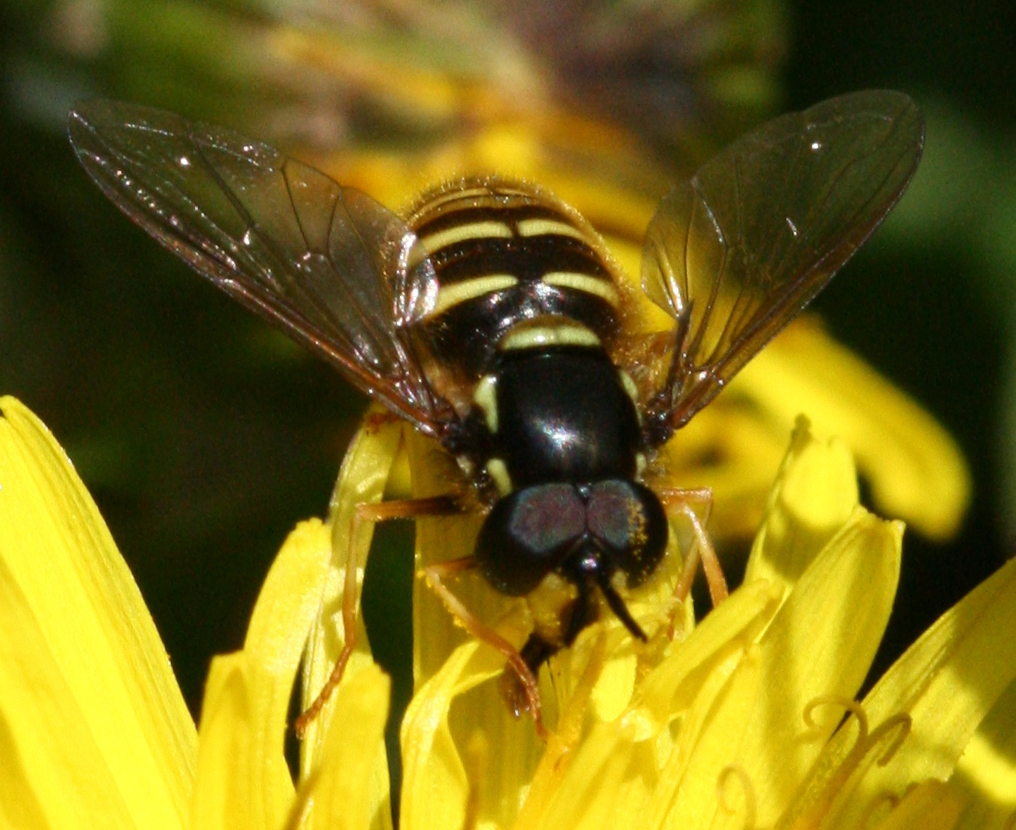
- male
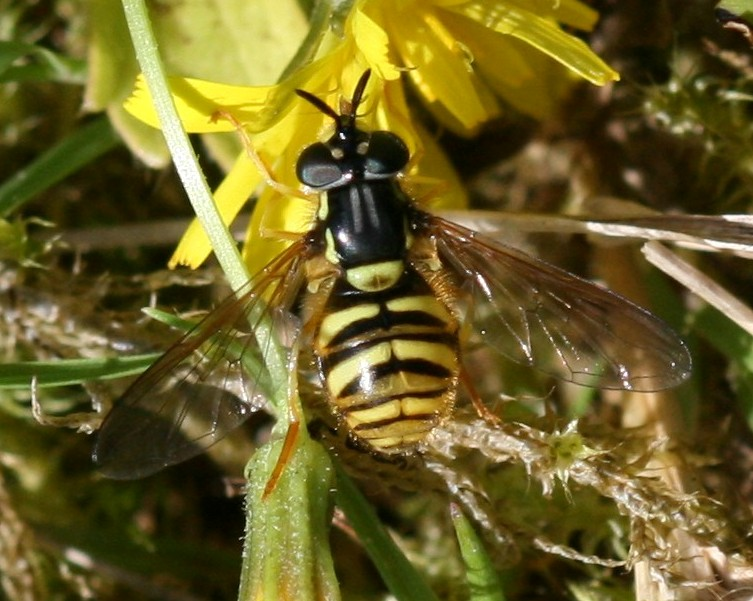
- female

Scientific classification
- Kingdom: Animalia
- Phylum: Arthropoda
- Class: Insecta
- Order: Diptera
- Family: Syrphidae
- Genus: Chrysotoxum
- Species: C. arcuatum

Binomial name
- Chrysotoxum arcuatum (Linnaeus, 1758)

Synonyms
- Musca arcuata Linnaeus, 1758; Chrysotoxum fasciatum Müller

= Chrysotoxum arcuatum =

Species of fly

Chrysotoxum arcuatum, is a species of hoverfly. It is widespread throughout Britain and Ireland but much more common in the upland districts of the north and west where it is typically found at ground level near woodland and moorland edges. The larvae are thought to feed on root aphids associated with ant colonies.
