= Chrysotoxum elegans =

Scientific classification
- Kingdom: Animalia
- Phylum: Arthropoda
- Class: Insecta
- Order: Diptera
- Family: Syrphidae
- Genus: Chrysotoxum
- Species: C. elegans

Binomial name
- Chrysotoxum elegans Loew, 1841

Synonyms
- Chrysotoxum intermedium Walker, 1851; Chrysotoxum latilimbatum Collin, 1940

Species of fly

Chrysotoxum elegans is a species of hoverfly. It is found in southern mainland Europe. The larvae are thought to feed on root aphids.
