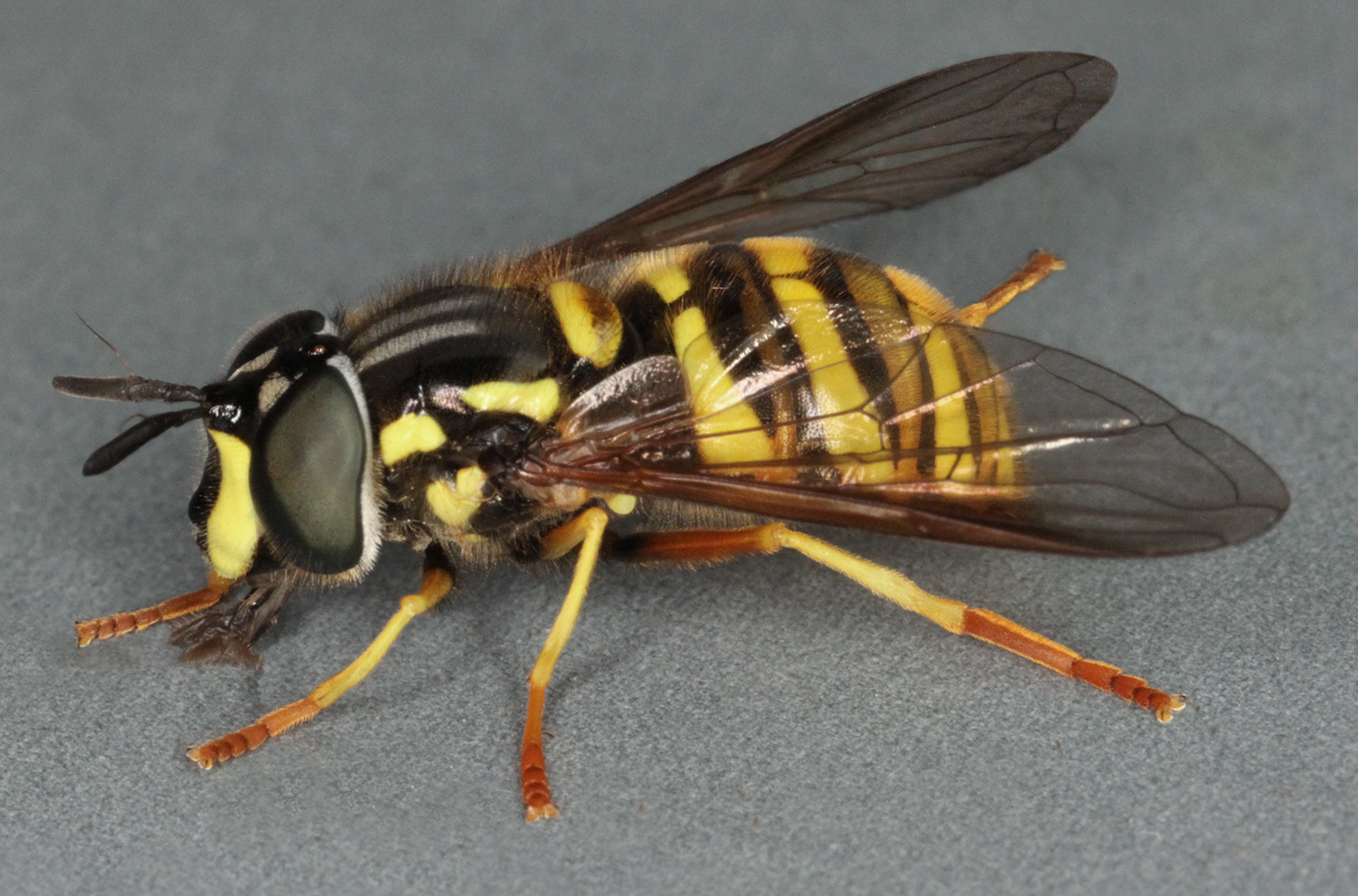
- Female Chrysotoxum arcuatum

Scientific classification
- Kingdom: Animalia
- Phylum: Arthropoda
- Clade: Pancrustacea
- Class: Insecta
- Order: Diptera
- Family: Syrphidae
- Tribe: Syrphini
- Genus: Chrysotoxum; Meigen, 1803

= Chrysotoxum =

Genus of flies

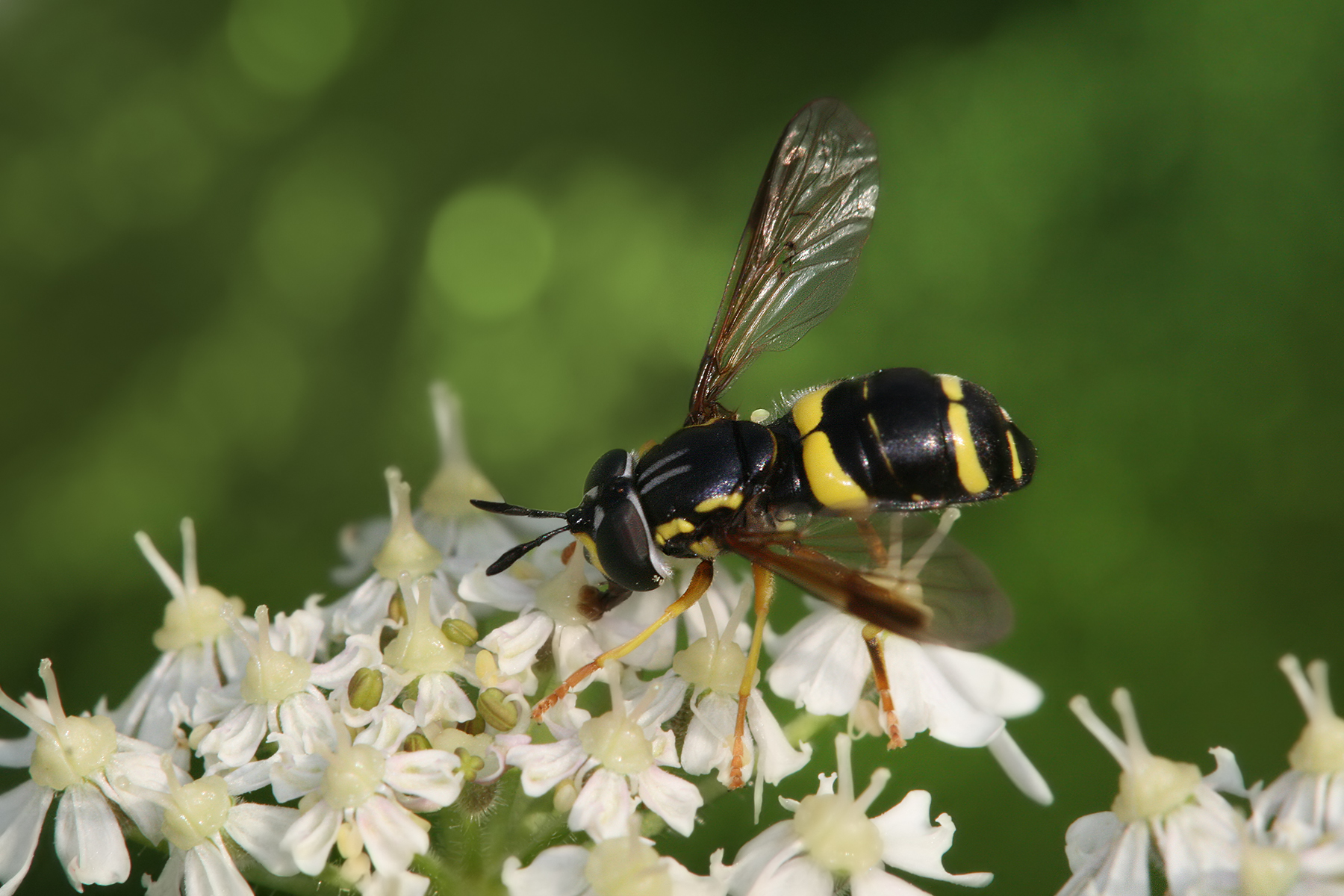
Female Chrysotoxum bicinctum

The genus Chrysotoxum (Meigen, 1803) consists of large, wasp-mimicking species. The adults are distinguished by very long antennae, oval abdomen with yellow stripes, and yellow patterns on the thoracic pleurae (sides of the thorax). The species of Chrysotoxum are chiefly Holarctic in distribution. . The species in this genus, are mostly very uniform in structure and colour and are separated with difficulty. Larvae are specialized in preying upon root aphids associated with ant nests.

== Taxonomy ==
Chrysotoxum is the only genus in the tribe Chrysotoxini Features common to this genus are: The head is slightly wider than the thorax. The eyes are more or less pubescent and are contiguous (contacting each other medially) in males and widely separated in females. They have a prominent or angular frons and antennae base, features best seen in profile. The face is slightly concave. The antennae are long and erect, inserted on the frontal angle, with the first two segments nearly equal, and the third one (flagellum) is three to six times longer than the previous ones. Abdomen strongly convex dorsally, very deeply margined. The wings have the median transverse vein located before the middle of the discal cell. The wing vein R_{4+5} clearly dipped into cell r_{4+5}.

There are many Chrysotoxum taxonomy concerns yet to be resolved due to the few morphological features available for species characterization. Characters frequently used: the color of legs, the overall size, the connections between the various abdominal stripes and spots have been found to vary considerably within a species. Differences in male terminalia, often of great diagnostic value in other genera are, so far, unhelpful among the majority of Chrysotoxum species.

== Species ==
- C. amurense Violovitsh, 1973
- C. arcuatum (Linnaeus, 1758)
- C. asiaticum Becker, 1921
- C. bactrianum Violovitsh, 1973
- C. bajkalicum Violovitsh, 1973
- C. baphyrum Walker, 1849
- C. bicinctum (Linnaeus, 1758)
- C. caucasicum Sack, 1930
- C. cautum (Harris, 1776)
- C. chakassicum Violovitsh, 1975
- C. chinook Shannon, 1926
- C. cisalpinum Rondani, 1845
- C. continum Bezzi, 1915
- C. coreanum Shiraki, 1930
- C. derivatum Walker, 1849
- C. elegans Loew, 1841
- C. fasciatum (Müller, 1764)
- C. fasciolatum (De Geer, 1776)
- C. festivum (Linnaeus, 1758)
- C. flaveolum Violovitsh, 1973
- C. flavifrons Macquart, 1842
- C. fratellum Shannon, 1926
- C. gracile Becker, 1921
- C. graciosum Violovitsh, 1975
- C. grandis Matsumura, 1911
- C. hameleon Violovitsh, 1973
- C. impressum Becker, 1921
- C. integrum
- C. intermedium Meigen, 1822
- C. kozhevnikovi Smirnov, 1925
- C. kozlovi Violovitsh, 1973
- C. lanulosum Violovitsh, 1973
- C. laterale Loew, 1864
- C. latifasciatum Becker, 1921
- C. lessonae Giglio-Tos, 1890
- C. lineare (Zetterstedt, 1819)
- C. lydiae Violovitsh, 1964
- C. montivagum Violovitsh, 1973
- C. octomaculatum Curtis, 1837
- C. parmense Rondani, 1845
- C. parvulum Violovitsh, 1973
- C. perplexum Johnson, 1924
- C. przewalskyi Portschinsky, 1887
- C. pubescens Loew, 1864
- C. radha Violovitsh, 1971
- C. radiosum Shannon, 1926
- C. ramphostoma Mutin, 1999
- C. rhodopense Drensky, 1934
- C. robustum Portschinsky, 1887
- C. rossicum Becker, 1921
- C. rubzovi Violovitsh, 1973
- C. sackeni Giglio-Tos, 1890
- C. sapporense Matsumura, 1916
- C. sibiricum Loew, 1856
- C. skufjini Violovitsh, 1973
- C. stackelbergi Violovitsh, 1953
- C. stenolomum Violovitsh, 1973
- C. subbicinctum Violovitsh, 1956
- C. testaceum Sack, 1913
- C. triarcuatum Macquart in Webb & Berthelot, 1839
- C. verae Violovitsh, 1973
- C. vernale Loew, 1841
- C. verralli Collin, 1940
- C. villosulum Bigot, 1883
- C. willistoni Curran, 1924
- C. ypsilon Williston, 1887
