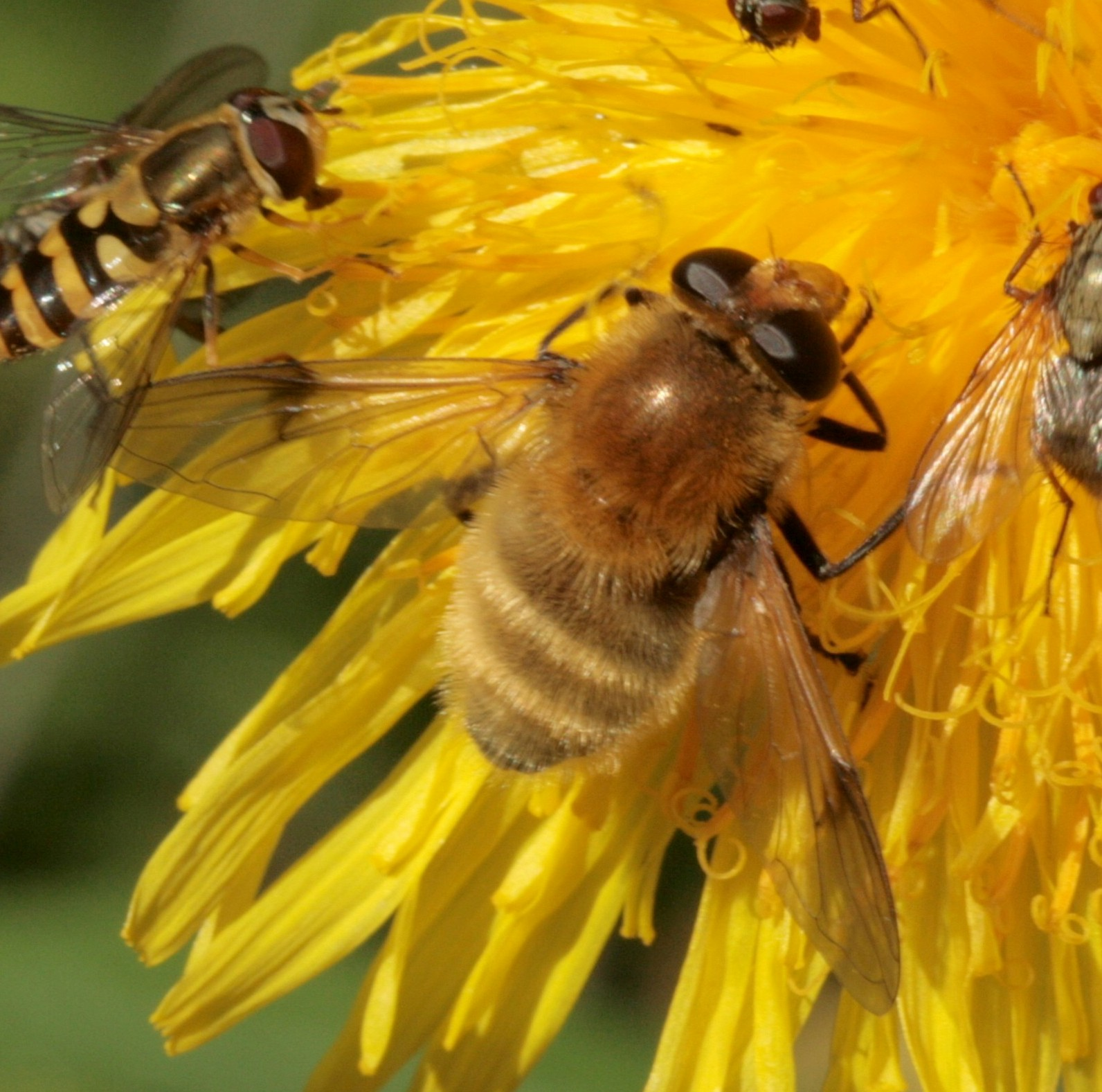
- Sericomyia superbiens

Scientific classification
- Kingdom: Animalia
- Phylum: Arthropoda
- Class: Insecta
- Order: Diptera
- Family: Syrphidae
- Subfamily: Eristalinae
- Tribe: Sericomyiini

Genera
- Arctophila; Conosyrphus; Pararctophila; Pseudovolucella; Pyritis; Sericomyia

= Sericomyiini =

Tribe of flies

Sericomyiini is a tribe of hoverflies consisting mainly of large bumblebee or wasp mimics. As with Eristalini the larvae have a telescopic breathing tube which allows them to breathe while submerged in boggy areas.

The tribe is sometimes classified under Eristalini as the subtribe Sericomyiina.

== Taxonomy of genera and subgenera ==
- Arctophila subgenera of Sericomyia
- Conosyrphus subgenus? of 2 species of Hoverfly, one (volucellinus) a unique endemic of the Caucasus region and the other characteristic of the Siberian arctic.
- Pararctophila Herve-Bazin, 1914 Asian 2 species Pararctophila external images
- Pseudovolucella Shiraki, 1930 ten species. They are bee mimics found mostly in the mountains of south east Asia and Japan.10 species Pseudovolucella external link
- Pyritis Hunter, 1897 one species western North America North America Pyritis external images
- Sericomyia Meigen, 1803 30 species common in boreal forests across the Holarctic region and extend southward at higher elevations into the Oriental region and Neotropical regions.

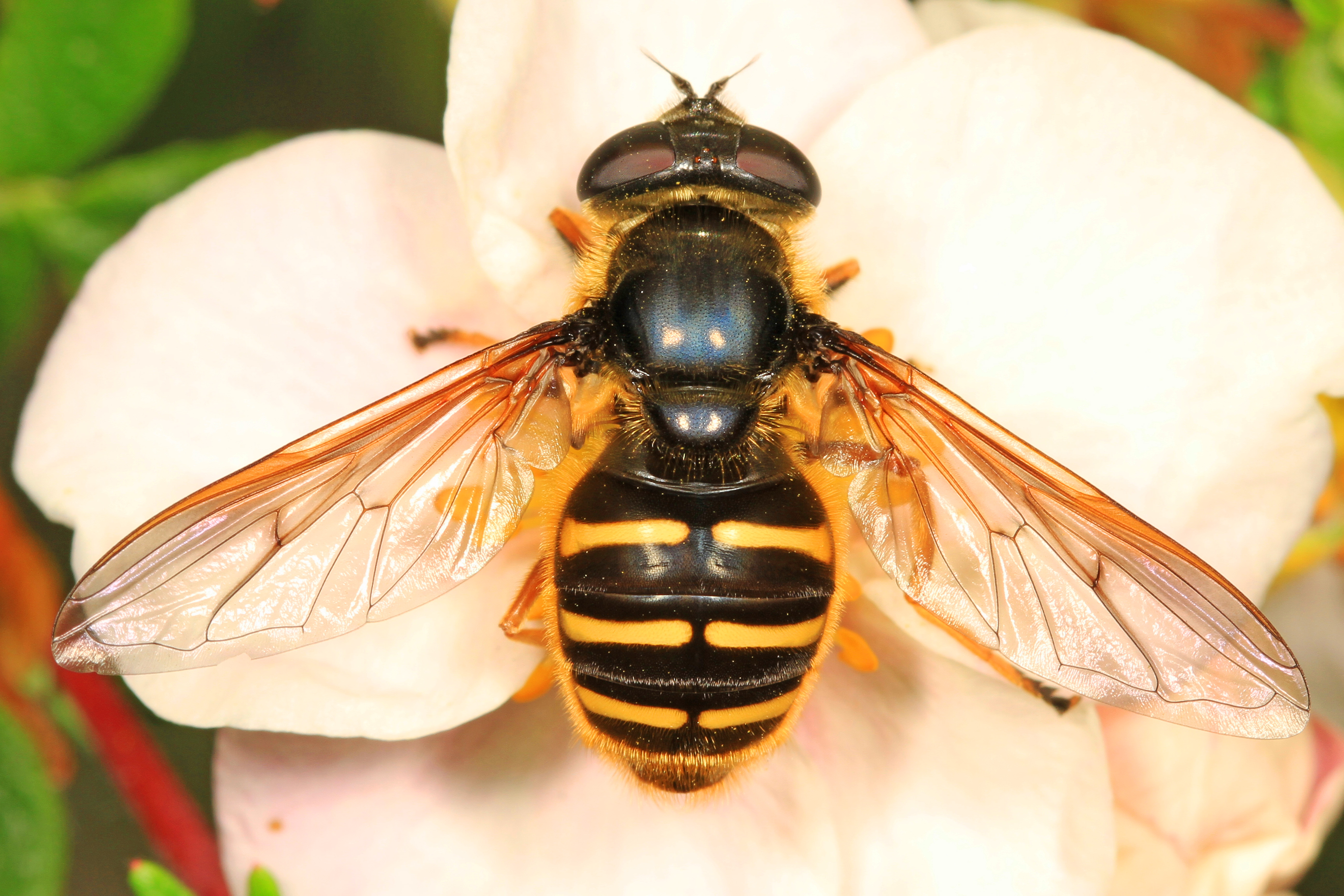
Sericomyia chalcopyga

- Pseudovolucella Shiraki, 1930 All but one, an EastPalaearctic species, occur in the Oriental region.

Pseudovolucella decipiens external link to Pseudovolucella decipiens
