= Arctophila =

Arctophila is the scientific name of two groups of organisms. It can refer to:

- Arctophila (fly), a subgenus of flies in the family Syrphidae
- Arctophila (plant), a genus of plants in the family Poaceae
