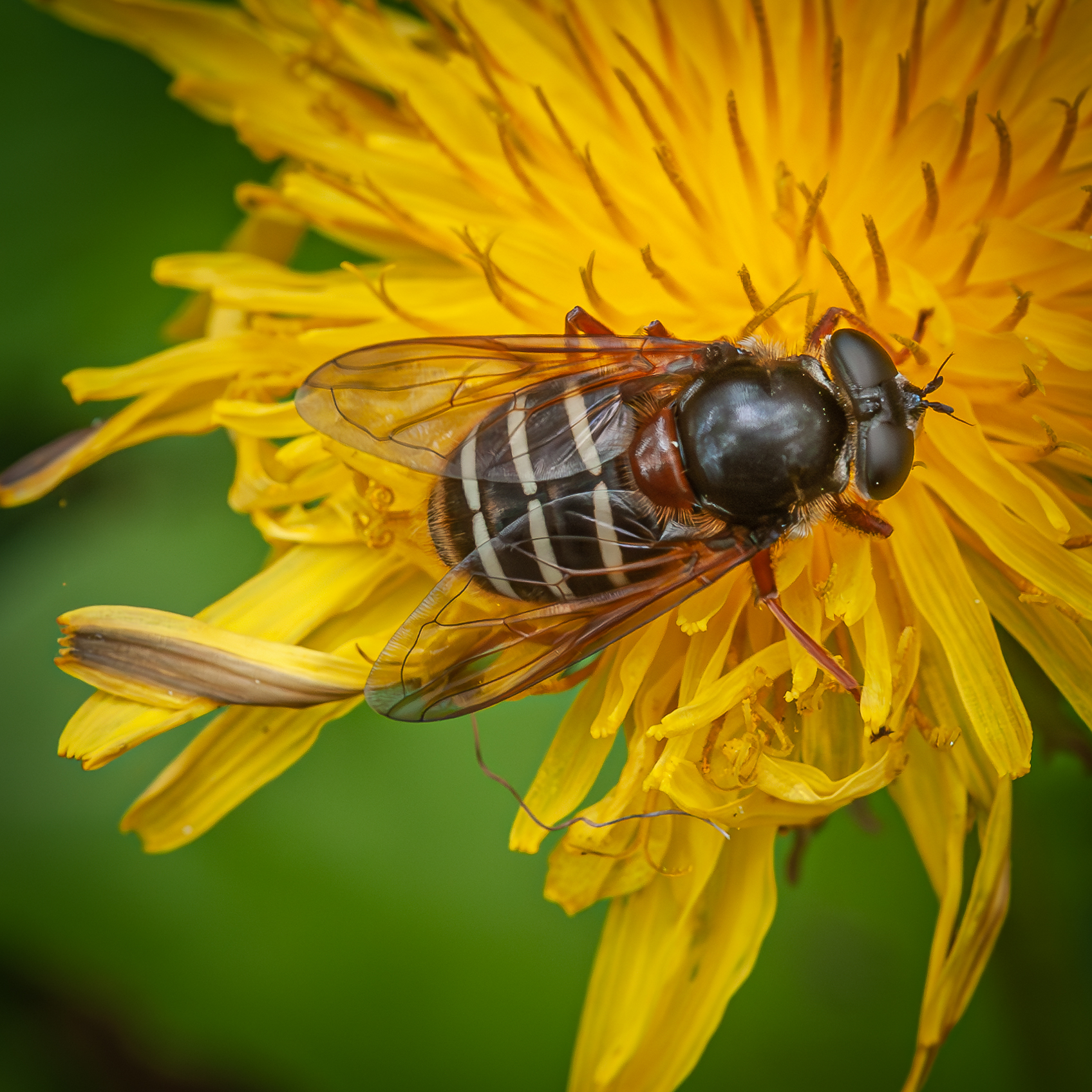
- male

Scientific classification
- Kingdom: Animalia
- Phylum: Arthropoda
- Class: Insecta
- Order: Diptera
- Family: Syrphidae
- Genus: Sericomyia
- Species: S. lappona

Binomial name
- Sericomyia lappona (Linnaeus, 1758)

Synonyms
- Musca lappona Linnaeus, 1758

= Sericomyia lappona =

Species of fly

Sericomyia lappona, is a species of hoverfly. It is widespread throughout the Palearctic.

== Description ==
External images For terms see Morphology of Diptera
Wing length 9·5–14 mm. Knob of halteres black. Legs reddish, femorae darkened at base. Tergites 3 and 4 bands whitish-yellow and narrow (less than 1/3 tergite length), and with a short median interruption. Scutellum reddish. See references for determination

== Distribution ==
Palearctic Fennoscandia South to the Pyrenees. Ireland East through North Europe, Central Europe and South Europe (North Italy, Yugoslavia) into European Russia and through Siberia and the Russian Far East to the Pacific coast (Sakhalin Island).

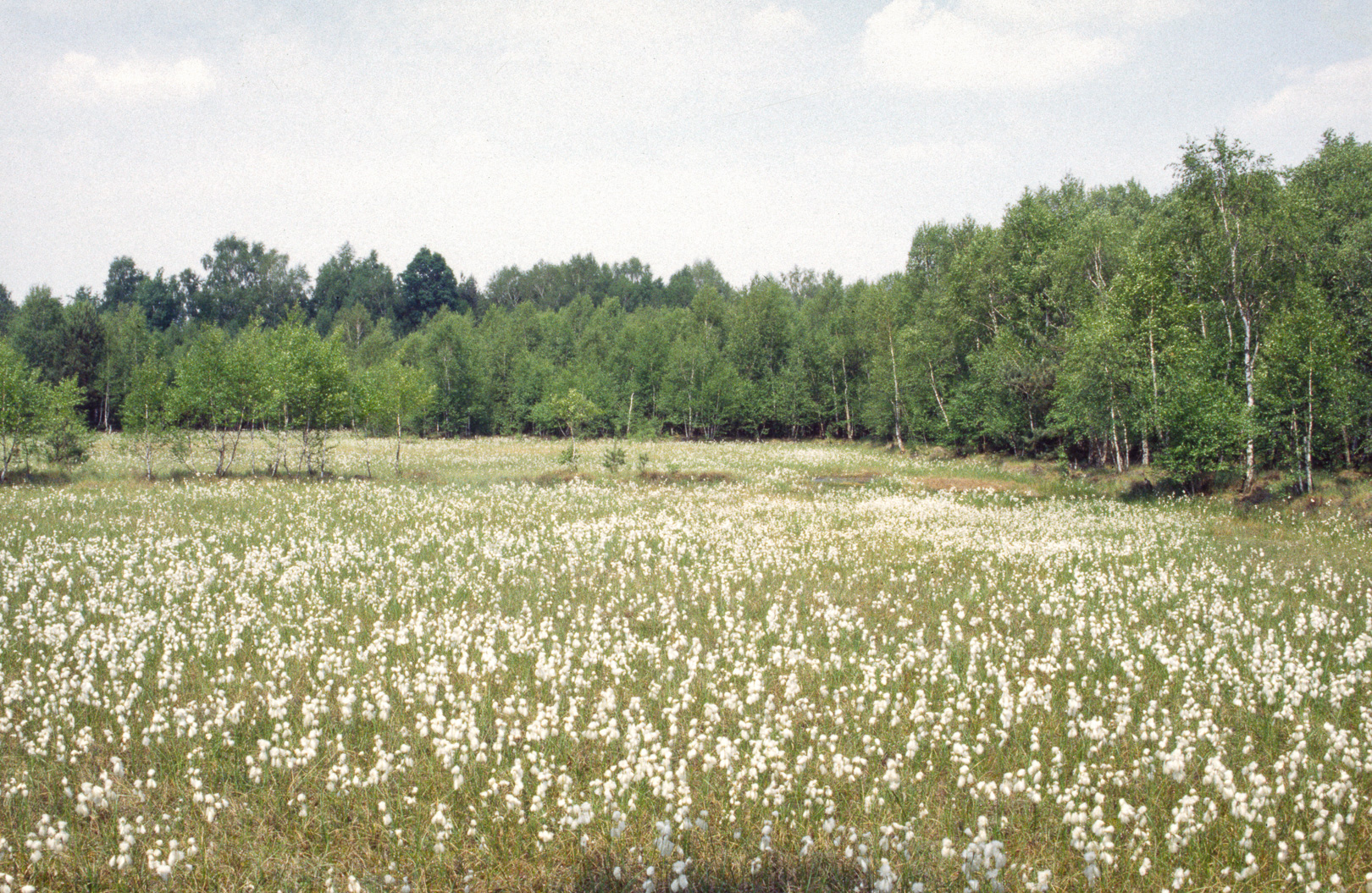
Habitat.Poland.

== Biology ==
Habitat: Quercus, Betula and Pinus woodland, Salix carr, fen, bog and moorland. Flies May to September.
