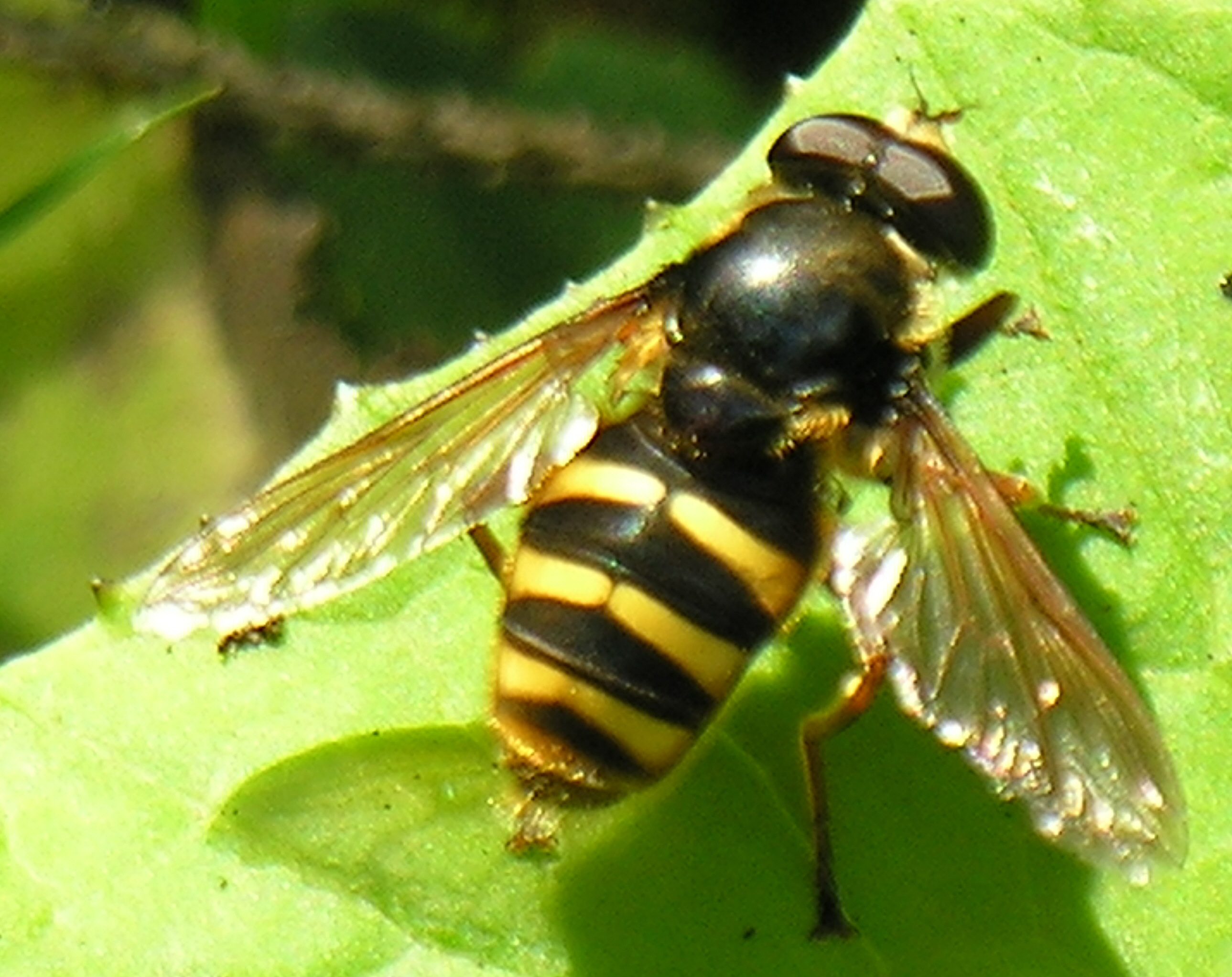
- male

Scientific classification
- Kingdom: Animalia
- Phylum: Arthropoda
- Class: Insecta
- Order: Diptera
- Family: Syrphidae
- Genus: Sericomyia
- Species: S. silentis

Binomial name
- Sericomyia silentis (Harris, 1776)

Synonyms
- Musca silentis Harris, 1776; Sericomyia borealis (Fallén, 1816); Syrphus borealis Fallén, 1816

= Sericomyia silentis =

Species of fly

Sericomyia silentis, is a species of hoverfly. It is widespread throughout the Palearctic but normally encountered in small numbers in mountain regions and moorland and bog locations.

Sericomyia silentis on flowers of thistles

== Description ==
External images For terms see Morphology of Diptera
Wing length 9 ·5–14 mm. Pregenital segment yellow. Legs yellowish, base of femorae black. Tergites 2-4 dark yellow side-stripes widen towards tergite margins. See references for determination

== Distribution ==
Palearctic Fennoscandia South to the Pyrenees. Ireland East through North Europe and Central Europe (Alps) into Russia and the Caucasus and on to Siberia, the Russian Far East and Japan.

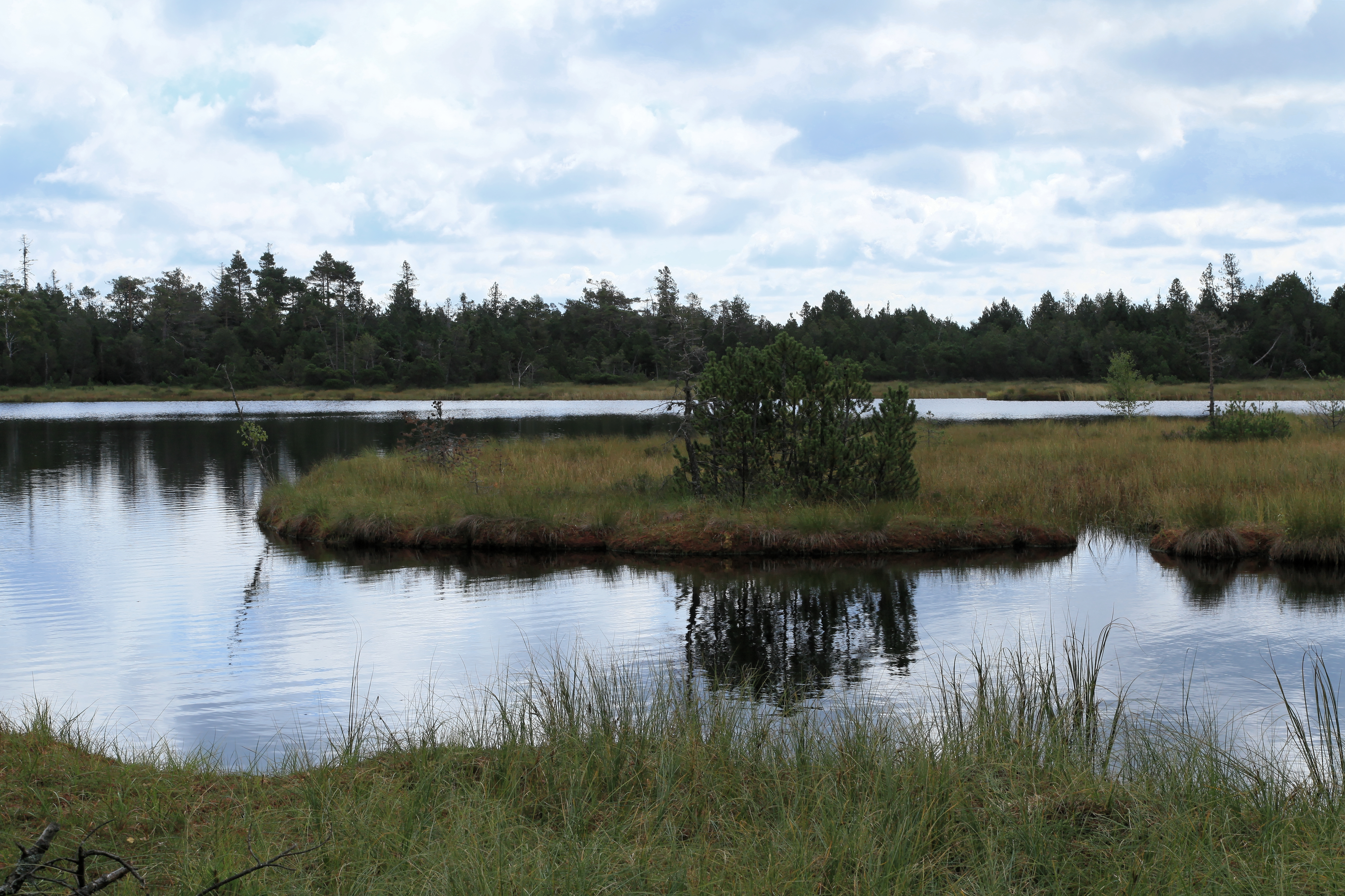
Habitat.Germany

== Biology ==
Habitat: wet moorland, valley bog, fen and Alnus, Salix carr. Flies May to October.
