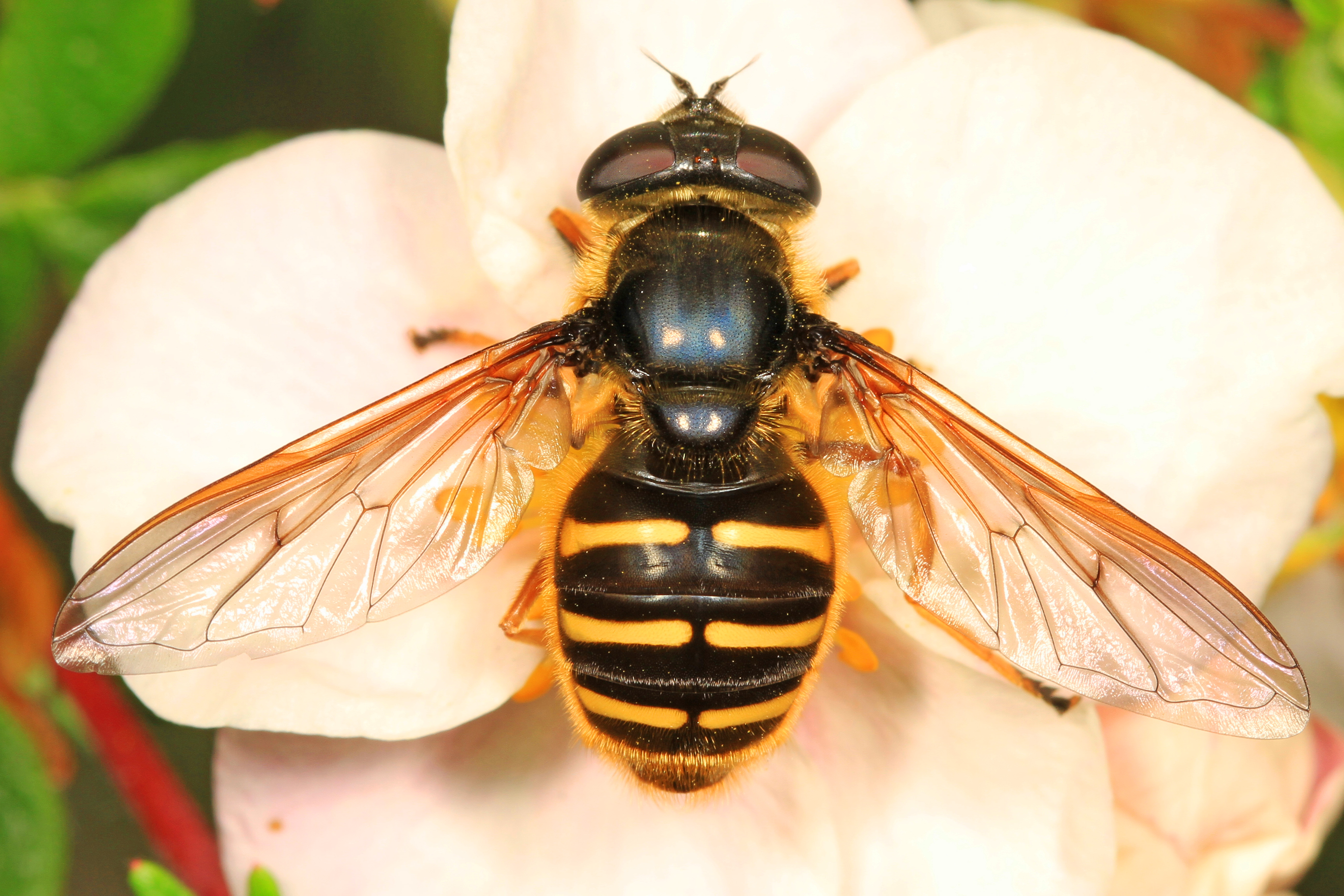

Scientific classification
- Domain: Eukaryota
- Kingdom: Animalia
- Phylum: Arthropoda
- Class: Insecta
- Order: Diptera
- Superfamily: Syrphoidea
- Family: Syrphidae
- Genus: Sericomyia
- Species: S. chalcopyga

Binomial name
- Sericomyia chalcopyga Loew, 1863

= Sericomyia chalcopyga =

Species of fly

Sericomyia chalcopyga is a species of syrphid fly in the family Syrphidae.
