= Pseudovolucella =

Scientific classification
- Kingdom: Animalia
- Phylum: Arthropoda
- Class: Insecta
- Order: Diptera
- Family: Syrphidae
- Tribe: Sericomyiini
- Genus: Pseudovolucella; Shiraki, 1930

Type species
- Pseudovolucella mimica Shiraki, 1930

Genus of flies

Pseudovolucella is a genus of hoverflies, from the family Syrphidae, in the order Diptera. They are bee mimics found mostly in the mountains of Southeast Asia.

== Species ==
- P. apiformis (De Meijere, 1919)
- P. apimima Hull, 1941
- P. decipiens (Hervé-Bazin, 1914)
- P. fasciata Curran, 1931
- P. himalayensis (Brunetti, 1907)
- P. hingstoni Coe, 1964
- P. malayana (Curran, 1928)
- P. mimica Shiraki, 1930
- P. ochracea Hull, 1944
- P. sinepollex Reemer & Hippa, 2008
