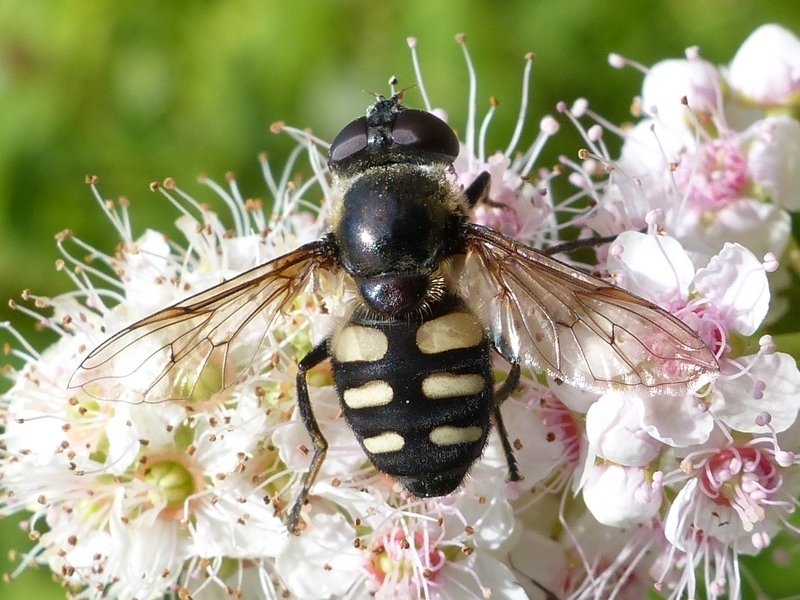

Scientific classification
- Domain: Eukaryota
- Kingdom: Animalia
- Phylum: Arthropoda
- Class: Insecta
- Order: Diptera
- Superfamily: Syrphoidea
- Family: Syrphidae
- Genus: Sericomyia
- Species: S. transversa

Binomial name
- Sericomyia transversa (Osburn, 1926)

Synonyms
- Condidea transversa Osburn, 1926

= Sericomyia transversa =

Species of fly

Sericomyia transversa (Osburn, 1926), the Yellow-spotted Pond Fly , is an uncommon species of syrphid fly observed in northeastern North America.. Hoverflies can remain nearly motionless in flight. The adults are also known as flower flies for they are commonly found on flowers, from which they get both energy-giving nectar and protein-rich pollen. The larvae of this genus are known as rat tailed maggots for the long posterior breathing tube.
