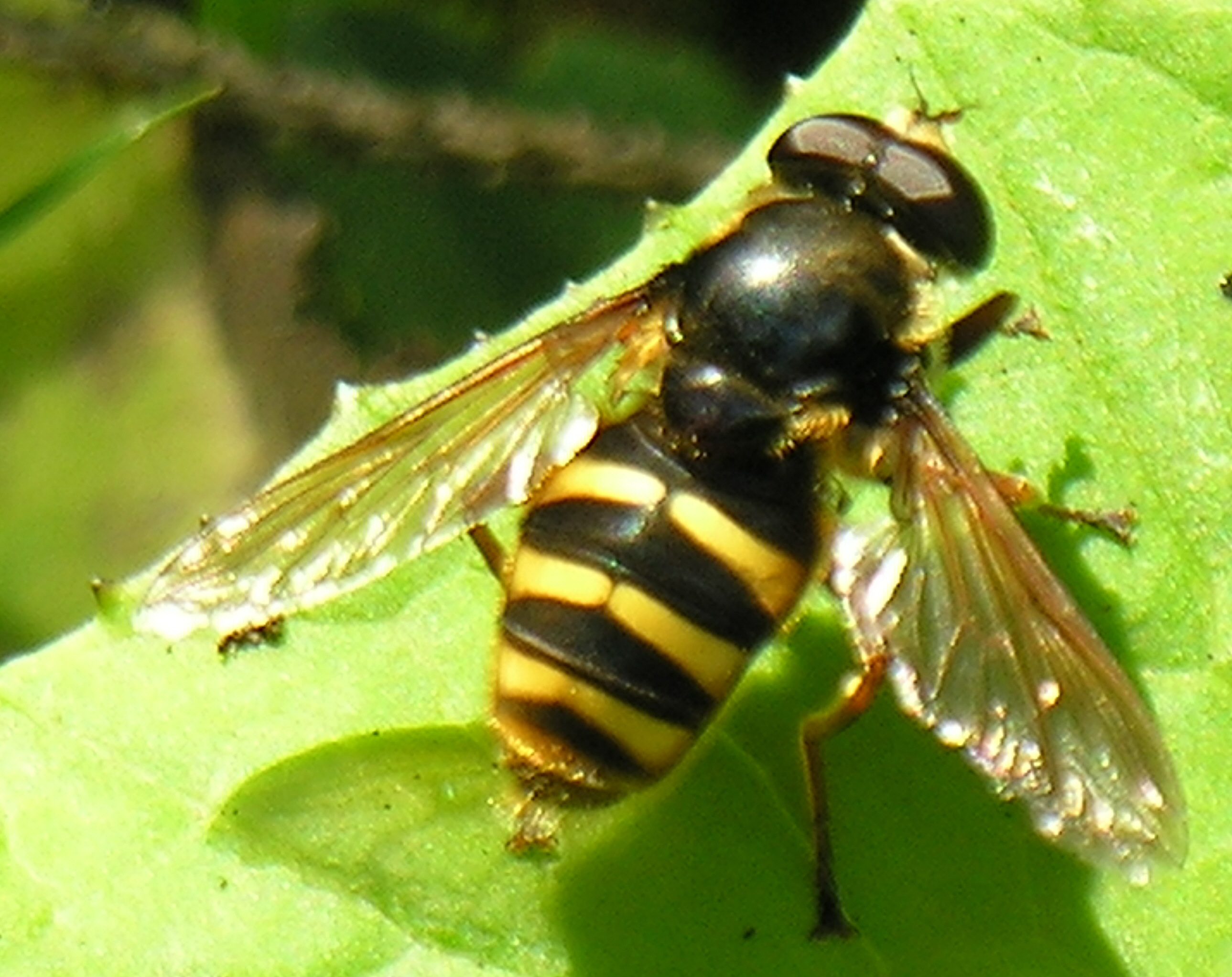
- Male Sericomyia silentis

Scientific classification
- Kingdom: Animalia
- Phylum: Arthropoda
- Class: Insecta
- Order: Diptera
- Family: Syrphidae
- Genus: Sericomyia; Meigen, 1803

Synonyms
- Cinxia Meigen, 1800; Condidea Coquillett, 1907; Sericomyza Zetterstedt, 1838

= Sericomyia =

Genus of flies

Sercomyia are large flies with species that are bee mimics both short pile and long pile. Sericomyiine flower flies are common in boreal forests across the Holarctic region and southward at higher elevations into the Oriental and Neotropical regions. Sericomyia species have larvae of the rat-tailed maggot type, often found in ponds rich in decomposing vegetation where they filter out microorganisms as their food

== Description ==
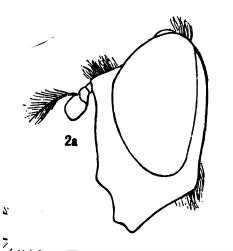
Sericomyia head, plumose arista

They have an oval flagellum with a plumose arista. The eye are bare and narrowly to broadly holoptic in male. The wings are darkly colored along the anterior margin. Cell r1 is open. The stigmatic crossvein is absent. The cell r_{4+5} with long petiole, longer than humeral crossvein. The vein _{R4+5} is straight to moderately sinuate.

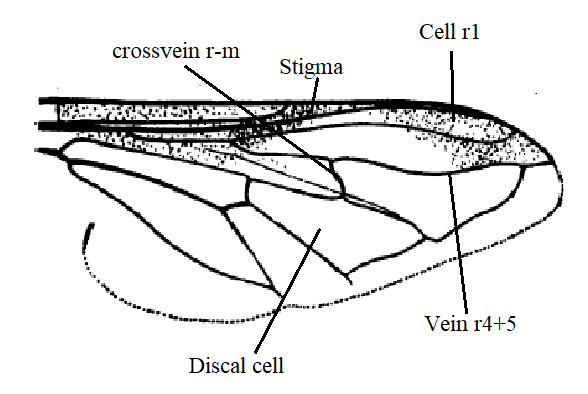
Sericomyia wing diagram

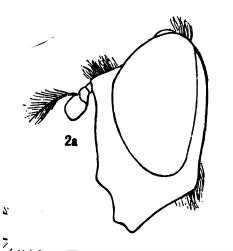
Sericomyia head, plumose arista

== Species ==
Subgenus: Sericomyia

- S. arctica Schirmer, 1913
- S. bifasciata Williston, 1887
- S. carolinensis (Metcalf, 1917)
- S. chalcopyga Loew, 1863
- S. chrysotoxoides Macquart, 1842
- S. dux (Stackelberg, 1930)
- S. hispanica Peris Torres, 1962
- S. jakutica (Stackelberg, 1927)
- S. lappona (Linnaeus, 1758)
- S. lata (Coquillett, 1907)
- S. militaris Walker, 1849
- S. nigra Portschinsky, 1873
- S. sachalinica Stackelberg, 1926
- S. sexfasciata Walker, 1849
- S. silentis (Harris, 1776)
- S. slossonae Curran, 1934
- S. transversa (Osburn, 1926)

Subgenus: Arctophila

- S. bequaerti (Hervé-Bazin, 1913)
- S. bombiformis (Fallén, 1810)
- S. flagrans (Osten Sacken, 1875)
- S. harveyi (Osburn, 1908)
- S. meyeri (Fluke, 1939)
- S. superbiens (Müller, 1776)

Subgenus: Conosyrphus

- S. tolli (Frey, 1915)

== Gallery ==
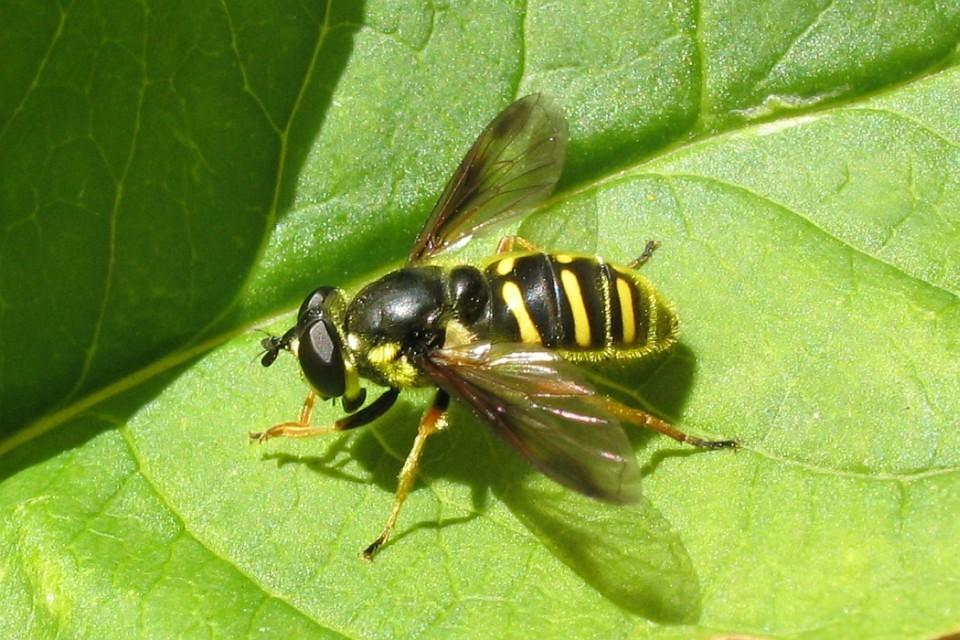
Sericomyia chrysotoxoides female

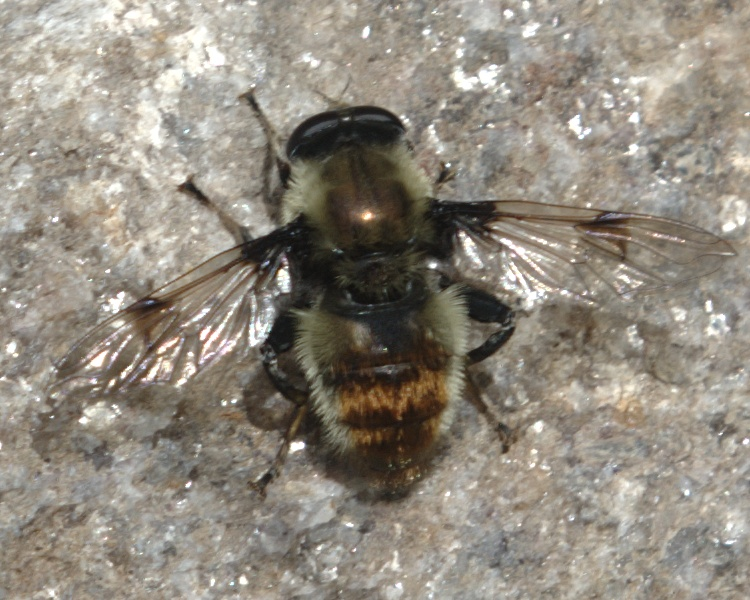
Sericomyia flagrans male

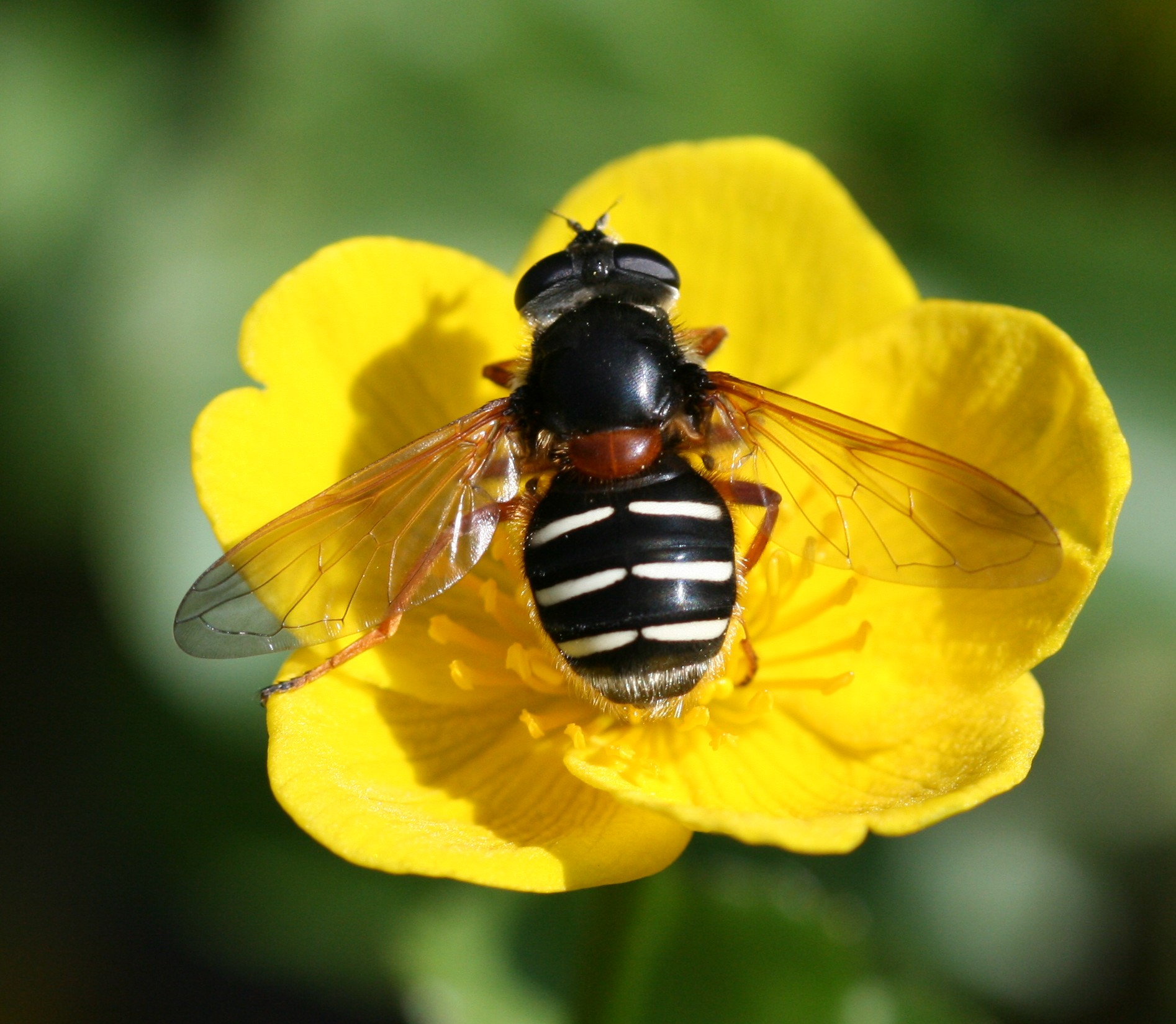
Sericomyia lappona female

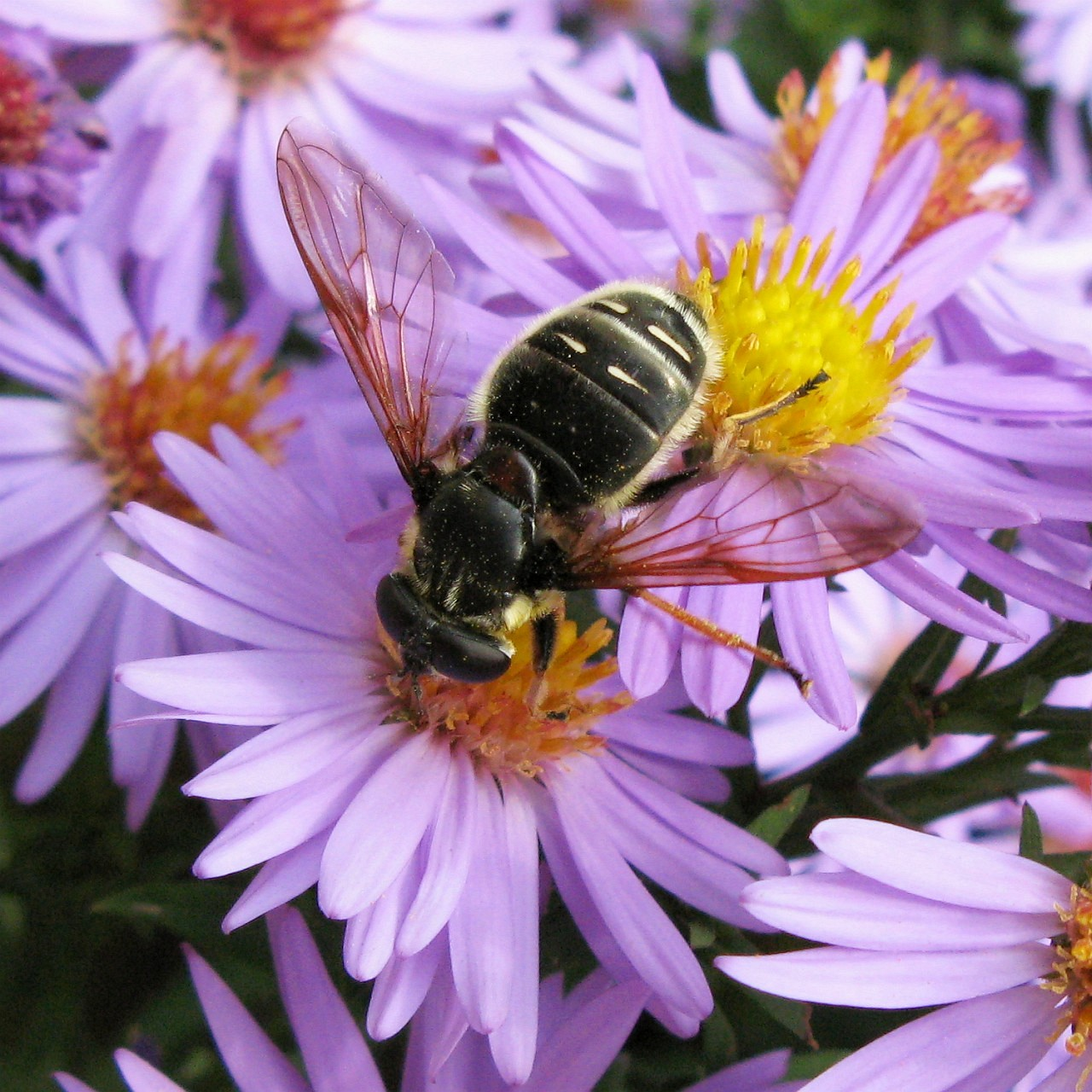
Sericomyia militaris female

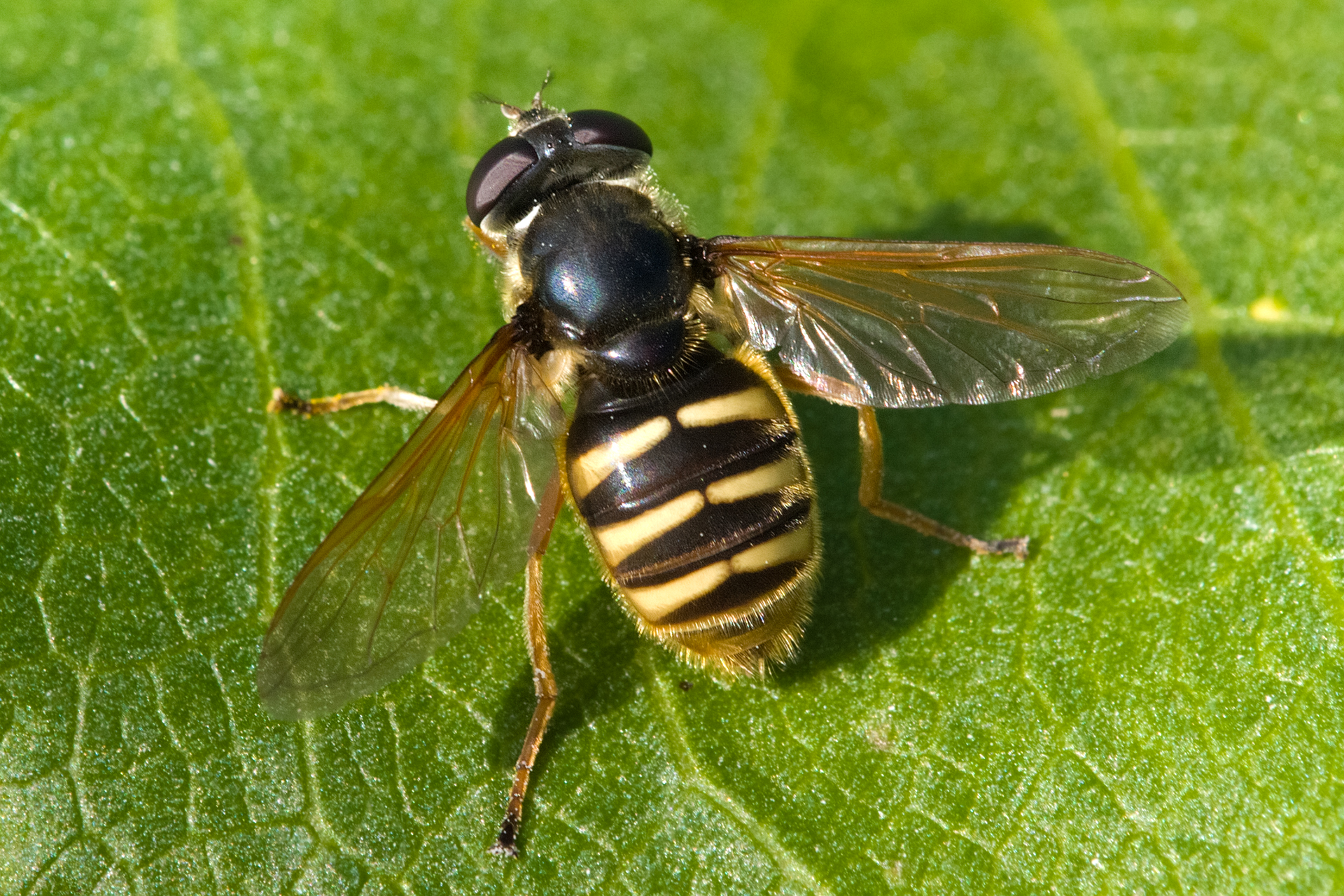
Sericomyia silentis female

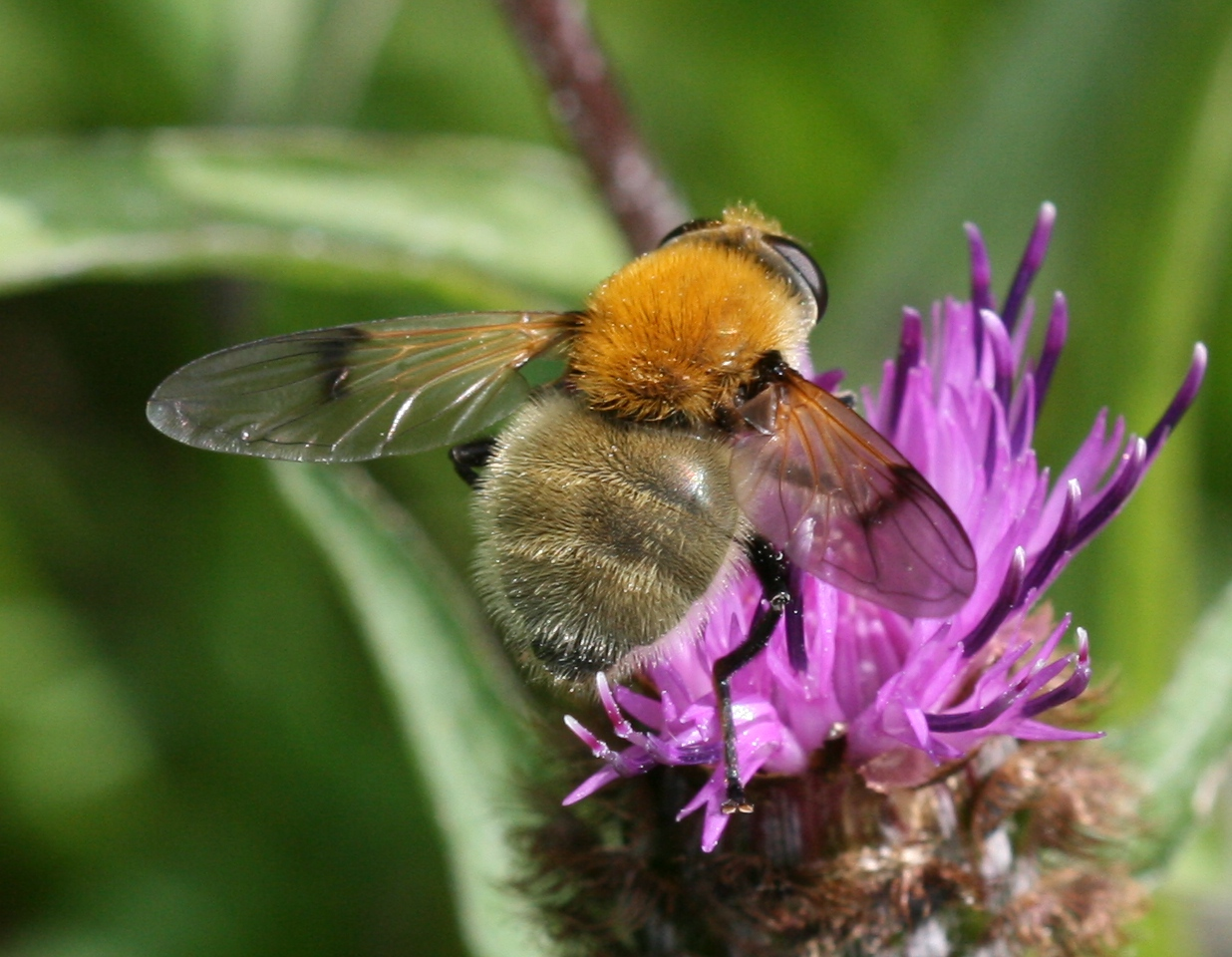
Sericomyia superbiens female
