= Sericomyia sexfasciata =

Scientific classification
- Domain: Eukaryota
- Kingdom: Animalia
- Phylum: Arthropoda
- Class: Insecta
- Order: Diptera
- Superfamily: Syrphoidea
- Family: Syrphidae
- Genus: Sericomyia
- Species: S. sexfasciata

Binomial name
- Sericomyia sexfasciata Walker, 1849

Species of fly

Sericomyia sexfasciata is a species of syrphid fly in the family Syrphidae.
