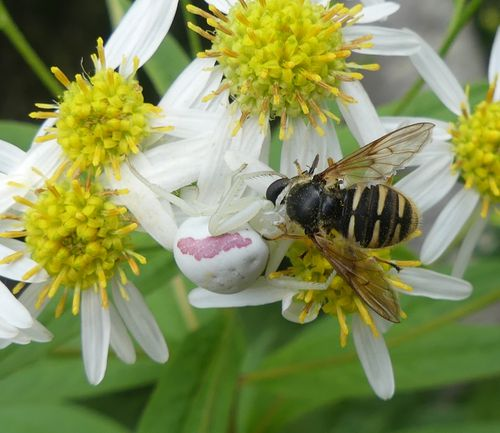
- Attacked by spider

Scientific classification
- Kingdom: Animalia
- Phylum: Arthropoda
- Class: Insecta
- Order: Diptera
- Family: Syrphidae
- Genus: Sericomyia
- Species: S. bifasciata

Binomial name
- Sericomyia bifasciata Williston, 1887

= Sericomyia bifasciata =

Species of fly

Sericomyia bifasciata (Williston, 1887), the Long-nosed Pond Fly, is an uncommon species of syrphid fly. They have been observed from the northeastern part of North America. Hoverflies get their names from the ability to remain nearly motionless while in flight. The adults are also known as flower flies for they are commonly found around and on flowers, from which they get both energy-giving nectar and protein-rich pollen. The larvae in the genus Sericomyia are known as the rat-tailed with a long breathing tube taylored for aquatic environments. The larvae for this species are unknown.

== Diagnostics ==
Flies rather short pile, not mimicking bumblebee. Yellow face with medial black stripe. Face elongate below eye by more than three-fourth height of eye. Scutellum yellow pilinose. Yellow abdominal bands, two pair in male but 3 pairs in female, finger-like and widely spaced.

== Description ==
For terms see Morphology of Diptera.

Size
Length around 11 mm.
Head
There is a central black stripe on the yellow to orange face. The gena are shining black and the distance from the eye to the bottom of the face is more than 3/4th the height of the eye. The antennae are brownish red with an elongated flagellum and a thinly plumose arista. The frons is black above the antennae and above that the black vertex has yellow pile. The eyes are bare, with the male [holoptic]and the female dichoptic. The occiput pile and pollen both yellow.
Thorax
The dorsum of thorax is shining black and, thinly pilose. On the inner side of each postpronotoum there is a spot of silvery pollen covered with yellow pile. The scutellum is black and covered with erect yellow pile. Pleurae black with areas of pale yellow pile.

general syrphid wing diagram

Wings
Wings are reddish brownish in front. The base of vein (R2+3) and the middle cross-veins, (r-m and bm-cu) are narrowly clouded with brown. Vein (R4+5) is not curved into the first posterior cell.

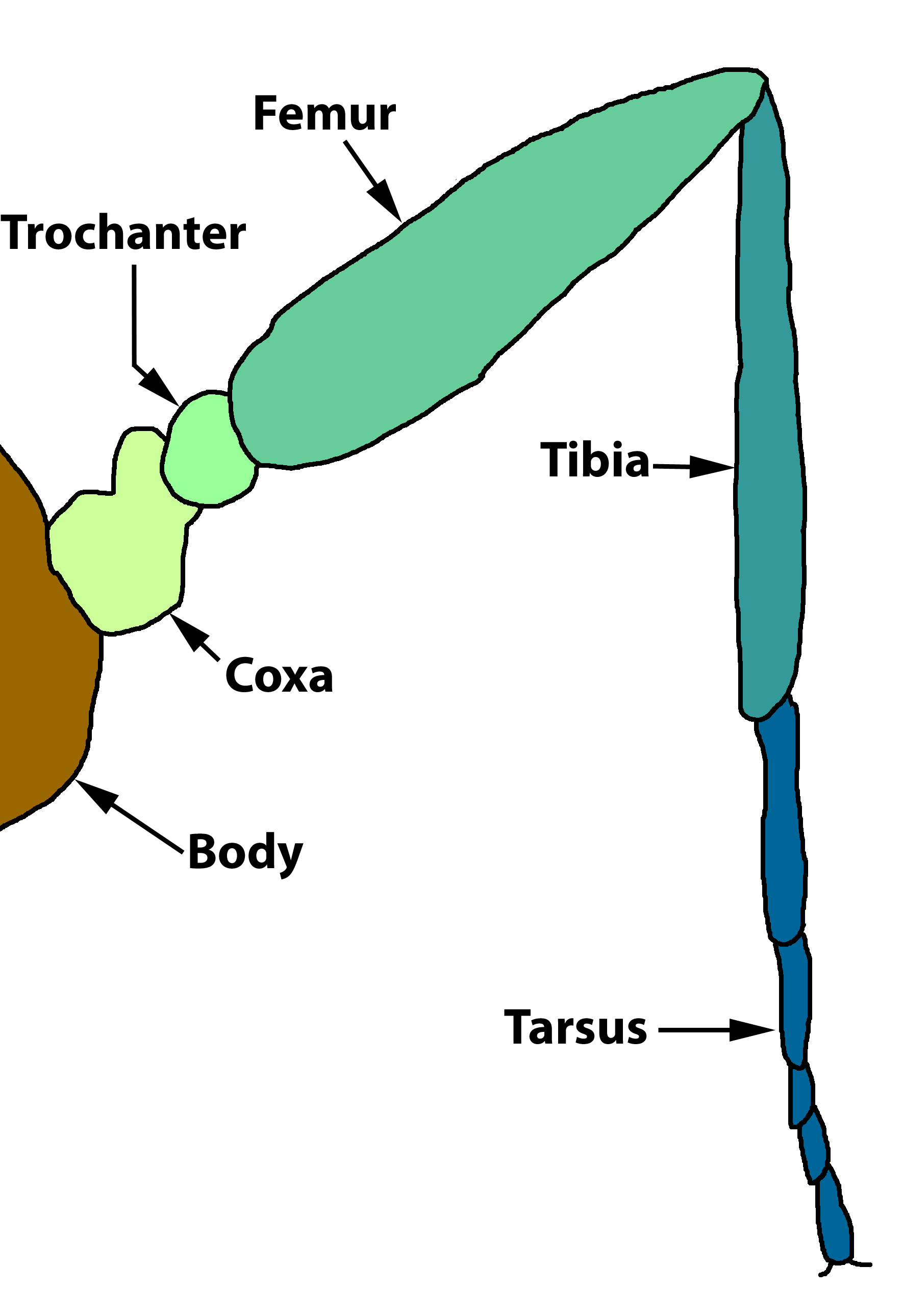
leg

Legs
The femora are black with yellow to orange apical tips. The tibia are yellow. Basitrarsi yellow, with the remaining tarsomeres black. Coxae are black.

Abdomen
The abdomen has a shining black ground color with yellow pile the longest on the anterior sides. Segments 2 and 3 in the male and 2, 3 and 4 in the female have yellow finger shaped bands. The gap between the bands is about equal to the basal width of segment 3 band.
