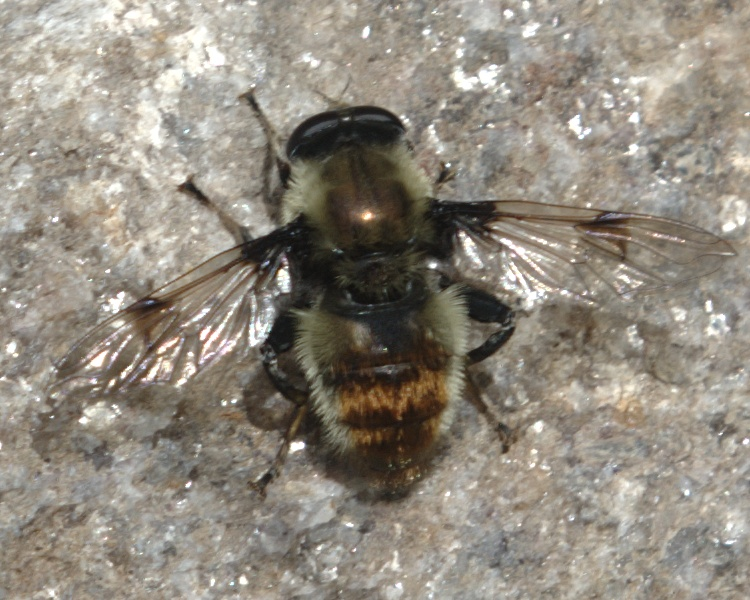
- Male

Scientific classification
- Domain: Eukaryota
- Kingdom: Animalia
- Phylum: Arthropoda
- Class: Insecta
- Order: Diptera
- Family: Syrphidae
- Genus: Sericomyia
- Subgenus: Arctophila
- Species: S. flagrans

Binomial name
- Sericomyia flagrans Osten-Sacken, 1875

Synonyms
- Arctophila flagrans; Mallota powelli

= Sericomyia flagrans =

Species of fly

Sericomyia flagrans is a North American species of flower fly.
