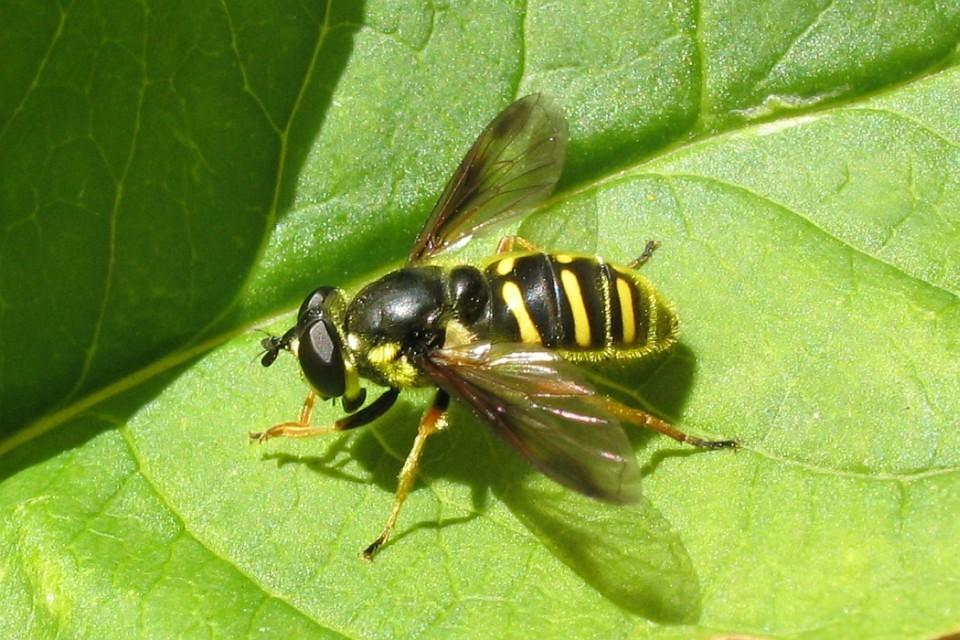
- female

Scientific classification
- Kingdom: Animalia
- Phylum: Arthropoda
- Class: Insecta
- Order: Diptera
- Family: Syrphidae
- Genus: Sericomyia
- Species: S. chrysotoxoides

Binomial name
- Sericomyia chrysotoxoides Macquart, 1842

Synonyms
- Sericomyia filia Walker, 1849; Sericomyia limbipennis Macquart, 1847; Sericomyia tuberculata Say, 1835

= Sericomyia chrysotoxoides =

Species of insect

Sericomyia chrysotoxoides , (Macquart 1842), the Oblique-banded Pond Fly , is a common species of syrphid fly observed across the eastern half of North America and in the Rocky Mountains. Syrphid flies are also known as Hover Flies or Flower Flies because the adults are frequently found hovering around flowers from which they feed on nectar and pollen. Adults are 9.6–1,315.3 mm (0.38–51.78 in) long, black with yellow bands, less prominent in the male. The larvae of this genus are known as rat tailed maggots for the long posterior breathing tube.

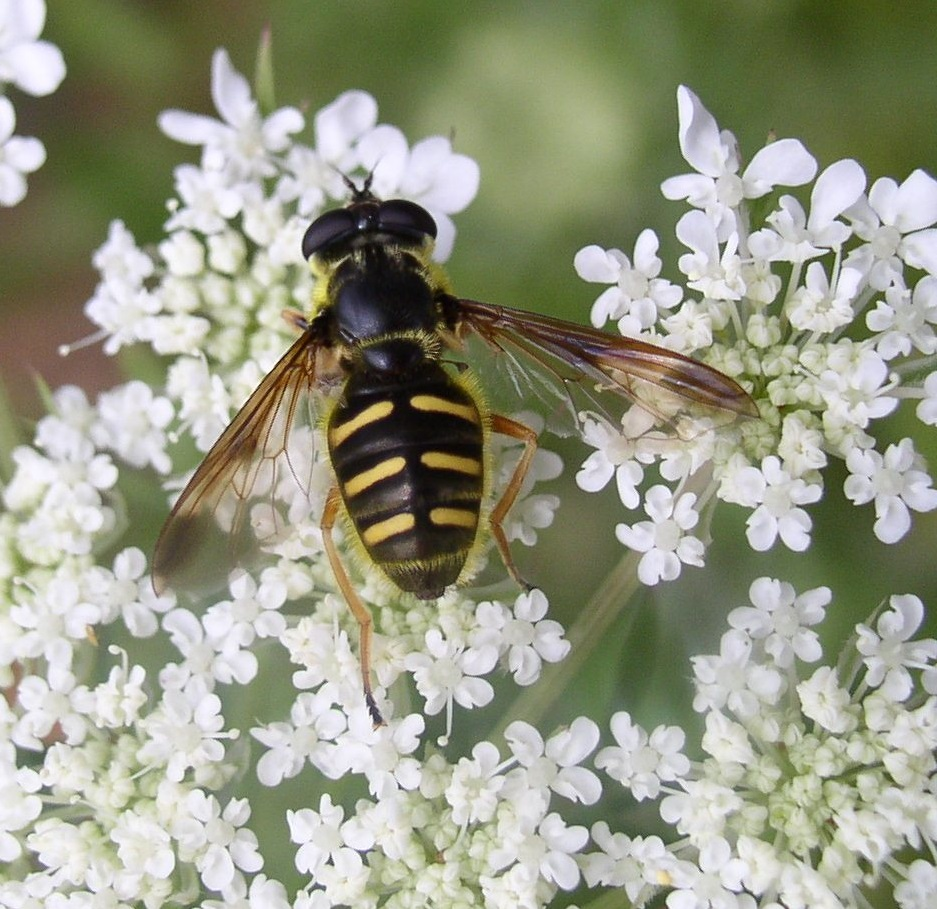
S. chrysotoxoides female
