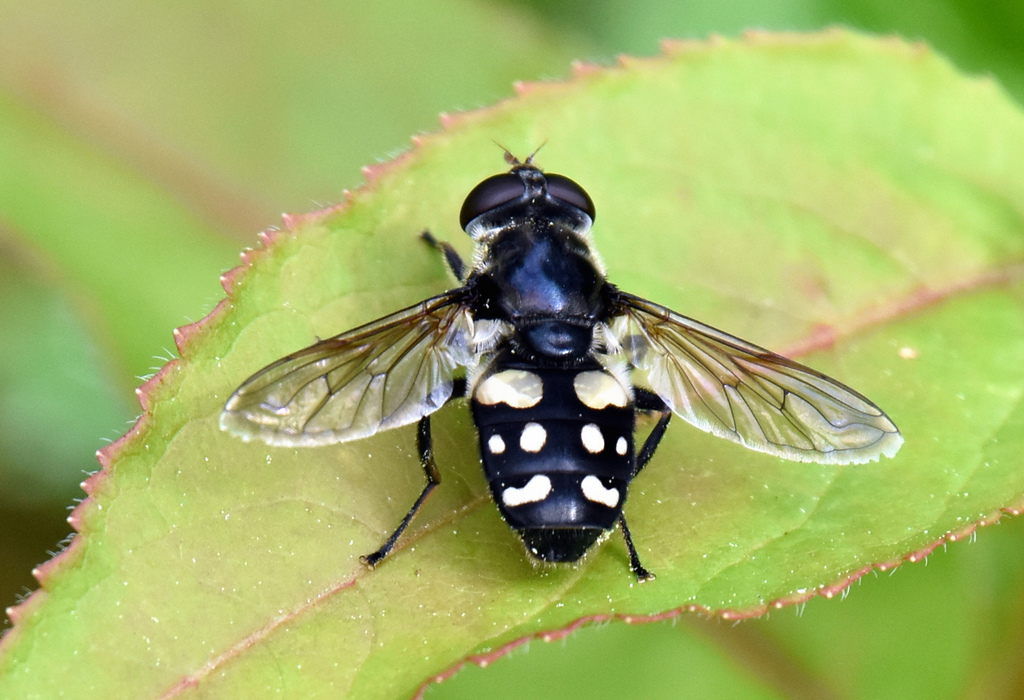

Scientific classification
- Kingdom: Animalia
- Phylum: Arthropoda
- Class: Insecta
- Order: Diptera
- Family: Syrphidae
- Genus: Sericomyia
- Species: S. lata

Binomial name
- Sericomyia lata (Coquillett, 1907)

Synonyms
- Condidea lata Coquillett, 1907

= Sericomyia lata =

Species of fly

Sericomyia lata (Coquillett 1907), the White-spotted Pond Fly , is a common species of syrphid fly observed across North America, concentrated in the east. Syrphid flies are also known as Hover Flies or Flower Flies because the adults are frequently found hovering around flowers from which they feed on nectar and pollen. Adults are 11.6–15.2 mm (0.46–0.60 in) long and black with large white abdominal spots. The larvae of this genus are known as rat tailed maggots for the long posterior breathing tube.
