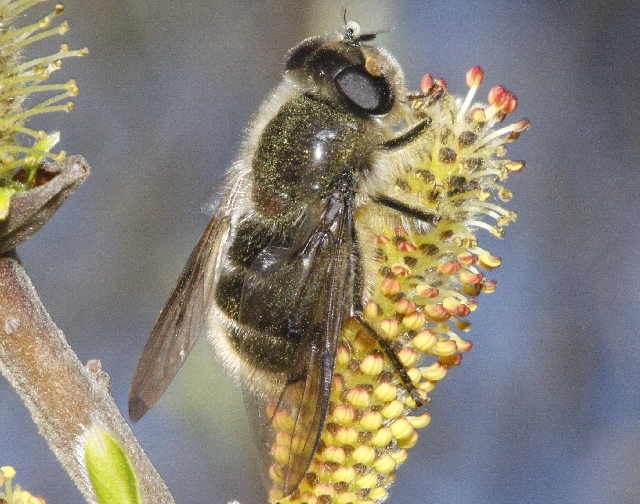

Scientific classification
- Kingdom: Animalia
- Phylum: Arthropoda
- Class: Insecta
- Order: Diptera
- Family: Syrphidae
- Tribe: Sericomyiini
- Genus: Pyritis; Hunter, 1897

= Pyritis =

Genus of flies

Pyritis is a genus of hoverfly, from the family Syrphidae, in the order Diptera.

== Species ==
- P. kincaidii (Coquillett, 1895)
