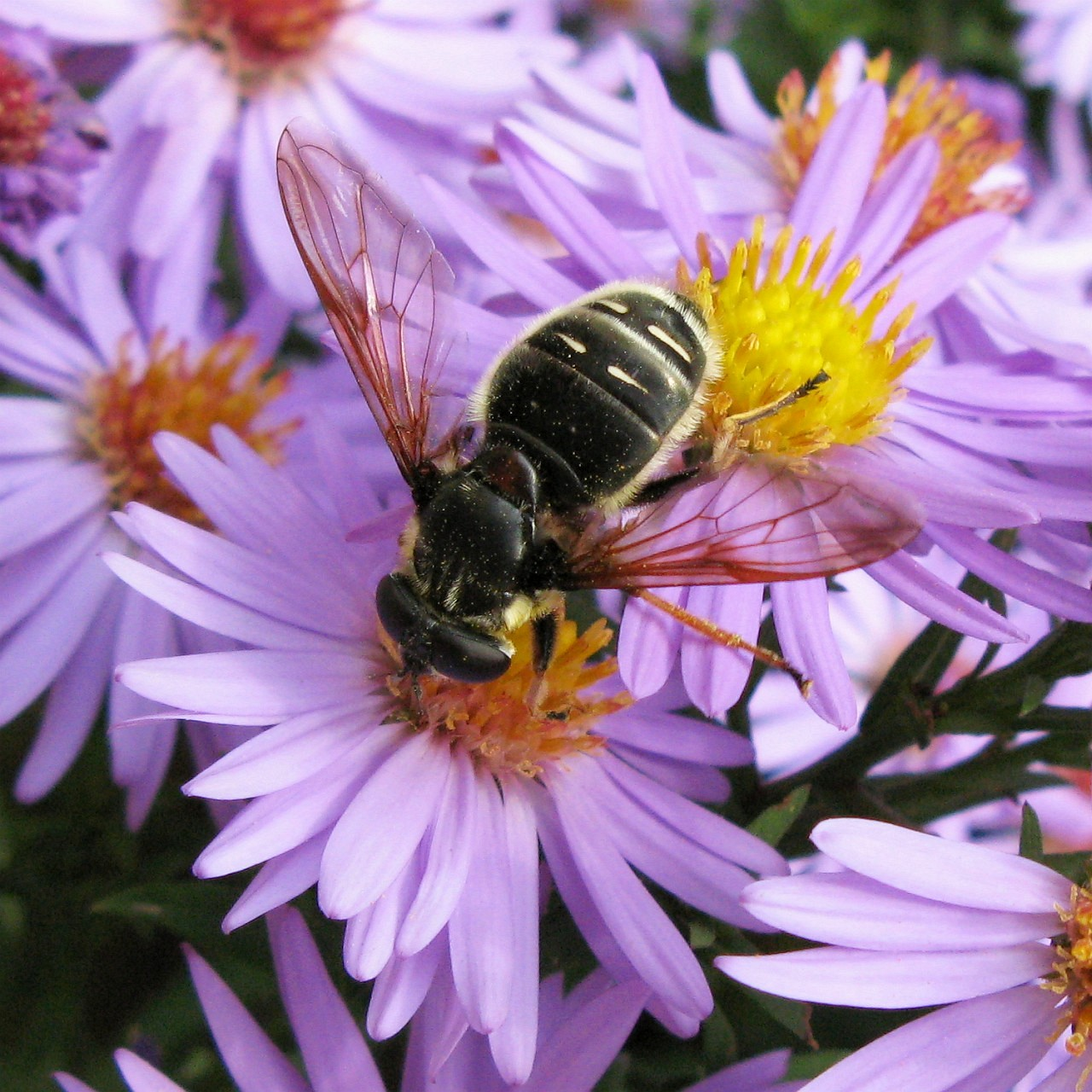
- Female

Scientific classification
- Kingdom: Animalia
- Phylum: Arthropoda
- Class: Insecta
- Order: Diptera
- Family: Syrphidae
- Genus: Sericomyia
- Species: S. militaris

Binomial name
- Sericomyia militaris Walker, 1849

Synonyms
- Milesia obliqua; Sericomyia calcarata

= Sericomyia militaris =

Species of fly

Sericomyia militaria, commonly known as the narrow-banded pond fly, is a common species of syrphid fly observed across northern North America. Syrphid flies are also known as Hover Flies or Flower Flies because the adults are frequently found hovering around flowers from which they feed on nectar and pollen. Adults are 11.7–17.1 mm (0.46–0.67 in) long, mostly black with narrow yellow abdominal markings. The larvae of this genus are known as rat tailed maggots for the long posterior breathing tube.
