= Sericomyia carolinensis =

Scientific classification
- Kingdom: Animalia
- Phylum: Arthropoda
- Class: Insecta
- Order: Diptera
- Superfamily: Syrphoidea
- Family: Syrphidae
- Genus: Sericomyia
- Species: S. carolinensis

Binomial name
- Sericomyia carolinensis Metcalf, 1917

Synonyms
- Cinxia carolinensis Metcalf, 1917

Species of fly

Sericomyia carolinensis (also called the Two-spotted Pond Fly), is a rare species in the family Syrphidae, found in the Southeastern part of the United States. It is distinguished by its all yellow face, single pair of small narrow yellow spots, and yellow pilose scutellum. Adults noted feeding on pear blossoms. The larval stage is unknown but is likely a "rat tailed" type larvae inhabiting nutrient rich waters, typical for the genus Sericomyia.

== Description ==
For terms, see Morphology of Diptera.

Size: 10–11 millimetres (0.39–0.43 in)

Head: The frons is yellow-orange immediately above the antennae. There is a black spot above that, which is more grayish towards the eyes. The vertex is dark brown. The face is completely yellow without a medial black stripe. The antennae are plumose. The eyes are bare and holoptic in males, but dichoptic in the females. The occiput has a silvery-white pollen-like covering.

Thorax: The scutum and scutellum are dark brown with yellow pile.

general syrphid wing diagram

Wings: The wings are brown at the bases and at the front edge of the wing. The vein R4+5 slightly bent into cell r4+5.

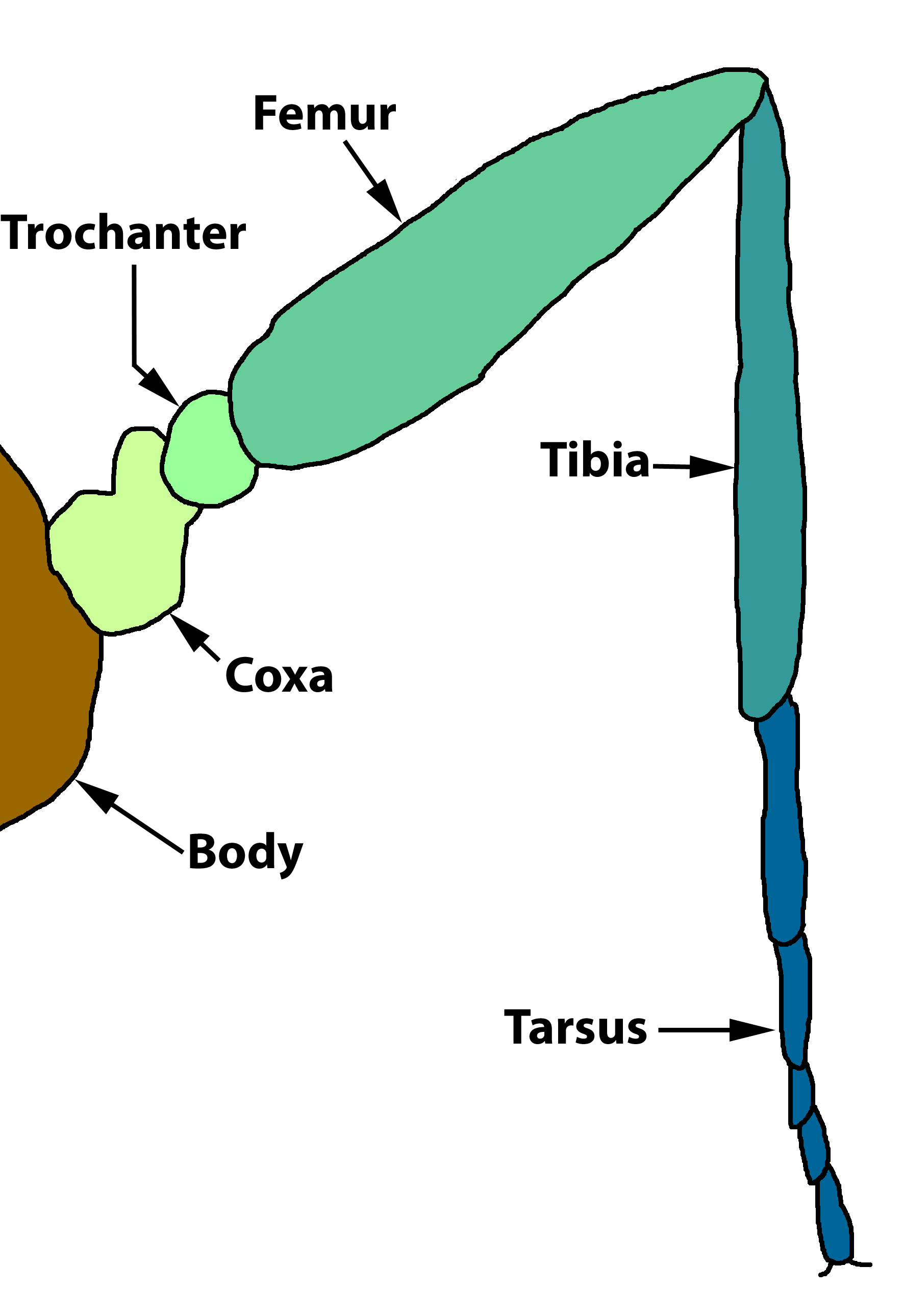
Insect leg

Legs: All basitarsi are orange to reddish-brown. The hind femur is brown with a pale apical tip. Tibia paler brown and distinctly curved.

Abdomen: Shiny black with one pair of yellow stripes on second segment. Yellow pile on the margin of abdomen, longer at the anterior.
