= Pararctophila =

Scientific classification
- Kingdom: Animalia
- Phylum: Arthropoda
- Class: Insecta
- Order: Diptera
- Family: Syrphidae
- Tribe: Sericomyiini
- Genus: Pararctophila; Herve-Bazin, 1914

Genus of flies

Pararctophila is a genus of Hoverflies, from the family Syrphidae, in the order Diptera.

== Species ==
- P. brunnescens Huo & Shi, 2007
- P. oberthueri Hervé-Bazin, 1914
