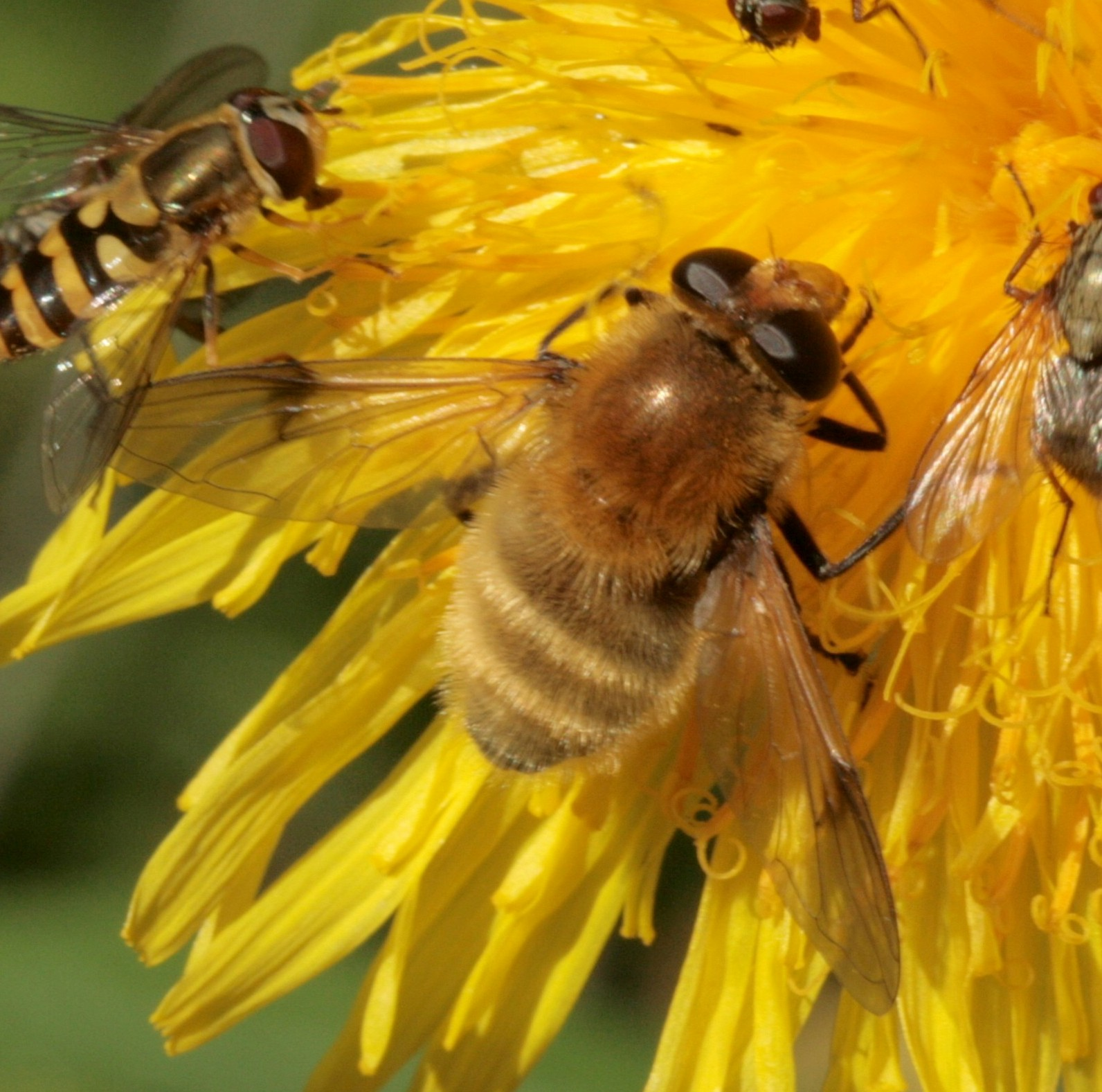
- Sericomyia superbiens female

Scientific classification
- Kingdom: Animalia
- Phylum: Arthropoda
- Clade: Pancrustacea
- Class: Insecta
- Order: Diptera
- Family: Syrphidae
- Genus: Sericomyia
- Subgenus: Arctophila
- Species: S. superbiens

Binomial name
- Sericomyia superbiens Müller, 1776

Synonyms
- Musca fulvus Harris, 1780; Syrphus mussitans Fabricius, 1777; Arctophila superbiens

= Sericomyia superbiens =

Species of fly

Sericomyia (Arctophila) superbiens is a Palearctic species of hoverfly. It is a bumblebee mimic.

Range: Scandinavia South to the Pyrenees. Ireland East through Northern Europe Central Europe and Southern Europe (Italy, Yugoslavia) into European Russia. South of northern France largely confined to mountain ranges.

It is a bumblebee mimic.

The habitat is Alnus, Quercus and Betula with Salix woodland or coniferous (Picea) woodland or amongst Alnus and Salix.Also found by springs, wet flushes and along streams in grassland. Flowers visited include white umbellifers, composites, Cirsium vulgare, Centaurea, Cirsium vulgare, Ranunculus, Rubus, Scabiosa, Succisa pratensis, Mentha aquatica, Sonchus. Flies in late summer and autumn (end July to October). The larva is probably aquatic and microphagous on debris in semi-liquid mud close to streams and springs.
