= Conosyrphus =

Scientific classification
- Kingdom: Animalia
- Phylum: Arthropoda
- Class: Insecta
- Order: Diptera
- Family: Syrphidae
- Tribe: Sericomyiini
- Genus: Conosyrphus; Frey, 1915

Type species
- Conosyrphus tolli Frey, 1915

Genus of flies

Conosyrphus is a genus of 2 species of Hoverfly, one (volucellinus) a unique endemic of the Caucasus region and the other characteristic of the Siberian arctic.

== Species ==
- Conosyrphus tolli Frey, 1915
- Conosyrphus volucellinus (Portschinsky, 1881)
