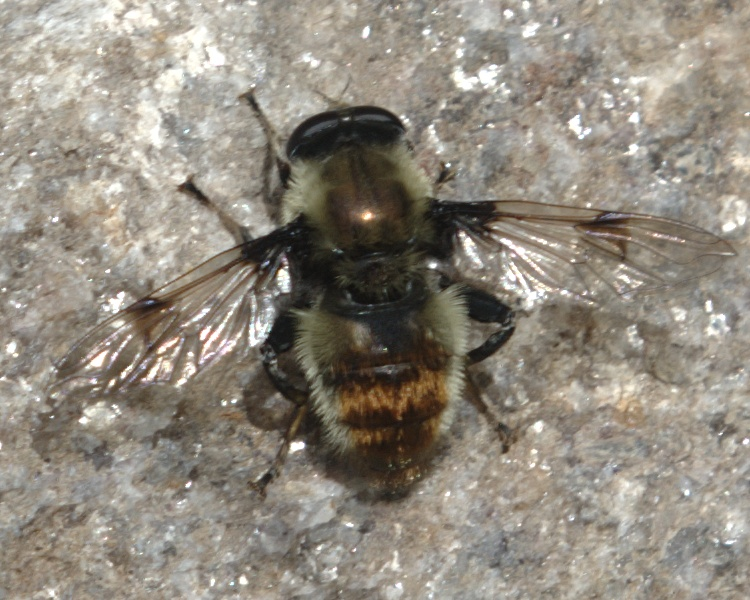
- Male Sericomyia flagrans

Scientific classification
- Domain: Eukaryota
- Kingdom: Animalia
- Phylum: Arthropoda
- Class: Insecta
- Order: Diptera
- Family: Syrphidae
- Genus: Sericomyia
- Subgenus: Arctophila; Schiner, 1860

= Arctophila (fly) =

Subgenus of flies

Arctophila is a subgenus of hoverflies, in the genus Sericomyia from the family Syrphidae, in the order Diptera, comprising several hairy, bee-mimicking species.

== Species ==
- S. bequaerti (Hervé-Bazin, 1913)
- S. bombiformis (Fallén, 1810)
- S. flagrans (Osten Sacken, 1875)
- S. harveyi (Osburn, 1908)
- S. meyeri (Fluke, 1939)
- S. superbiens (Müller, 1776)
