= List of Copestylum species =

This is a list of 332 species in the genus Copestylum.

== Copestylum species ==
- C. abdominale (Wiedemann, 1930)
- C. abrupta (Curran, 1925)
- C. acutifrons (Curran, 1939)
- C. alberlena Marcos-Garcia & Perez-Banon, 2002
- C. albertoi Marcos-Garcia & Rotheray, 2007
- C. albifrons (Curran, 1939)
- C. albitarse (Lynch Arribalzaga, 1892)
- C. alcedo (Curran, 1926)
- C. alcedoides (Curran, 1939)
- C. alchimista (Rondani, 1848)
- C. ambrosettii (Lynch Arribalzaga, 1892)
- C. amethystinum (Bigot, 1875)
- C. anastasia (Hull, 1945)
- C. anna (Williston, 1887) (Anna's bromeliad fly)
- C. apertum (Walker, 1860)
- C. apicale (Loew, 1866)
- C. apiciferum (Townsend, 1895)
- C. apicula (Curran, 1939)
- C. aricia (Curran, 1930)
- C. astarte (Hull, 1950)
- C. aster (Curran, 1939)
- C. aureum (Fluke, 1951)
- C. avidum (Osten Sacken, 1877) (yellow-spotted bromeliad fly)
- C. azureum (Philippi, 1865)
- C. azurinum (Hull, 1941)
- C. barbara Hancock & Marcos-Garcia, 2007
- C. barei (Curran, 1925) (violet bromeliad fly)
- C. bassleri (Curran, 1939)
- C. beatricea (Hull, 1950)
- C. belinda (Hull, 1949)
- C. belizensis Sedman, 1975
- C. bellulum (Williston, 1891)
- C. bequaerti Curran, 1930
- C. bimaculatum (Sack, 1941)
- C. binominatum (Goot, 1964)
- C. bipunctatum (Hull, 1941)
- C. bolivianum (Hine, 1914)
- C. boqueronense Rotheray & Marcos-Garcia, 2007
- C. bradleyi (Curran, 1925)
- C. brazilianum (Hull, 1938)
- C. breve (Giglio-Tos, 1892)
- C. brevifacies (Curran, 1926)
- C. brevivittatum (Curran, 1930)
- C. bruneri (Curran, 1939)
- C. brunneum (Thunberg, 1789)
- C. brunnicolor (Hull, 1938)
- C. brunnigaster (Hull, 1943)
- C. bulbosum (Fluke, 1951)
- C. caesariatum (Williston, 1891)
- C. calochaetum (Hull, 1941)
- C. camposi (Curran, 1939)
- C. capensis (Schiner, 1868)
- C. carlosii Rotheray & Hancock, 2007
- C. caudatum Curran, 1927 (hairy-horned bromeliad fly)
- C. chaetogaster (Hull, 1943)
- C. chaetophorum (Williston, 1887)
- C. chalybescens (Wiedemann, 1830)
- C. chapadense (Curran, 1930)
- C. cinctiventre (Curran, 1930)
- C. circe (Curran, 1939)
- C. circumdatum (Walker, 1857)
- C. circumscriptum (Curran, 1939)
- C. claripenne (Curran, 1925)
- C. clarum (Hull, 1942)
- C. cochabamba Rotheray & Hancock, 2009
- C. cockerelli (Curran, 1927)
- C. colombiense Thompson, 1976
- C. compactum (Curran, 1925)
- C. comstocki (Williston, 1887) (Comstock's bromeliad fly)
- C. conabioi Marcos-Garcia & Rotheray, 2007
- C. concinnum (Philippi, 1865)
- C. conifacium (Hull, 1943)
- C. contumax (Curran, 1939)
- C. cordiae (Townsend, 1897)
- C. correctum (Curran, 1927)
- C. corumbense (Curran, 1930)
- C. craverii (Giglio-Tos, 1892)
- C. crepuscularium (Hull, 1942)
- C. cruciatum (Hull, 1943)
- C. cubomaculatum (Hull, 1937)
- C. cupricolor (Hull, 1948)
- C. curiosum (Curran, 1939)
- C. currani (Fluke, 1951)
- C. cyanescens (Macquart, 1842)
- C. cyanoprora (Curran, 1939)
- C. delila (Hull, 1950)
- C. dichroicum (Giglio-Tos, 1892)
- C. dimorphium (Curran, 1939)
- C. discale (Curran, 1926)
- C. dispar (Macquart, 1846)
- C. dorsale (Wiedemann, 1830)
- C. duida (Curran, 1930)
- C. elizabethae Hancock & Rotheray, 2007
- C. emeralda (Hull, 1944)
- C. emilia (Curran, 1939)
- C. escomeli (Curran, 1929)
- C. eugenia (Williston, 1887)
- C. exeugenia (Curran, 1953)
- C. externum (Curran, 1939)
- C. flavipenne (Wiedemann, 1830)
- C. flavissimum (Giglio-Tos, 1892)
- C. flaviventre (Macquart, 1846)
- C. florella (Hull, 1944)
- C. florida (Hull, 1941) (Florida bromeliad fly)
- C. flukei (Curran, 1936)
- C. fornax (Townsend, 1895)
- C. fractum (Curran, 1926)
- C. fraudulentum (Williston, 1891)
- C. frauenfeldi (Schiner, 1868)
- C. frontale (Sack, 1941)
- C. fulvicorne (Bigot, 1883)
- C. fulvolucens (Walker, 1852)
- C. fulvonotatum (Bigot, 1875)
- C. fumipenne (Sack, 1941)
- C. fumosum (Hull, 1943)
- C. furens (Giglio-Tos, 1892)
- C. galantei Marcos-Garcia & Rotheray, 2007
- C. gelenitae Marcos-Garcia & Rotheray, 2007
- C. gertschi (Curran, 1939)
- C. gibberum (Schiner, 1868)
- C. gorgon (Hull, 1950)
- C. granulatum (Hull, 1944)
- C. guianicum (Hine, 1914)
- C. haagii (Jaennicke, 1867) (Haag's bromeliad fly)
- C. hambletoni (Fluke, 1951)
- C. hidalgense Rotheray & Hancock, 2009
- C. hirtipes (Macquart, 1850)
- C. hispaniolae Thompson, 1981
- C. horticole (Hull, 1943)
- C. horvathi (Szilády, 1926)
- C. hoya (Curran, 1947)
- C. hyalinipenne (Hull, 1944)
- C. hyalopterum (Giglio-Tos, 1892)
- C. hydrofenestra (Hull, 1943)
- C. hystrix (Giglio-Tos, 1892)
- C. imitans (Curran, 1926)
- C. impressum (Hull, 1949)
- C. inconsistens (Curran, 1939)
- C. infractum Thompson, 1981
- C. inquisitor (Hull, 1943)
- C. integrum (Walker, 1857)
- C. intona (Curran, 1928)
- C. isabellina (Williston, 1887) (Isabelle's bromeliad fly)
- C. joei Rotheray & Hancock, 2007
- C. johnsoni (Curran, 1925)
- C. kahli (Hull, 1938)
- C. lacticoeruleum (Hull, 1944)
- C. lanei (Curran, 1936)
- C. latevitatum (Curran, 1939)
- C. latum (Wiedemann, 1830)
- C. lentum Williston, 1887
- C. limbipenne Williston, 1887
- C. liriope (Hull, 1949)
- C. longirostre (Macquart, 1846)
- C. louisae Hancock & Rotheray, 2007
- C. lucilia (Hull, 1950)
- C. lugens (Wiedemann, 1830)
- C. lumina (Hull, 1937)
- C. lunuliferum (Hull, 1937)
- C. macquarti (Curran, 1926)
- C. macrocephalum (Giglio-tos, 1892)
- C. macrorhinum (Bigot, 1875)
- C. macula (Wiedemann, 1830)
- C. maculoides (Curran, 1939)
- C. mamorum Rotheray & Marcos-Garcia, 2007
- C. marceli (Curran, 1939)
- C. marginatum (Say, 1829)
- C. megacephalum (Loew, 1863)
- C. melleum (Jannicke, 1867)
- C. meretricias (Williston, 1888)
- C. metallorum (Walker, 1852)
- C. mexicanum (Macquart, 1842) (Mexican cactus fly)
- C. milae Rotheray & Hancock, 2009
- C. minimum (Giglio-Tos, 1892)
- C. missionera (Lynch Arribalzaga, 1892)
- C. mocanum (Curran, 1936)
- C. morpho (Curran, 1939)
- C. multipunctatum Rotheray & Hancock, 2009
- C. musanum (Curran, 1930)
- C. muscarium (Thomson, 1869)
- C. musicanum (Curran, 1930)
- C. mustoides (Curran, 1927)
- C. nautlanum (Townsend, 1897)
- C. neosplendens Thompson, 1976
- C. neotropicum Thompson, 1976
- C. nigriceps (Schiner, 1868)
- C. nigrifacies (Bigot, 1875)
- C. nigripes (Bigot, 1857)
- C. nigropodum (Hull, 1949)
- C. nigroviride (Hull, 1949)
- C. nitidigaster (Hull, 1937)
- C. notatum (Bigot, 1875)
- C. obliquicorne (Curran, 1939)
- C. obscurior (Curran, 1939)
- C. obscuripenne (Lynch Arribalzaga, 1892)
- C. oestroides (Hull, 1943)
- C. omochroma (Giglio-Tos, 1892)
- C. opalescens (Townsend, 1901)
- C. opalicolor (Hull, 1943)
- C. opalina (Wiedemann, 1830)
- C. opeostoma (Hull, 1949)
- C. opinator (Williston, 1891)
- C. ornatum (Williston, 1891)
- C. osburni (Hull, 1942)
- C. oscillans Hancock & Rotheray, 2007
- C. otongaensis Rotheray & Hancock, 2007
- C. pachecoi (Curran, 1939)
- C. pallens (Wiedemann, 1830)
- C. pallidithorax (Hull, 1941)
- C. pallisteri (Curran, 1953)
- C. palmyra (Hull, 1949)
- C. panamense (Curran, 1930)
- C. panamenum (Curran, 1939)
- C. parana (Hull, 1942)
- C. parina (Fluke, 1951)
- C. parvum (Rondani, 1848)
- C. pectorale (Rondani, 1863)
- C. persimile (Williston, 1888)
- C. pertinax (Hull, 1950)
- C. peruvianum (Vimmer & Soukup, 1938)
- C. pica (Schiner, 1868)
- C. pictum (Wiedemann, 1830)
- C. picturatum (Lynch Arribalzaga, 1892)
- C. pinkusi (Curran, 1938)
- C. placivum (Hull, 1943)
- C. plaumanni (Curran, 1939)
- C. plorans (Rondani, 1848)
- C. posticum (Say, 1829)
- C. prasinus (Schiner, 1868)
- C. prescutellare (Williston, 1888)
- C. procteri (Curran, 1939)
- C. profaupar Marinoni, 2004
- C. pseudopallens Thompson, 1981
- C. pseudotachina (Hull, 1936)
- C. pubescens (Loew, 1861)
- C. pulchripes (Bigot, 1875)
- C. pulchrum (Williston, 1891)
- C. punctiferum (Bigot, 1875)
- C. punctigena (Hull, 1937)
- C. purpurascens (Loew, 1869)
- C. purpureum (Walker, 1849)
- C. purpuriferum (Bigot, 1875)
- C. pusillum (Macquart, 1842)
- C. puyarum Rotheray & Hancock, 2007
- C. quadratum (Williston, 1891)
- C. rafaelanum (Townsend, 1897)
- C. rectifacies Thompson, 1981
- C. rectum (Wulp, 1882)
- C. rhea (Hull, 1950)
- C. robustum (Sack, 1941)
- C. roraima (Curran, 1939)
- C. rosa (Curran, 1939)
- C. rospigliosii (Brethes, 1920)
- C. rufitarse Thompson, 1976
- C. rufoscutellare (Philippi, 1865)
- C. rurale (Curran, 1939)
- C.santarosae Rotheray & Hancock, 2009
- C. saphirinum (Bigot, 1883)
- C. sappho (Hull, 1949)
- C. satur (Osten Sacken, 1877) (spotted-wing bromeliad fly)
- C. schwarzi Curran, 1935
- C. scintillans (Hull, 1949)
- C. scutellatum (Macquart, 1842)
- C. selectum (Curran, 1939)
- C. sexmaculatum (Palisot de Beauvois, 1819) (six-spotted bromeliad fly)
- C. sica (Curran, 1953)
- C. simile Giglio-Tos, 1892
- C. smithae (Thompson, 1965)
- C. soror (Bigot, 1883)
- C. spectrale (Hull, 1942)
- C. spinigerum (Wiedemann, 1830)
- C. spinithorax (Lynch Arribalzaga, 1892)
- C. splendens (Townsend, 1897)
- C. squamigerum (Curran, 1925)
- C. sternale (Curran, 1930)
- C. stigmatum (Hull, 1949)
- C. subcoeruleum (Rondani, 1863)
- C. submetallicum (Rondani, 1848)
- C. subrostratum (Rondani, 1848)
- C. sultzi (Curran, 1939)
- C. tacanense Rotheray & Hancock, 2007
- C. tapanti Rotheray & Hancock, 2007
- C. tapia Rotheray & Hancock, 2007
- C. tatei (Curran, 1930)
- C. teffera (Curran, 1939)
- C. tetetzoi Rotheray & Hancock, 2009
- C. tibiale (Macquart, 1846)
- C. tricinctum (Bigot, 1875)
- C. trifascium (Walker, 1857)
- C. tripunctatum (Hull, 1949)
- C. trituberculatum Thompson, 1976
- C. triunfense Hancock, 2007
- C. trivittatum Thompson, 1988
- C. truncatum Rotheray & Hancock, 2009
- C. tumicephalum (Hull, 1943)
- C. tympanitis (Fabricius, 1805)
- C. ulrica (Hull, 1950)
- C. umamas Hancock & Rotheray, 2007
- C. unicolor (Curran, 1925)
- C. unilectum (Walker, 1860)
- C. vacuum (Fabricius, 1775)
- C. vagum (Wiedemann, 1830)
- C. valeria (Hull, 1944)
- C. vampyrum (Hull, 1942)
- C. varians (Bigot, 1875)
- C. varichaetum (Curran, 1925)
- C. variegatum (Bigot, 1875)
- C. ventana (Fluke, 1951)
- C. vera (Hull, 1942)
- C. verdigaster (Hull, 1943)
- C. vesicularium (Curran, 1947) (irridescent bromeliad fly)
- C. vicinum (Bigot, 1883)
- C. victoria (Williston, 1887) (Victoria's bromeliad fly)
- C. vierecki (Curran, 1925)
- C. villarica (Fluke, 1951)
- C. viola (Hull, 1944)
- C. violaceum (Say, 1829) (purple bromeliad fly)
- C. virescens (Williston, 1891)
- C. viridana (Townsend, 1897)
- C. viride (Williston, 1888)
- C. viridigaster (Hull, 1943)
- C. viridula (Walker, 1860)
- C. vitifacium (Hull, 1943)
- C. vitrea (Hull, 1949)
- C. vitripenne (Curran, 1930)
- C. vittatum Thompson, 1976 (striped bromeliad fly)
- C. vittifacies (Hull, 1943)
- C. volcanorum Hancock & Rotheray, 2007
- C. volucelloides (Bigot, 1884)
- C. volucre (Giglio-Tos, 1892)
- C. vulcan (Hull, 1942)
- C. vulta (Fluke, 1951)
- C. willinki (Fluke, 1951)
- C. wulpi (Goot, 1964)
- C. xalapensis Rotheray & Marcos-Garcia, 2007
- C. xipe (Hull, 1942)
- C. yowoi Rotheray & Hancock, 2007
- C. yura (Curran, 1930)
