= Copestylum anna =

Scientific classification
- Kingdom: Animalia
- Phylum: Arthropoda
- Class: Insecta
- Order: Diptera
- Family: Syrphidae
- Genus: Copestylum
- Species: C. anna

Binomial name
- Copestylum anna (Williston, 1887)

Synonyms
- Volucella anna Williston, 1887

Species of fly

Copestylum anna, or Anna's bromeliad fly, is a species of syrphid fly in the family Syrphidae.
