= Copestylum caudatum =

Scientific classification
- Kingdom: Animalia
- Phylum: Arthropoda
- Class: Insecta
- Order: Diptera
- Family: Syrphidae
- Genus: Copestylum
- Species: C. caudatum

Binomial name
- Copestylum caudatum Curran, 1927

Species of fly

Copestylum caudatum, the hairy-horned bromeliad fly, is a species of syrphid fly in the family Syrphidae.

== Distribution ==
Central Western North America.
