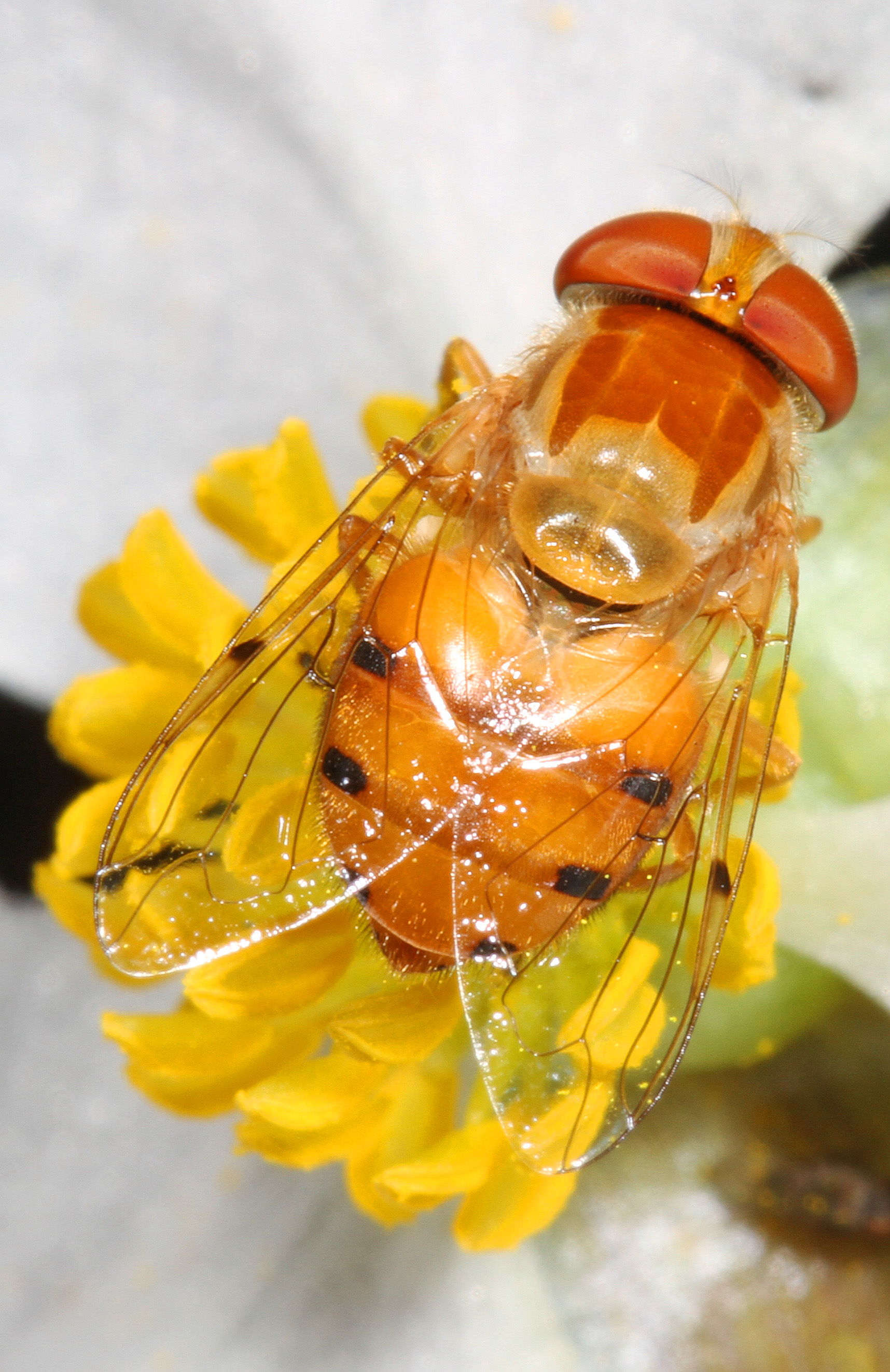

Scientific classification
- Kingdom: Animalia
- Phylum: Arthropoda
- Class: Insecta
- Order: Diptera
- Family: Syrphidae
- Genus: Copestylum
- Species: C. sexmaculatum

Binomial name
- Copestylum sexmaculatum (Palisot de Beauvois, 1819)

Synonyms
- Syrphus sexmaculatum Palisot de Beauvois, 1819; Volucella sexpunctata Loew, 1861

= Copestylum sexmaculatum =

Species of fly

Copestylum sexmaculatum, the six-spotted bromeliad fly, is a species of syrphid fly in the family Syrphidae.

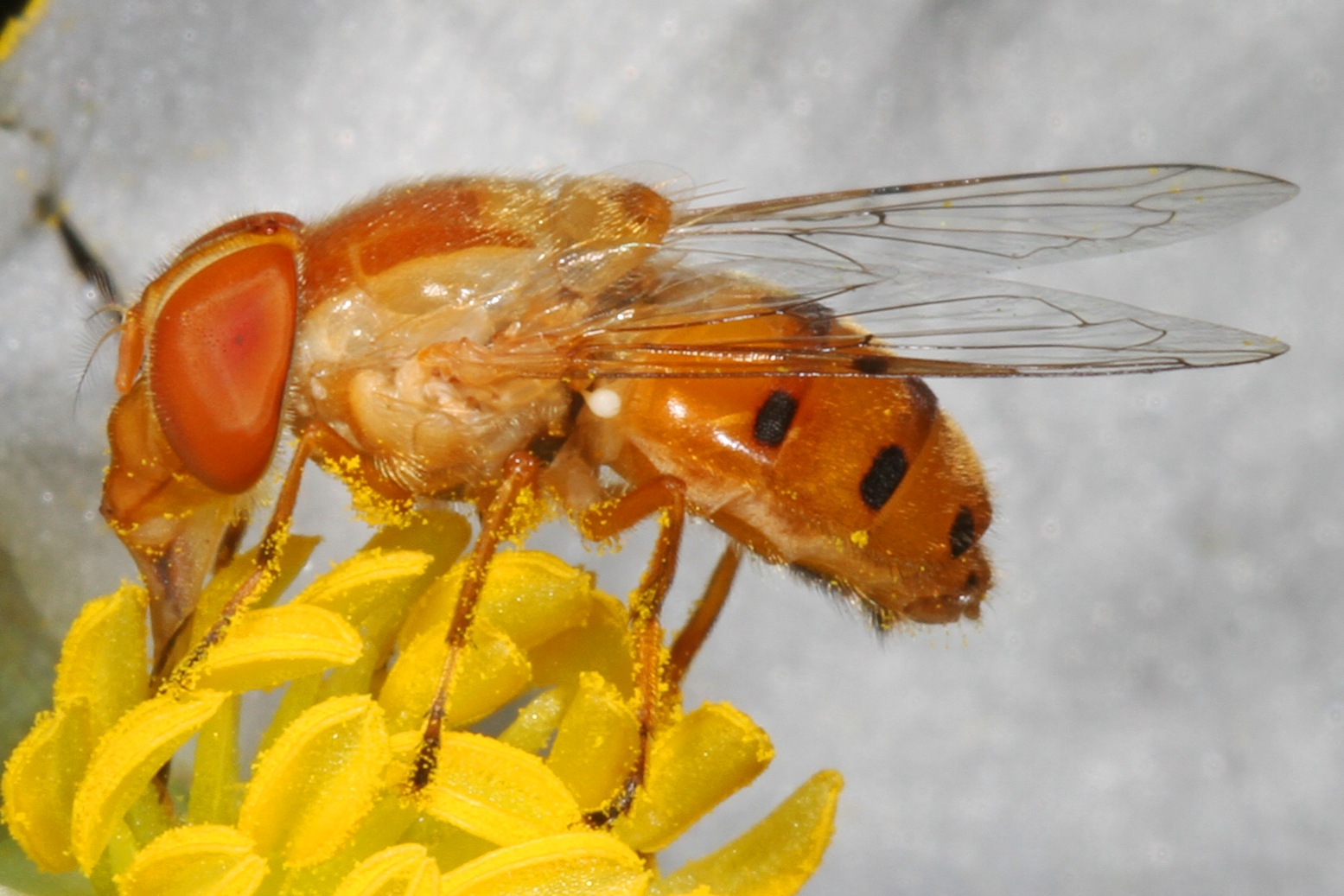
Six-spotted bromeliad fly, Copestylum sexmaculatum
