= Copestylum comstocki =

Scientific classification
- Kingdom: Animalia
- Phylum: Arthropoda
- Class: Insecta
- Order: Diptera
- Family: Syrphidae
- Genus: Copestylum
- Species: C. comstocki

Binomial name
- Copestylum comstocki (Williston, 1887)

Synonyms
- Volucella comstocki Williston, 1887

Species of fly

Copestylum comstocki, or Comstock's bromeliad fly, is a species of syrphid fly in the family Syrphidae.

== Distribution ==
South Central North America
