= Copestylum apiciferum =

Scientific classification
- Domain: Eukaryota
- Kingdom: Animalia
- Phylum: Arthropoda
- Class: Insecta
- Order: Diptera
- Family: Syrphidae
- Genus: Copestylum
- Species: C. apiciferum

Binomial name
- Copestylum apiciferum (Townsend, 1895)

Synonyms
- Volucella apiciferum Townsend, 1895; Volucella clarki Curran, 1930

Species of fly

Copestylum apiciferum is a species of syrphid fly in the family Syrphidae.
