= Copestylum florida =

Scientific classification
- Kingdom: Animalia
- Phylum: Arthropoda
- Class: Insecta
- Order: Diptera
- Family: Syrphidae
- Genus: Copestylum
- Species: C. florida

Binomial name
- Copestylum florida (Hull, 1941)

Synonyms
- Volucella florida Hull, 1941

Species of fly

Copestylum florida is a species in the family Syrphidae ("syrphid flies"), in the order Diptera ("flies"). The species is known generally as the Florida bromeliad fly.

== Distribution ==
Florida, North Carolina, South Carolina.
