= Copestylum lentum =

Scientific classification
- Kingdom: Animalia
- Phylum: Arthropoda
- Class: Insecta
- Order: Diptera
- Family: Syrphidae
- Genus: Copestylum
- Species: C. lentum

Binomial name
- Copestylum lentum Williston, 1887

Species of fly

Copestylum lentum is a species of syrphid fly in the family Syrphidae They have been observed in California, Colorado, New Mexico, Arizona, Texas and Mexico.
