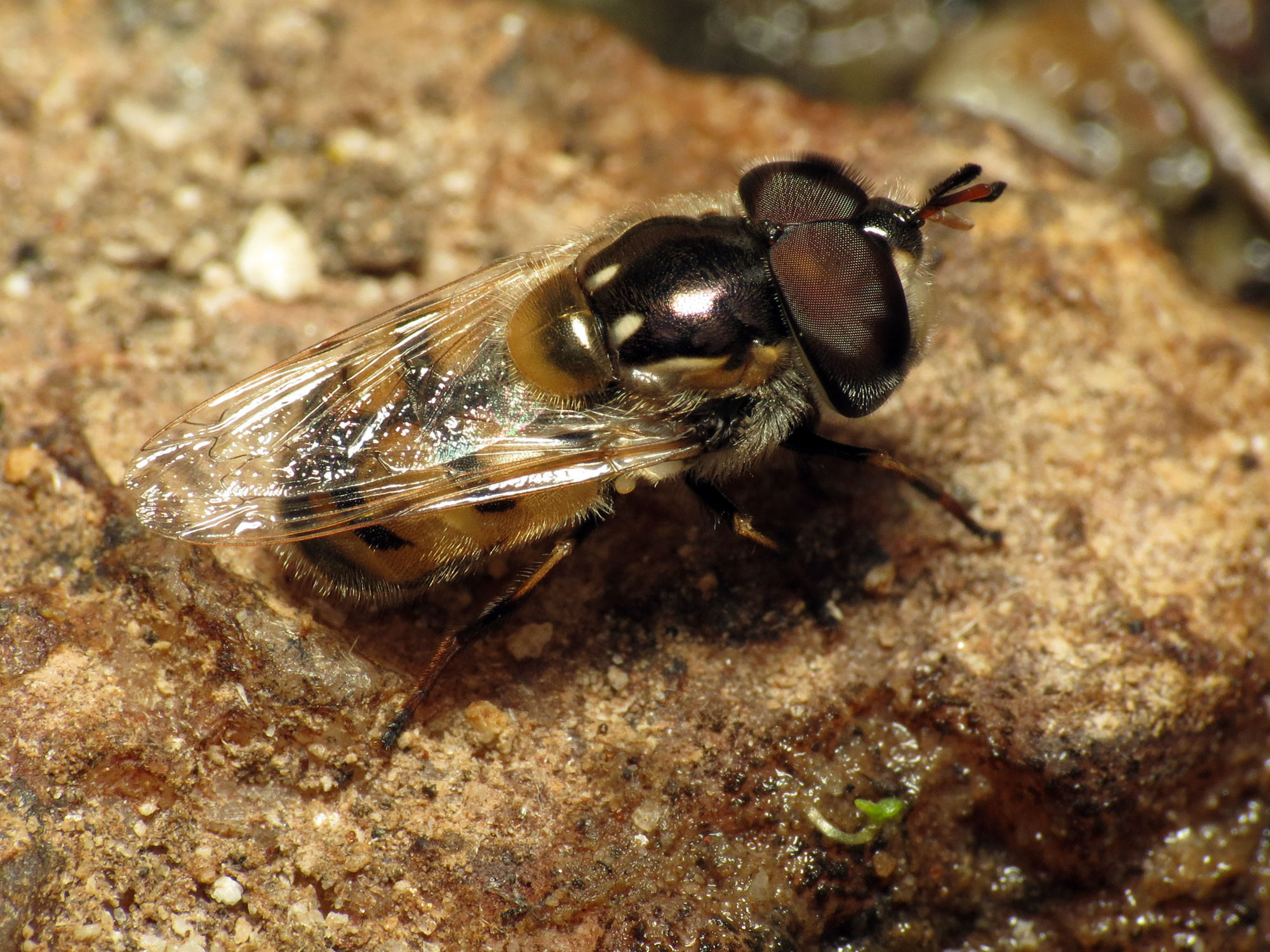

Scientific classification
- Kingdom: Animalia
- Phylum: Arthropoda
- Class: Insecta
- Order: Diptera
- Family: Syrphidae
- Genus: Copestylum
- Species: C. marginatum

Binomial name
- Copestylum marginatum (Say, 1829)

Synonyms
- Volucella fax Townsend, 1895; Volucella inops Townsend, 1895; Volucella marginatum Say, 1829; Volucella tolteca Townsend, 1895

= Copestylum marginatum =

Species of fly

Copestylum marginatum is a species of syrphid fly in the family Syrphidae. This species has been observed in Southwestern North America.

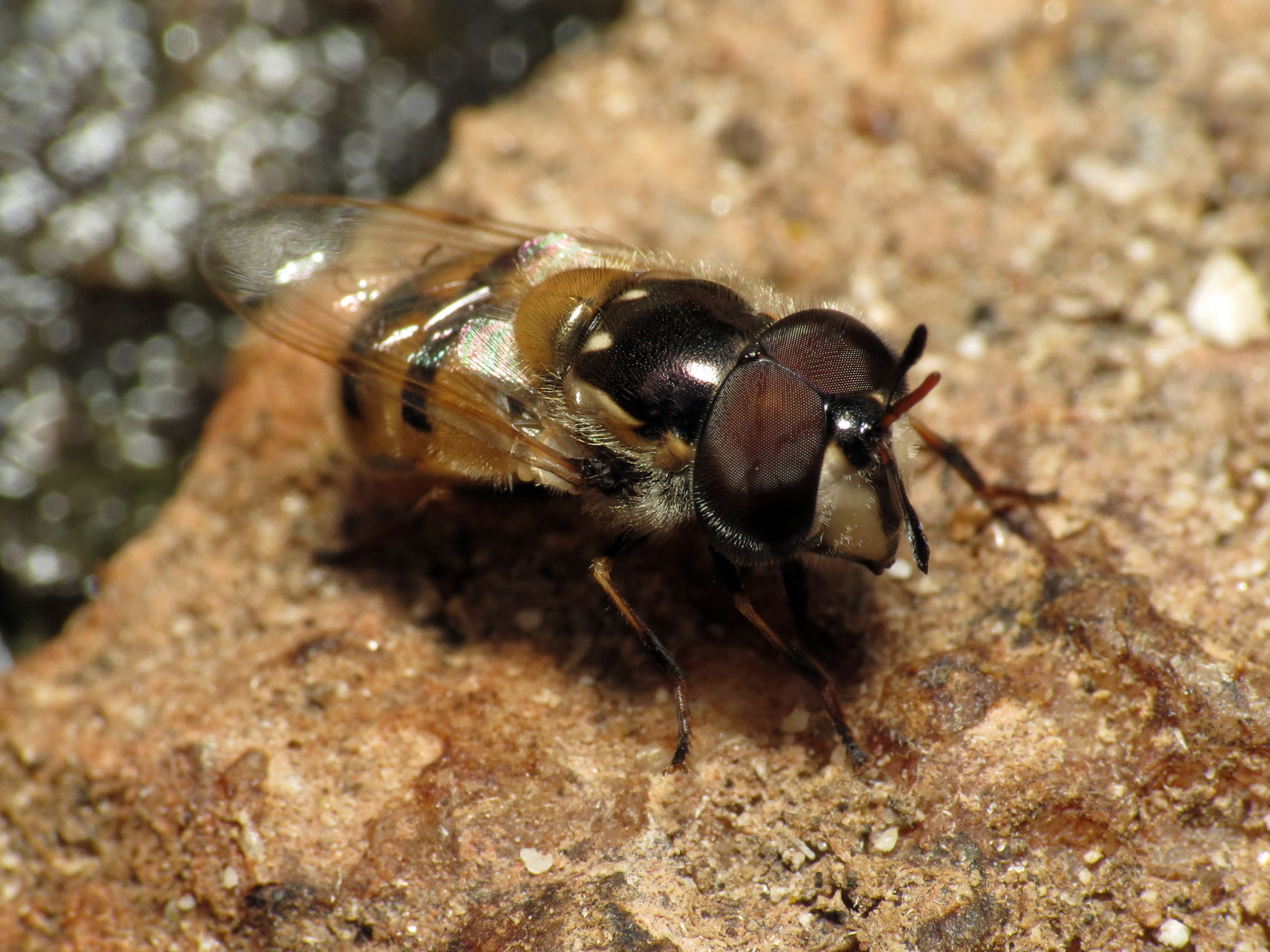
