= Copestylum satur =

Scientific classification
- Kingdom: Animalia
- Phylum: Arthropoda
- Class: Insecta
- Order: Diptera
- Family: Syrphidae
- Genus: Copestylum
- Species: C. satur

Binomial name
- Copestylum satur (Osten Sacken, 1877)

Synonyms
- Volucella satur Osten Sacken, 1877; Volucella tau Bigot, 1883

Species of fly

Copestylum satur, the spotted-wing bromeliad fly, is a species of syrphid fly in the family Syrphidae.
