= Copestylum isabellina =

Scientific classification
- Kingdom: Animalia
- Phylum: Arthropoda
- Class: Insecta
- Order: Diptera
- Family: Syrphidae
- Genus: Copestylum
- Species: C. isabellina

Binomial name
- Copestylum isabellina (Williston, 1887)

Synonyms
- Volucella isabellina Williston, 1887

Species of fly

Copestylum isabellina, or Isabelle's bromeliad fly, is a species of syrphid fly in the family Syrphidae.They have been observed in the Southwestern North America.
