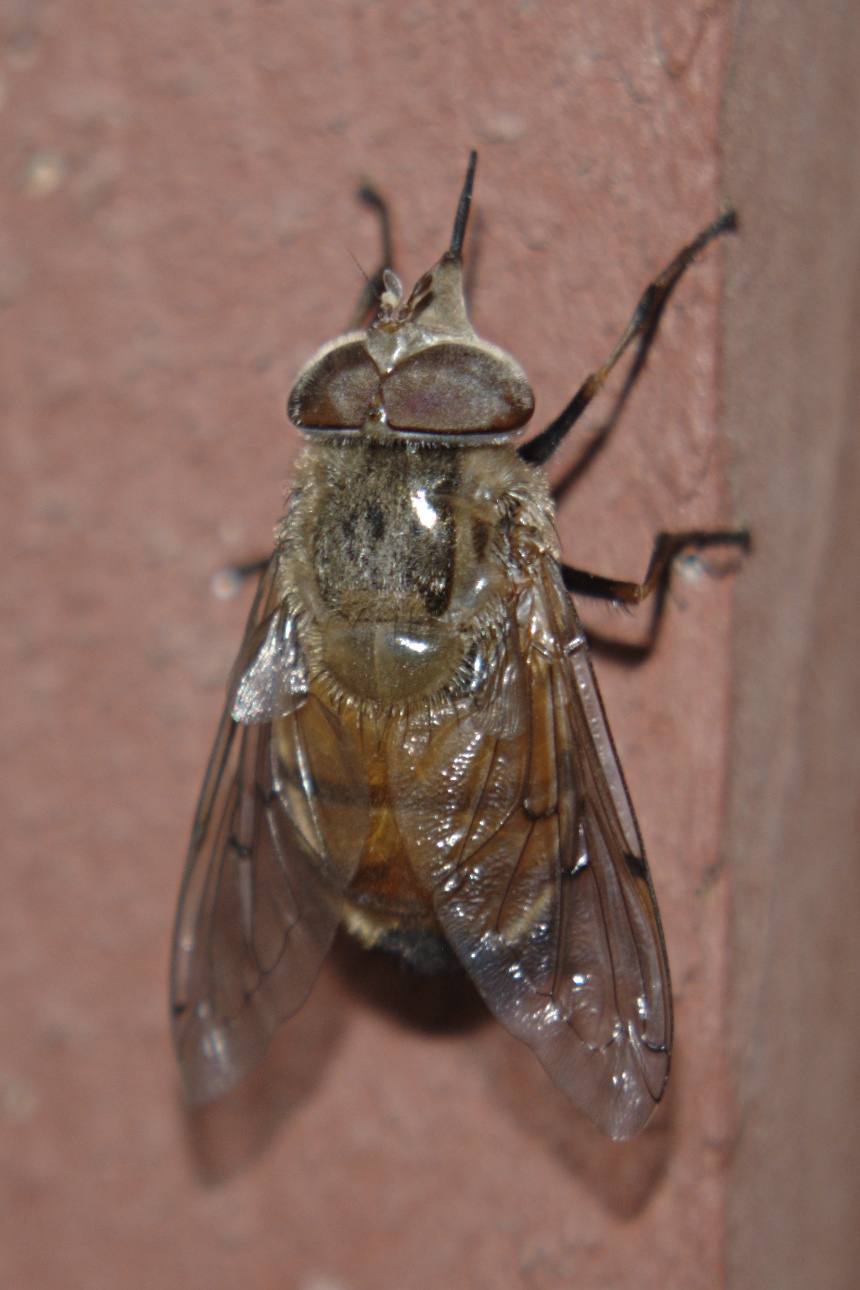

Scientific classification
- Kingdom: Animalia
- Phylum: Arthropoda
- Class: Insecta
- Order: Diptera
- Family: Syrphidae
- Genus: Copestylum
- Species: C. haagii

Binomial name
- Copestylum haagii (Williston, 1867)

Synonyms
- Temnocera setigera Osten Sacken, 1877; Volucella haagi Jaennicke, 1867; Volucella hagii Williston, 1887

= Copestylum haagii =

Species of fly

Copestylum haagii, or Haag's bromeliad fly, is a species of syrphid fly in the family Syrphidae. They have been found in Western North America.
