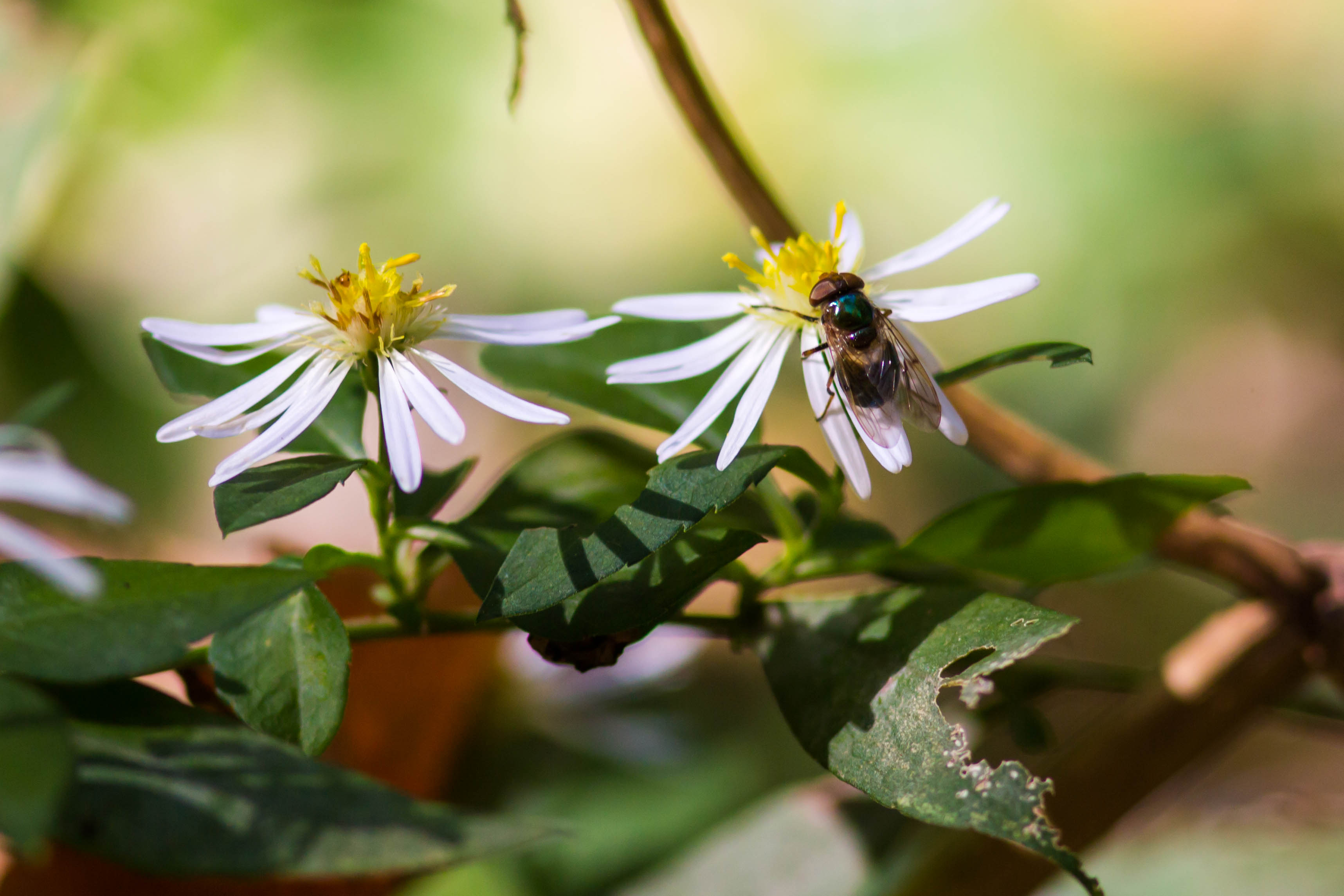

Scientific classification
- Kingdom: Animalia
- Phylum: Arthropoda
- Class: Insecta
- Order: Diptera
- Family: Syrphidae
- Genus: Copestylum
- Species: C. barei

Binomial name
- Copestylum barei (Curran, 1925)

Synonyms
- Volucella barei Curran, 1925

= Copestylum barei =

Species of fly

Copestylum barei, the violet bromeliad fly, is a species of syrphid fly in the family Syrphidae.

== Distribution ==
Western North America.
