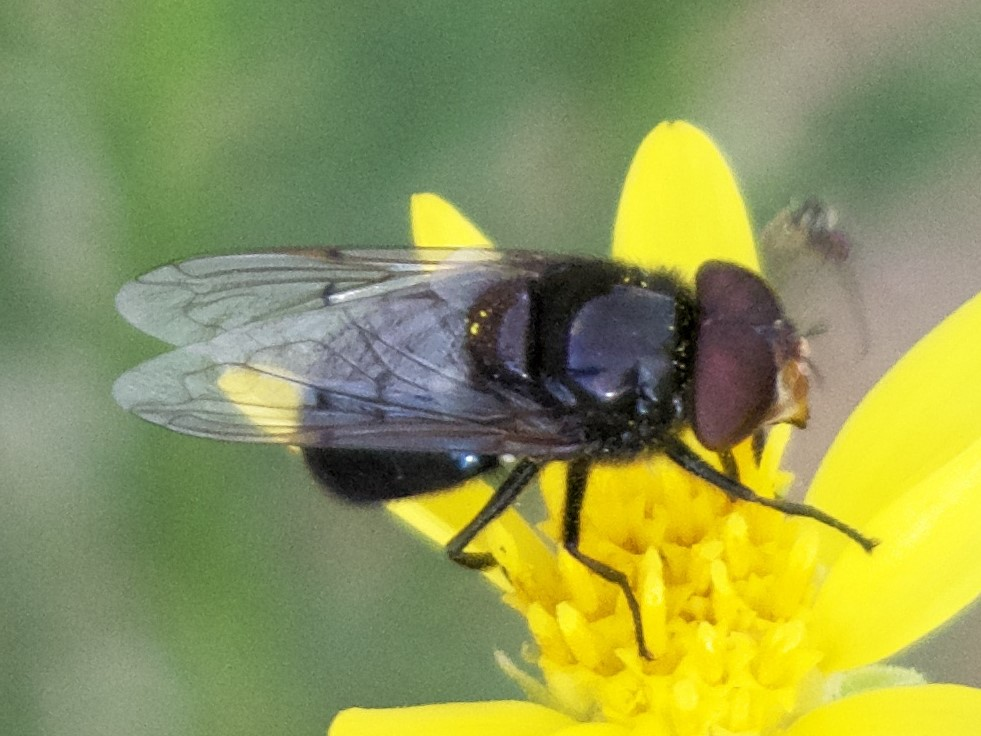

Scientific classification
- Kingdom: Animalia
- Phylum: Arthropoda
- Class: Insecta
- Order: Diptera
- Family: Syrphidae
- Genus: Copestylum
- Species: C. victoria

Binomial name
- Copestylum victoria (Williston, 1887)

Synonyms
- Volucella victoria Williston, 1887

= Copestylum victoria =

Species of fly

Copestylum victoria, or Victoria's bromeliad fly, is a species of syrphid fly in the family Syrphidae.
