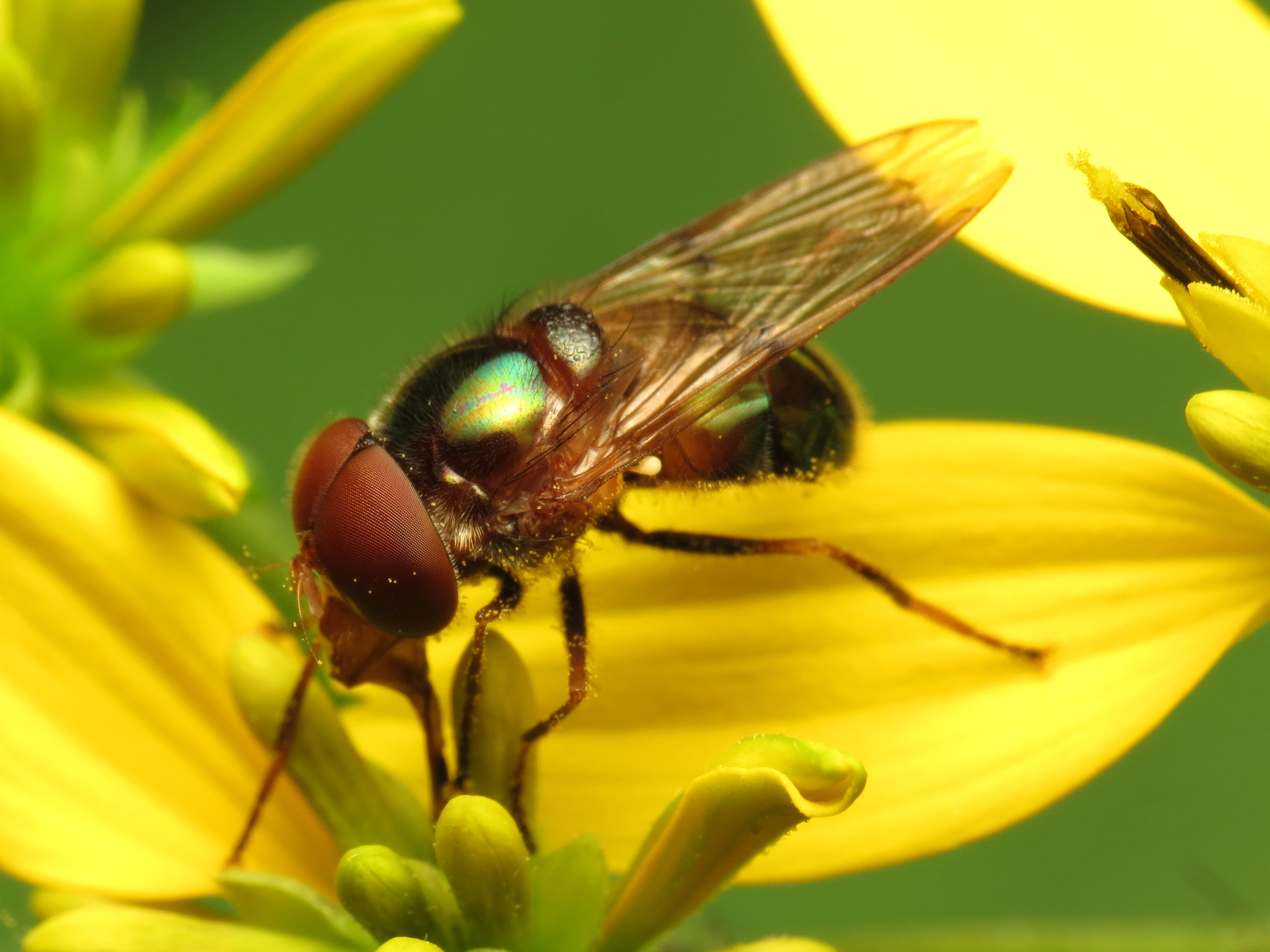

Scientific classification
- Kingdom: Animalia
- Phylum: Arthropoda
- Class: Insecta
- Order: Diptera
- Family: Syrphidae
- Genus: Copestylum
- Species: C. vesicularium

Binomial name
- Copestylum vesicularium (Curran, 1947)

Synonyms
- Volucella vesicularia Curran, 1947

= Copestylum vesicularium =

Species of fly

Copestylum vesicularium, the iridescent bromeliad fly, is a species of syrphid fly in the family Syrphidae. This species is widely distributed on the eastern half of North America.

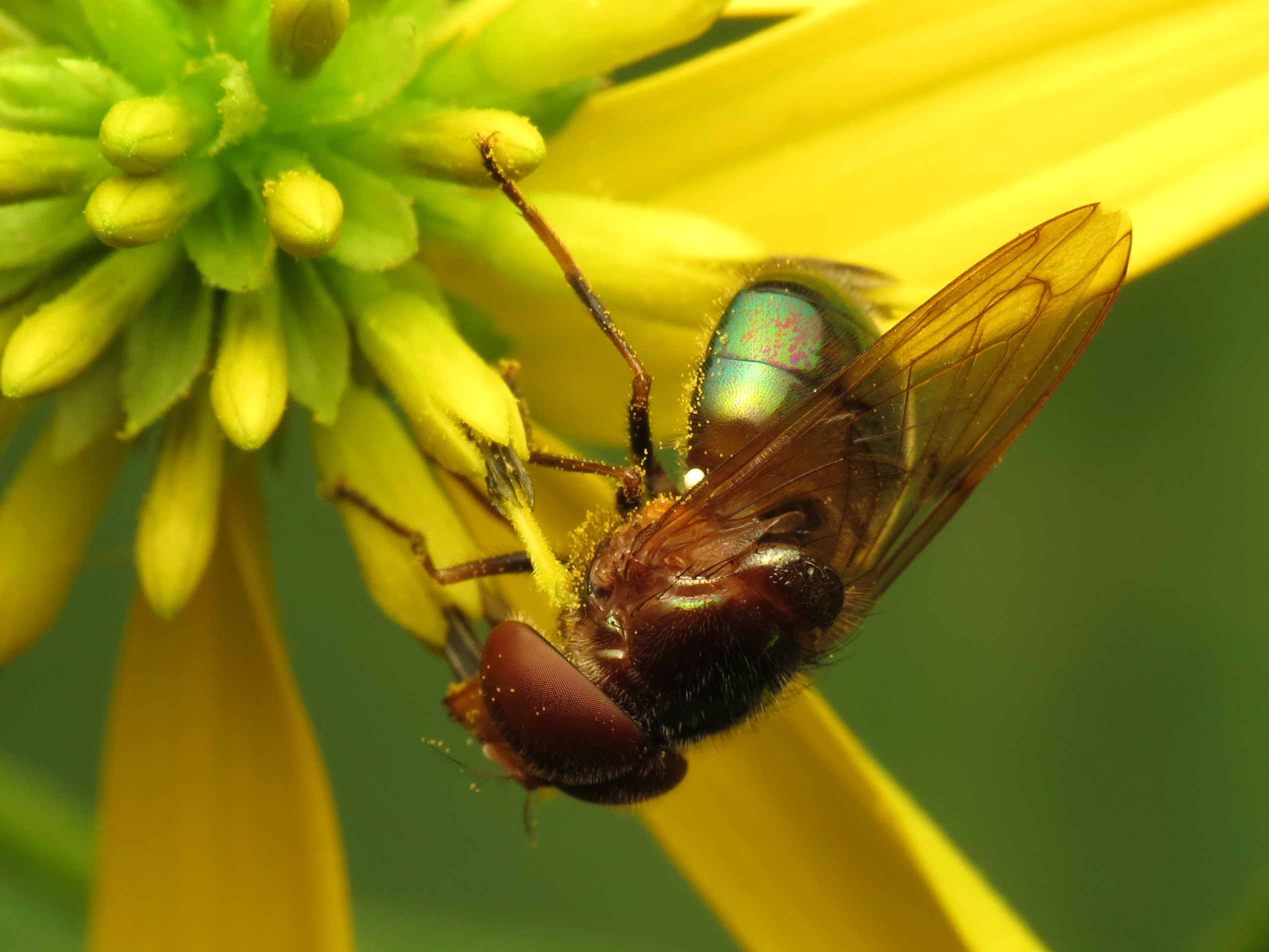
Iridescent bromeliad fly, Copestylum vesicularium
