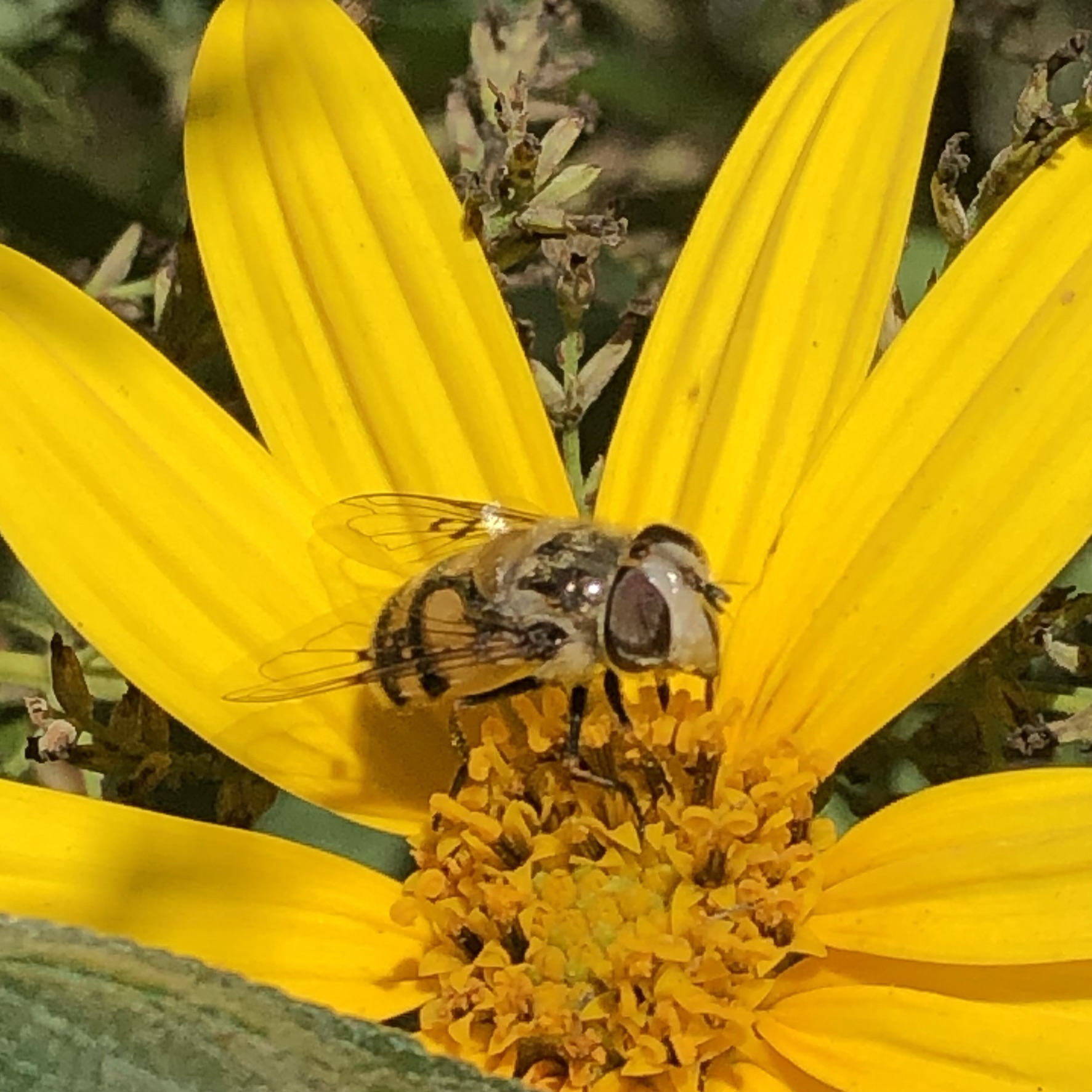

Scientific classification
- Kingdom: Animalia
- Phylum: Arthropoda
- Class: Insecta
- Order: Diptera
- Family: Syrphidae
- Genus: Copestylum
- Species: C. avidum

Binomial name
- Copestylum avidum (Osten Sacken, 1877)

Synonyms
- Volucella avida Osten Sacken, 1877; Volucella lutzi Curran, 1930

= Copestylum avidum =

Species of fly

Copestylum avidum, the yellow-spotted bromeliad fly, is a species of syrphid fly in the family Syrphidae.
