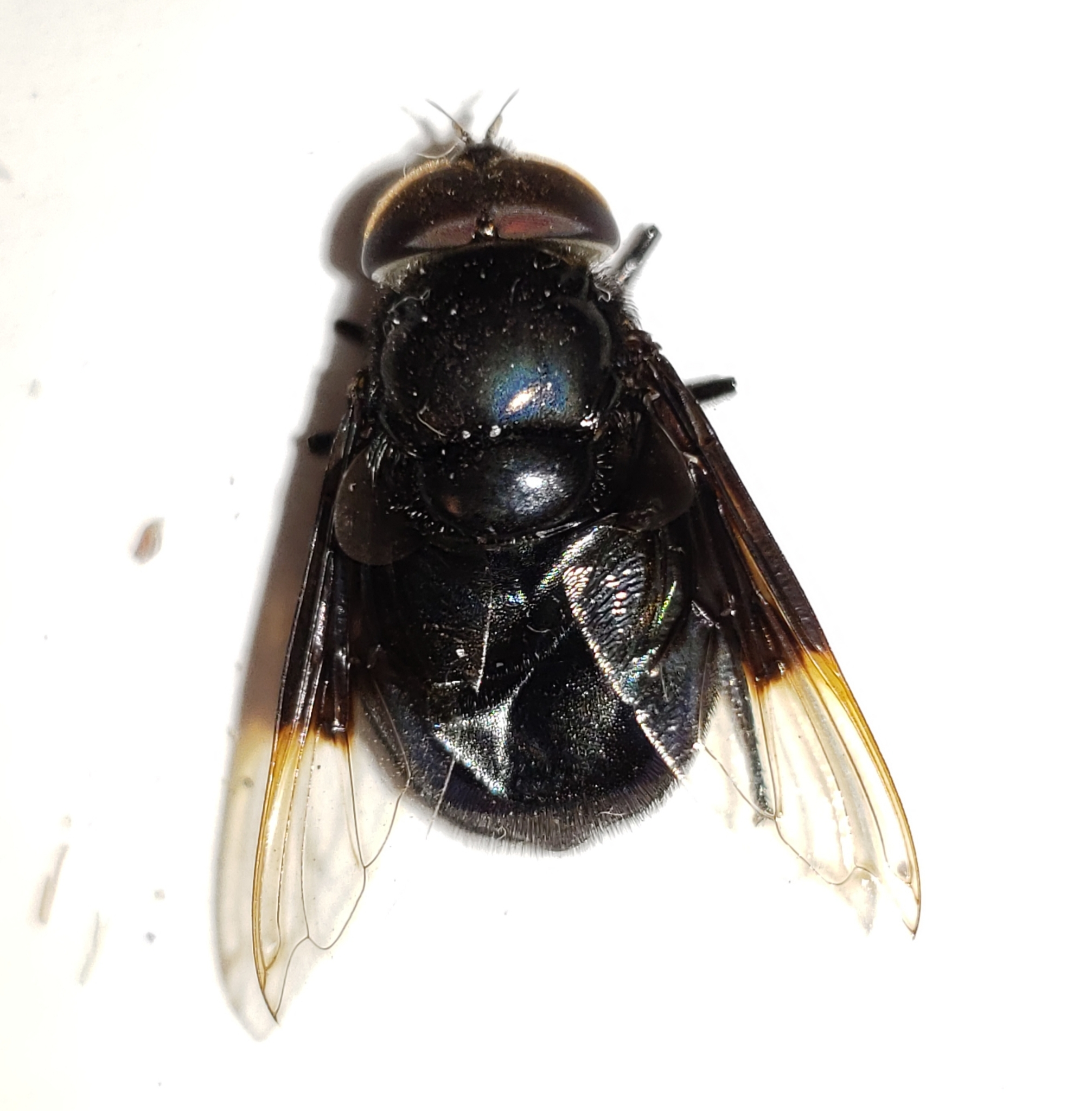

Scientific classification
- Kingdom: Animalia
- Phylum: Arthropoda
- Class: Insecta
- Order: Diptera
- Family: Syrphidae
- Genus: Copestylum
- Species: C. mexicanum

Binomial name
- Copestylum mexicanum (Macquart, 1842)

Synonyms
- Volucella mexicana Macquart, 1842; Volucella nigra Greene, 1923

= Copestylum mexicanum =

Species of fly

Copestylum mexicanum, the Mexican cactus fly, is a species of syrphid fly in the family Syrphidae.
