= Copestylum macrocephalum =

Scientific classification
- Domain: Eukaryota
- Kingdom: Animalia
- Phylum: Arthropoda
- Class: Insecta
- Order: Diptera
- Family: Syrphidae
- Genus: Copestylum
- Species: C. macrocephalum

Binomial name
- Copestylum macrocephalum (Giglio-Tos, 1892)

Synonyms
- Camerania macrocephalum Giglio-Tos, 1892

Species of fly

Copestylum macrocephalum is a species of syrphid fly in the family Syrphidae.This species has been observed in Mexico (Baja), California, and Arizona.
