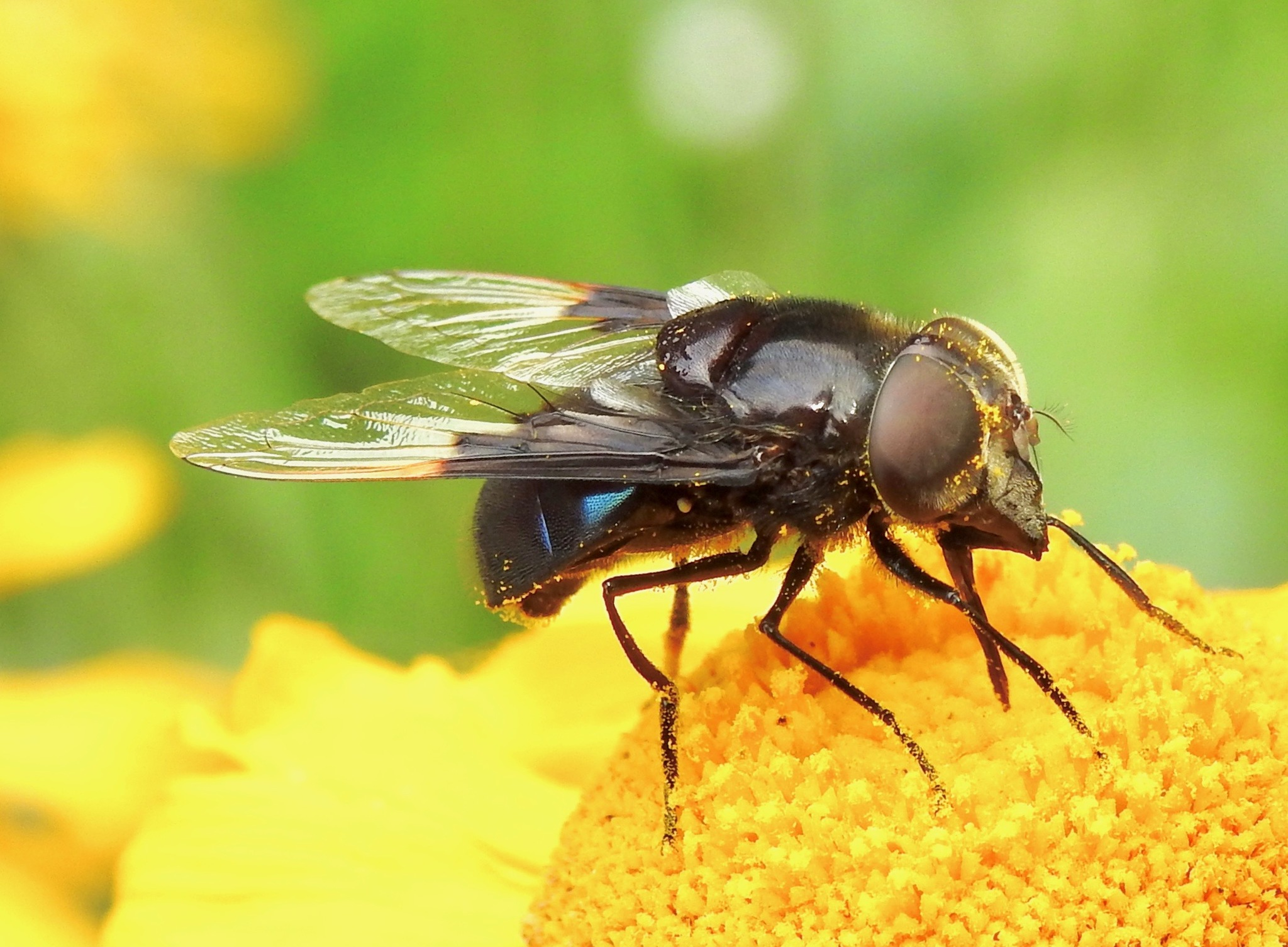

Scientific classification
- Kingdom: Animalia
- Phylum: Arthropoda
- Class: Insecta
- Order: Diptera
- Family: Syrphidae
- Genus: Copestylum
- Species: C. violaceum

Binomial name
- Copestylum violaceum (Say, 1829)

Synonyms
- Volucella maximiliani Jaennicke, 1867; Volucella violacea Say, 1829

= Copestylum violaceum =

Species of fly

Copestylum violaceum, the purple bromeliad fly, is a species of syrphid fly in the family Syrphidae.

A purple bromeliad fly visiting Paris daisy, variety Madeira deep pink. Last scene is repeated at one fourth speed.
