= Copestylum fornax =

Scientific classification
- Domain: Eukaryota
- Kingdom: Animalia
- Phylum: Arthropoda
- Class: Insecta
- Order: Diptera
- Family: Syrphidae
- Genus: Copestylum
- Species: C. fornax

Binomial name
- Copestylum fornax (Townsend, 1895)

Synonyms
- Volucella fornax Townsend, 1895

Species of fly

Copestylum fornax is a species of syrphid fly in the family Syrphidae.
