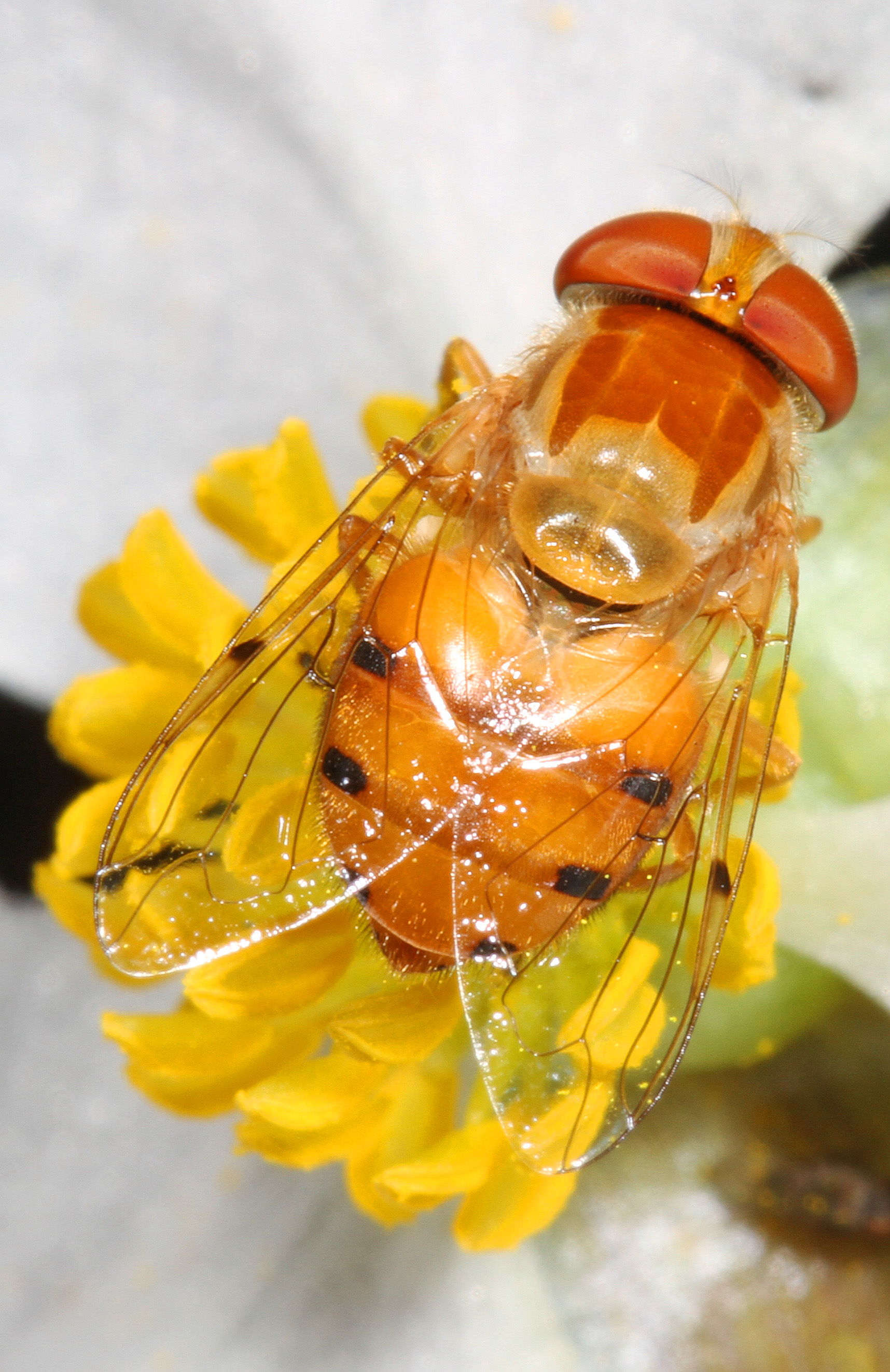
- C. sexmaculatum

Scientific classification
- Kingdom: Animalia
- Phylum: Arthropoda
- Class: Insecta
- Order: Diptera
- Family: Syrphidae
- Tribe: Volucellini
- Genus: Copestylum; Macquart, 1846

Type species
- Copestylum flaviventris Macquart, 1846

Species
- List of Copestylum species

= Copestylum =

Genus of flies

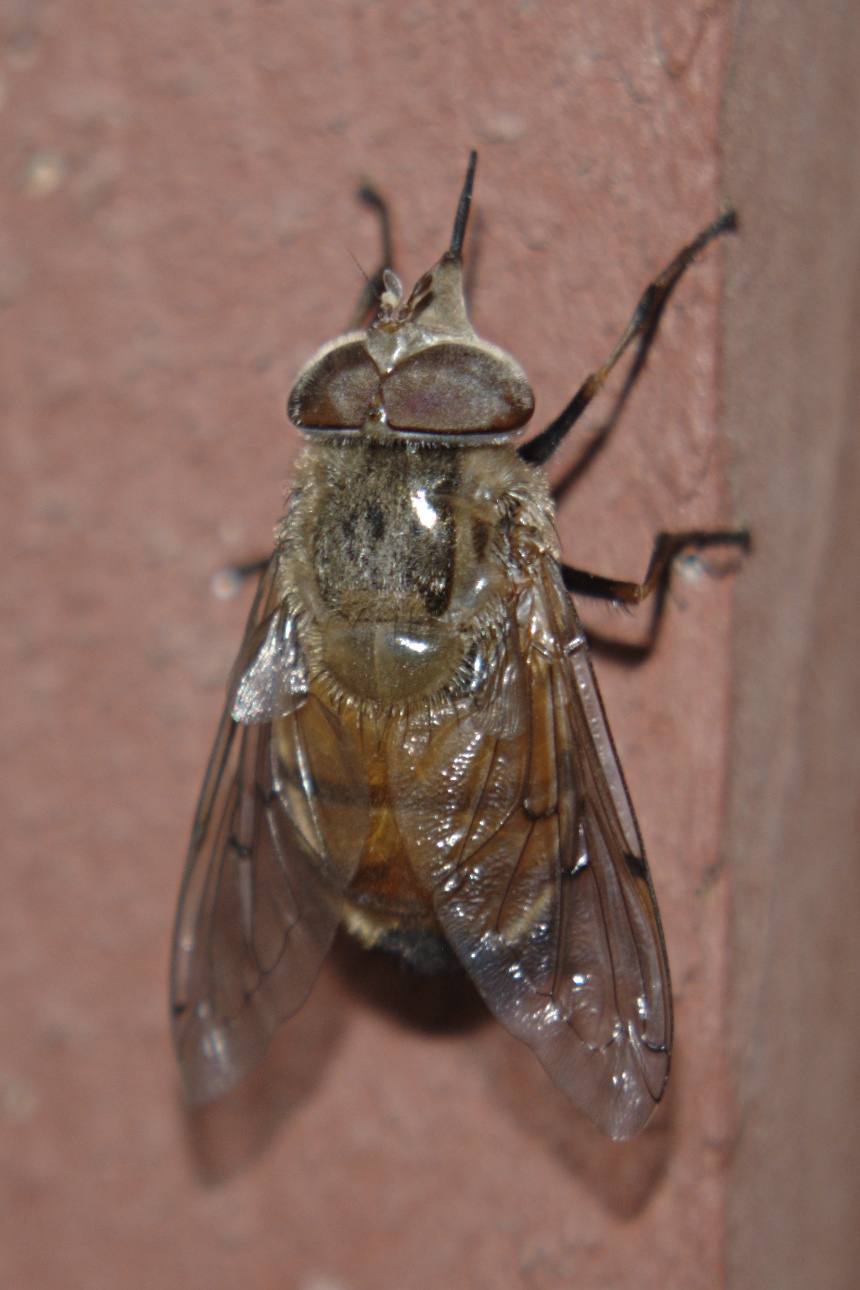
C. haagii

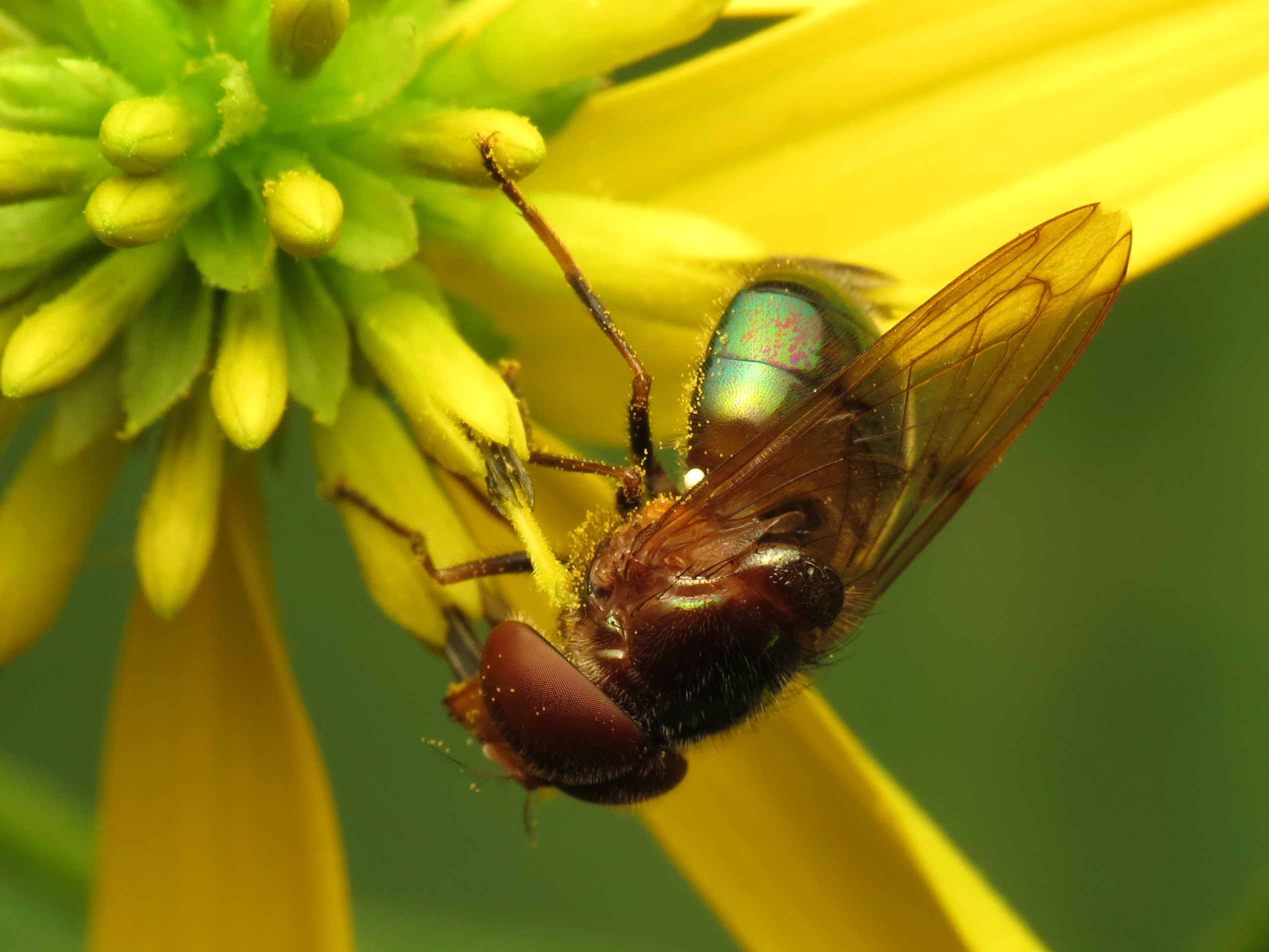
C. vesicularium

A purple bromeliad fly visiting Paris daisy, variety Madeira deep pink. Last scene is repeated at one fourth speed.

Copestylum is one of the largest genera of hoverflies in the Americas. It comprises more than 300 species, of which only four have been found outside the Americas, having probably been introduced by the importation of cacti in which the larvae live.

== Taxonomy ==
=== Subgenera and type species ===
The following is a list of the subgenera within Copestylum, with just the type species of each subgenus listed afterwards.

- Subgenus Copestylum Macquart, 1846 – type Copestylum flaviventre Macquart, 1846
- Subgenus Phalacromyia Rondani, 1848 – type Copestylum submetallicum (Rondani, 1848)
- Subgenus Glaurotricha Thomson, 1869 – type Copestylum muscarium (Thomson, 1869)
- Subgenus Atemnocera Bigot, 1882a – type Copestylum scutellatum (Macquart, 1842)
- Subgenus Apophysophora Williston, 1888 – type Copestylum trituberculatum Thomson, 1976
- Subgenus Megametopon (= Ophromyia) Giglio-Tos, 1891 – type Copestylum nasicum (Williston, 1891)
- Subgenus Camerania Giglio-Tos, 1892a (Note: originally described as Temnocera megacephala (Loew)) – type Copestylum macrocephalum (Giglio-Tos, 1892)
- Subgenus Viereckomyia Curran, 1925b – type Copestylum gibberum (Schiner, 1868)
- Subgenus Lepidopsis Curran, 1925b – type Copestylum compactum (Curran, 1925)
- Subgenus Volosyrpha Shannon, 1929 (Note: Type-species, tibialis Shannon preoccupied so renamed rufitarse by Thompson) – type Copestylum rufitarse Thomson, 1976
- Subgenus Volucellosia Curran, 1930d – type Copestylum fornax Townsend, 1895
- Subgenus Tachinosyrphus Hull, 1936b – type Copestylum pseudotachina (Hull, 1936)

=== Species ===
For a complete list of Copestylum species, see List of Copestylum species.
