= Palpada suprarufa =

Scientific classification
- Kingdom: Animalia
- Phylum: Arthropoda
- Class: Insecta
- Order: Diptera
- Family: Syrphidae
- Genus: Palpada
- Species: P. suprarufa

Binomial name
- Palpada suprarufa Thompson, 1999

Species of fly

Palpada suprarufa is a species of flower flies first found in Ecuador.
