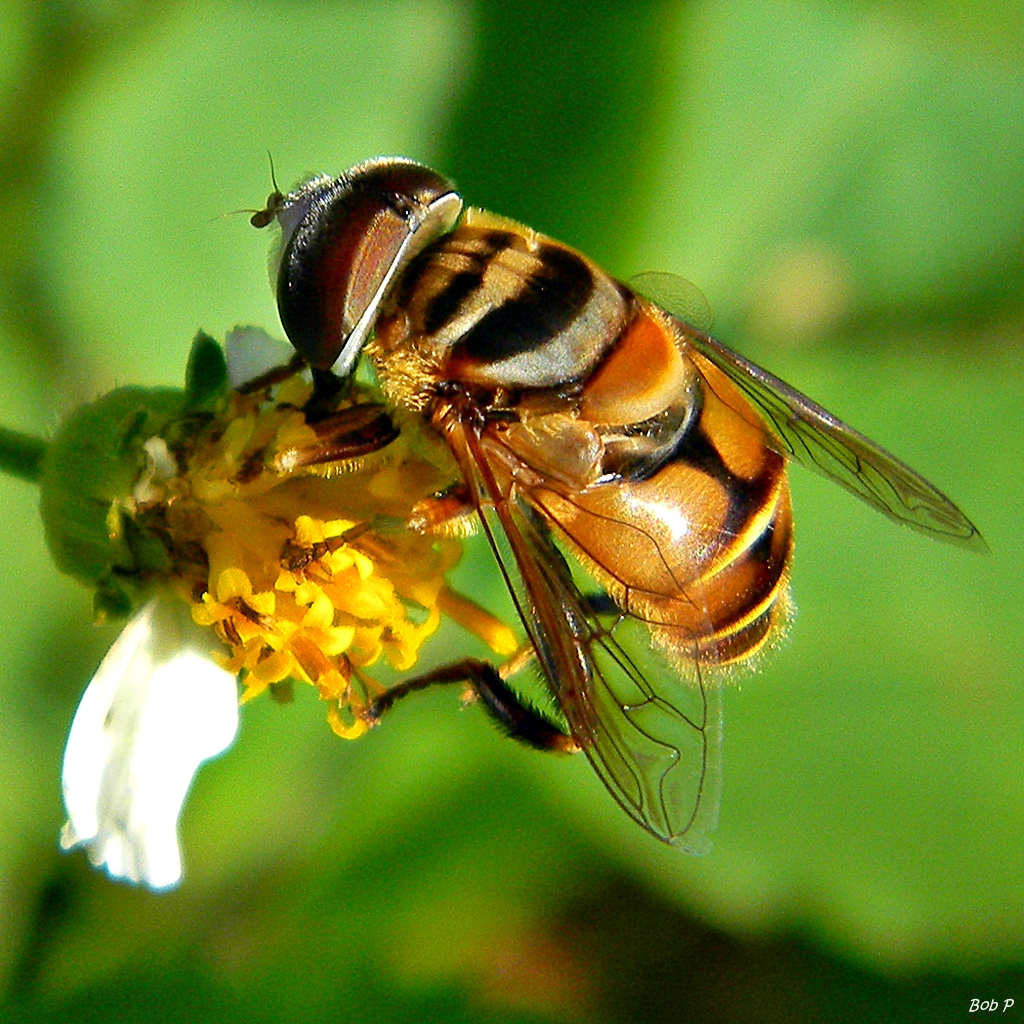
- Palpada sp.

Scientific classification
- Kingdom: Animalia
- Phylum: Arthropoda
- Class: Insecta
- Order: Diptera
- Family: Syrphidae
- Subfamily: Eristalinae
- Tribe: Eristalini
- Subtribe: Eristalina
- Genus: Palpada; Macquart, 1854

Type species
- Palpada scutellaris Fabricius, 1805

Synonyms
- Doliosyrphus Bigot, 1882a

= Palpada =

Genus of flies

Palpada is a genus of 85 neotropical and nearctic flower flies or hoverflies. This genus is often colorful and bee-like. It is in the tribe Eristaliini containing dozens of genera. Common sister genera include Eristalis (99 species), Meromacrus (43 sp.), Eristalinus (100 sp.) and Helophilus (50 sp.). The genus Palpada is distinguished by:

- Eyes with uniform pile.
- Meron with fine pale hairs in front of or below spiracle.
- Hind femur with basal patch of dense black setulae.
- Cell r_{2+3} closed before wing margin.
- R_{4+5} moderately to strongly dipped into cell r_{4+5}.

The larvae are aquatic and have a distinctive shape, usually being referred to as rat-tailed. The rat-tail is a breathng tube that allows the larvae to live in low oxygen water.

== Species ==
- P. aemula (Williston, 1891)
- P. agrorum (Fabricius, 1787)
- P. aemula (Williston, 1891)
- P. albifrons (Wiedemann, 1830)
- P. albiventris (Bigot, 1880)
- P. alhambra (Hull, 1925)
- P. amazon (Curran, 1930)
- P. atrimana (Loew, 1866)
- P. bequaerti (Hull, 1942)
- P. bistellata (Hull, 1935)
- P. braziliensis (Goot, 1964)
- P. caliginosa (Walker, 1849)
- P. chilena (Rondani, 1863)
- P. claripennis (Hull, 1949)
- P. clarissima (Giglio-tos, 1892)
- P. claudia (Curran, 1930)
- P. conica (Fabricius, 1805)
- P. cora (Hull, 1949)
- P. cordiformis (Morales, 2009)
- P. cosmia (Schiner, 1868)
- P. cyanea (Thunberg, 1819)
- P. diminuta (Walker, 1849)
- P. distinguenda (Wiedemann, 1830)
- P. doris (Curran, 1930)
- P. elegans (Blanchard, 1854)
- P. erratica (Curran, 1930)
- P. expicta (Walker, 1860)
- P. familiaris (Walker, 1860)
- P. fasciata (Wiedemann, 1819)
- P. fasciculata (Curran, 1938)
- P. flavipennis (Macquart, 1842)
- P. flavoscutellata (Hull, 1937)
- P. florea (Hull, 1925)
- P. fuliginosa (Hull, 1935)
- P. funerea (Rondani, 1850)
- P. furcata (Wiedemann, 1819)
- P. fuscipennis (Macquart, 1846)
- P. gagathina (Bigot, 1887)
- P. geniculata (Fabricius, 1805)
- P. hortorum (Fabricius, 1775)
- P. incubus (Hull, 1943)
- P. intermedia
- P. interrupta (Fabricius, 1805)
- P. inversa (Wiedemann, 1830)
- P. langi (Curran, 1934)
- P. lindneri (Thompson, 1999)
- P. macula (Sack, 1941)
- P. megafemur (Thompson, 1999 )
- P. meigenii (Wiedemann, 1830)
- P. melanaspis (Wiedemann, 1830)
- P. mexicana (Macquart, 1847)
- P. minutalis (Williston, 1891)
- P. mirabilis (Hull, 1925)
- P. mitis
- P. monticola (Röder, 1886)
- P. nigripes (Wiedemann, 1830)
- P. obsoleta Wiedemann, 1830
- P. ochracea (Williston, 1888)
- P. panorama (Reemer & Morales, 2016)
- P. parvula (Williston, 1888)
- P. precipua (Williston, 1888)
- P. precipuus
- P. prietorum (Mengual, 2008)
- P. pusilla (Macquart, 1842)
- P. pusio (Wiedemann, 1830)
- P. pusioides (Hull, 1951)
- P. pygolampa (Wiedemann, 1830)
- P. ruficeps (Macquart, 1842)
- P. rufipedes (Thompson, 1976)
- P. rufiventris (Macquart, 1846)
- P. rufoscutellata (Sack, 1921)
- P. schistacea (Williston, 1888)
- P. scopanthus (Hull, 1944)
- P. scutellaris (Fabricius, 1805)
- P. semicirculus (Walker, 1852)
- P. signata (Lagrange, 1987)
- P. solennis (Walker, 1852)
- P. spectabilis (Hull, 1925)
- P. suprarufa (Thompson, 1999)
- P. taenia (Wiedemann, 1830)
- P. tatei (Curran, 1930)
- P. texana (Hull, 1925)
- P. thalia (Hull, 1942)
- P. triangularis (Giglio-tos, 1892)
- P. urotaenia (Curran, 1930)
- P. vera (Hull, 1949)
- P. vierecki (Curran, 1930)
- P. vinetorum (Fabricius 1799)
- P. xanthosceles (Thompson, 1981)
