= Palpada lindneri =

Scientific classification
- Kingdom: Animalia
- Phylum: Arthropoda
- Clade: Pancrustacea
- Class: Insecta
- Order: Diptera
- Family: Syrphidae
- Genus: Palpada
- Species: P. lindneri

Binomial name
- Palpada lindneri Thompson, 1999

Species of fly

Palpada lindneri is a species of flower flies first found in Bolivia.
