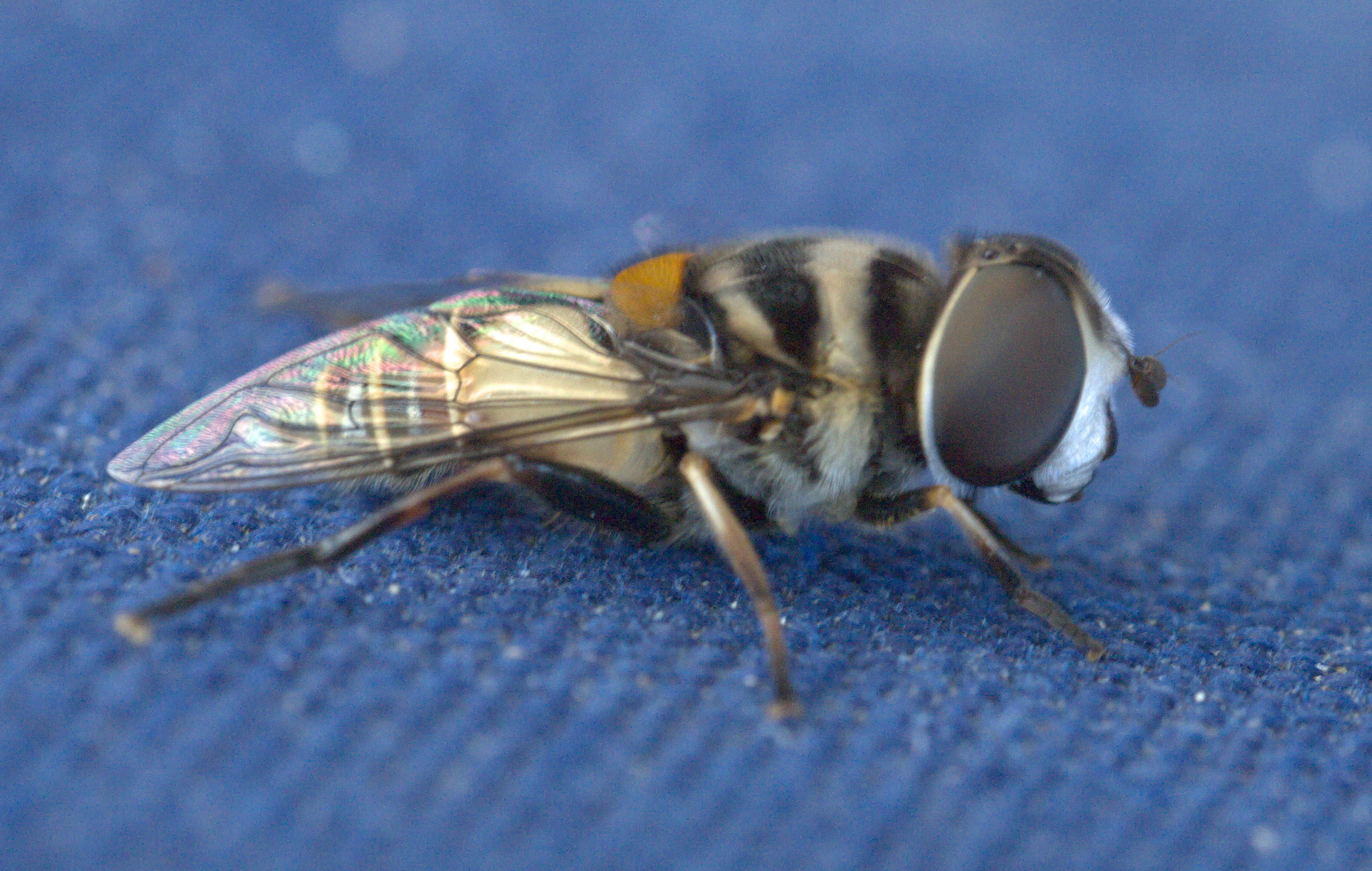

Scientific classification
- Kingdom: Animalia
- Phylum: Arthropoda
- Class: Insecta
- Order: Diptera
- Family: Syrphidae
- Genus: Palpada
- Species: P. albifrons

Binomial name
- Palpada albifrons (Wiedemann, 1830)
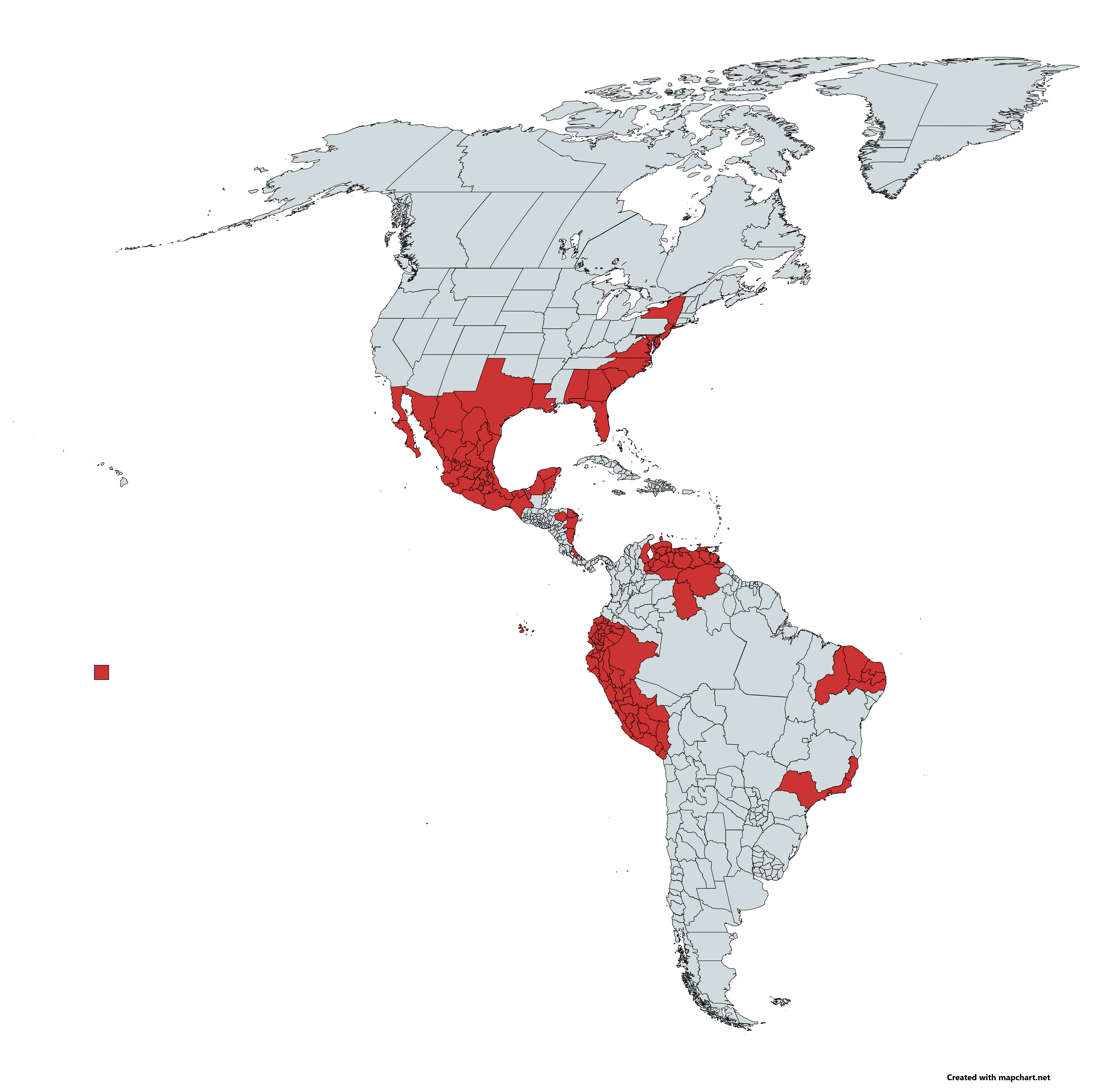
- P. albifrons range 2023

Synonyms
- Eristalis albiceps Macquart, 1842; Eristalis albifrons Wiedemann, 1830

= Palpada albifrons =

Species of fly

Palpada albifrons (Weidemann 1830), the White-faced Plushback , is a rare species of syrphid fly observed in from Mexico north-eastward along the coastal areas of the United States ( see map). Hoverflies can remain nearly motionless in flight. The adults are also known as flower flies, for they are commonly found on flowers from which they get both energy-giving nectar and protein-rich pollen. The larvae are aquatic.

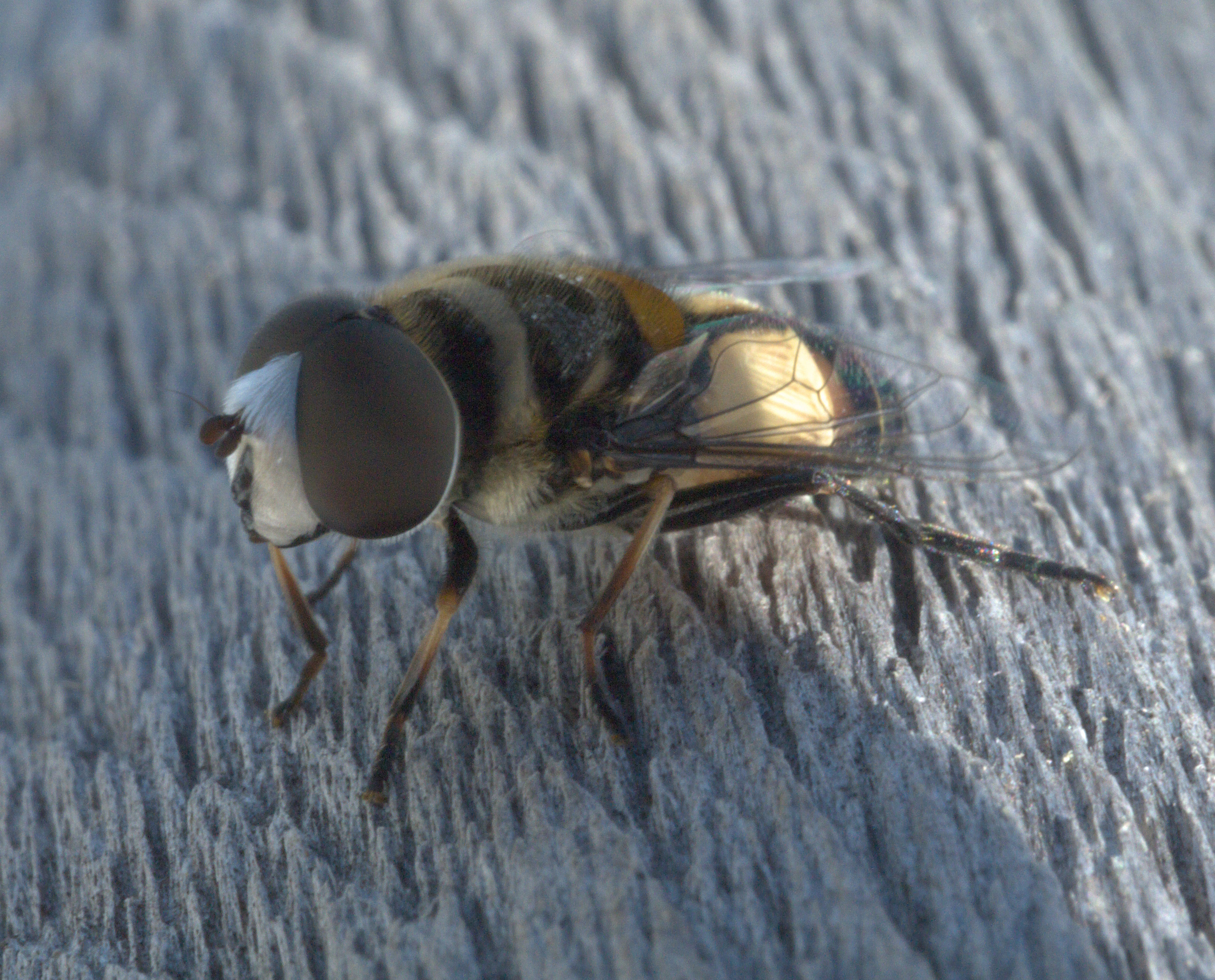

== Description ==
For terminology seeSpeight key to genera and glossary

Length

8–9 mm (0.31–0.35 in)

Head

The face is covered with white pollen and a thick white pile, which is more abundant and conspicuous on the frontal triangle. The facial stripe and gena are shining black. The eyes are pilose, Holoptic in the male. The antennae are obscurely reddish or brown, and the arista is bare.

Thorax

The scutum is covered with yellowish-white pile in front, intermixed with blackish behind; in front of the suture is a conspicuous grayish, pollinose broad band, and on each side is an oblique spot reaching from the base of the wing backward toward the scutellum. The female of this species differs, having a complete grayish band on the scutum in front of the scutellum. The scutellum is yellow, with a narrowly black base and black pile.

Abdomen

The first segment of the abdomen is black, with yellow outer angles. The second segment is light yellow, with a narrow median, opaque black stripe not quite reaching the hind margin, which is a little broader in front, where it connects with the semicircular black below the scutellum. The third segment has an oval reddish-yellow spot on each side, confluent with the yellow of the preceding segment, and the hind border is yellow, with the black deep opaque without any shining spot or band. The fourth segment has a yellow hind border, and a narrow, interrupted shining fascia which is dilated on the sides. The hypopygium is shining black with light pile, and the pile on the opaque portions is black, while the yellow spots have yellow pile. In the female, the second segment of the abdomen is broadly opaque black in the middle, narrower in front and extending as a band to the lateral margin of the abdomen behind. The third and fourth segments also have each a narrow, interrupted shining fascia, and the lower part of the front is not wholly white pilose.

Wings

The wings are hyaline, sometimes faintly clouded in the middle and outer parts. Near the end of the marginal cell (r1), there is a distinct curvature of the second vein (R_{2+3}) into the submarginal cell (r_{2+3}). The (R_{1}) cell is petiolate and the vein (R_{4+5}) is curved.

Legs

The legs are black. The hind femora are dilated. The joints, the basal third of the front and hind tibiae, the basal half of the intermediate tibiae, and the middle metatarsi are light yellow. The extreme base of the anterior metatarsi has a light to medium greenish tinge.
