= Palpada megafemur =

Scientific classification
- Kingdom: Animalia
- Phylum: Arthropoda
- Clade: Pancrustacea
- Class: Insecta
- Order: Diptera
- Family: Syrphidae
- Genus: Palpada
- Species: P. megafemur

Binomial name
- Palpada megafemur Thompson, 1999

Species of fly

Palpada megafemur is a species of flower flies. It is named after its particularly large metafemur. It is found in Brazil.

== Description ==
The following description is of a male specimen. Its face is black except for a brownish tubercle. Its thorax is black except for the yellow scutellum; the postpronotum is yellowish brown; the mesonotum is yellow pilose; the scutellum is yellow except narrowly black on the base; pleuron is gray pollinose; the calypter, plumula and haltere are orange.

Its coxae and trochanters are black; its femora are black except becoming brownish to orange on the apical 1/4, and shiny except for the mesofemur, which is sparsely gray on its apical 2/3; tibiae are orange; tarsi are orange. Its metafemur is greatly enlarged, its ventral margin sinuate, with a large ventral tubercle on the basoposterior 1/3.

The wings are light brown and microtrichose except for some bare portions.

The abdomen's 1st tergum is black; 2nd tergum yellow except for small basomedial triangular maculae; 3rd tergum is yellow, with indistinct dark medial vitta; 4th tergum is brownish black and light yellowish brown laterally. Its 1st sternum is black; 2nd and 3rd sterna are yellow; 4th sternum is brownish black except for its yellow apical margin. Male genitalia are orangish brown.
