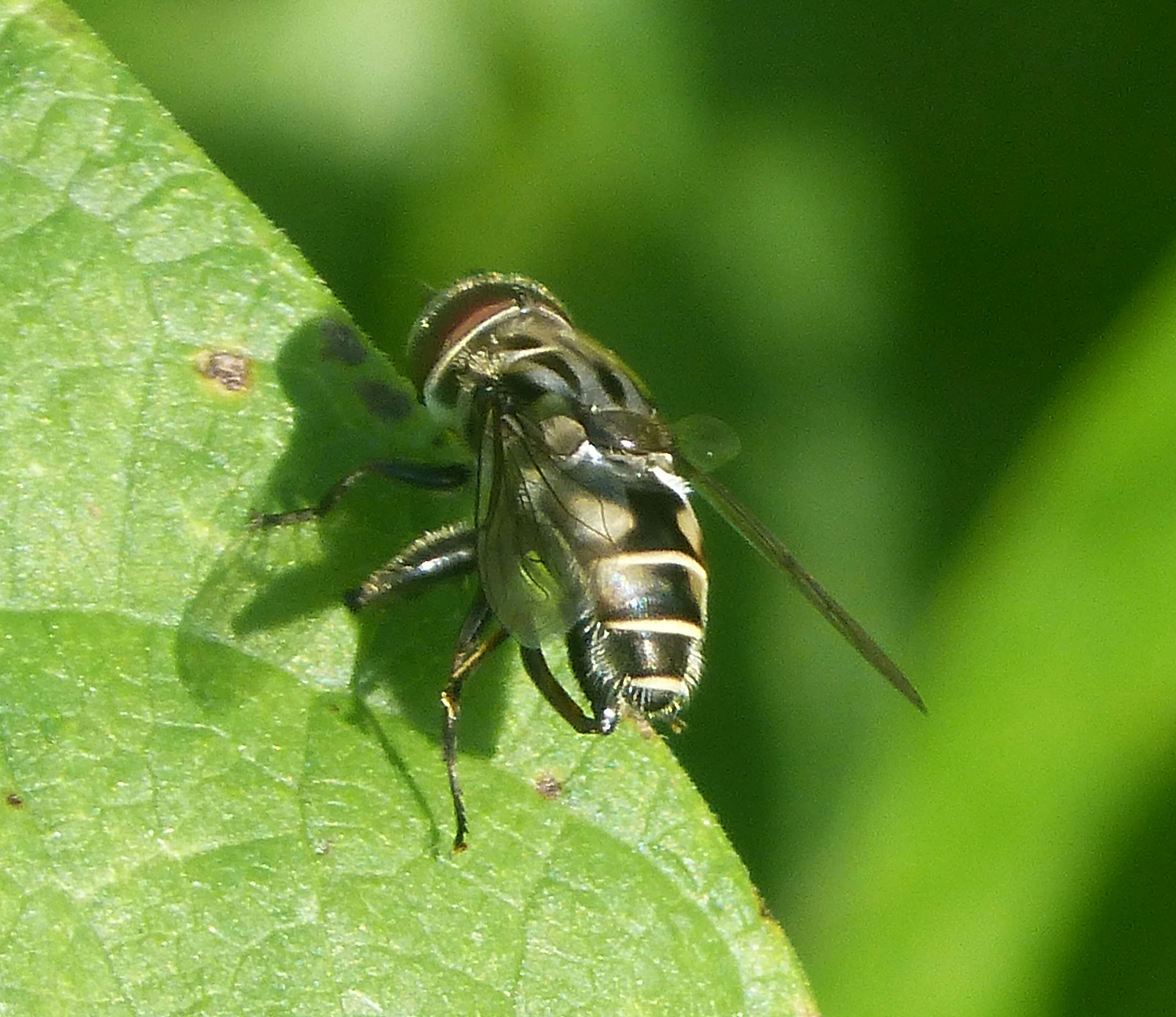

Scientific classification
- Domain: Eukaryota
- Kingdom: Animalia
- Phylum: Arthropoda
- Class: Insecta
- Order: Diptera
- Family: Syrphidae
- Genus: Palpada
- Species: P. furcata

Binomial name
- Palpada furcata (Wiedemann, 1819)

Synonyms
- Eristalis furcata Wiedemann, 1819; Eristalis involvens Walker, 1860

= Palpada furcata =

Species of fly

Palpada furcata is a species of syrphid fly in the family Syrphidae.
