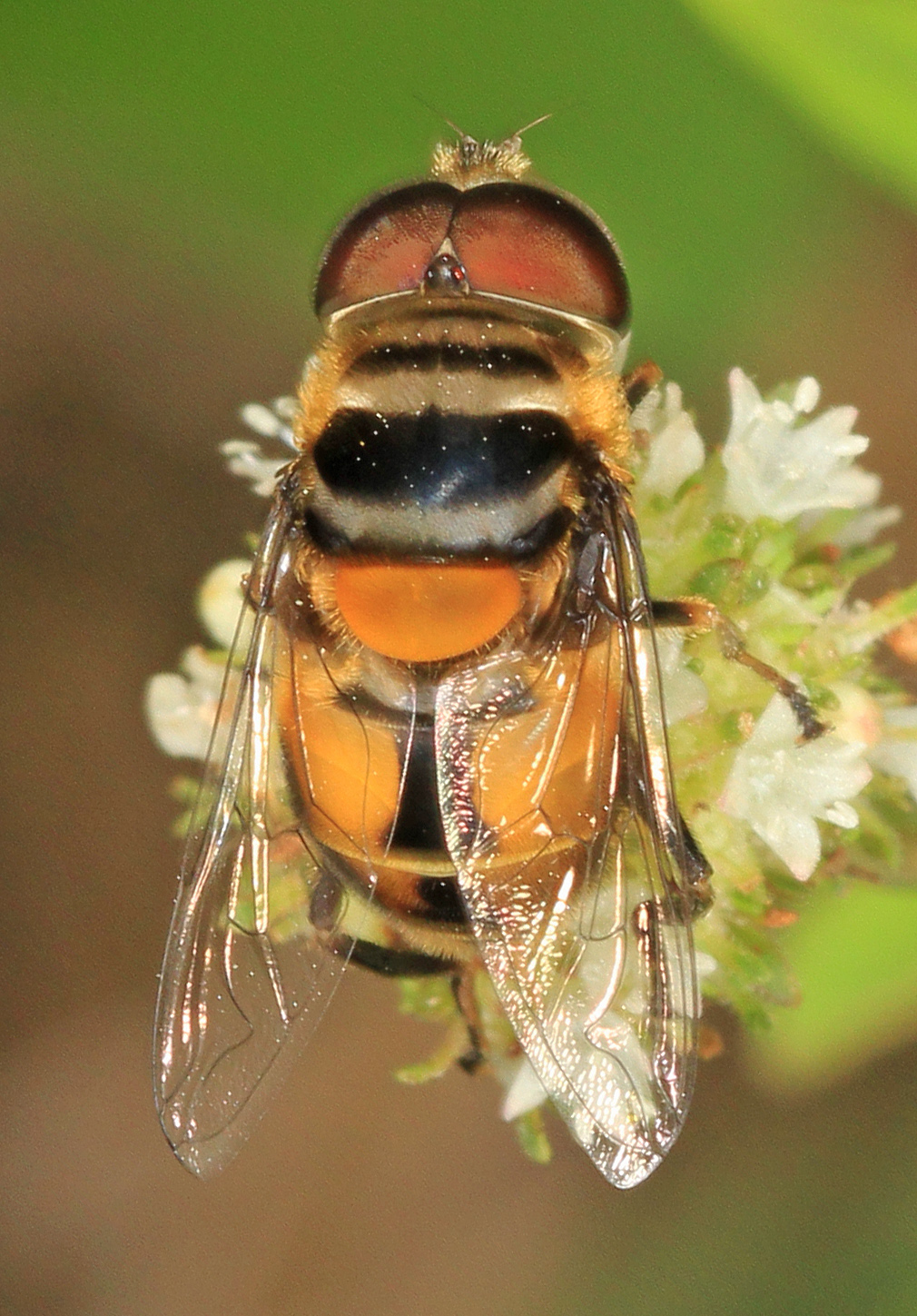

Scientific classification
- Domain: Eukaryota
- Kingdom: Animalia
- Phylum: Arthropoda
- Class: Insecta
- Order: Diptera
- Family: Syrphidae
- Genus: Palpada
- Species: P. agrorum

Binomial name
- Palpada agrorum (Fabricius, 1787)

Synonyms
- Eristalis cubensis Macquart, 1842; Syrphus agrorum Fabricius, 1787

= Palpada agrorum =

Species of fly

Palpada agrorum, the Double-banded Plushback, is a common species of syrphid fly first officially described by Fabricius in 1787. Hoverflies get their names from the ability to remain nearly motionless while in flight. The adults are also known as flower flies for they are commonly found around and on flowers, from which they get both energy-giving nectar and protein-rich pollen. The larvae are aquatic filter feeders of the rat-tailed type.

== Distribution ==
external map This species is found in North and South America with the most common occurrences in the South East United States.

== Description ==
For terms see Morphology of Diptera.

external images

Head

The face is concealed beneath white pollen and thick pure white pile that is more abundant on the frontal triangle. The facial stripe and cheeks are shining black. The eyes are pilose and Holoptic in male. Antennae are obscurely reddish or ferruginous with a bare arista.

Thorax

The scutum is black, clothed with yellowish-white pile in front, intermixed with blackish pile behind. In front of the suture is a conspicuous grayish pollinose broad band, and on each side with an oblique spot reaching from the root of the wing backward toward the scutellum. The scutellum is yellow, with a narrowly black base, and black pile female. Differs in the presence of a complete grayish band on the dorsum of the thorax in front of the scutellum The meron has fine pale hairs in front of or below spiracle.

Abdomen

First segment of abdomen black with the outer angles yellow. The second segment is light yellow, with a narrow median opaque black stripe not quite reaching the hind margin, and a little broader in front. The third segment is black with an anterior oval reddish yellow spot on each side, confluent with the yellow of the preceding segment, the hind border is yellow. The fourth segment is black with a yellow hind border, and a narrow interrupted shining fascia dilated on the sides; The hypopygium is shining black with light pile; pile on the opaque portions black, on the yellow spots yellow. In the female the second segment of the abdomen is broadly opaque black in the middle, narrower in front and extending as a fascia to the lateral margin of the abdomen behind; the third and fourth segments have each, also, a narrow, interrupted shining fascia, and the lower part of the front is not wholly white pilose.

Wing

The wings are hyaline, sometimes faintly clouded in the middle and outer parts. Near the end of the marginal cell there is a distinct curvature of the second vein (R_{2+3}) into the submarginal cell. Cell r_{2+3} closed before wing margin.

Legs

The legs are mostly black. The knees, basal third of front and hind tibia, basal half of the intermediate tibiae, and the middle metatarsi are light yellow. The extreme base of the anterior metatarsi are luteous. The hind femora are dilated.

R_{4+}5 moderately to strongly dipped into cell r_{4+5} . Cell r2+3 closed before wing margin

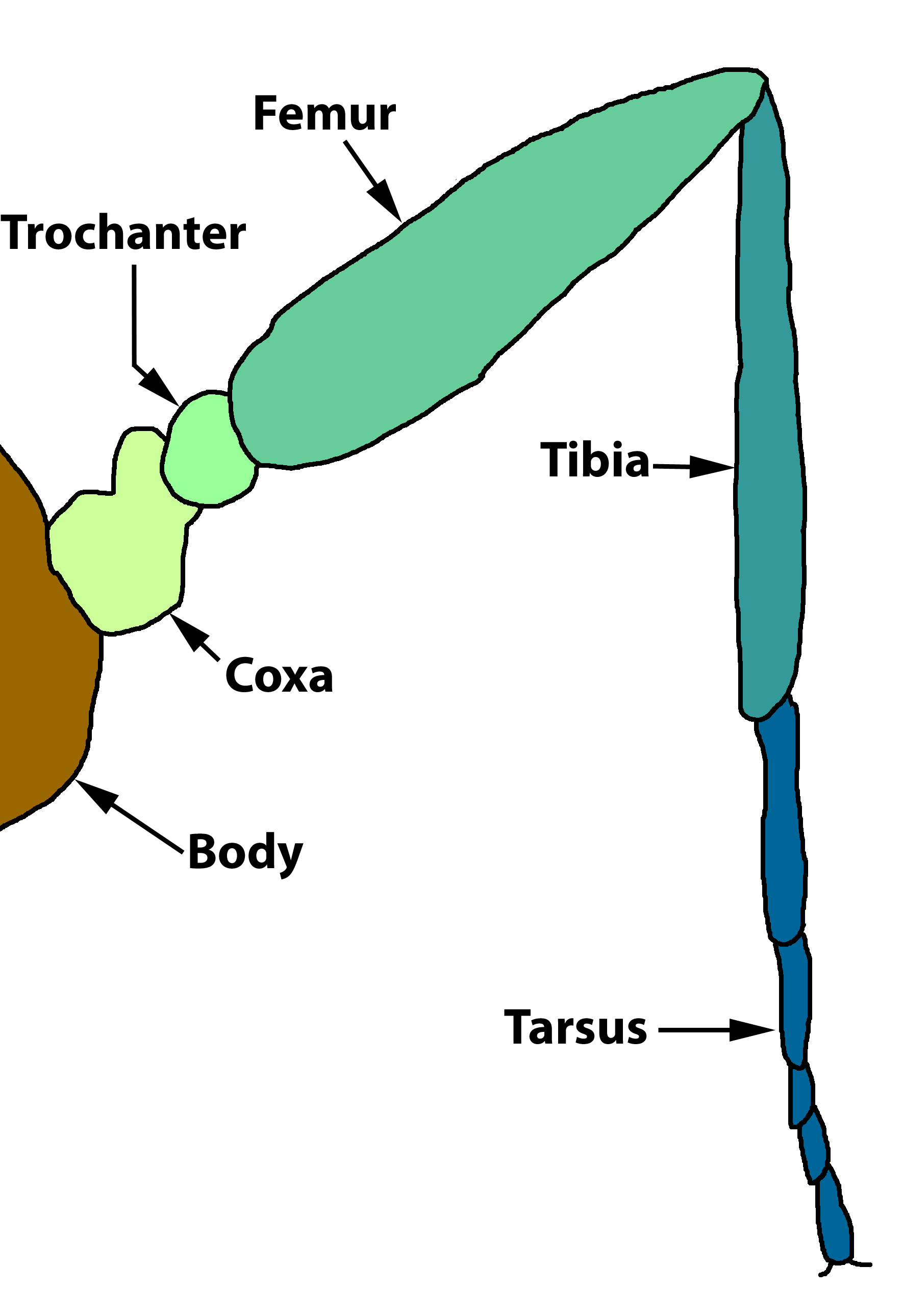
Insect leg

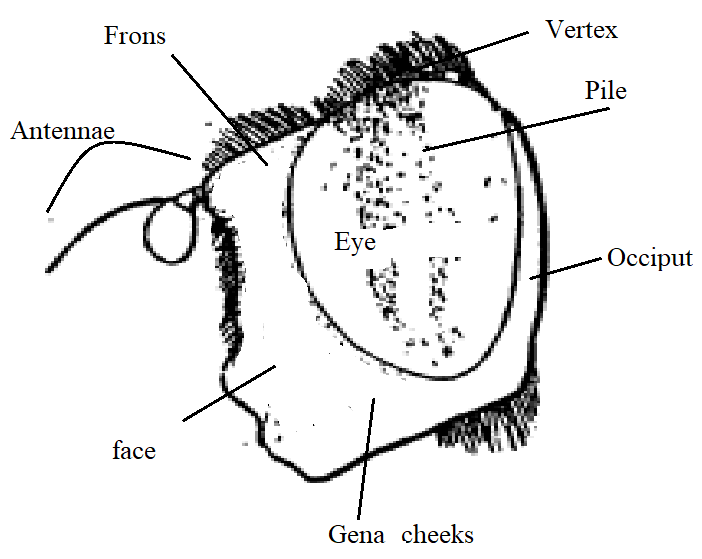
head diagram

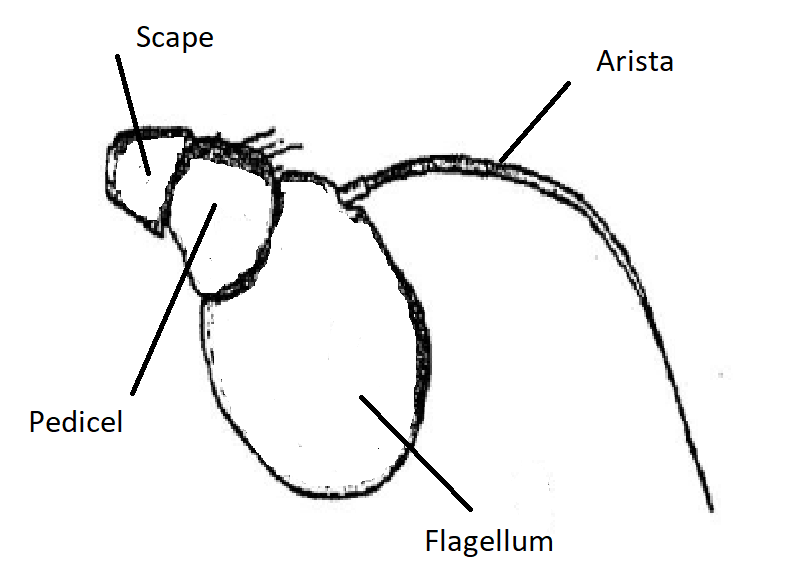
Antenna syrphid

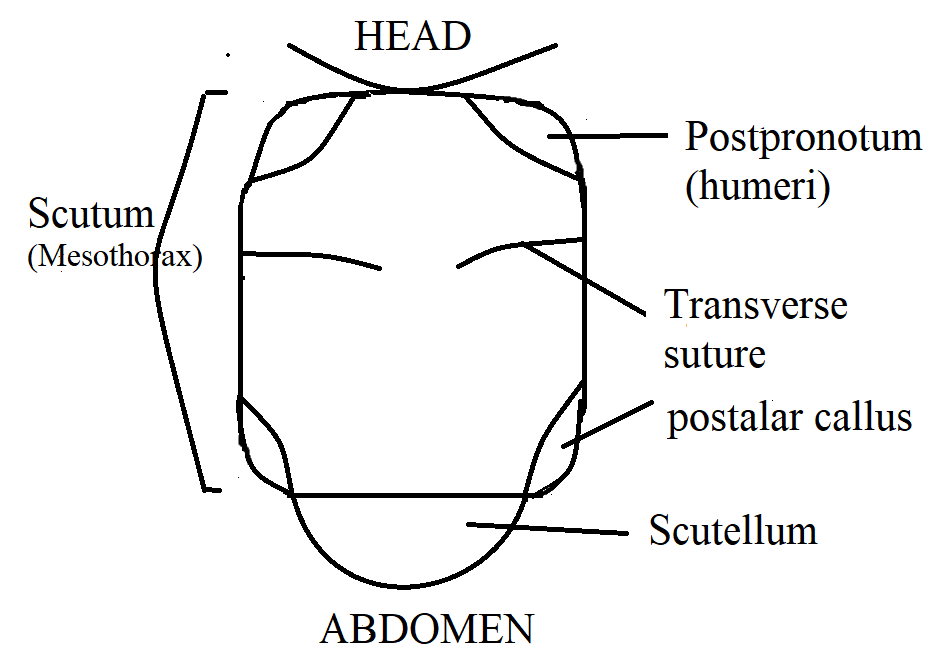
dorsal view of Syrphid thorax
