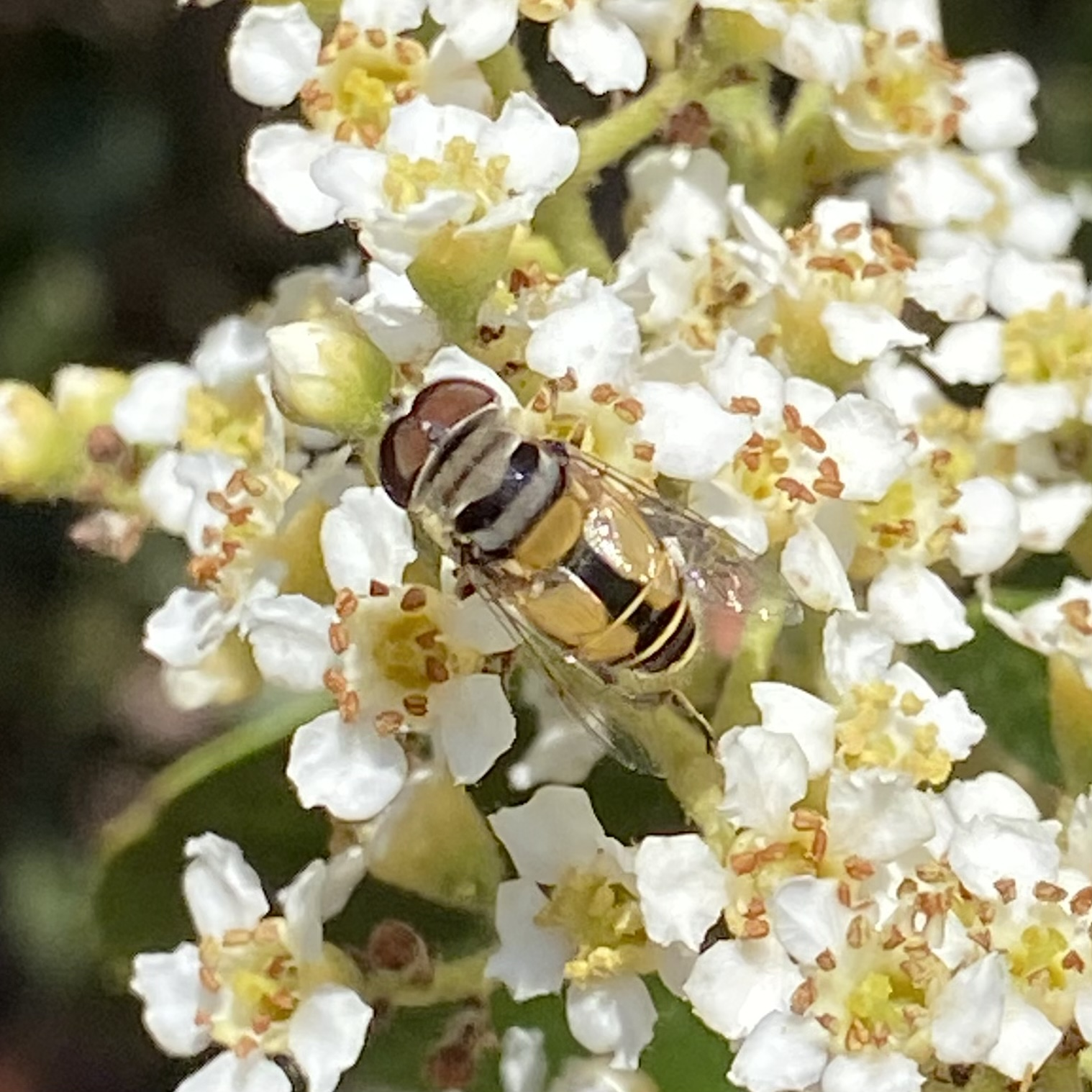

Scientific classification
- Domain: Eukaryota
- Kingdom: Animalia
- Phylum: Arthropoda
- Class: Insecta
- Order: Diptera
- Family: Syrphidae
- Genus: Palpada
- Species: P. alhambra

Binomial name
- Palpada alhambra (Hull, 1925)

Synonyms
- Eristalis alhambra Hull, 1925

= Palpada alhambra =

Species of fly

Palpada alhambra is a species of syrphid fly in the family Syrphidae. P. alhambra is found in California, Nevada, and Arizona.
