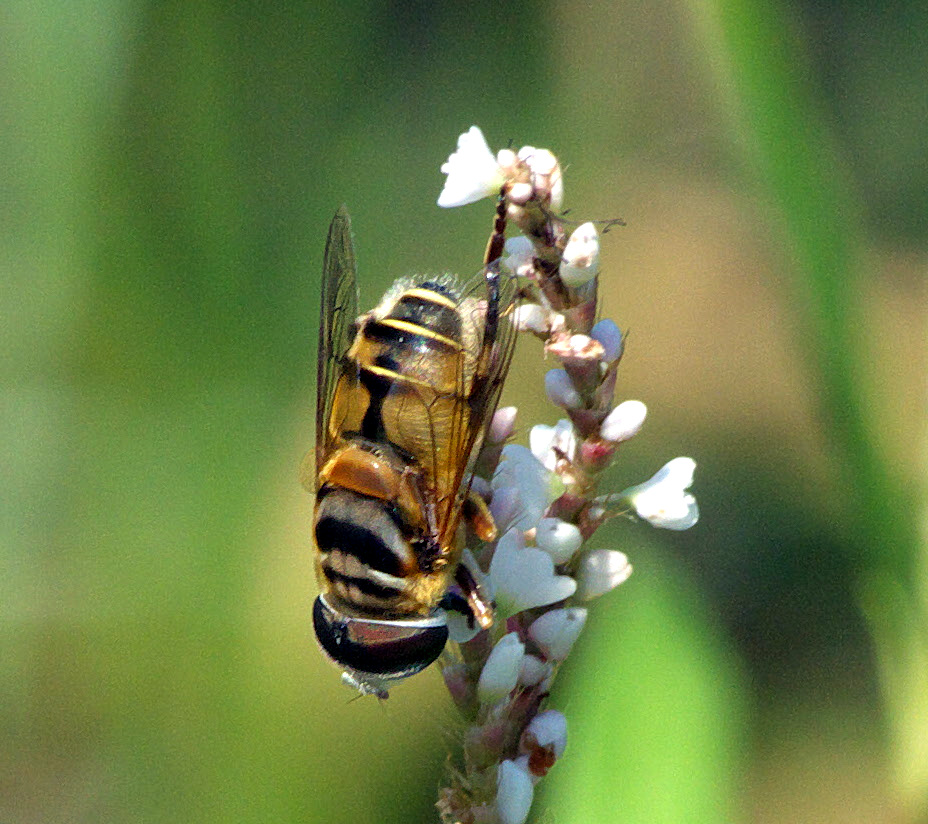

Scientific classification
- Kingdom: Animalia
- Phylum: Arthropoda
- Clade: Pancrustacea
- Class: Insecta
- Order: Diptera
- Family: Syrphidae
- Genus: Palpada
- Species: P. vinetorum

Binomial name
- Palpada vinetorum (Fabricius, 1798)

Synonyms
- Eristalis trifasciatus Say, 1829; Syrphus vinetorum Fabricius, 1798

= Palpada vinetorum =

Species of fly

Palpada vinetorum is a species of syrphid fly in the family Syrphidae. It is a native flower fly species to North America, mainly found in Texas and parts of the east coast.

== Description ==
Length
10 to 14mm.
Head
Frontal triangle covered with white pile. The middle frons with a thin brownish stripe and yellow brown pile to the eyes.; Sime blackish pile notednear the ocelli. The face is reddish-yellow with whitish pollen and pile on the sides. The median stripe (tubercle) and cheeks shining, somewhat brownish. Antennae reddish-yellow, arista bare. Eyes are Holoptic in male. The occiput is black above, white pile below.
Thorax
Scutum has three distinct grayish-olivaceous crescent shaped bands over an opaque black base color., The first grey band is on the front border, the second just before the lateral suture, and the third, the broadest, is just in front of the scutellum, yellowish; pleurae are yellowish with grayish pollen. The scutellum is reddish-yellow with a lighter posterior border and long yellow pile along posterior edge.

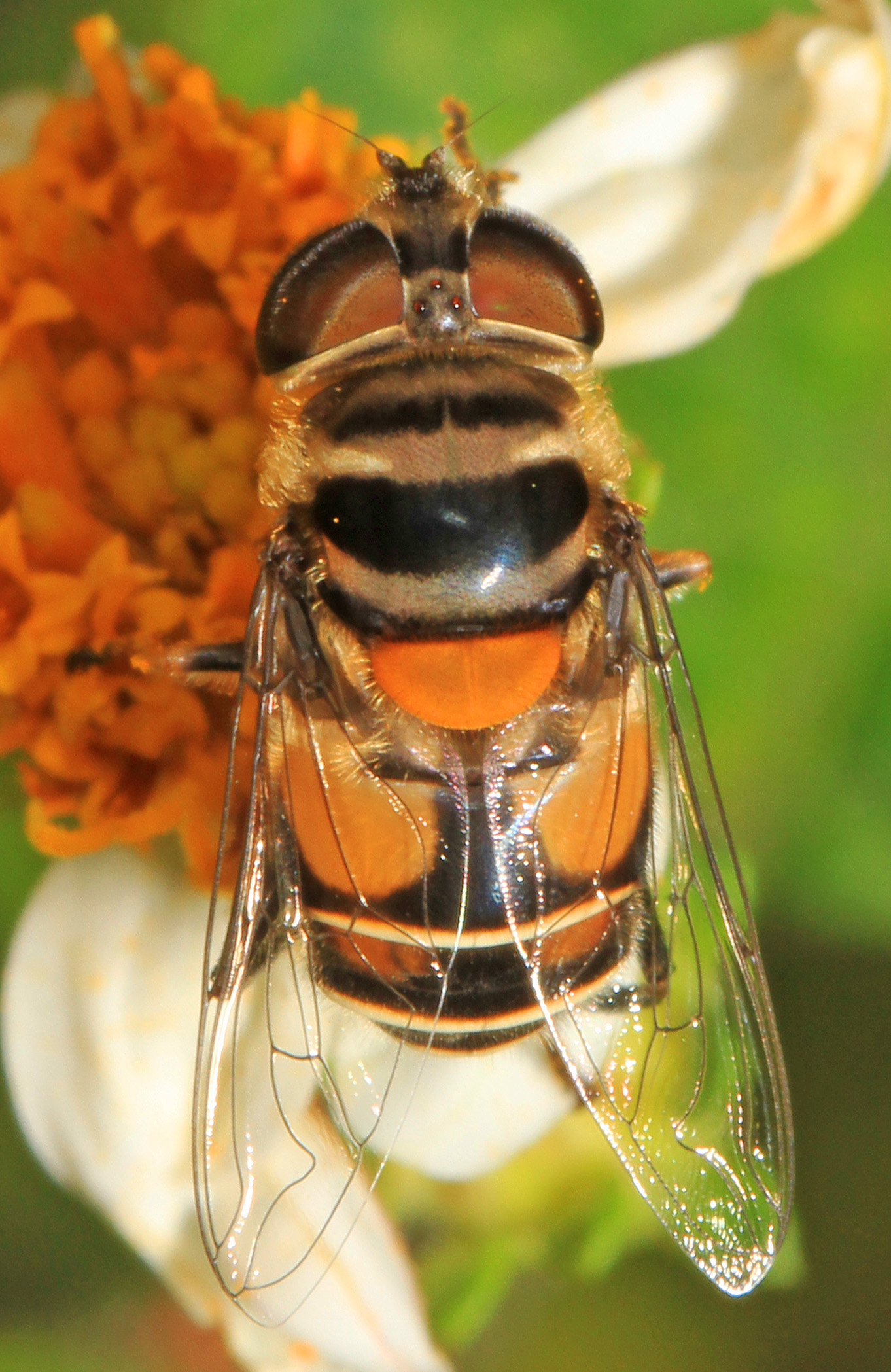

Abdomen
The first segment is black, reddish-yellow on the sides. The second segment has large reddish yellow lateral spots, not quite reaching the hind border, The opaque black in the middle is very narrow, broader in front, and reaching across the segment in front of the indistinct yellow-brown hind border. The third segment with a large reddish- yellow spot on the sides, usually more reddish, than the second segment and with a narrow yellowish hind border. Across the middle, a shining baud with an opaque black spot in front and a similar colored band behind; In the female the yellow spots on the third segment are often smaller or wanting. The fourth segment has a shining cross-band in front, opaque behind and a broadly yellow posterior border.

Eristalis wing

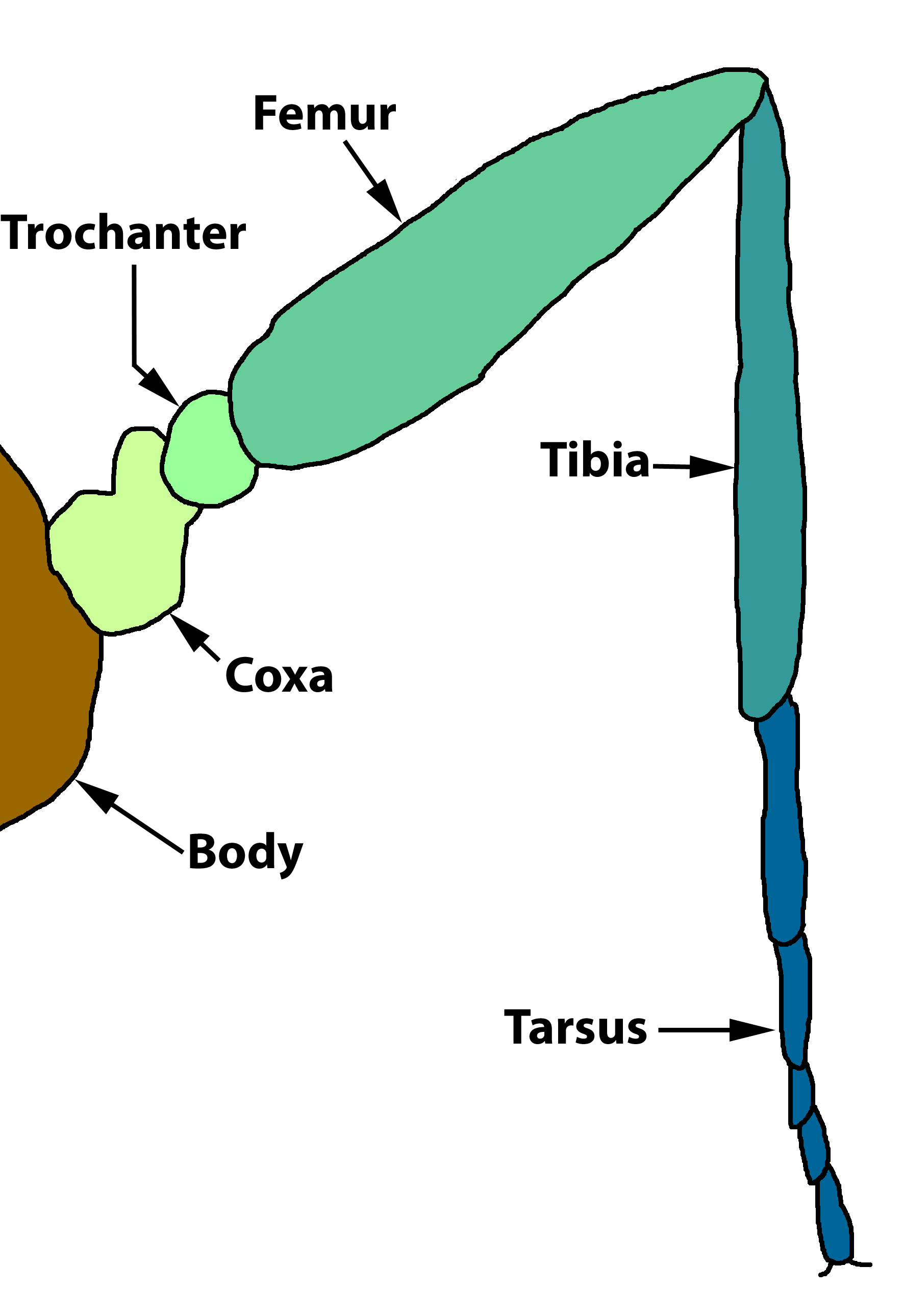
leg

Wings
Wings are hyaline except basal portion a little yellowish and they have a brownish tinge below the stigma.cell. Vein R1 is short petiolate and vein R4+5 distinctly sinuate. The spurious vein distinct.
Legs
The anterior and middle pairs yellowish or reddish, with the base of femora and tip of tibiae brownish. the hind femora considerably are dilated, usually broadly blackish, sometimes deep red.The distal half of hind tibiae is blackish.
