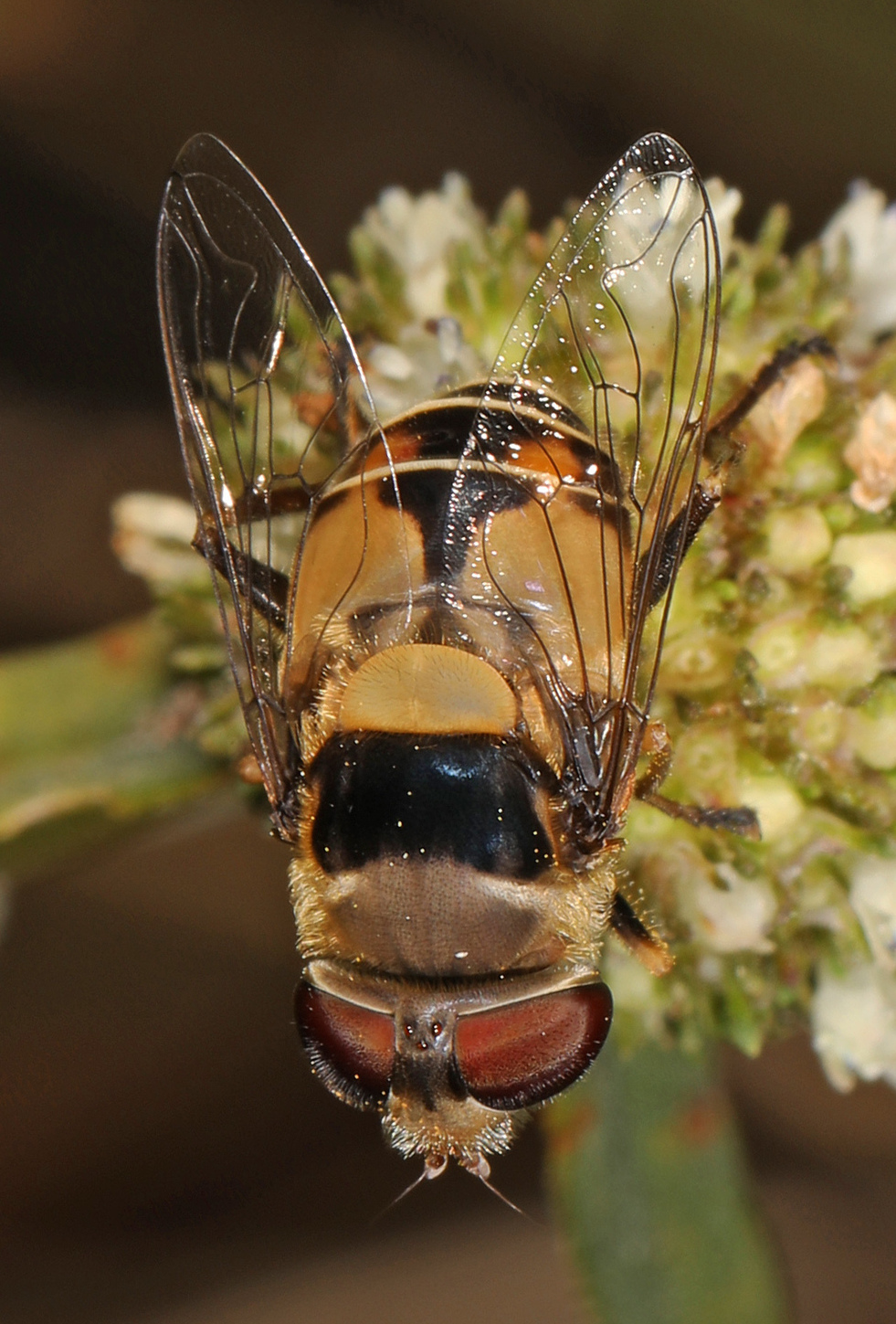

Scientific classification
- Kingdom: Animalia
- Phylum: Arthropoda
- Class: Insecta
- Order: Diptera
- Family: Syrphidae
- Genus: Palpada
- Species: P. pusilla

Binomial name
- Palpada pusilla (Macquart, 1842)

Synonyms
- Eristalis pusillus Macquart, 1842; Eristalis tricolor Jaennicke, 1867

= Palpada pusilla =

Species of fly

Palpada pusilla is a species of syrphid fly in the family Syrphidae.
