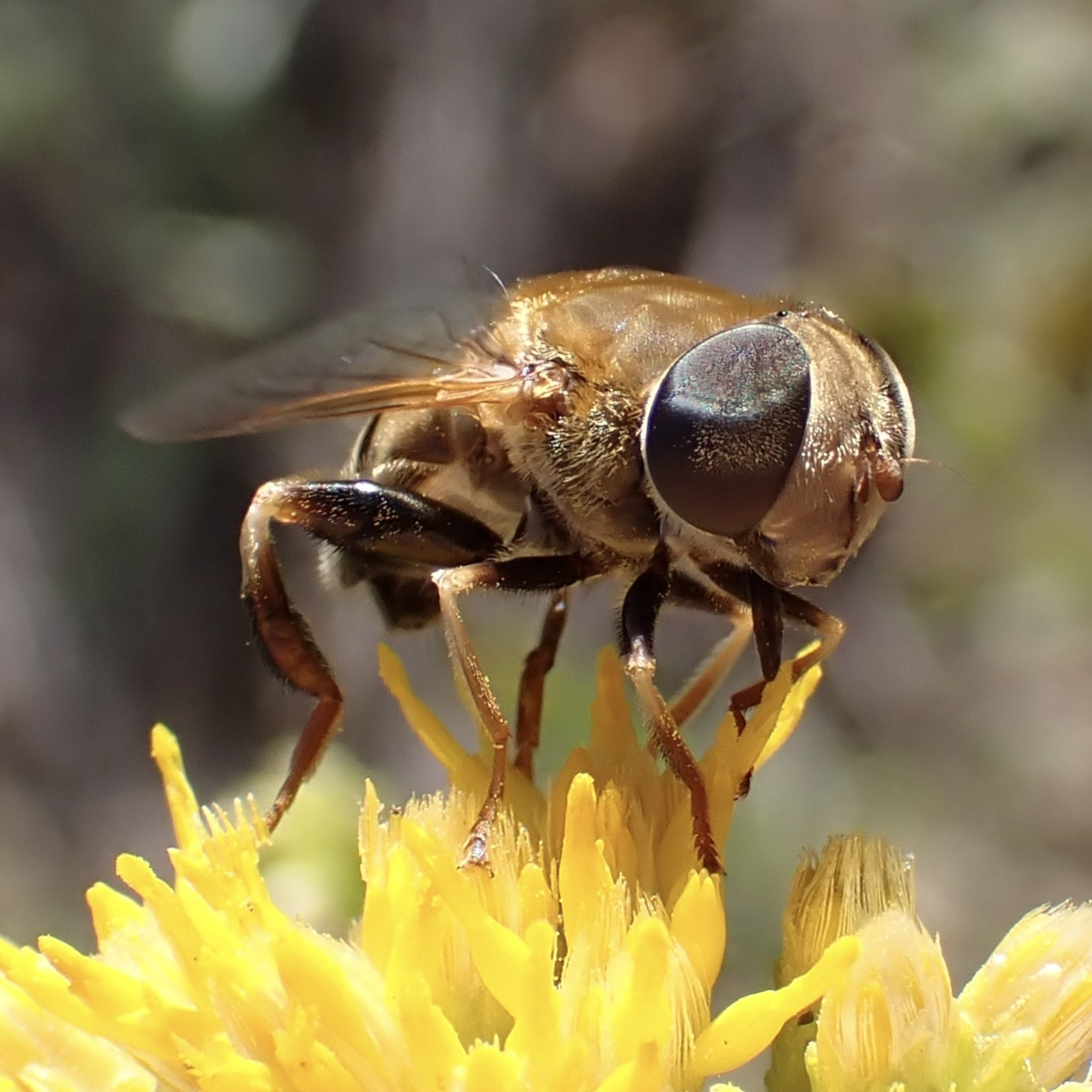

Scientific classification
- Kingdom: Animalia
- Phylum: Arthropoda
- Class: Insecta
- Order: Diptera
- Family: Syrphidae
- Genus: Palpada
- Species: P. mexicana

Binomial name
- Palpada mexicana (Macquart, 1847)

Synonyms
- Eristalis mexicanus Macquart, 1847; Eristalis testaceicornis Macquart, 1850; Eristalis tomentosus Macquart, 1850

= Palpada mexicana =

Species of fly

Palpada mexicana is a species of syrphid fly in the family Syrphidae.
