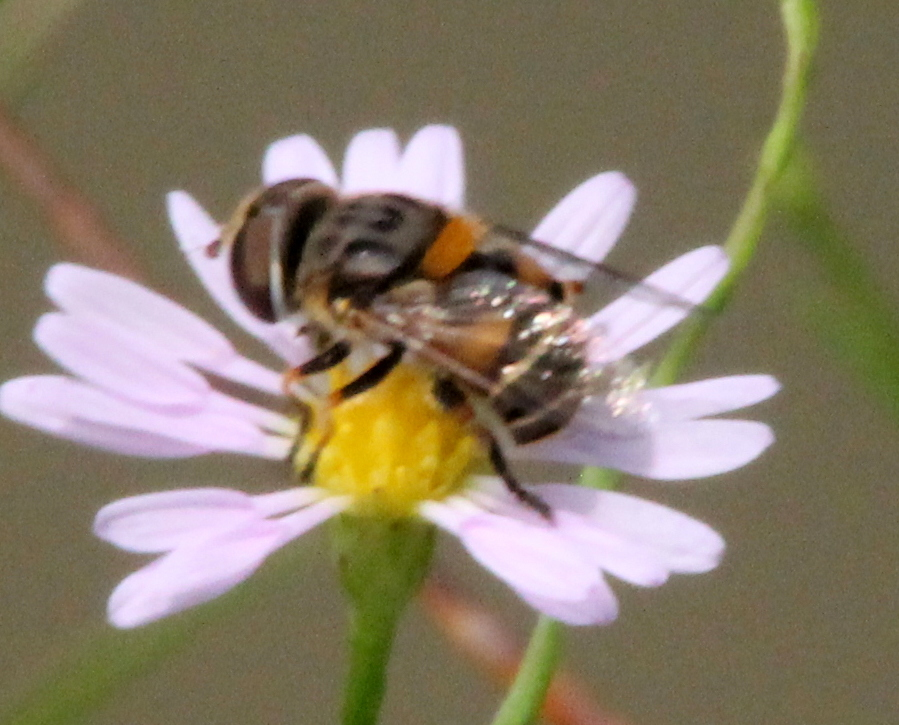

Scientific classification
- Domain: Eukaryota
- Kingdom: Animalia
- Phylum: Arthropoda
- Class: Insecta
- Order: Diptera
- Family: Syrphidae
- Genus: Palpada
- Species: P. texana

Binomial name
- Palpada texana (Hull, 1925)

Synonyms
- Eristalis duncani Curran, 1935; Eristalis texanus Hull, 1925

= Palpada texana =

Species of fly

Palpada texana is a species of syrphid fly in the family Syrphidae.
