= Xylota analis =

Scientific classification
- Kingdom: Animalia
- Phylum: Arthropoda
- Clade: Pancrustacea
- Class: Insecta
- Order: Diptera
- Family: Syrphidae
- Subfamily: Eristalinae
- Tribe: Milesiini
- Subtribe: Xylotina
- Genus: Xylota
- Species: X. analis

Binomial name
- Xylota analis Williston, 1887

Synonyms
- Xylota rainieri Shannon, 1926

Species of fly

Xylota analis is a species of hoverfly in the family Syrphidae.

== Distribution ==
Xylota analis is found throughout Canada and United States.
