= Xylota filipjevi =

Scientific classification
- Kingdom: Animalia
- Phylum: Arthropoda
- Clade: Pancrustacea
- Class: Insecta
- Order: Diptera
- Family: Syrphidae
- Subfamily: Eristalinae
- Tribe: Milesiini
- Subtribe: Xylotina
- Genus: Xylota
- Species: X. filipjevi

Binomial name
- Xylota filipjevi (Stackelberg, 1952)

Synonyms
- Zelima filipjevi Stackelberg, 1952

Species of fly

Xylota filipjevi is a species of hoverfly in the family Syrphidae.

== Distribution ==
Xylota filipjevi is found within Russia.
