= Xylota ejuncida =

Scientific classification
- Kingdom: Animalia
- Phylum: Arthropoda
- Clade: Pancrustacea
- Class: Insecta
- Order: Diptera
- Family: Syrphidae
- Subfamily: Eristalinae
- Tribe: Milesiini
- Subtribe: Xylotina
- Genus: Xylota
- Species: X. ejuncida

Binomial name
- Xylota ejuncida Say, 1824

Synonyms
- Xylota viridaenea Shannon, 1926

Species of fly

Xylota ejuncida , (Say, 1824), the Polished Leafwalker , is a rare species of syrphid fly observed in the eastern North America. Syrphid flies are also known as Hover Flies or Flower Flies because the adults are frequently found hovering around flowers from which they feed on nectar and pollen. Adults are 9.6–10.9 mm (0.38–0.43 in) long. The larvae of this genus live under bark in sap runs.

== Distribution ==
Xylota ejuncida is found throughout Canada and the United States.
