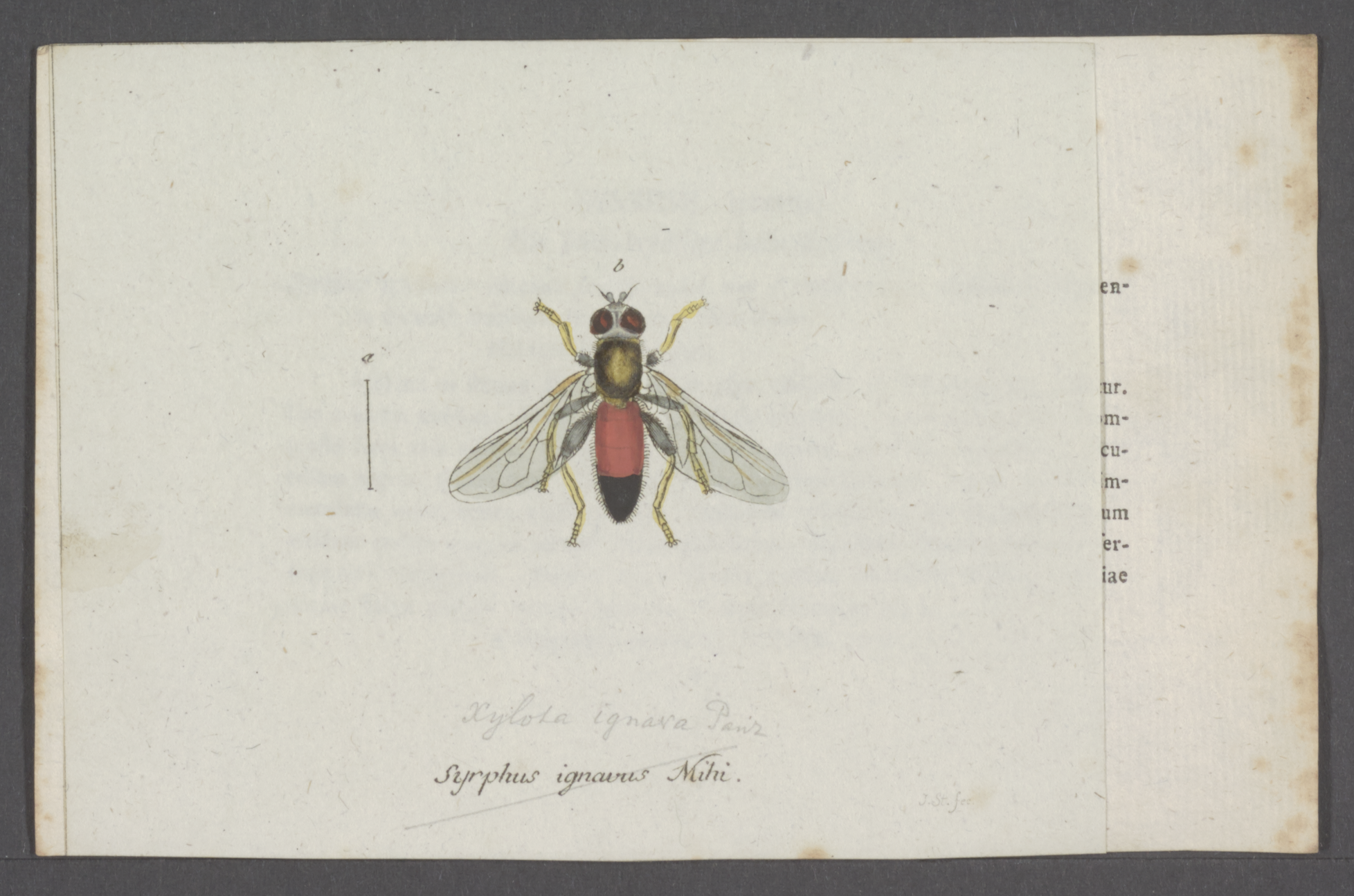
- Xylota Ignava

Scientific classification
- Kingdom: Animalia
- Phylum: Arthropoda
- Clade: Pancrustacea
- Class: Insecta
- Order: Diptera
- Family: Syrphidae
- Subfamily: Eristalinae
- Tribe: Milesiini
- Subtribe: Xylotina
- Genus: Xylota
- Species: X. ignava

Binomial name
- Xylota ignava (Panzer, 1798)

Synonyms
- Syrphus ignavus Panzer, 1798; Xylota basalis Matsumura, 1911; Musca pigra Schrank, 1803; Xylota inermis Becker, 1921

= Xylota ignava =

Species of fly

Xylota ignava is a species of hoverfly in the family Syrphidae.

== Distribution ==
This species is common in Europe.
