= Xylota pectinatus =

Scientific classification
- Kingdom: Animalia
- Phylum: Arthropoda
- Clade: Pancrustacea
- Class: Insecta
- Order: Diptera
- Family: Syrphidae
- Subfamily: Eristalinae
- Tribe: Milesiini
- Subtribe: Xylotina
- Genus: Xylota
- Species: X. pectinatus

Binomial name
- Xylota pectinatus (Hippa, 1985)

Synonyms
- Brachypalpoides pectinatus Hippa, 1985

Species of fly

Xylota pectinatus is a species of hoverfly in the family Syrphidae.

== Distribution ==
Xylota pectinatus is found distributed within Myanmar.
