= Xylota caeruleiventris =

Scientific classification
- Kingdom: Animalia
- Phylum: Arthropoda
- Clade: Pancrustacea
- Class: Insecta
- Order: Diptera
- Family: Syrphidae
- Subfamily: Eristalinae
- Tribe: Milesiini
- Subtribe: Xylotina
- Genus: Xylota
- Species: X. caeruleiventris

Binomial name
- Xylota caeruleiventris Zetterstedt, 1838

Synonyms
- Xylota pseudoignava Mutin, 1984; Xylota crepera He & Chu, 1992

Species of fly

Xylota caeruleiventris is a species of hoverfly in the family Syrphidae.

== Distribution ==
Xylota caeruleiventris is found throughout Sweden.
