= Xylota planiformis =

Scientific classification
- Kingdom: Animalia
- Phylum: Arthropoda
- Clade: Pancrustacea
- Class: Insecta
- Order: Diptera
- Family: Syrphidae
- Subfamily: Eristalinae
- Tribe: Milesiini
- Subtribe: Xylotina
- Genus: Xylota
- Species: X. planiformis

Binomial name
- Xylota planiformis (Hull, 1941)

Synonyms
- Planes planiformis Hull, 1941; Hovaxylota malagasya Keiser, 1971

Species of fly

Xylota planiformis is a species of hoverfly in the family Syrphidae.

== Distribution ==
Xylota planiformis can be found in Madagascar.
