= Xylota ferratus =

Scientific classification
- Kingdom: Animalia
- Phylum: Arthropoda
- Clade: Pancrustacea
- Class: Insecta
- Order: Diptera
- Family: Syrphidae
- Subfamily: Eristalinae
- Tribe: Milesiini
- Subtribe: Xylotina
- Genus: Xylota
- Species: X. ferratus

Binomial name
- Xylota ferratus (Hippa, 1985)

Synonyms
- Brachypalpoides ferratus Hippa, 1985

Species of fly

Xylota ferratus is a species of hoverfly in the family Syrphidae.

== Distribution ==
Xylota ferratus is found within Myanmar.
