= Xylota nigroaenescens =

Scientific classification
- Kingdom: Animalia
- Phylum: Arthropoda
- Clade: Pancrustacea
- Class: Insecta
- Order: Diptera
- Family: Syrphidae
- Subfamily: Eristalinae
- Tribe: Milesiini
- Subtribe: Xylotina
- Genus: Xylota
- Species: X. nigroaenescens

Binomial name
- Xylota nigroaenescens Rondani, 1875

Synonyms
- Xylota strigata Meijere, 1914; Xylota petulans Curran, 1928

Species of fly

Xylota nigroaenescens is a species of hoverfly in the family Syrphidae.

== Distribution ==
Xylota nigroaenescens is found across the Malay Archipelago, including Borneo, Java, Malaysia and Sumatra.
