= Xylota semulater =

Scientific classification
- Kingdom: Animalia
- Phylum: Arthropoda
- Clade: Pancrustacea
- Class: Insecta
- Order: Diptera
- Family: Syrphidae
- Subfamily: Eristalinae
- Tribe: Milesiini
- Subtribe: Xylotina
- Genus: Xylota
- Species: X. semulater

Binomial name
- Xylota semulater (Harris, 1780)

Synonyms
- Musca semulater Harris, 1780; Musca simulator Harris, 1780

Species of fly

Xylota semulater is a species of hoverfly in the family Syrphidae.

== Distribution ==
Xylota semulater is found distributed within England.
