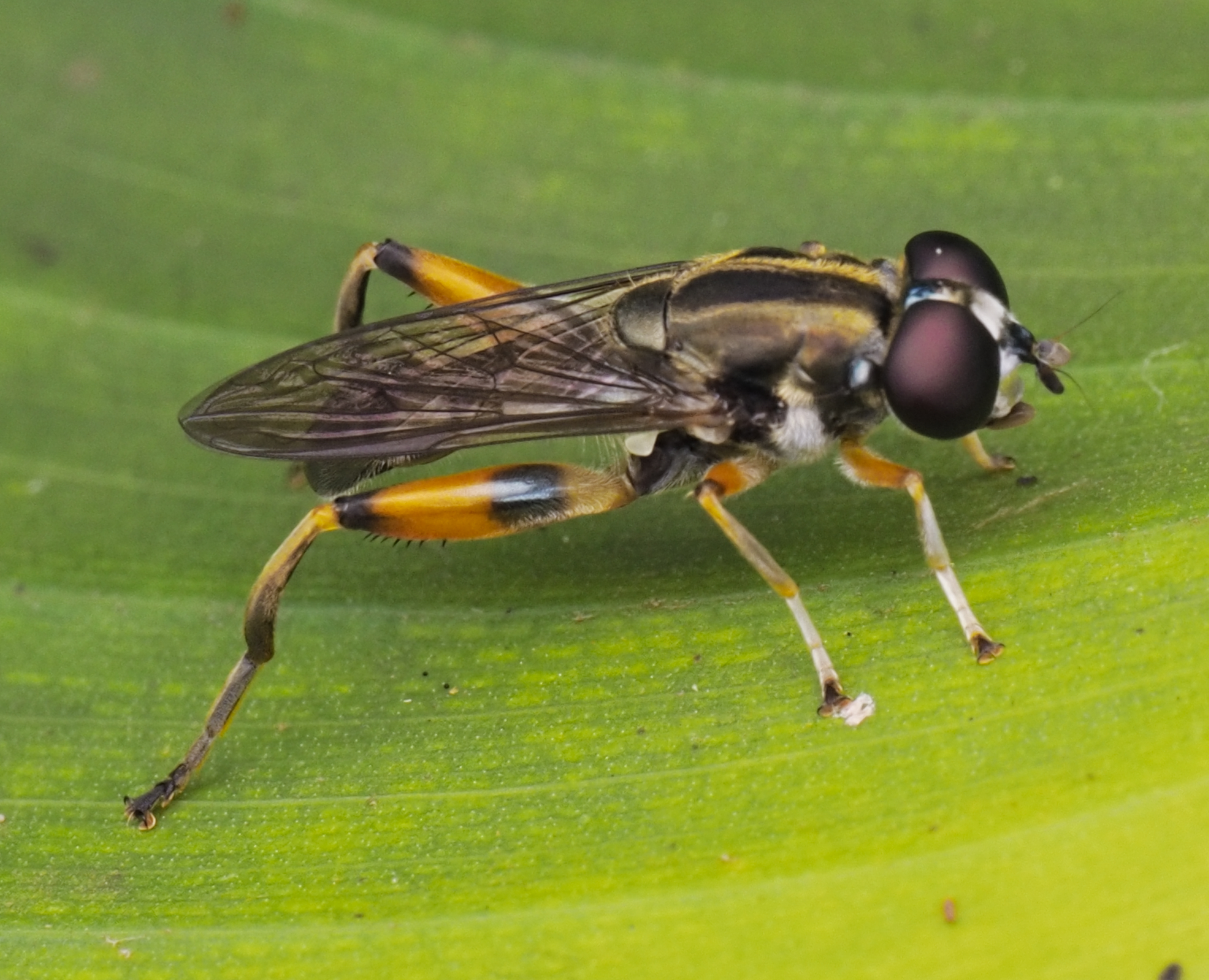

Scientific classification
- Kingdom: Animalia
- Phylum: Arthropoda
- Clade: Pancrustacea
- Class: Insecta
- Order: Diptera
- Family: Syrphidae
- Subfamily: Eristalinae
- Tribe: Milesiini
- Subtribe: Xylotina
- Genus: Xylota
- Species: X. bistriata

Binomial name
- Xylota bistriata Brunetti, 1915

= Xylota bistriata =

Species of fly

Xylota bistriata is a species of hoverfly in the family Syrphidae.

== Distribution ==
The species is known from the Western Ghats of India.
