= Xylota danieli =

Scientific classification
- Kingdom: Animalia
- Phylum: Arthropoda
- Clade: Pancrustacea
- Class: Insecta
- Order: Diptera
- Family: Syrphidae
- Subfamily: Eristalinae
- Tribe: Milesiini
- Subtribe: Xylotina
- Genus: Xylota
- Species: X. danieli

Binomial name
- Xylota danieli Mutin & Ichige, 2014

Species of fly

Xylota danieli is a species of hoverfly in the family Syrphidae.

== Distribution ==
Xylota danieli has a wide distribution ranging from Russia to Japan.
