= Xylota naknek =

Scientific classification
- Kingdom: Animalia
- Phylum: Arthropoda
- Clade: Pancrustacea
- Class: Insecta
- Order: Diptera
- Family: Syrphidae
- Subfamily: Eristalinae
- Tribe: Milesiini
- Subtribe: Xylotina
- Genus: Xylota
- Species: X. naknek

Binomial name
- Xylota naknek Shannon, 1926

Synonyms
- Xylota atlantica Shannon, 1926; Heliophilus mixtus Curran, 1941

Species of fly

Xylota naknek (Shannon, 1926), the Naknek Leafwalker , is a fairly common species of syrphid fly observed across Canada and the Northeastern United States. Syrphid flies are also known as Hover Flies or Flower Flies because the adults are frequently found hovering around flowers from which they feed on nectar and pollen. Adults are 9.1–12.8 mm (0.36–0.50 in) long. The larvae of this genus live under bark in sap runs.

== Distribution ==
Xylota naknek is found within Canada and the United States.

In Canada, this species occurs in British Columbia, Ontario, New Brunswick, Nova Scotia, Manitoba, and Quebec.

In the United States, it is found in Alaska, Wisconsin, New Hampshire, California, Oregon, Washington, and Minnesota.
