= Xylota scutellarmata =

Scientific classification
- Kingdom: Animalia
- Phylum: Arthropoda
- Clade: Pancrustacea
- Class: Insecta
- Order: Diptera
- Family: Syrphidae
- Subfamily: Eristalinae
- Tribe: Milesiini
- Subtribe: Xylotina
- Genus: Xylota
- Species: X. scutellarmata

Binomial name
- Xylota scutellarmata Lovett, 1919

Species of fly

Xylota scutellarmata is a species of hoverfly in the family Syrphidae.

== Distribution ==
Xylota scutellarmata is found distributed within the United States.
