= Xylota heinrichi =

Scientific classification
- Kingdom: Animalia
- Phylum: Arthropoda
- Clade: Pancrustacea
- Class: Insecta
- Order: Diptera
- Family: Syrphidae
- Subfamily: Eristalinae
- Tribe: Milesiini
- Subtribe: Xylotina
- Genus: Xylota
- Species: X. heinrichi

Binomial name
- Xylota heinrichi (Hippa, 1986)

Synonyms
- Hovaxylota heinrichi Hippa, 1986

Species of fly

Xylota heinrichi is a species of hoverfly in the family Syrphidae.

== Distribution ==
Xylota heinrichi is found in within Tanzania.
