= Xylota suecica =

Scientific classification
- Kingdom: Animalia
- Phylum: Arthropoda
- Clade: Pancrustacea
- Class: Insecta
- Order: Diptera
- Family: Syrphidae
- Subfamily: Eristalinae
- Tribe: Milesiini
- Subtribe: Xylotina
- Genus: Xylota
- Species: X. suecica

Binomial name
- Xylota suecica (Ringdahl, 1943)

Synonyms
- Zelima suecica Ringdahl, 1943

Species of fly

Xylota suecica is a species of hoverfly in the family Syrphidae.

== Distribution ==
Xylota suecica is found distributed across the nation of Sweden.
