= Xylota pendleburyi =

Scientific classification
- Kingdom: Animalia
- Phylum: Arthropoda
- Clade: Pancrustacea
- Class: Insecta
- Order: Diptera
- Family: Syrphidae
- Subfamily: Eristalinae
- Tribe: Milesiini
- Subtribe: Xylotina
- Genus: Xylota
- Species: X. pendleburyi

Binomial name
- Xylota pendleburyi Curran, 1928

Species of fly

Xylota pendleburyi is a species of hoverfly in the family Syrphidae.

== Distribution ==
Xylota pendleburyi is found within Borneo and Malaysia.
