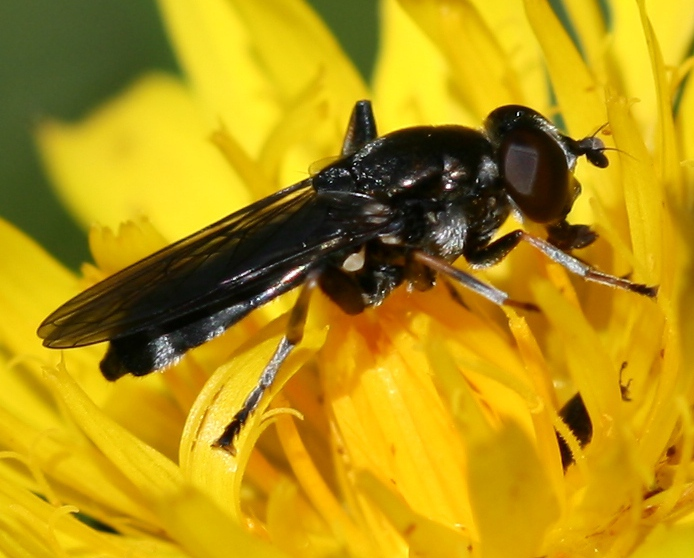

Scientific classification
- Kingdom: Animalia
- Phylum: Arthropoda
- Clade: Pancrustacea
- Class: Insecta
- Order: Diptera
- Family: Syrphidae
- Subfamily: Eristalinae
- Tribe: Milesiini
- Subtribe: Xylotina
- Genus: Xylota
- Species: X. jakutorum

Binomial name
- Xylota jakutorum Bagachanova, 1980

= Xylota jakutorum =

Genus of flies

Xylota jakutorum is a Palearctic species of hoverfly.

== Description ==
External images For terms see Morphology of Diptera
Antero-dorsal hairs on the hind femora all shorter than half of the maximum depth of femur, longer hairs confined to the basal 1/5 of the femur length; posterior anepisternum dusted. Bartsch et al. figure the genitalia of jakutorum and the closely similar Xylota caeruleiventris Van Veen provides an identification key.

== Distribution ==
Fennoscandia South to the Pyrenees and Italy, Ireland East through Central Europe to European Russia and on to Siberia.

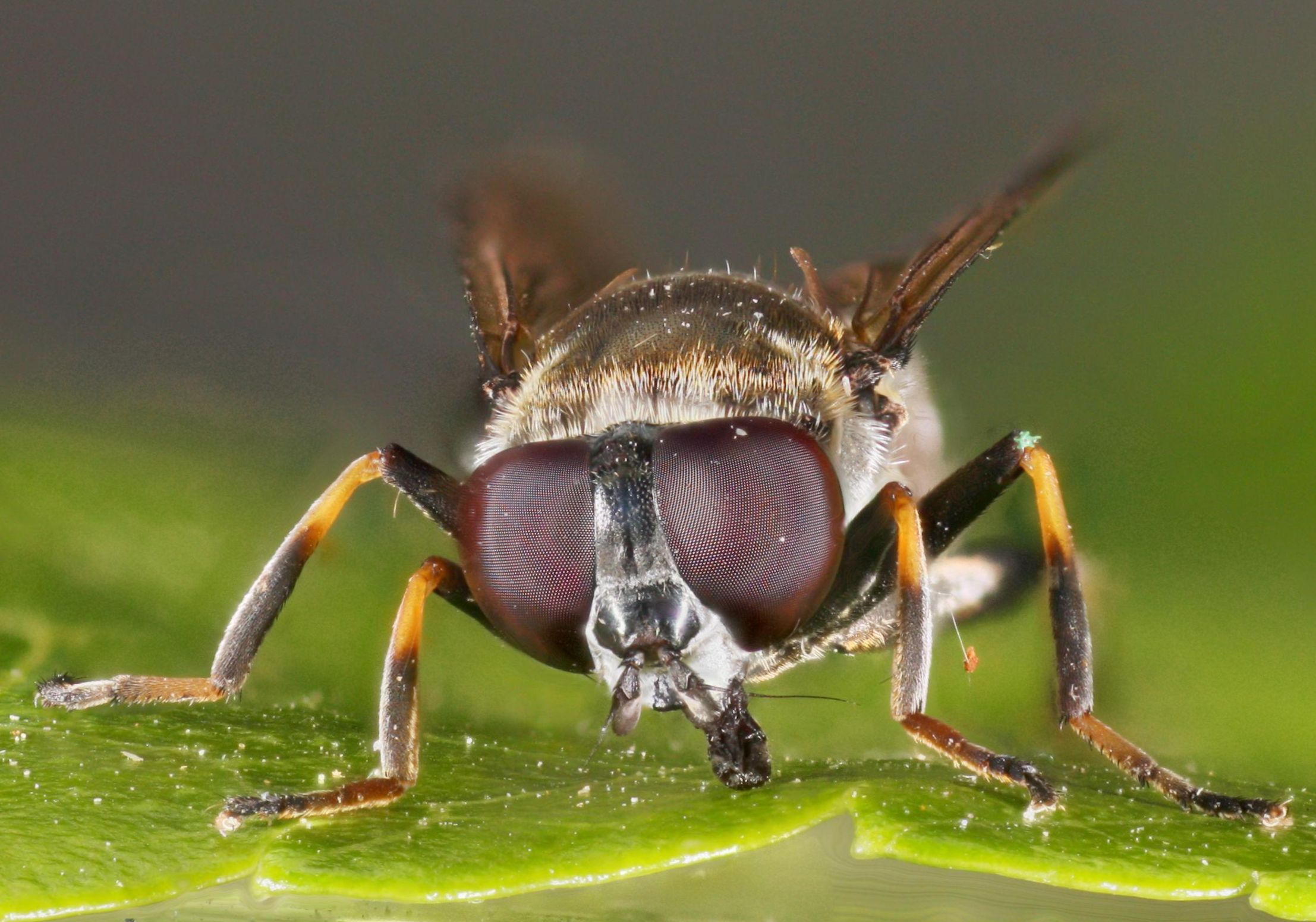

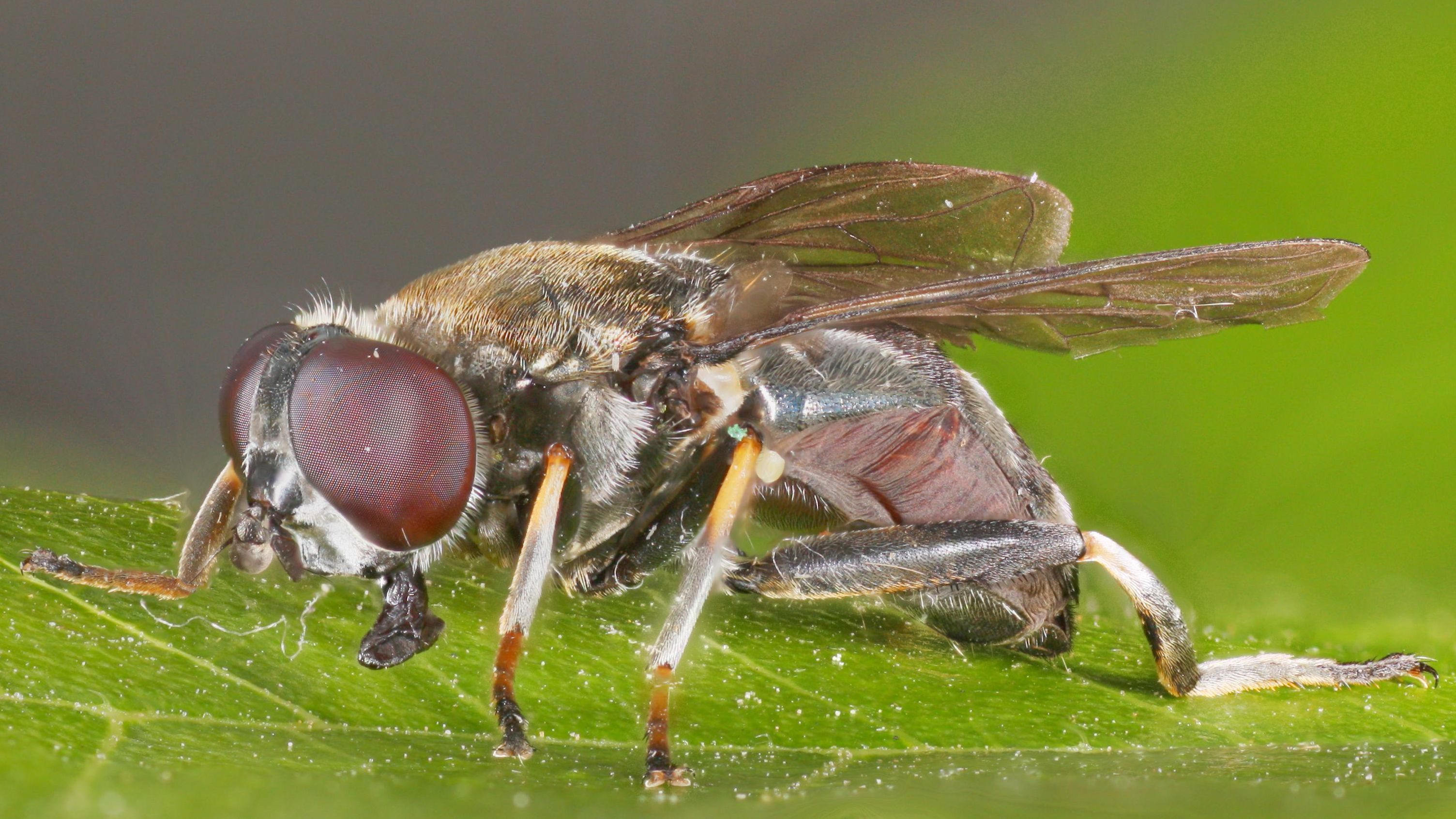
