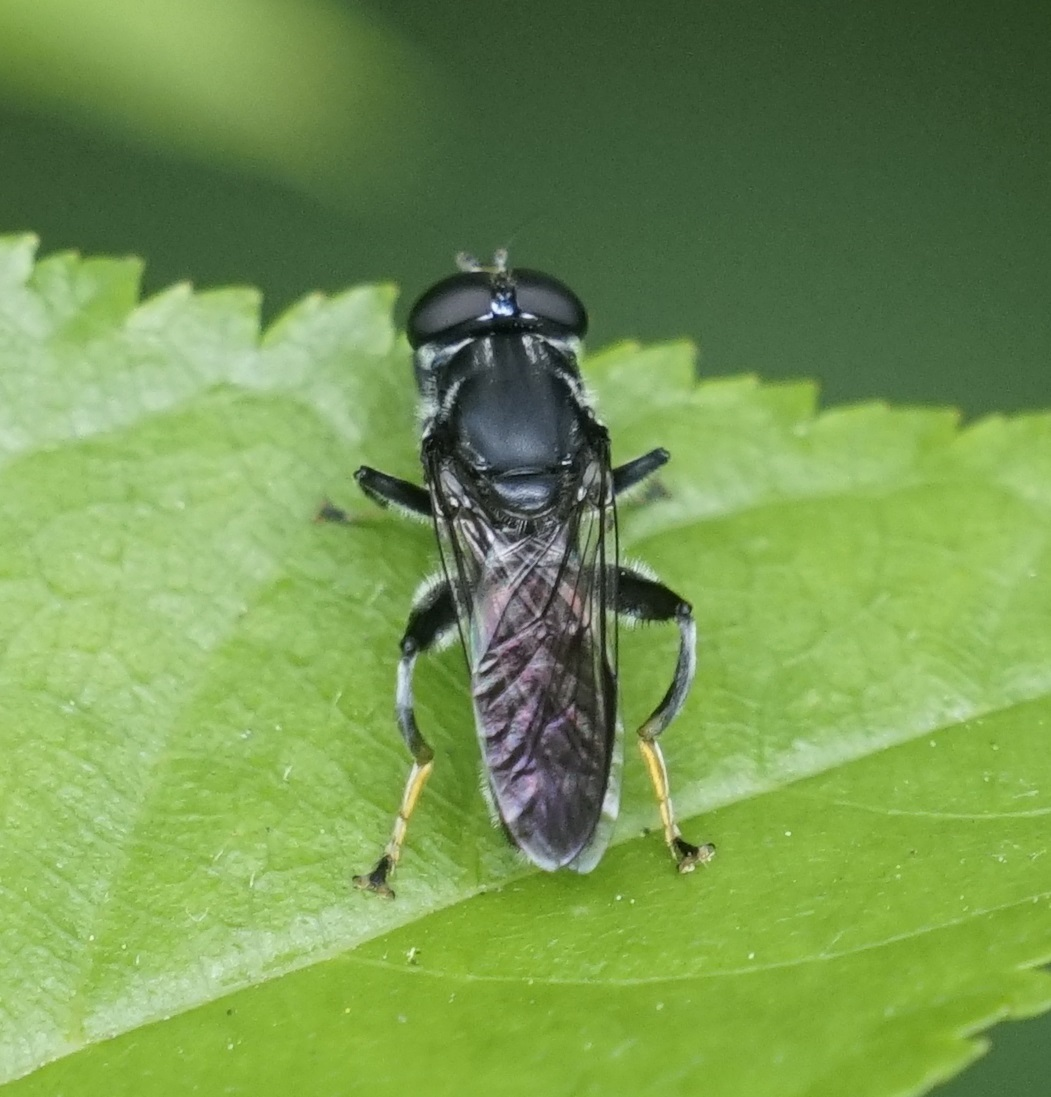

Scientific classification
- Kingdom: Animalia
- Phylum: Arthropoda
- Clade: Pancrustacea
- Class: Insecta
- Order: Diptera
- Family: Syrphidae
- Subfamily: Eristalinae
- Tribe: Milesiini
- Subtribe: Xylotina
- Genus: Xylota
- Species: X. flavitarsis

Binomial name
- Xylota flavitarsis Macquart, 1846

= Xylota flavitarsis =

Species of fly

Xylota flavitarsis is a species of hoverfly in the family Syrphidae.

== Distribution ==
The Xylota flavitarsis is distributed across the continent of Australia.
