= Xylota azurea =

Scientific classification
- Kingdom: Animalia
- Phylum: Arthropoda
- Clade: Pancrustacea
- Class: Insecta
- Order: Diptera
- Family: Syrphidae
- Subfamily: Eristalinae
- Tribe: Milesiini
- Subtribe: Xylotina
- Genus: Xylota
- Species: X. azurea

Binomial name
- Xylota azurea (Fluke, 1953)

Synonyms
- Heliophilus azurea Fluke, 1953

Species of fly

Xylota azurea is a species of hoverfly in the family Syrphidae.

== Distribution ==
Xylota azurea is found throughout Mexico and the United States.
