= Xylota plumipes =

Scientific classification
- Kingdom: Animalia
- Phylum: Arthropoda
- Clade: Pancrustacea
- Class: Insecta
- Order: Diptera
- Family: Syrphidae
- Subfamily: Eristalinae
- Tribe: Milesiini
- Subtribe: Xylotina
- Genus: Xylota
- Species: X. plumipes

Binomial name
- Xylota plumipes (Hippa, 1985)

Synonyms
- Brachypalpoides plumipes Hippa, 1985

Species of fly

Xylota plumipes is a species of hoverfly in the family Syrphidae.

== Distribution ==
Xylota plumipes is found within India.
