= Xylota nursei =

Scientific classification
- Kingdom: Animalia
- Phylum: Arthropoda
- Clade: Pancrustacea
- Class: Insecta
- Order: Diptera
- Family: Syrphidae
- Subfamily: Eristalinae
- Tribe: Milesiini
- Subtribe: Xylotina
- Genus: Xylota
- Species: X. nursei

Binomial name
- Xylota nursei Brunetti, 1923

Species of fly

Xylota nursei is a species of hoverfly in the family Syrphidae.

== Distribution ==
Xylota nursei is found within India.
