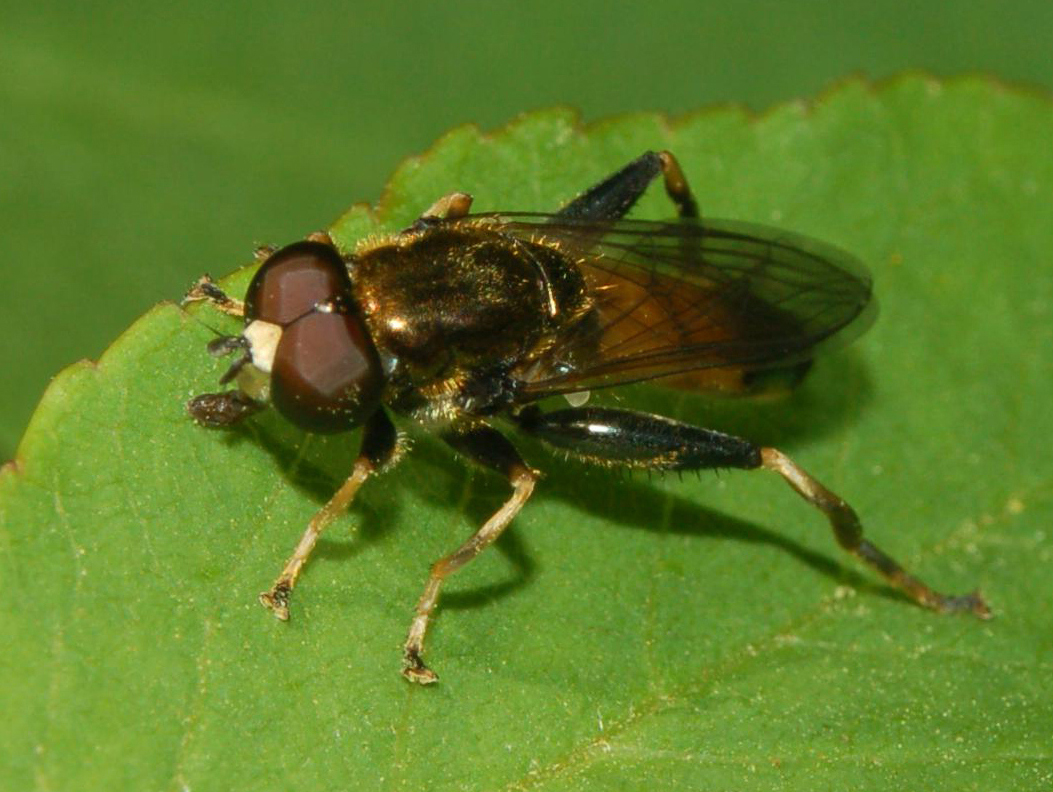
- Xylota segnis. Male showing the row of thorns on hind femora
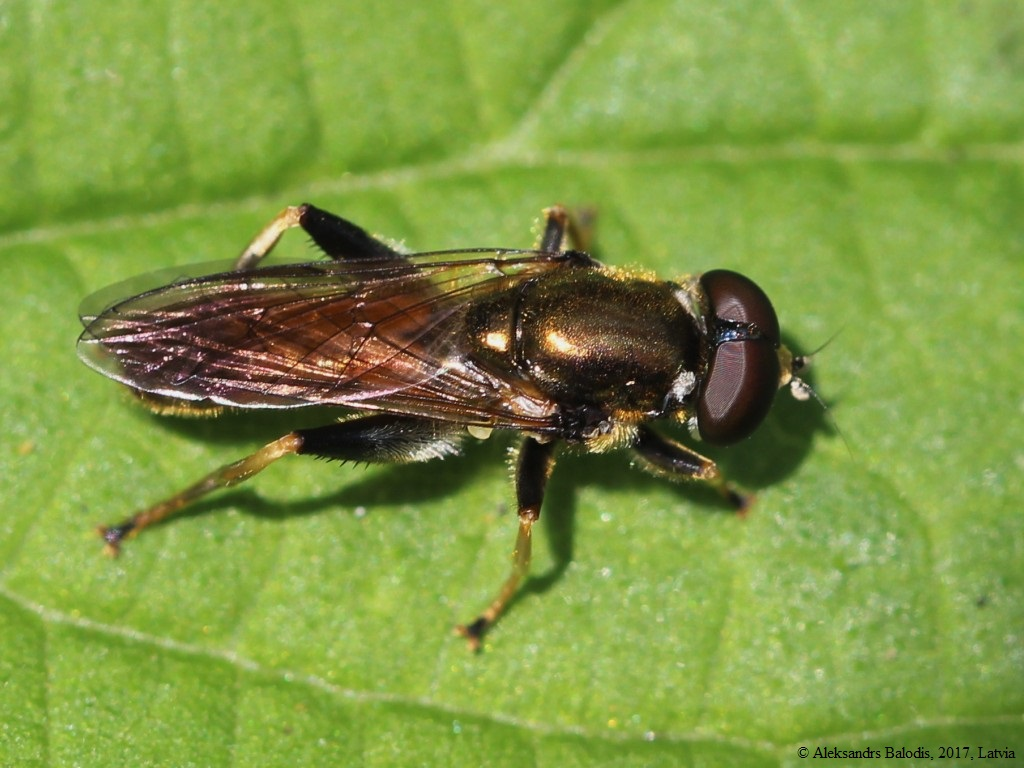
- Female

Scientific classification
- Kingdom: Animalia
- Phylum: Arthropoda
- Clade: Pancrustacea
- Class: Insecta
- Order: Diptera
- Family: Syrphidae
- Subfamily: Eristalinae
- Tribe: Milesiini
- Subtribe: Xylotina
- Genus: Xylota
- Species: X. segnis

Binomial name
- Xylota segnis (Linnaeus, 1758)

Synonyms
- Musca brassicaria Donovan, 1796; Musca fucata Harris, 1780; Musca segnis Linnaeus, 1758; Xylota brassicaria (Donovan, 1796); Musca contracta Geoffroy, 1785; Xylota fucata (Harris, 1780); Musca melanochrysa Gmelin, 1790; Musca maritima (Scopoli, 1763)

= Xylota segnis =

Genus of flies

Xylota segnis, the brown-toed forest fly, is a common species of hoverfly.

== Etymology ==
The genus name Xylota is the Latinized form of the rare Byzantine-Greek ξυλωτή [xsylōtē] meaning wooden, while the Latin species name segnis means slipping or lazy, as this hoverfly usually rests on a leaf and it does not fly frequently. The translation of the taxon could be "lazy wood fly".

== Distribution ==
This species has a Palearctic and Nearctic distribution. It is present in all Europe including the Mediterranean, the Caucasus and through Russia to the Russian Far East and Japan. It is also present in the Nearctic eastern parts, in southeastern Canada and northeastern United States. GBIF species page, with map

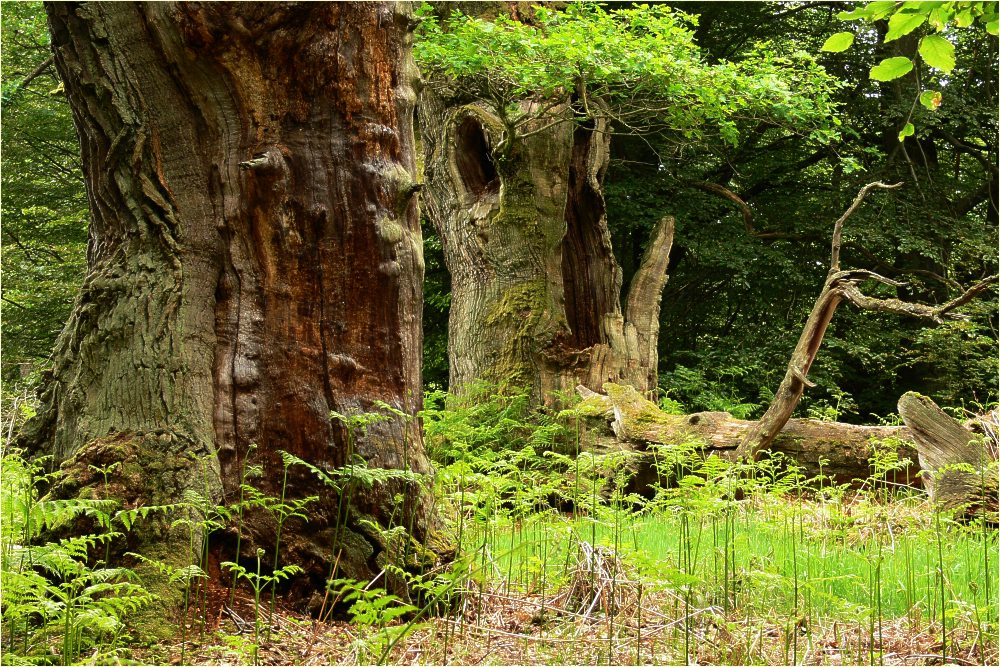
Habitat.Germany

== Habitat ==
This species mainly inhabits low bushes in woods.

== Description ==
External images For terms see Morphology of Diptera
Xylota segnis can reach a length of 10–14 millimetres (0.39–0.55 in) and has a wing length reaching 7–9.5 millimetres (0.28–0.37 in). Thorax is greenish black, with long yellowish hairs. Abdomen is black with a large red or yellowish red patch. In particular, tergites 2 and 3 are yellow or reddish except for the back of tergite 3 which is black. Two rows of long and thick spines are present on hind femora. The front and the hind legs are predominantly yellow, with black or dark brown femora. The compound eyes are reddish and antennae are dark. The wings are slightly brownish with a brown pterostigma, the halteres are light yellow. In males on the hind trochanters there is a long upcurved pointed process. The male genitalia are figured by Hippa (1968). The larva is illustrated in colour by Rotheray (1994) ). See references for determination.

== Biology ==
This species is polyvoltine, with up to three generations per year. Flight times last from April to September. Adults feed by grazing on anemophilous pollen grazed from surface of leaves. However these hoverflies rarely visits also flowers of various plants, for example Corylus avellana, Rubus idaeus, Euphorbia cyparissias, Aegopodium podagraria, Angelica sylvestris, Heracleum sphondylium, Cirsium arvense and Crataegus species. They also eat honey dew from aphids.

The larvae are normally associated with decaying tree sap, but have also been found in decaying human remains. The larvae overwinter and pupate in the spring.
