= Xylota novaeguineae =

Scientific classification
- Kingdom: Animalia
- Phylum: Arthropoda
- Clade: Pancrustacea
- Class: Insecta
- Order: Diptera
- Family: Syrphidae
- Subfamily: Eristalinae
- Tribe: Milesiini
- Subtribe: Xylotina
- Genus: Xylota
- Species: X. novaeguineae

Binomial name
- Xylota novaeguineae Hippa, 1978

Species of fly

Xylota novaeguineae is a species of hoverfly in the family Syrphidae.

== Distribution ==
Xylota novaeguineae is found within New Guinea.
