= Xylota flukei =

Scientific classification
- Kingdom: Animalia
- Phylum: Arthropoda
- Clade: Pancrustacea
- Class: Insecta
- Order: Diptera
- Family: Syrphidae
- Subfamily: Eristalinae
- Tribe: Milesiini
- Subtribe: Xylotina
- Genus: Xylota
- Species: X. flukei

Binomial name
- Xylota flukei Curran, 1941

Synonyms
- Heliophilus flukei Curran, 1941

Species of fly

Xylota flukei is a species of hoverfly in the family Syrphidae.

== Distribution ==
Xylota flukei is found throughout Canada and the United States.
