= Xylota hisamatsui =

Scientific classification
- Kingdom: Animalia
- Phylum: Arthropoda
- Clade: Pancrustacea
- Class: Insecta
- Order: Diptera
- Family: Syrphidae
- Subfamily: Eristalinae
- Tribe: Milesiini
- Subtribe: Xylotina
- Genus: Xylota
- Species: X. hisamatsui

Binomial name
- Xylota hisamatsui (Shiraki & Edashige, 1953)

Synonyms
- Zelima hisamatsui Shiraki & Edashige, 1953

Species of fly

Xylota hisamatsui is a species of hoverfly in the family Syrphidae.

== Distribution ==
Xylota hisamatsui is found within Japan.
