= Xylota nitidula =

Scientific classification
- Kingdom: Animalia
- Phylum: Arthropoda
- Clade: Pancrustacea
- Class: Insecta
- Order: Diptera
- Family: Syrphidae
- Subfamily: Eristalinae
- Tribe: Milesiini
- Subtribe: Xylotina
- Genus: Xylota
- Species: X. nitidula

Binomial name
- Xylota nitidula (Fluke, 1939)

Synonyms
- Heliophilus nitidula Fluke, 1939

Species of fly

Xylota nitidula is a species of hoverfly in the family Syrphidae.

== Distribution ==
Xylota nitidula is found within Mexico.
