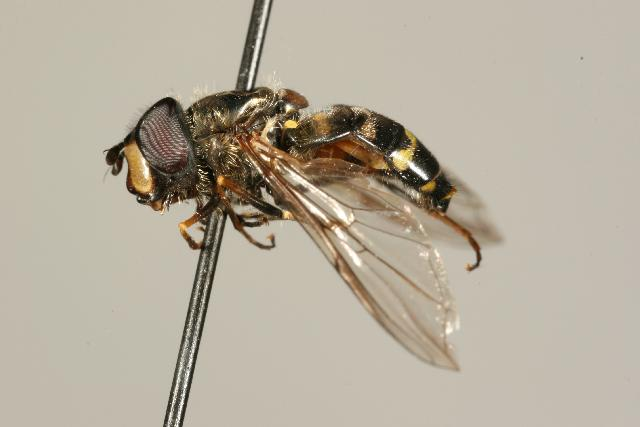

Scientific classification
- Kingdom: Animalia
- Phylum: Arthropoda
- Clade: Pancrustacea
- Class: Insecta
- Order: Diptera
- Family: Syrphidae
- Subfamily: Eristalinae
- Tribe: Milesiini
- Subtribe: Xylotina
- Genus: Xylota
- Species: X. flavifrons

Binomial name
- Xylota flavifrons Walker, 1849

Synonyms
- Xylota communis Walker, 1849; Xylota arcticus Curran, 1941; Xylota obscura Loew, 1866

= Xylota flavifrons =

Species of Syrphid fly

Xylota flavifrons, (Walker, 1849), commonly known as the northern leafwalker, is an uncommon species of syrphid fly observed in the northeastern United States and all across Canada. Syrphid flies are also known as hover flies or flower flies because the adults are frequently found hovering around flowers from which they feed on nectar and pollen. Adults are 9.4–14.7 mm (0.37–0.58 in) long. The larvae of this genus live under bark in sap runs.

== Distribution ==
The species is found in across Canada and the northeastern United States.
