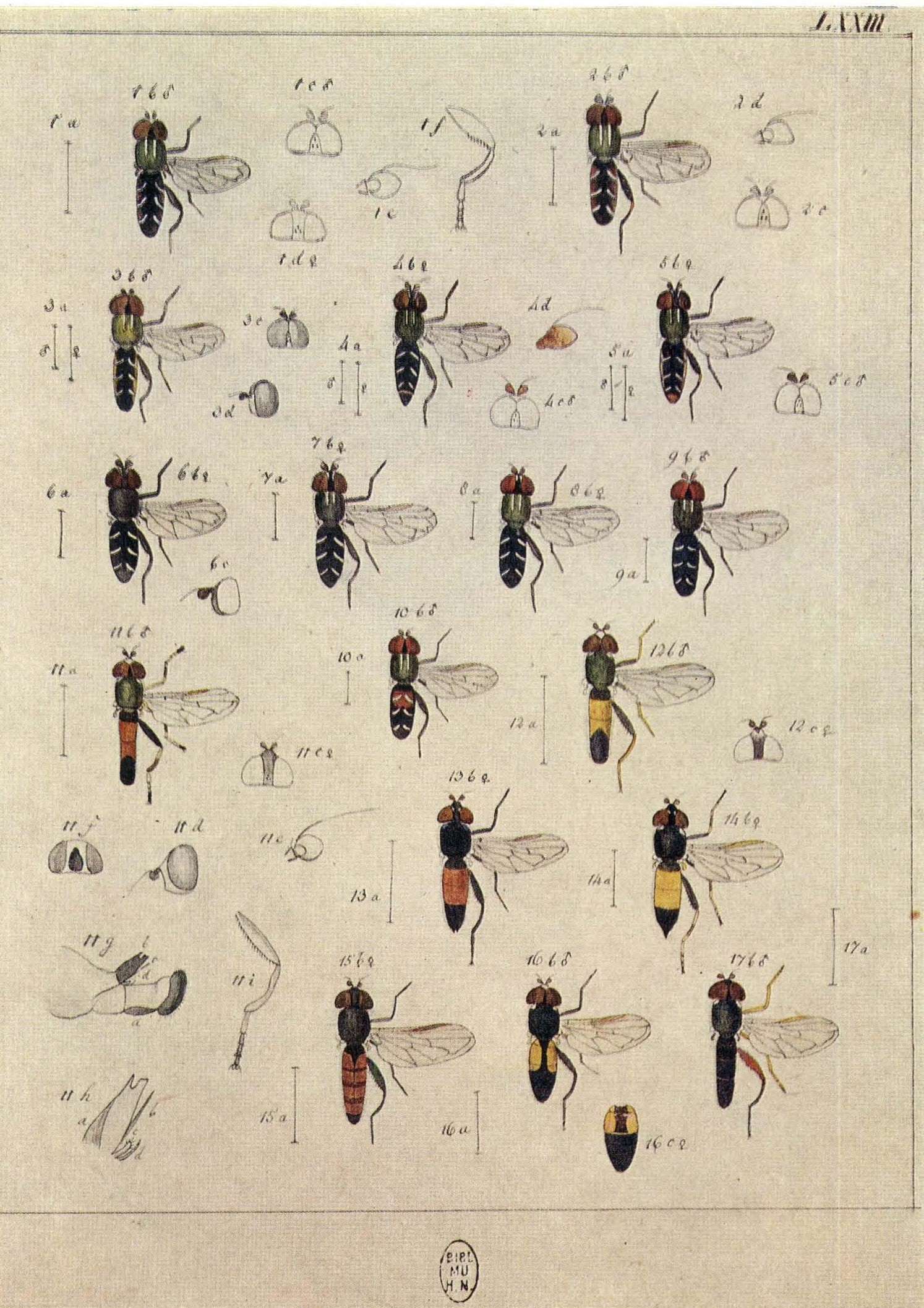
- Xylota tarda in Meigen Europäischen Zweiflügeligen (figure 16)

Scientific classification
- Kingdom: Animalia
- Phylum: Arthropoda
- Clade: Pancrustacea
- Class: Insecta
- Order: Diptera
- Family: Syrphidae
- Subfamily: Eristalinae
- Tribe: Milesiini
- Subtribe: Xylotina
- Genus: Xylota
- Species: X. tarda

Binomial name
- Xylota tarda Meigen, 1822

Synonyms
- Xylota arboris He & Chu, 1992; Xylota confinis Zetterstedt, 1843; Xylota confluens Zetterstedt, 1849

= Xylota tarda =

Species of fly

Xylota tarda is a Palearctic species of hoverfly.

== Description ==
Wing length 5·5-8·5 mm. Large red areas on black abdomen. Wing membrane not infuscated. Dorso-apical white bristle on metatarsus 1. Antero-dorsal pale hairs on the basal half of femur 3 uniform not longer than 1/4 the depth of femur. The male genitalia are figured by Hippa (1968). The larva is illustrated in colour by Rotheray (1994) ).

See references for determination (but see Speight for contradiction)

== Distribution ==
Xylota tarda is found across the Palearctic and Fennoscandia regions.

Spain, Northern Italy (Apennines) Slovenia. Ireland East through Central Europe into European Russia and the Caucasus then through Russia to Siberia and the Pacific coast (Kuril islands).

== Biology ==
Old woodland species running on the foliage of bushes and shrubs and on tree stumps and nearby bare ground. The larva has been found in sap runs at the base of the trunk of Populus tremula and in rotting wood of Fagus.
