= Xylota conformis =

Scientific classification
- Kingdom: Animalia
- Phylum: Arthropoda
- Clade: Pancrustacea
- Class: Insecta
- Order: Diptera
- Family: Syrphidae
- Subfamily: Eristalinae
- Tribe: Milesiini
- Subtribe: Xylotina
- Genus: Xylota
- Species: X. conformis

Binomial name
- Xylota conformis Walker, 1857

Species of fly

Xylota conformis is a species of hoverfly in the family Syrphidae.

== Distribution ==
Xylota conformis is found throughout Malaysia and the Philippines.
