= Xylota lovetti =

Scientific classification
- Kingdom: Animalia
- Phylum: Arthropoda
- Clade: Pancrustacea
- Class: Insecta
- Order: Diptera
- Family: Syrphidae
- Subfamily: Eristalinae
- Tribe: Milesiini
- Subtribe: Xylotina
- Genus: Xylota
- Species: X. lovetti

Binomial name
- Xylota lovetti Curran, 1925

Synonyms
- Xylota oregona Curran, 1925; Xylota bivittata Lovett, 1920

Species of fly

Xylota lovetti is a species of hoverfly in the family Syrphidae.

== Distribution ==
Xylota lovetti is found within Canada and United States.
