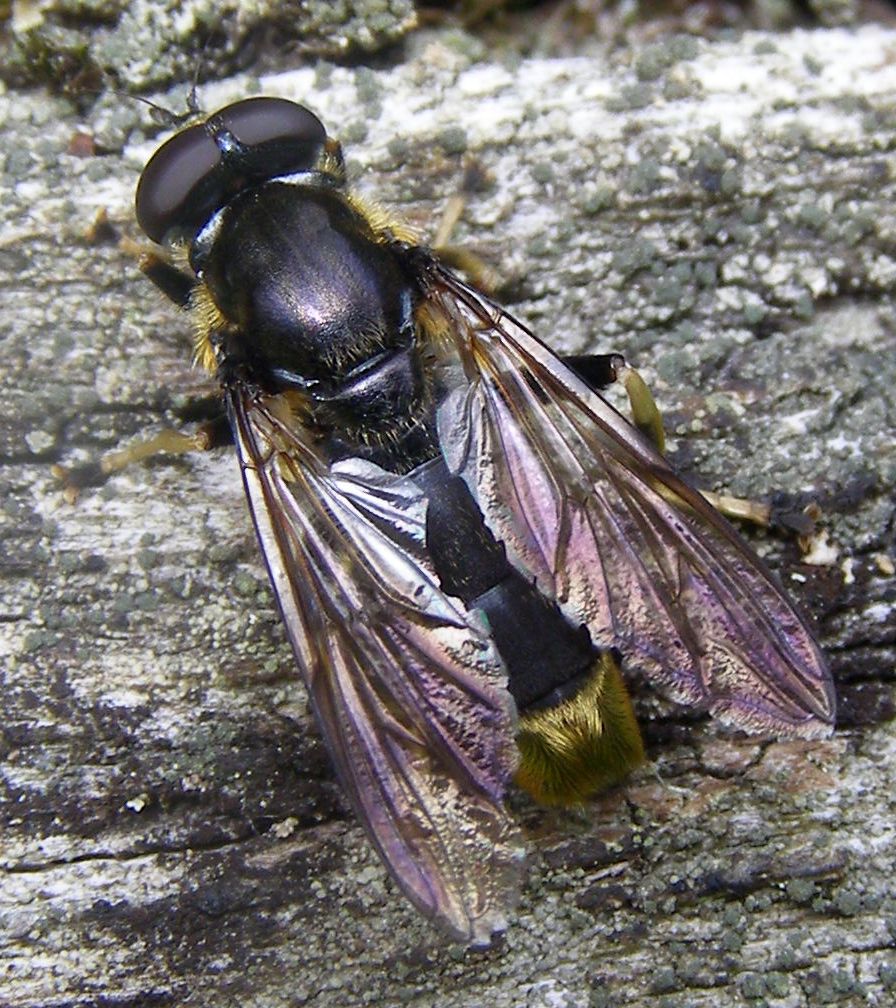

Scientific classification
- Kingdom: Animalia
- Phylum: Arthropoda
- Clade: Pancrustacea
- Class: Insecta
- Order: Diptera
- Family: Syrphidae
- Subfamily: Eristalinae
- Tribe: Milesiini
- Subtribe: Xylotina
- Genus: Xylota
- Species: X. sylvarum

Binomial name
- Xylota sylvarum (Linnaeus, 1758)

Synonyms
- Musca longisco Harris, 1780; Musca sylvarum Linnaeus, 1758; Xylota longisco (Harris, 1780); Syrphus impiger Rossi, 1790; Musca silvarum Hoslin, 1782

= Xylota sylvarum =

Genus of flies

Xylota sylvarum is a common Palearctic species of hoverfly.

== Description ==
Wing length 9–12 mm. Thorax blackish. Four anterior legs partly yellow. Abdomen black with golden patches (adpressed golden hair). The male genitalia are figured by Hippa (1968). The larva is illustrated in colour by Rotheray (1994) ). See references for determination.

== Distribution ==
Palearctic Fennoscandia South to Iberia. Ireland eastwards through North Europe on to Siberia and the Pacific coast.

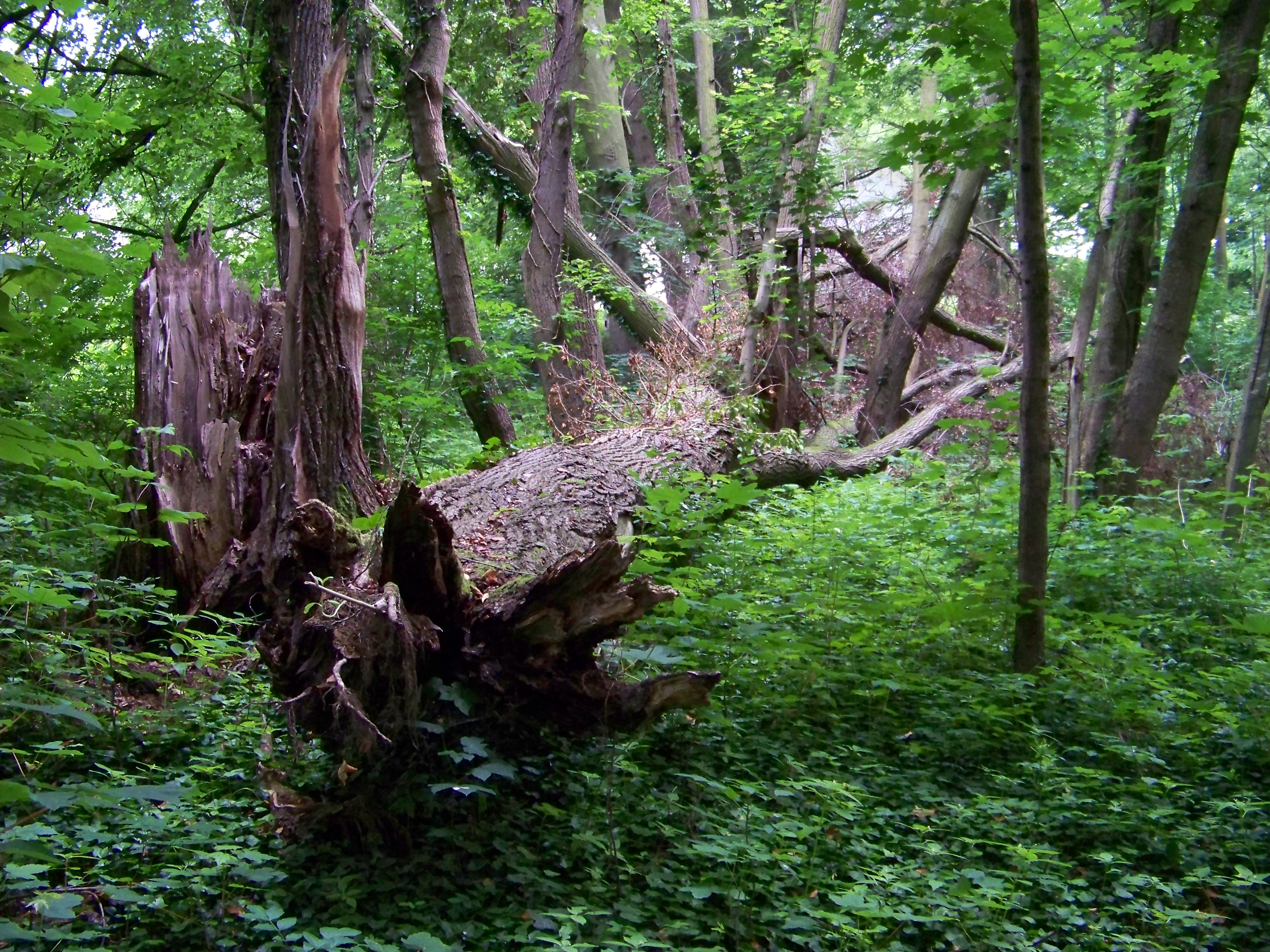
Habitat.Czech Republic

== Biology ==
Old woodland species running on the foliage of bushes and shrubs and on tree stumps. The larvae feed in damp, fungus-ridden decaying wood of Abies, Fagus and Quercus trunks and stumps, usually beneath the bark. The major habitat may be decaying tree roots...
