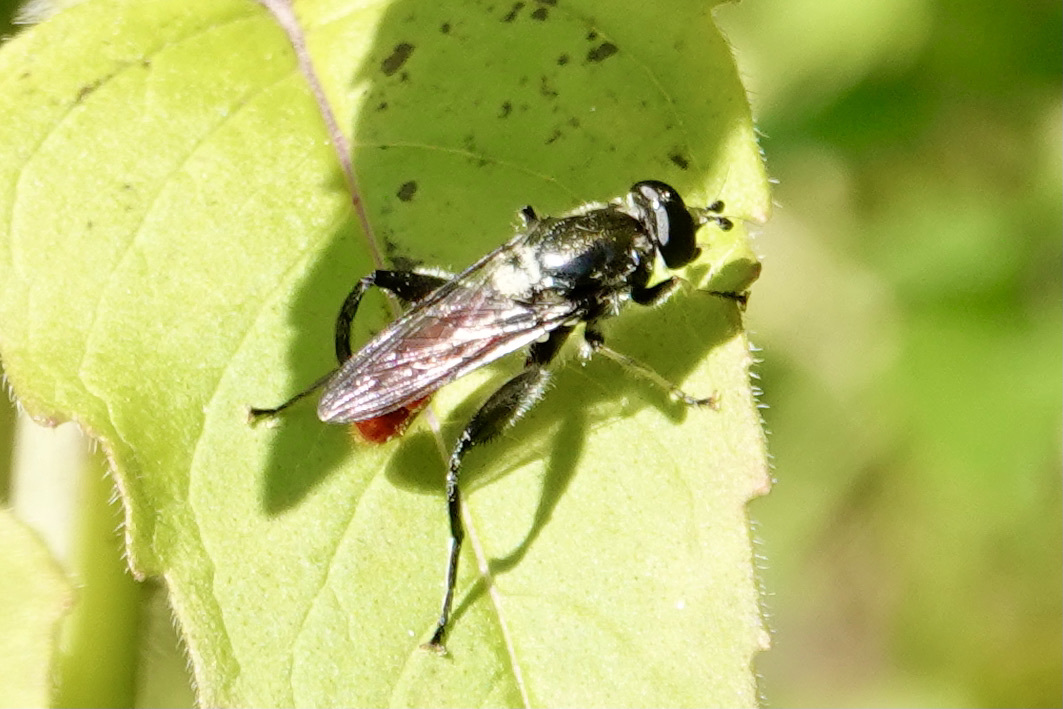

Scientific classification
- Kingdom: Animalia
- Phylum: Arthropoda
- Clade: Pancrustacea
- Class: Insecta
- Order: Diptera
- Family: Syrphidae
- Subfamily: Eristalinae
- Tribe: Milesiini
- Subtribe: Xylotina
- Genus: Xylota
- Species: X. bicolor

Binomial name
- Xylota bicolor Loew, 1864

= Xylota bicolor =

Species of fly

Xylota bicolor , (Loew, 1864), the Eastern Orange-tailed Leafwalker , is a rare species of syrphid fly observed across the eastern half of North America. Syrphid flies are also known as Hover Flies or Flower Flies because the adults are frequently found hovering around flowers from which they feed on nectar and pollen. Adults are 13.8–14.7 mm (0.54–0.58 in) in length, black with an orange abdomen The larvae of this genus live under bark in sap runs.

== Distribution ==
Xylota bicolor is found throughout Canada and the United States.
