= Xylota dolini =

Scientific classification
- Kingdom: Animalia
- Phylum: Arthropoda
- Clade: Pancrustacea
- Class: Insecta
- Order: Diptera
- Family: Syrphidae
- Subfamily: Eristalinae
- Tribe: Milesiini
- Subtribe: Xylotina
- Genus: Xylota
- Species: X. dolini

Binomial name
- Xylota dolini (Kassebeer, 2000)

Synonyms
- Brachypalpoides dolini Kassebeer, 2000

Species of fly

Xylota dolini is a species of hoverfly in the family Syrphidae. The species is found in Azerbaijan.
