= Xylota annulifera =

Scientific classification
- Kingdom: Animalia
- Phylum: Arthropoda
- Clade: Pancrustacea
- Class: Insecta
- Order: Diptera
- Family: Syrphidae
- Subfamily: Eristalinae
- Tribe: Milesiini
- Subtribe: Xylotina
- Genus: Xylota
- Species: X. annulifera

Binomial name
- Xylota annulifera Bigot, 1884

Species of fly

Xylota annulifera , (Bigot, 1884), the Longspine Leafwalker , is an uncommon species of syrphid fly observed across Canada and in the eastern United States. Syrphid flies are also known as Hover Flies or Flower Flies because the adults are frequently found hovering around flowers from which they feed on nectar and pollen. Adults are 7.5–11.8 mm (0.30–0.46 in) long, black with yellow abdominal spots. The larvae of this genus live under bark in sap runs.

== Distribution ==
Xylota annulifera is found throughout Canada and the United States.
