= Xylota tenulonga =

Scientific classification
- Kingdom: Animalia
- Phylum: Arthropoda
- Clade: Pancrustacea
- Class: Insecta
- Order: Diptera
- Family: Syrphidae
- Subfamily: Eristalinae
- Tribe: Milesiini
- Subtribe: Xylotina
- Genus: Xylota
- Species: X. tenulonga

Binomial name
- Xylota tenulonga Yang & Cheng, 1998

Species of fly

Xylota tenulonga is a species of hoverfly in the family Syrphidae.

== Distribution ==
Xylota tenulonga is found within China.
