= Xylota bicincta =

Scientific classification
- Kingdom: Animalia
- Phylum: Arthropoda
- Clade: Pancrustacea
- Class: Insecta
- Order: Diptera
- Family: Syrphidae
- Subfamily: Eristalinae
- Tribe: Milesiini
- Subtribe: Xylotina
- Genus: Xylota
- Species: X. bicincta

Binomial name
- Xylota bicincta (Szilády, 1940)

Synonyms
- Zelima bicincta Szilády, 1940

Species of fly

Xylota bicincta is a species of hoverfly in the family Syrphidae.

== Distribution ==
Unknown.
