= Xylota brachypalpoides =

Scientific classification
- Kingdom: Animalia
- Phylum: Arthropoda
- Clade: Pancrustacea
- Class: Insecta
- Order: Diptera
- Family: Syrphidae
- Subfamily: Eristalinae
- Tribe: Milesiini
- Subtribe: Xylotina
- Genus: Xylota
- Species: X. brachypalpoides

Binomial name
- Xylota brachypalpoides (Shiraki, 1930)

Synonyms
- Zelima brachypalpoides Shiraki, 1930

Species of fly

Xylota brachypalpoides is a species of hoverfly in the family Syrphidae.

== Distribution ==
Xylota brachypalpoides is found throughout Taiwan.
