= Xylota setosa =

Scientific classification
- Kingdom: Animalia
- Phylum: Arthropoda
- Clade: Pancrustacea
- Class: Insecta
- Order: Diptera
- Family: Syrphidae
- Subfamily: Eristalinae
- Tribe: Milesiini
- Subtribe: Xylotina
- Genus: Xylota
- Species: X. setosa

Binomial name
- Xylota setosa (Keiser, 1971)

Synonyms
- Hovaxylota setosa Keiser, 1971

Species of fly

Xylota setosa is a species of hoverfly in the family Syrphidae.

== Distribution ==
Xylota setosa is found distributed across Madagascar.
