= Xylota protrudens =

Scientific classification
- Kingdom: Animalia
- Phylum: Arthropoda
- Clade: Pancrustacea
- Class: Insecta
- Order: Diptera
- Family: Syrphidae
- Subfamily: Eristalinae
- Tribe: Milesiini
- Subtribe: Xylotina
- Genus: Xylota
- Species: X. protrudens

Binomial name
- Xylota protrudens (Hippa, 1985)

Synonyms
- Brachypalpoides protrudens Hippa, 1985

Species of fly

Xylota protrudens is a species of hoverfly in the family Syrphidae.

== Distribution ==
Xylota protrudens is found within Myanmar.
