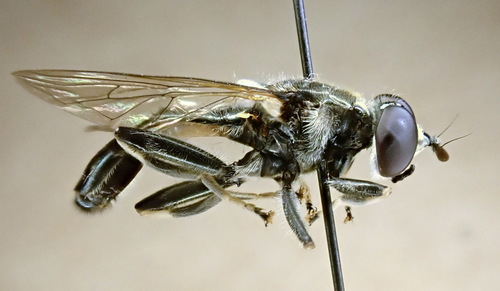
- Xylota angustiventris

Scientific classification
- Kingdom: Animalia
- Phylum: Arthropoda
- Clade: Pancrustacea
- Class: Insecta
- Order: Diptera
- Family: Syrphidae
- Subfamily: Eristalinae
- Tribe: Milesiini
- Subtribe: Xylotina
- Genus: Xylota
- Species: X. angustiventris

Binomial name
- Xylota angustiventris Loew, 1866

Synonyms
- Xylota elongata Williston, 1887

= Xylota angustiventris =

Species of fly

Xylota angustiventris, (Loew, 1866), the Two-spotted Leafwalker , is an uncommon species of syrphid fly observed in northeast North America. Syrphid flies are also known as Hover Flies or Flower Flies because the adults are frequently found hovering around flowers from which they feed on nectar and pollen. Adults are 12.2–14.4 mm (0.48–0.57 in) long, largely black with two yellow spots on the abdomen in the male? The larvae are not known, but in this genus, are likely to be found in tree holes or bark to feed on sap.

== Distribution ==
Xylota angustiventris is found throughout Canada and the United States.
