= Xylota subfasciata =

Scientific classification
- Kingdom: Animalia
- Phylum: Arthropoda
- Clade: Pancrustacea
- Class: Insecta
- Order: Diptera
- Family: Syrphidae
- Subfamily: Eristalinae
- Tribe: Milesiini
- Subtribe: Xylotina
- Genus: Xylota
- Species: X. subfasciata

Binomial name
- Xylota subfasciata Loew, 1866

Synonyms
- Xylota notha Williston, 1887

Species of fly

Xylota subfasciata, commonly known as the large-spotted forest fly, is an uncommon species of syrphid fly observed widely across North America. Syrphid flies are also known as hover flies or flower flies because the adults are frequently found hovering around flowers from which they feed on nectar and pollen. Adults are 8.7–1,312.5 mm (0.34–51.67 in) long, black with large yellow abdominal spots. The larvae of this genus live under bark in sap runs.

== Distribution ==
Xylota subfasciata is found within Canada and the United States. GBIF species page with map
