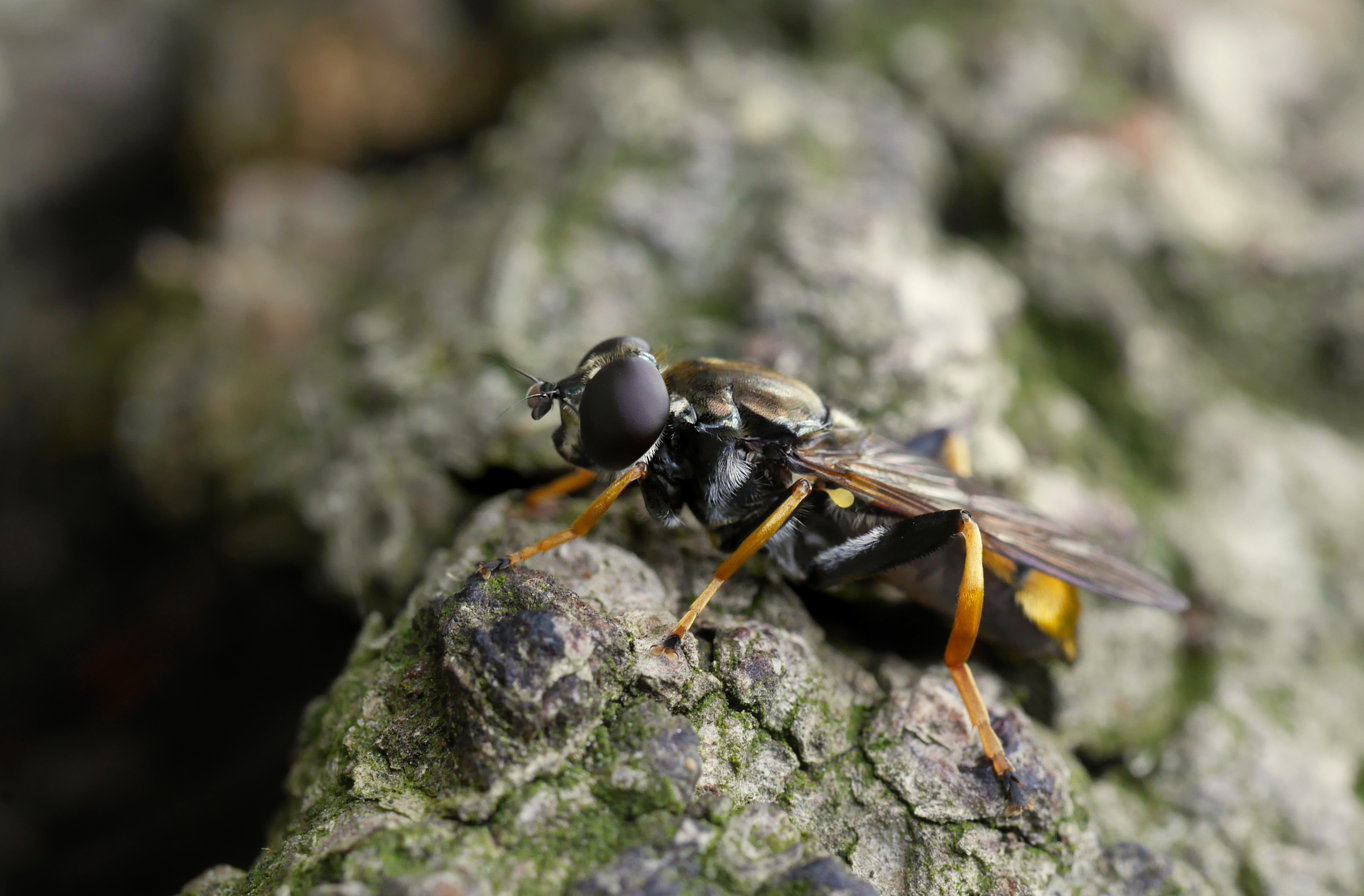

Scientific classification
- Kingdom: Animalia
- Phylum: Arthropoda
- Clade: Pancrustacea
- Class: Insecta
- Order: Diptera
- Family: Syrphidae
- Subfamily: Eristalinae
- Tribe: Milesiini
- Subtribe: Xylotina
- Genus: Xylota
- Species: X. xanthocnema

Binomial name
- Xylota xanthocnema Collin, 1939

= Xylota xanthocnema =

Species of fly

Xylota xanthocnema is a species of hoverfly in the family Syrphidae.

== Distribution ==
Xylota xanthocnema is found distributed across England. Rare in Finland https://laji.fi/observation/map?target=MX.278285&countryId=ML.206 In total, the species has been recorded at just over 20 Nordic sites since 1950. It occurs rarely across virtually the rest of Europe, with the exception of Ireland, Portugal, and Bulgaria. Its global distribution also extends to the southern mountainous regions of the Caucasus.https://artfakta.se/taxa/102556/information
