= Xylota neavei =

Scientific classification
- Kingdom: Animalia
- Phylum: Arthropoda
- Clade: Pancrustacea
- Class: Insecta
- Order: Diptera
- Family: Syrphidae
- Subfamily: Eristalinae
- Tribe: Milesiini
- Subtribe: Xylotina
- Genus: Xylota
- Species: X. neavei

Binomial name
- Xylota neavei (Hippa, 1978)

Synonyms
- Hovaxylota neavei Hippa, 1978

Species of fly

Xylota neavei is a species of hoverfly in the family Syrphidae.

== Distribution ==
Xylota neavei is found across the landlocked African nation of Malawi.
