= Xylota flavipes =

Scientific classification
- Kingdom: Animalia
- Phylum: Arthropoda
- Clade: Pancrustacea
- Class: Insecta
- Order: Diptera
- Family: Syrphidae
- Subfamily: Eristalinae
- Tribe: Milesiini
- Subtribe: Xylotina
- Genus: Xylota
- Species: X. flavipes

Binomial name
- Xylota flavipes (Sack, 1927)

Synonyms
- Zelima flavipes Sack, 1927

Species of fly

Xylota flavipes is a species of hoverfly in the family Syrphidae.

== Distribution ==
Xylota flavipes is found throughout Taiwan.
