= Xylota mimica =

Scientific classification
- Kingdom: Animalia
- Phylum: Arthropoda
- Clade: Pancrustacea
- Class: Insecta
- Order: Diptera
- Family: Syrphidae
- Subfamily: Eristalinae
- Tribe: Milesiini
- Subtribe: Xylotina
- Genus: Xylota
- Species: X. mimica

Binomial name
- Xylota mimica (Hull, 1941)

Synonyms
- Planes mimica Hull, 1941

Species of fly

Xylota mimica is a species of hoverfly in the family Syrphidae.

== Distribution ==
Xylota mimica is found across Madagascar.
