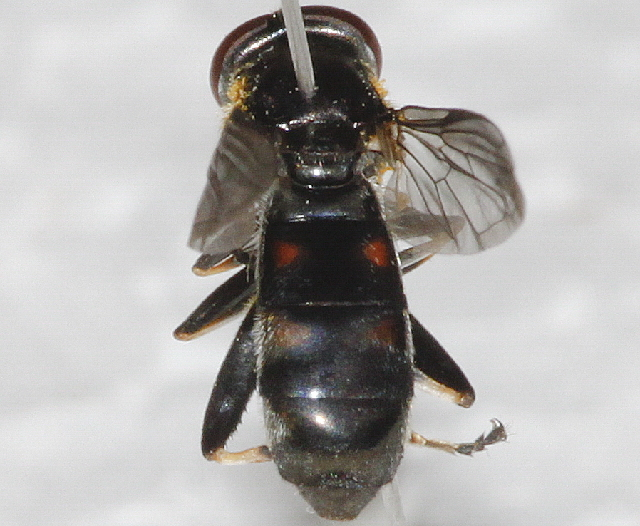

Scientific classification
- Kingdom: Animalia
- Phylum: Arthropoda
- Clade: Pancrustacea
- Class: Insecta
- Order: Diptera
- Family: Syrphidae
- Subfamily: Eristalinae
- Tribe: Milesiini
- Subtribe: Xylotina
- Genus: Xylota
- Species: X. hinei

Binomial name
- Xylota hinei (Curran, 1941)

Synonyms
- Heliophilus hinei Curran, 1941

= Xylota hinei =

Species of fly

Xylota hinei, also known as Hine's leafwalker, is an uncommon species of syrphid fly observed in eastern Canada. Syrphid flies are also known as hover flies or flower flies because the adults are frequently found hovering around flowers from which they feed on nectar and pollen. Adults are 7.8–12.9 mm (0.31–0.51 in) long, black with yellow spots. The larvae of this genus live under bark in sap runs.

== Distribution ==
Xylota hinei is found throughout Canada and the United States.
