= Xylota ouelleti =

Scientific classification
- Kingdom: Animalia
- Phylum: Arthropoda
- Clade: Pancrustacea
- Class: Insecta
- Order: Diptera
- Family: Syrphidae
- Subfamily: Eristalinae
- Tribe: Milesiini
- Subtribe: Xylotina
- Genus: Xylota
- Species: X. ouelleti

Binomial name
- Xylota ouelleti (Curran, 1941)

Synonyms
- Heliophilus ouelleti Curran, 1941

Species of fly

Xylota ouelleti is a species of hoverfly in the family Syrphidae.

== Distribution ==
Xylota ouelleti is found within Canada and the United States.

In Canada, it is found in New Brunswick, Nova Scotia, and Manitoba.

In the United States, its range includes Washington, Michigan, Georgia, Alabama, New York, Pennsylvania, New Jersey, Maryland, and Missouri. GBIF species page
