= Xylota armipes =

Scientific classification
- Kingdom: Animalia
- Phylum: Arthropoda
- Clade: Pancrustacea
- Class: Insecta
- Order: Diptera
- Family: Syrphidae
- Subfamily: Eristalinae
- Tribe: Milesiini
- Subtribe: Xylotina
- Genus: Xylota
- Species: X. armipes

Binomial name
- Xylota armipes (Sack, 1922)

Synonyms
- Zelima armipes Sack, 1922

Species of fly

Xylota armipes is a species of hoverfly in the family Syrphidae.

== Distribution ==
Xylota armipes is found in Taiwan.
