= Xylota cupreiventris =

Scientific classification
- Kingdom: Animalia
- Phylum: Arthropoda
- Clade: Pancrustacea
- Class: Insecta
- Order: Diptera
- Family: Syrphidae
- Subfamily: Eristalinae
- Tribe: Milesiini
- Subtribe: Xylotina
- Genus: Xylota
- Species: X. cupreiventris

Binomial name
- Xylota cupreiventris Brunetti, 1923

Species of fly

Xylota cupreiventris is a species of hoverfly in the family Syrphidae.

== Distribution ==
Xylota cupreiventris is found within India and Laos.
