= Xylota coquilletti =

Scientific classification
- Kingdom: Animalia
- Phylum: Arthropoda
- Clade: Pancrustacea
- Class: Insecta
- Order: Diptera
- Family: Syrphidae
- Subfamily: Eristalinae
- Tribe: Milesiini
- Subtribe: Xylotina
- Genus: Xylota
- Species: X. coquilletti

Binomial name
- Xylota coquilletti Hervé-Bazin, 1914

Synonyms
- Xylota coquilletti var. amamiensis Shiraki, 1968; Xylota cuprina Coquillett, 1898; Xylota huangshanensis He & Chu, 1992; Xylota silvicola Mutin, 1991; Xylota vulgaris Chang & Yang, 1993

Species of fly

Xylota coquilletti is a species of hoverfly in the family Syrphidae.

== Distribution ==
Xylota coquilletti is found throughout Taiwan and Japan.
