= Xylota barbata =

Scientific classification
- Kingdom: Animalia
- Phylum: Arthropoda
- Clade: Pancrustacea
- Class: Insecta
- Order: Diptera
- Family: Syrphidae
- Subfamily: Eristalinae
- Tribe: Milesiini
- Subtribe: Xylotina
- Genus: Xylota
- Species: X. barbata

Binomial name
- Xylota barbata Loew, 1864

Species of fly

Xylota barbata is a species of hoverfly in the family Syrphidae.

== Distribution ==
Xylota barbata is found throughout Canada and the United States.
