= Xylota quadrimaculata =

Scientific classification
- Kingdom: Animalia
- Phylum: Arthropoda
- Clade: Pancrustacea
- Class: Insecta
- Order: Diptera
- Family: Syrphidae
- Subfamily: Eristalinae
- Tribe: Milesiini
- Subtribe: Xylotina
- Genus: Xylota
- Species: X. quadrimaculata

Binomial name
- Xylota quadrimaculata Loew, 1866

Synonyms
- Xylota artemita Hull, 1943

Species of fly

Xylota quadrimaculata , (Loew, 1866), the Four-spotted Leafwalker , is a common species of syrphid fly observed in central and eastern North America. Syrphid flies are also known as Hover Flies or Flower Flies because the adults are frequently found hovering around flowers from which they feed on nectar and pollen. Adults are 8.2–11.3 mm (0.32–0.44 in) long, black with yellow-orange spots on the abdomen. The larvae of this genus live under bark in sap runs.

== Distribution ==
Xylota quadrimaculata is found within Canada and the United States.

Within Canada: Ontario, New Brunswick.

Within United States: New York, Minnesota, Wisconsin, Illinois, New Hampshire, Massachusetts, Pennsylvania, Ohio, Iowa, Maine, Colorado, Mississippi, Tennessee, Maryland, New Jersey, Michigan. GBIF species page
