= Xylota stenogaster =

Scientific classification
- Kingdom: Animalia
- Phylum: Arthropoda
- Clade: Pancrustacea
- Class: Insecta
- Order: Diptera
- Family: Syrphidae
- Subfamily: Eristalinae
- Tribe: Milesiini
- Subtribe: Xylotina
- Genus: Xylota
- Species: X. stenogaster

Binomial name
- Xylota stenogaster Williston, 1892

Species of fly

Xylota stenogaster is a species of hoverfly in the family Syrphidae. It can be found within Mexico.
