= Xylota vulcana =

Scientific classification
- Kingdom: Animalia
- Phylum: Arthropoda
- Clade: Pancrustacea
- Class: Insecta
- Order: Diptera
- Family: Syrphidae
- Subfamily: Eristalinae
- Tribe: Milesiini
- Subtribe: Xylotina
- Genus: Xylota
- Species: X. vulcana

Binomial name
- Xylota vulcana (Hippa, 1978)

Synonyms
- Hovaxylota vulcana Hippa, 1978

Species of fly

Xylota vulcana is a species of hoverfly in the family Syrphidae.

== Distribution ==
Xylota vulcana is found distributed across Kenya.
