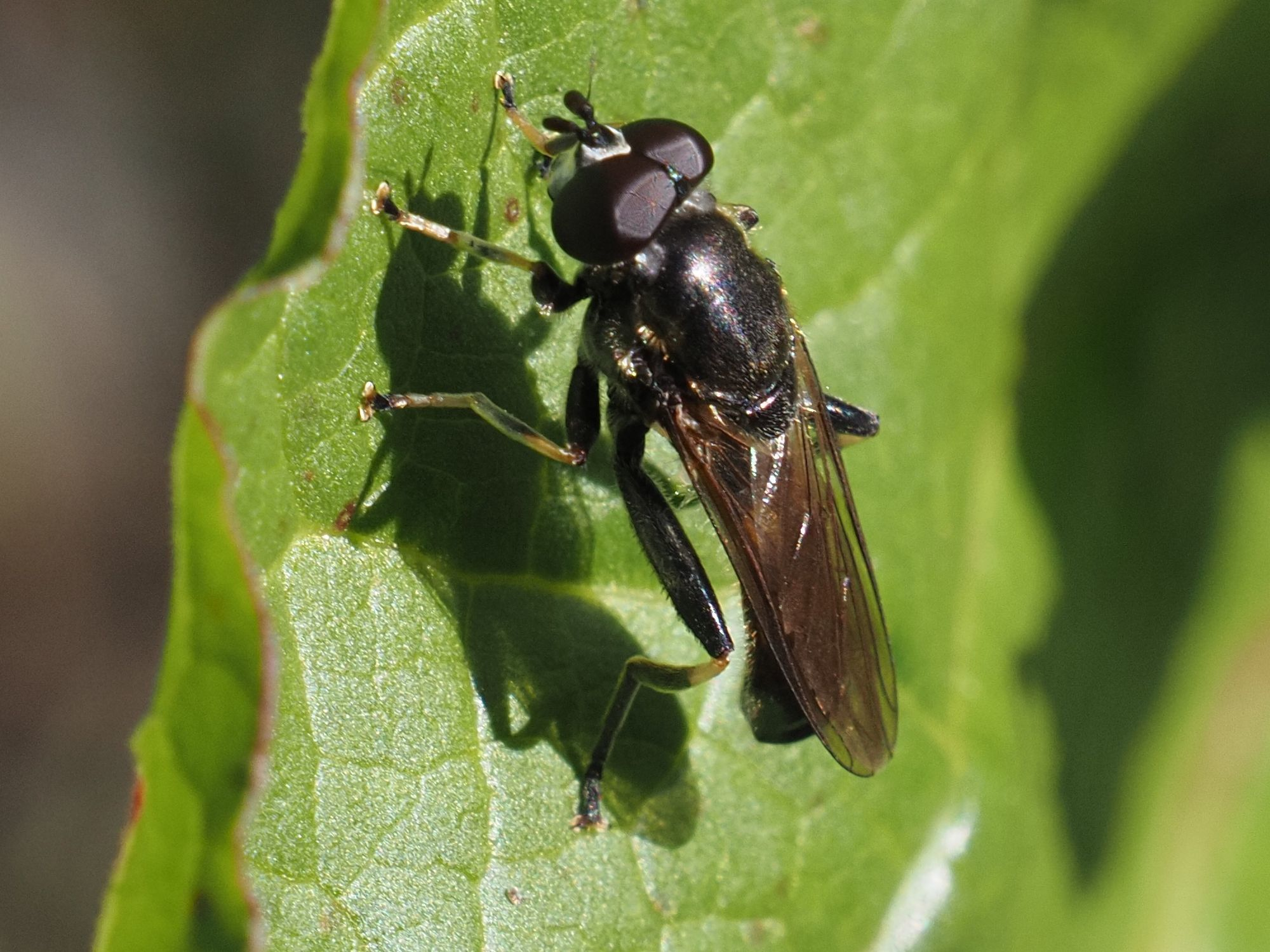

Scientific classification
- Kingdom: Animalia
- Phylum: Arthropoda
- Clade: Pancrustacea
- Class: Insecta
- Order: Diptera
- Family: Syrphidae
- Subfamily: Eristalinae
- Tribe: Milesiini
- Subtribe: Xylotina
- Genus: Xylota
- Species: X. florum

Binomial name
- Xylota florum (Fabricius, 1805)

Synonyms
- Scaeva florum Fabricius, 1805; Xylota corbulo Walker, 1849; Syrphus lugens Rossi, 1790

= Xylota florum =

Genus of flies

Xylota florum is a Palearctic species of hoverfly.

== Description ==
External images For terms see Morphology of Diptera
Wing length 6 ·25-9 ·25 mm. Abdomen black with elongate yellow spots. Hind tibiae pale on basal third. Antero-dorsal hairs on the hind femora including many at least as long as half the depth of the hind femur, these longer hairs present on more than half the femur length. Anterior anepisternum dull, posterior anepisternum shiny. The male genitalia are figured by Hippa (1968). The larva is described by Rotheray (2004).

See references for determination.

== Distribution ==
This species is found across the Palearctic region. Its range extends from Fennoscandia in the north southward to central France. It occurs in Ireland and throughout Europe, continuing east into Russia and the Caucasus, and reaching as far as Siberia.
