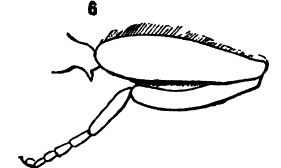
- Xylota flavitibia hind leg male

Scientific classification
- Kingdom: Animalia
- Phylum: Arthropoda
- Clade: Pancrustacea
- Class: Insecta
- Order: Diptera
- Family: Syrphidae
- Subfamily: Eristalinae
- Tribe: Milesiini
- Subtribe: Xylotina
- Genus: Xylota
- Species: X. flavitibia

Binomial name
- Xylota flavitibia Bigot, 1884

= Xylota flavitibia =

Species of fly

Xylota flavitibia is a species of hoverfly in the family Syrphidae.

== Distribution ==
Xylota flavitibia is found throughout Canada and United States.
