= Xylota confusa =

Scientific classification
- Kingdom: Animalia
- Phylum: Arthropoda
- Clade: Pancrustacea
- Class: Insecta
- Order: Diptera
- Family: Syrphidae
- Subfamily: Eristalinae
- Tribe: Milesiini
- Subtribe: Xylotina
- Genus: Xylota
- Species: X. confusa

Binomial name
- Xylota confusa Shannon, 1926

Synonyms
- Heliophilus bigelowi Curran, 1941

Species of fly

Xylota confusa , (Shannon, 1926), the Confusing Leafwalker , is an uncommon species of syrphid fly observed across Northern North America. Syrphid flies are also known as Hover Flies or Flower Flies because the adults are frequently found hovering around flowers from which they feed on nectar and pollen. Adults are 9.3–12.6 mm (0.37–0.50 in) long. The larvae of this genus live under bark in sap runs.

== Distribution ==
Xylota confusa is found throughout Canada and the United States.
