= Xylota taibaishanensis =

Scientific classification
- Kingdom: Animalia
- Phylum: Arthropoda
- Clade: Pancrustacea
- Class: Insecta
- Order: Diptera
- Family: Syrphidae
- Subfamily: Eristalinae
- Tribe: Milesiini
- Subtribe: Xylotina
- Genus: Xylota
- Species: X. taibaishanensis

Binomial name
- Xylota taibaishanensis He & Zhang, 1997

Synonyms
- Xylota taibaishanensia He & Chu, 1997

Species of fly

Xylota taibaishanensis is a species of hoverfly in the family Syrphidae.

== Distribution ==
Xylota taibaishanensis is found within China.
