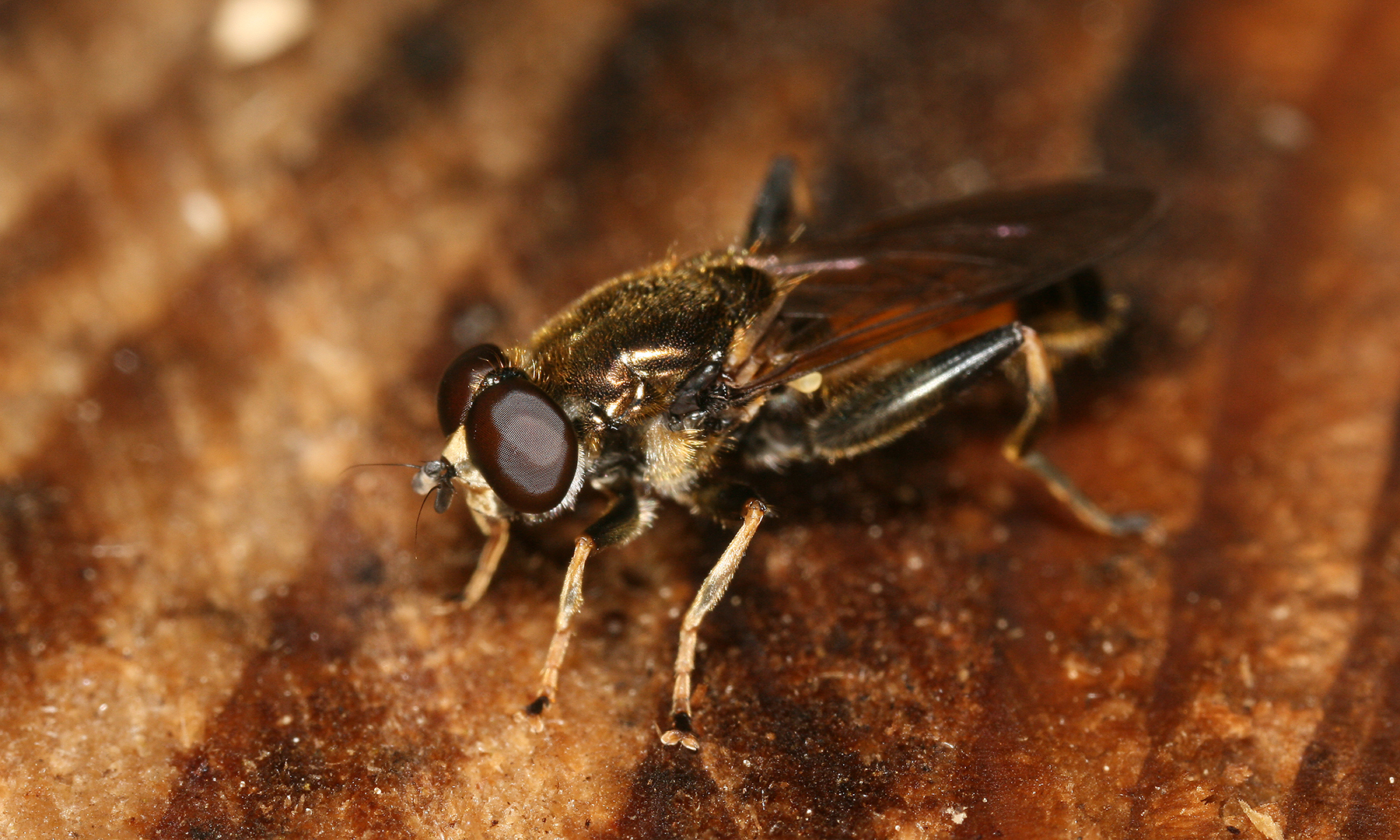
- Xylota segnis
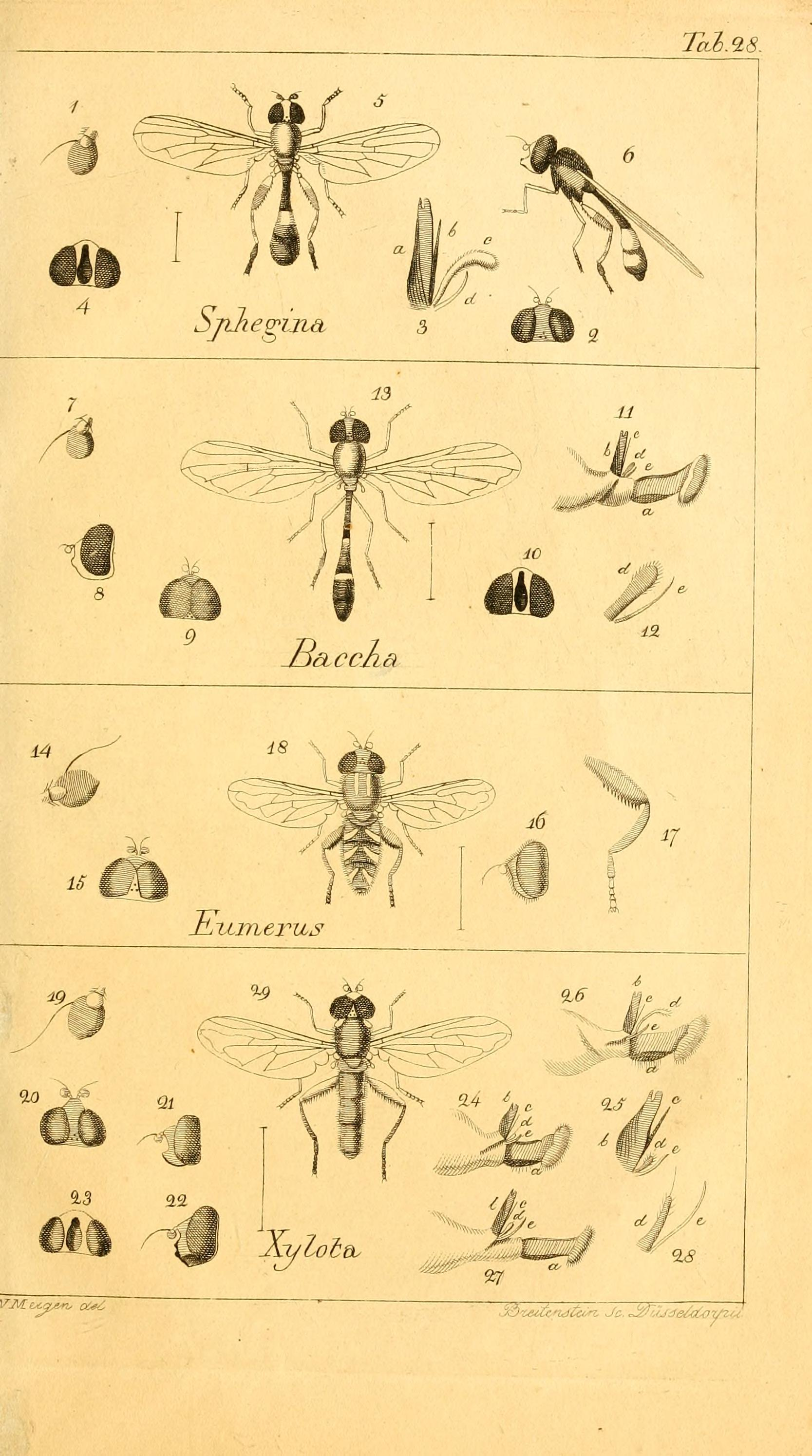
- Xylota in Meigen Systematische Beschreibung der bekannten europäischen zweiflügeligen Insekten Tome 3 1822

Scientific classification
- Kingdom: Animalia
- Phylum: Arthropoda
- Class: Insecta
- Order: Diptera
- Family: Syrphidae
- Subfamily: Eristalinae
- Tribe: Milesiini
- Subtribe: Xylotina
- Genus: Xylota; Meigen, 1822

Type species
- Musca sylvarum Linnaeus, 1758

Synonyms
- Zelima Meigen, 1800; Eumeros Meigen, 1803; Heliophilus Meigen, 1803; Eumerus Meigen, 1804; Heliophylus Fischer, 1813; Eumenos Leach, 1817; Fumerus Eversmann, 1834; Eumenis Gimmerthal, 1834; Micraptoma Westwood, 1840; Pelia Gistel, 1848; Hylota Stahl, 1883; Cheiroxylota Hull, 1949; Hovaxylota Keiser, 1971; Ameroxylota Hippa, 1978; Brachypalpoides Hippa, 1978; Sterphoides Hippa, 1978; Syrittoxylota Hippa, 1978; Dimorphoxylota Hippa, 1978; Haploxylota Mutin & Gilbert, 1999

= Xylota =

Genus of flies

Xylota is a Holarctic genus of hoverflies similar in structure to the related genera Chalcosyrphus and Brachypalpoides. As the larvae are saprophytic they're usually found in rotting wood. The adult flies are generally associated with woodland and woodland edges and can often be seen running over the upper sides of leaves. Unlike other syrphids the adults of many species rarely visit flowers preferring instead to gather pollen from leaf surfaces. There are over 100 described species of which 12 can be found in Europe. Seven species have been recorded in Britain. Identification of species has been difficult and identification by photographs is risky.

== Species ==
- Xylota abiens Meigen, 1822
- Xylota abosa Séguy, 1948
- Xylota aeneimaculata Meijere, 1908
- Xylota amaculata Yang & Cheng, 1998
- Xylota amylostigma Yang & Cheng, 1998
- Xylota analis Williston, 1887
- Xylota angustata Hippa, 1978
- Xylota angustiventris Loew, 1866
- Xylota annulifera Bigot, 1884
- Xylota argoi Shannon, 1926
- Xylota armipes (Sack, 1922)
- Xylota atricoloris Mutin, 1987
- Xylota atroparva Hippa, 1974
- Xylota auronitens Brunetti, 1908
- Xylota azurea (Fluke, 1953)
- Xylota barbata Loew, 1864
- Xylota bicincta (Szilády, 1940)
- Xylota bicolor Loew, 1864
- Xylota bimaculata (Shiraki, 1930)
- Xylota bistriata Brunetti, 1915
- Xylota boninensis Shiraki, 1963
- Xylota brachygaster Williston, 1892
- Xylota brachypalpoides (Shiraki, 1930)
- Xylota brunettii Curran, 1928
- Xylota brunnipes Shiraki, 1968
- Xylota caeruleiventris Zetterstedt, 1838
- Xylota caerulifrons Bigot, 1884
- Xylota carbonaria Brunetti, 1923
- Xylota chalcopyga Hippa, 1978
- Xylota coeruleopicta Hippa, 1978
- Xylota conformis Walker, 1857
- Xylota confusa Shannon, 1926
- Xylota coquilletti Hervé-Bazin, 1914
- Xylota cupreiventris Brunetti, 1923
- Xylota cuprina Bigot, 1885
- Xylota cupripurpura Huo, Zhang & Zheng, 2004
- Xylota danieli Mutin & Ichige, 2014
- Xylota discolor (Hippa, 1985)
- Xylota dolini (Kassebeer, 2000)
- Xylota ejuncida Say, 1824
- Xylota ferratus (Hippa, 1985)
- Xylota filipjevi (Stackelberg, 1952)
- Xylota flavifacies (Shiraki, 1930)
- Xylota flavifrons Walker, 1849
- Xylota flavipes (Sack, 1927)
- Xylota flavitarsis Macquart, 1846
- Xylota flavitibia Bigot, 1884
- Xylota florum (Fabricius, 1805)
- Xylota flukei (Curran, 1941)
- Xylota fo Hull, 1944
- Xylota formosana Matsumura, 1916
- Xylota frontalis (Shiraki & Edashige, 1953)
- Xylota furcata Hippa, 1982
- Xylota hancocki Curran, 1927
- Xylota heinrichi (Hippa, 1986)
- Xylota hinei (Curran, 1941)
- Xylota hisamatsui (Shiraki & Edashige, 1953)
- Xylota honghe Huo, Zhang & Zheng, 2004
- Xylota ignava (Panzer, 1798)
- Xylota impensa He & Zhang, 1997
- Xylota iriana Hippa, 1978
- Xylota isokoae Shiraki, 1968
- Xylota jakutorum Bagatshanova, 1980
- Xylota lapsa (Mutin, 1990)
- Xylota lea Hippa, 1978
- Xylota lenta Meigen, 1822
- Xylota lovetti Curran, 1925
- Xylota maculabstrusa Yang & Cheng, 1998
- Xylota makiana (Shiraki, 1930)
- Xylota meigeniana Stackelberg, 1964
- Xylota micrura (Curran, 1941)
- Xylota mimica (Hull, 1941)
- Xylota morna Curran, 1931
- Xylota naknek Shannon, 1926
- Xylota nartshukae Bagatshanova, 1984
- Xylota neavei (Hippa, 1978)
- Xylota nebulosa Johnson, 1921
- Xylota nigroaenescens Rondani, 1875
- Xylota nitidula (Fluke, 1939)
- Xylota novaeguineae Hippa, 1978
- Xylota nursei Brunetti, 1923
- Xylota ouelleti (Curran, 1941)
- Xylota pectinatus (Hippa, 1985)
- Xylota pendleburyi Curran, 1928
- Xylota penicillata Brunetti, 1923
- Xylota perarmata (Hippa, 1985)
- Xylota pernigra (Hippa, 1985)
- Xylota philippinica Mutin & Gilbert, 1999
- Xylota pilosus (Hippa, 1985)
- Xylota planiformis (Hull, 1941)
- Xylota plumipes (Hippa, 1985)
- Xylota processifera Hippa, 1978
- Xylota protrudens (Hippa, 1985)
- Xylota puella Becker, 1921
- Xylota quadrimaculata Loew, 1866
- Xylota rufiseta Hippa, 1982
- Xylota satyrus (Keiser, 1971)
- Xylota scutellarmata Lovett, 1919
- Xylota segnis (Linnaeus, 1758)
- Xylota semulater (Harris, 1780)
- Xylota setigera Hippa, 1982
- Xylota setosa (Keiser, 1971)
- Xylota sibirica (Loew, 1871)
- Xylota sichotana Mutin, 1985
- Xylota silvicola Mutin, 1987
- Xylota simplex (Shiraki, 1930)
- Xylota spinipes Curran, 1928
- Xylota splendens Shiraki, 1968
- Xylota spurivulgaris Yang & Cheng, 1998
- Xylota stenogaster Williston, 1892
- Xylota steyskali Thompson, 1975
- Xylota stylata Hull, 1944
- Xylota subfasciata Loew, 1866
- Xylota suecica (Ringdahl, 1943)
- Xylota sylvarum (Linnaeus, 1758)
- Xylota taibaishanensis He & Chu, 1997
- Xylota talyshensis Hauser, 1998
- Xylota tarda Meigen, 1822
- Xylota tenulonga Yang & Cheng, 1998
- Xylota triangularis Zetterstedt, 1838
- Xylota tridens (Hippa, 1985)
- Xylota tuberculata (Curran, 1941)
- Xylota uluguruensis (Hippa, 1978)
- Xylota umbrosa Violovitsh, 1975
- Xylota unica Violovich, 1977
- Xylota violaceus (Hippa, 1985)
- Xylota vulcana (Hippa, 1978)
- Xylota willistoni Goot, 1964
- Xylota xanthocnema Collin, 1939
- Xylota zeya Mutin & Gilbert, 1999
