= Xylotina =

Scientific classification
- Domain: Eukaryota
- Kingdom: Animalia
- Phylum: Arthropoda
- Class: Insecta
- Order: Diptera
- Family: Syrphidae
- Subfamily: Eristalinae
- Tribe: Milesiini
- Subtribe: Xylotina

Subtribe of insects

Xylotina is a subtribe of insects. It includes the genera Brachypalpus, Chalcosyrphus, Hadromyia, Pocota, and Xylota.
