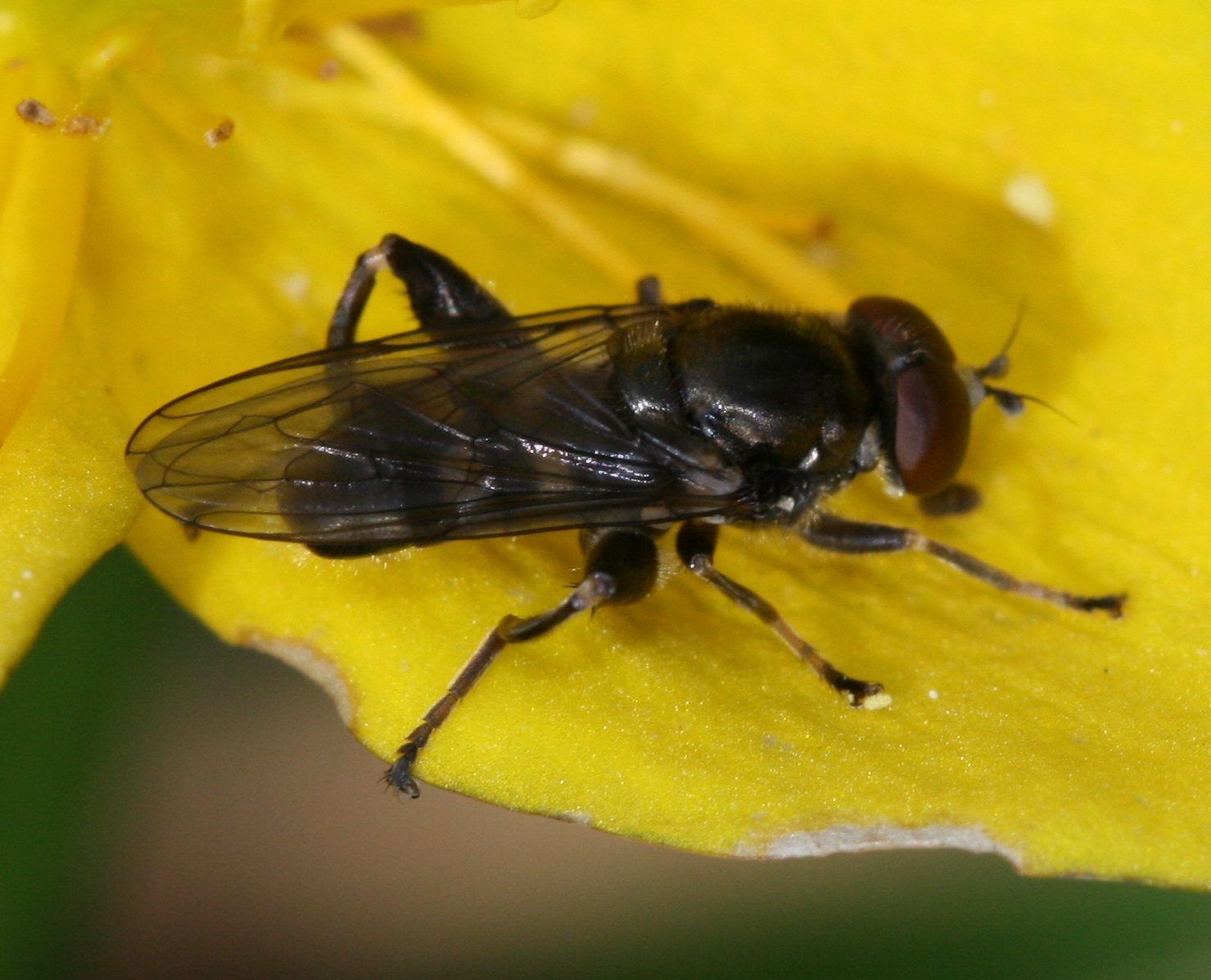

Scientific classification
- Kingdom: Animalia
- Phylum: Arthropoda
- Clade: Pancrustacea
- Class: Insecta
- Order: Diptera
- Family: Syrphidae
- Subfamily: Eristalinae
- Tribe: Milesiini
- Subtribe: Xylotina
- Genus: Chalcosyrphus
- Subgenus: Xylotomima
- Species: C. nemorum

Binomial name
- Chalcosyrphus nemorum (Fabricius, 1805)
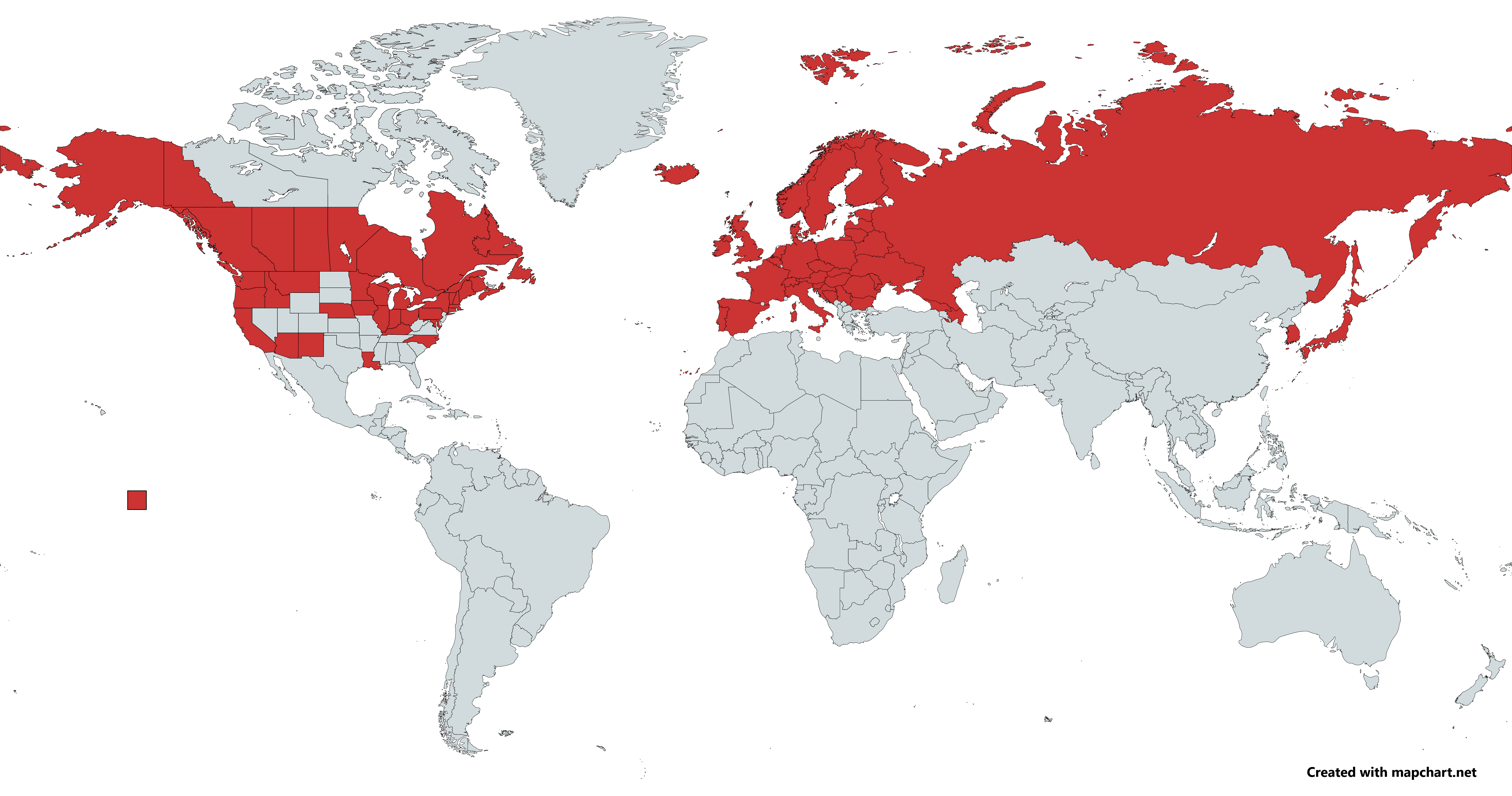

Synonyms
- Chalcosyrphus bifasciatus (Meigen, 1822); Milesia nemorum Fabricius, 1805; Xylota bifasciata Meigen, 1822; Syrphus interruptus Panzer, 1804; Xylotomima americana Shannon, 1926; Xylota arsenjevi Violovich, 1980; Xylota baton Walker, 1849; Xylota fraudulosa Loew, 1864; Xylota roerichi Violovich, 1975

= Chalcosyrphus nemorum =

Species of fly

Chalcosyrphus (Xylotomima) nemorum (Fabricius 1805), the Dusky-banded Leafwalker, is a common species of syrphid fly with a Palearctic and Nearctic distribution. Hoverflies get their names from the ability to remain nearly motionless while in flight. The adults are also known as flower flies for they are commonly found around and on flowers, from which they get both energy-giving nectar and protein-rich pollen. Larvae have been found under the bark of Larix, Pinus and a variety of hardwoods.

== Description ==
External images For terms see Morphology of Diptera
Wing length 6.5-8.25 mm. Hind femora are swollen and deep. Hind tibiae strongly curved and the ventral surface with closely-set short black hairs for the whole length. The abdomen is short tergites 2-4 with a pair of pink or orange-brown marks. The legs are black with yellow knees and yellow tarsi. The larva is figured by Hartley (1961).

== Distribution ==
Fennoscandia South to the Pyrenees and from Ireland East through Northern, Central and Southern Europe (to South Italy) across the Palearctic into Russia and the Russian Far East and Sakhalin and Japan. In the Nearctic from Alaska to Nova Scotia and South to California. (see distribution map)

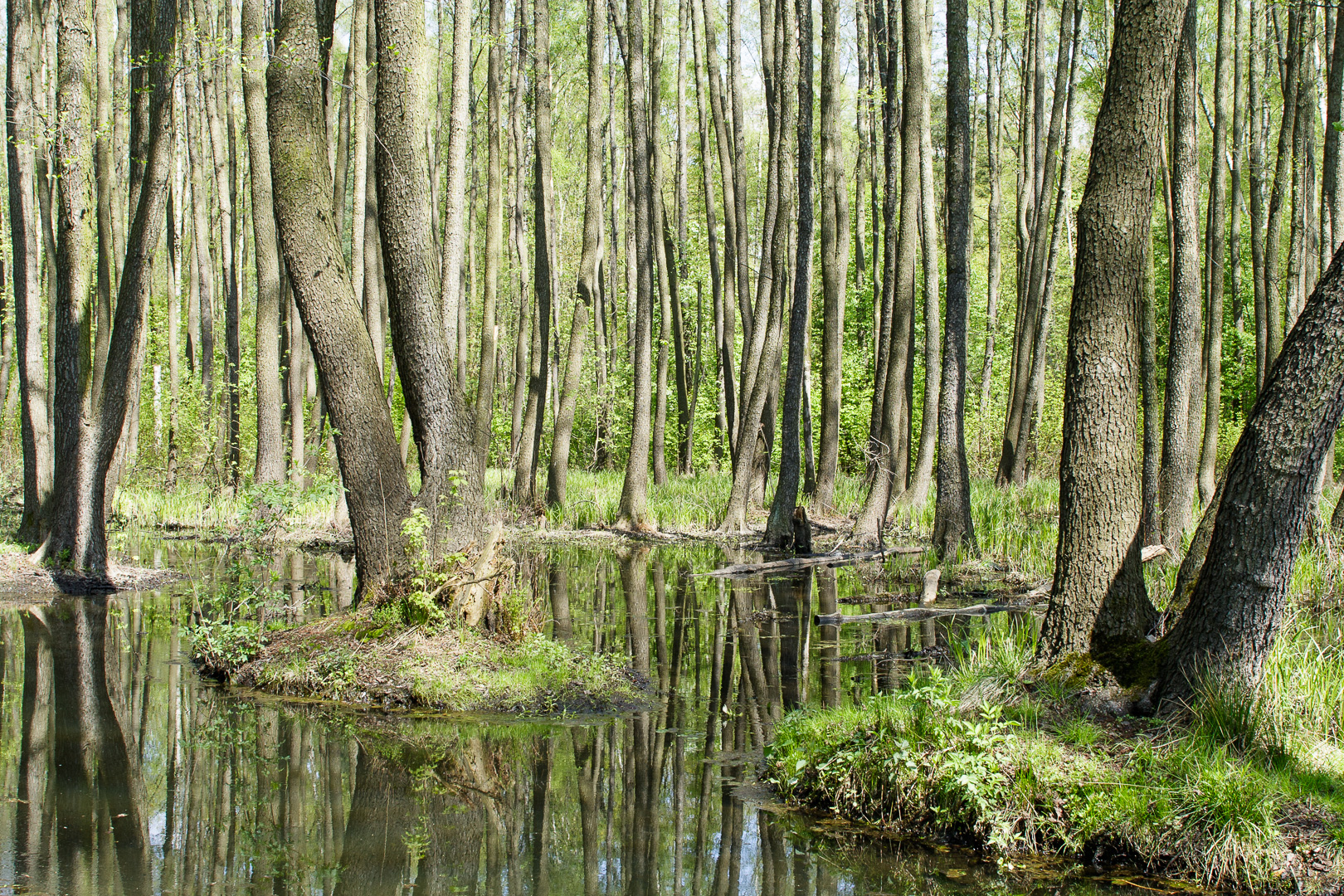
Habitat.Poland

== Biology ==
The habitat is forest wetland (Alnus - Salix carr, deciduous forest and woodland with streams). Adults frequent sunlit foliage of bushes on trunks of fallen trees beside water and settle on damp mud at the water's edge. Flowers visited include white umbellifers, Caltha, Anemone nemorosa, Euphorbia amygdaloides, Ranunculus, Rubus idaeus, Potentilla erecta, Sorbus aucupariaand Taraxacum. Flies from the beginning of May to the end of September.
