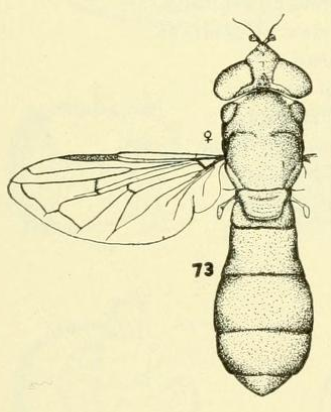
- female

Scientific classification
- Kingdom: Animalia
- Phylum: Arthropoda
- Clade: Pancrustacea
- Class: Insecta
- Order: Diptera
- Family: Syrphidae
- Subtribe: Xylotina
- Genus: Chalcosyrphus
- Subgenus: Chalcosyrphus
- Species: C. depressus

Binomial name
- Chalcosyrphus depressus (Shannon, 1925)

Synonyms
- Chalcomyia depressa Shannon, 1925; Chalcomyia atra Curran, 1925; Heliophilus carri Curran, 1941

= Chalcosyrphus depressus =

Species of fly

Chalcosyrphus depressus (Shannon, 1925) the wide-eyed leafwalker, is a rare species of syrphid fly observed from Idaho and Montana. Hoverflies can remain nearly motionless in flight. The adults are also known as flower flies for they are commonly found on flowers, from which they get both energy-giving nectar and protein-rich pollen.

== Distribution ==
United States
