= Valgus =

Valgus may refer to:

- Valgus deformity, an orthopedic deformity
  - Cubitus valgus, affecting the forearm
- Valgus stress, a test for the knee
- Valgus (publisher), Estonian publisher
- Valgus (newspaper), Estonian newspaper
- Valgus (beetle), a genus of beetles
- Chalcosyrphus valgus, a species of hoverfly in the family Syrphidae

== See also ==
- Valgu (disambiguation)
