= Chalcosyrphus sacawajeae =

Scientific classification
- Kingdom: Animalia
- Phylum: Arthropoda
- Clade: Pancrustacea
- Class: Insecta
- Order: Diptera
- Family: Syrphidae
- Subfamily: Eristalinae
- Tribe: Milesiini
- Subtribe: Xylotina
- Genus: Chalcosyrphus
- Subgenus: Xylotomima
- Species: C. sacawajeae

Binomial name
- Chalcosyrphus sacawajeae (Shannon, 1926)

Synonyms
- Xylotodes sacawajeae Shannon, 1926; Xylotodes sacajawaeae Shannon, 1926; Xylotodes sacawajeae Shannon, 1926

Species of fly

Chalcosyrphus (Xylotomima) sacawajeae (Shannon, 1926), the Hairy-winged Leafwalker, is a rare species of syrphid fly observed in the Northern United States and Western Canada. Hoverflies can remain nearly motionless while in flight. The adults are also known as flower flies for they are commonly found on flowers, from which they get both energy-giving nectar and protein-rich pollen.

== Distribution ==
United States.
