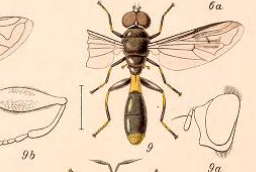
- Wulp, F. M. van der 1892

Scientific classification
- Kingdom: Animalia
- Phylum: Arthropoda
- Clade: Pancrustacea
- Class: Insecta
- Order: Diptera
- Family: Syrphidae
- Subfamily: Eristalinae
- Tribe: Milesiini
- Subtribe: Xylotina
- Genus: Chalcosyrphus
- Subgenus: Neplas
- Species: C. pauxilla

Binomial name
- Chalcosyrphus pauxilla (Williston, 1892)

Synonyms
- Xylota pauxilla Williston, 1892; Planes willistoni Shannon, 1926; Brachypalpus trifasciata Hull, 1944

= Chalcosyrphus pauxilla =

Species of fly

Chalcosyrphus (Neplas) pauxilla (Williston 1892), the Yellow-waisted Leafwalker, is a very rare species of syrphid fly collected in California and Mexico. Hoverflies get their names from the ability to remain nearly motionless while in flight. The adults are also known as flower flies for they are commonly found around and on flowers, from which they get both energy-giving nectar and protein-rich pollen.

== Distribution ==
United States.
