= Chalcosyrphus anomalus =

Scientific classification
- Kingdom: Animalia
- Phylum: Arthropoda
- Clade: Pancrustacea
- Class: Insecta
- Order: Diptera
- Family: Syrphidae
- Subfamily: Eristalinae
- Tribe: Milesiini
- Subtribe: Xylotina
- Genus: Chalcosyrphus
- Subgenus: Xylotomima
- Species: C. anomalus

Binomial name
- Chalcosyrphus anomalus (Shannon, 1925)

Synonyms
- Chalcomyia anomala Shannon, 1925

Species of fly

Chalcosyrphus (Xylotomima) anomalus , the long-tailed leafwalker, is a rare species of syrphid fly found in Eastern Canada and the Northeastern United States. Hoverflies can remain nearly motionless while in flight. The adults are also known as flower flies for they are commonly found around and on flowers, from which they get both energy-giving nectar and protein-rich pollen.

== Distribution ==
Canada, United States.
