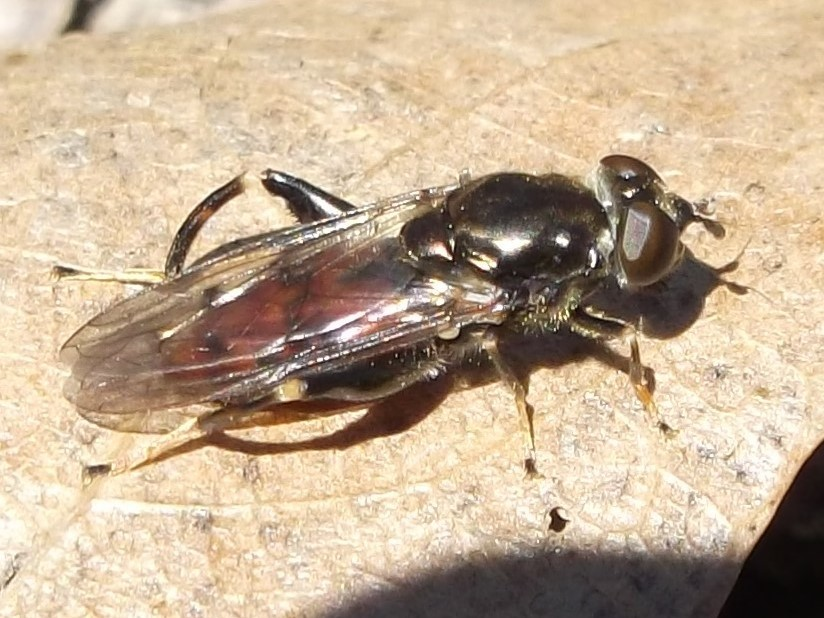
- Chalcosyrphus libo in Ottawa, Canada

Scientific classification
- Kingdom: Animalia
- Phylum: Arthropoda
- Clade: Pancrustacea
- Class: Insecta
- Order: Diptera
- Family: Syrphidae
- Subfamily: Eristalinae
- Tribe: Milesiini
- Subtribe: Xylotina
- Genus: Chalcosyrphus
- Subgenus: Xylotomima
- Species: C. libo

Binomial name
- Chalcosyrphus libo (Walker, 1849)

Synonyms
- Xylota libo Walker, 1849; Xylota marginalis (Williston, 1887)

= Chalcosyrphus libo =

Species of fly

Chalcosyrphus (Xylotomima) libo (Walker, 1849 ), the Long-haired Leafwalker, is an uncommon species of syrphid fly observed in north-central North America. Hoverflies are able to remain nearly motionless in flight. The adults are also known as flower flies for they are commonly found around and on flowers, from which they get both energy-giving nectar and protein-rich pollen.

== Distribution ==
Canada, United States.
