= Chalcosyrphus fulviventris =

Scientific classification
- Kingdom: Animalia
- Phylum: Arthropoda
- Clade: Pancrustacea
- Class: Insecta
- Order: Diptera
- Family: Syrphidae
- Subfamily: Eristalinae
- Tribe: Milesiini
- Subtribe: Xylotina
- Genus: Chalcosyrphus
- Subgenus: Xylotomima
- Species: C. fulviventris

Binomial name
- Chalcosyrphus fulviventris (Bigot, 1861)

Synonyms
- Xylota fulviventris Bigot, 1861; Xylota nigerrima Becker, 1910

Species of fly

Chalcosyrphus fulviventris is a species of hoverfly in the family Syrphidae.

== Distribution ==
France.
