= Chalcosyrphus anthreas =

Scientific classification
- Kingdom: Animalia
- Phylum: Arthropoda
- Clade: Pancrustacea
- Class: Insecta
- Order: Diptera
- Family: Syrphidae
- Subfamily: Eristalinae
- Tribe: Milesiini
- Subtribe: Xylotina
- Genus: Chalcosyrphus
- Subgenus: Xylotomima
- Species: C. anthreas

Binomial name
- Chalcosyrphus anthreas (Walker, 1849)

Synonyms
- Xylota anthreas Walker, 1849; Chalcomyia facialis (Coquillett, 1910); Xylota facialis Coquillett, 1910

Species of fly

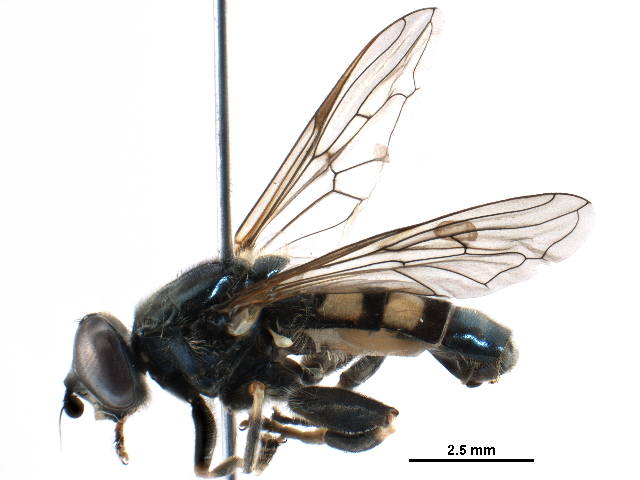

Chalcosyrphus (Xylotomima) anthreas, the yellow-banded leafwalker, is a rare species of syrphid fly found in eastern North America. Hoverflies can remain nearly motionless in flight. The adults are also known as flower flies for they are commonly found on flowers, from which they get both energy-giving nectar and protein-rich pollen.

== Distribution ==
Canada, United States
