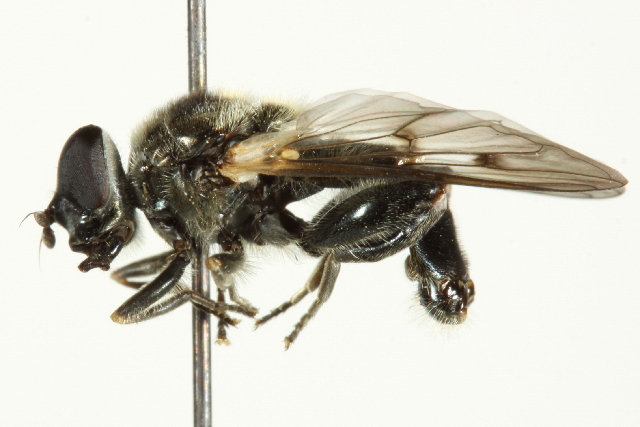
- C.ontario

Scientific classification
- Kingdom: Animalia
- Phylum: Arthropoda
- Clade: Pancrustacea
- Class: Insecta
- Order: Diptera
- Family: Syrphidae
- Subfamily: Eristalinae
- Tribe: Milesiini
- Subtribe: Xylotina
- Genus: Chalcosyrphus
- Subgenus: Xylotomima
- Species: C. ontario

Binomial name
- Chalcosyrphus ontario (Curran, 1941)

Synonyms
- Heliophilus ontario Curran, 1941

= Chalcosyrphus ontario =

Species of fly

Chalcosyrphus (Xylotomima) ontario (Curran, 1941), the bare-winged leafwalker, is a rare species of syrphid fly found in Southeastern and Western Canada and in California. Hoverflies can remain nearly motionless in flight. The adult of the species are also known as flower flies, as they are commonly found around and on flowers, from which they get both energy-giving nectar and protein-rich pollen.

== Distribution ==
Canada, United States.
