= Chalcosyrphus satanica =

Scientific classification
- Kingdom: Animalia
- Phylum: Arthropoda
- Clade: Pancrustacea
- Class: Insecta
- Order: Diptera
- Family: Syrphidae
- Tribe: Milesiini
- Subtribe: Xylotina
- Genus: Chalcosyrphus
- Species: C. satanica

Binomial name
- Chalcosyrphus satanica (Bigot, 1884)

Species of fly

Chalcosyrphus (Xylotomima) satanica, the devil's leafwalker, is a rare species of syrphid fly collected in California. Hoverflies can appear nearly motionless while in flight. The adults, also known as flower flies for they are commonly found around and on flowers from which they get both energy-giving nectar and protein rich pollen.

== Distribution ==
United States.
