= Chalcosyrphus chalybeus =

- Chalcosyrphus chalybeus female

Scientific classification
- Kingdom: Animalia
- Phylum: Arthropoda
- Clade: Pancrustacea
- Class: Insecta
- Order: Diptera
- Family: Syrphidae
- Subfamily: Eristalinae
- Tribe: Milesiini
- Subtribe: Xylotina
- Genus: Chalcosyrphus
- Subgenus: Xylotomima
- Species: C. chalybeus

Binomial name
- Chalcosyrphus chalybeus (Wiedemann, 1830)

Synonyms
- Xylota chalybea Wiedemann, 1830; Xylota purpurea Walker, 1849; Syrphus violascens Megerle, 1803

Species of fly

Chalcosyrphus (Xylotomima) chalybeus (Weidemann, 1830), the violet leafwalker, is a fairly common species of syrphid fly observed in the Northeastern United States. Hoverflies can remain nearly motionless in flight. The adults are also known as flower flies for they are commonly found on flowers, from which they get both energy-giving nectar and protein-rich pollen.

== Distribution ==
Canada, United States.
