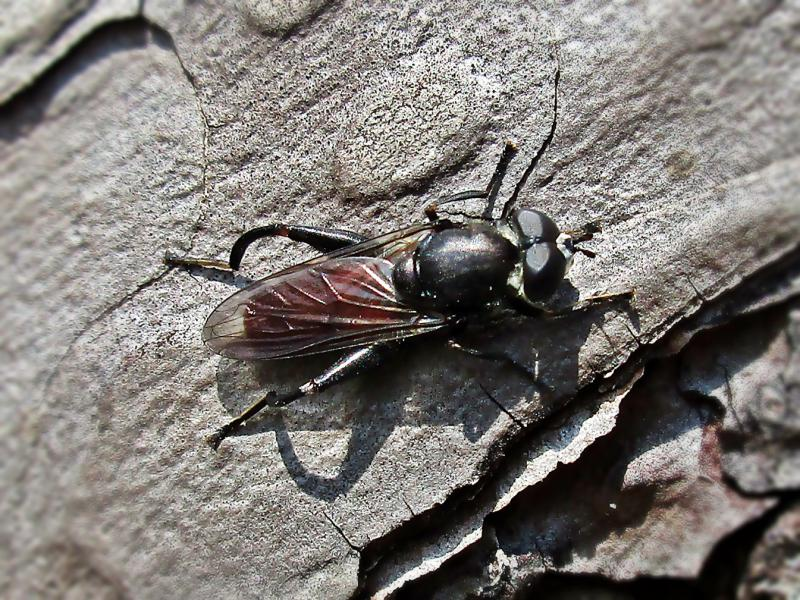
- Male

Scientific classification
- Kingdom: Animalia
- Phylum: Arthropoda
- Clade: Pancrustacea
- Class: Insecta
- Order: Diptera
- Family: Syrphidae
- Subfamily: Eristalinae
- Tribe: Milesiini
- Subtribe: Xylotina
- Genus: Chalcosyrphus
- Subgenus: Xylotomima
- Species: C. piger

Binomial name
- Chalcosyrphus piger (Fabricius, 1794)
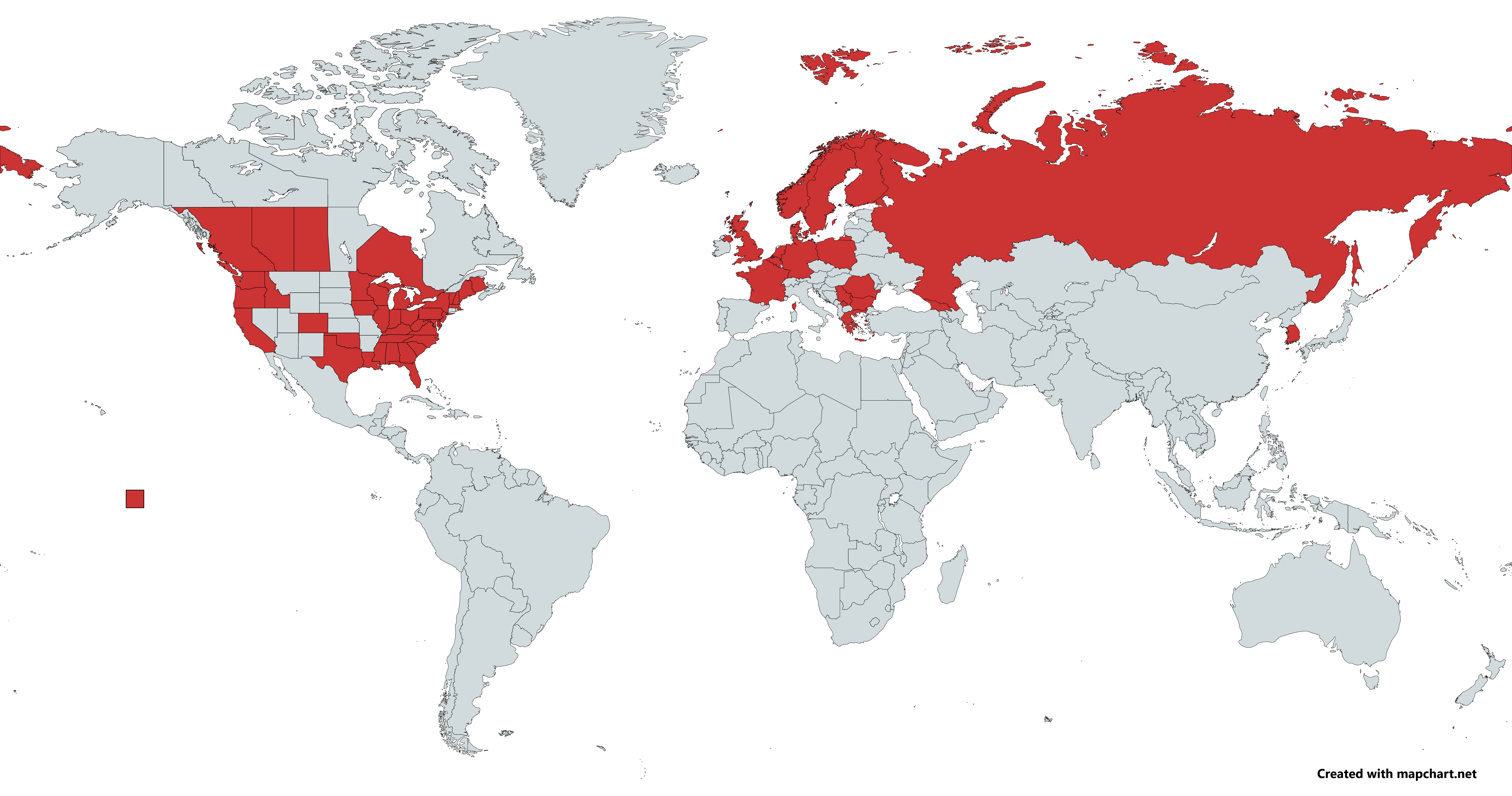

Synonyms
- Milesia haematodes Fabricius, 1805; Syrphus piger Fabricius, 1794; Xylota crassipes Wahlberg, 1839; Xylota nigra Walker, 1849; Xylota pini Perris, 1870; Xylota rubbiginigaster Bigot, 1884

= Chalcosyrphus piger =

Species of fly

Chalcosyrphus (Xylotomima) piger (Fabricius, 1794), the short-haired leafwalker, is an uncommon species of syrphid fly found throughout North America and Europe. Hoverflies get their names from the ability to remain nearly motionless while in flight. The adults are also known as flower flies, for they are commonly found around and on flowers, from which they get both energy-giving nectar and protein-rich pollen. Larvae have been identified from sappy hollows from Larix and Pinus.

== Distribution ==
Europe, Canada, United States.(see distribution map)
