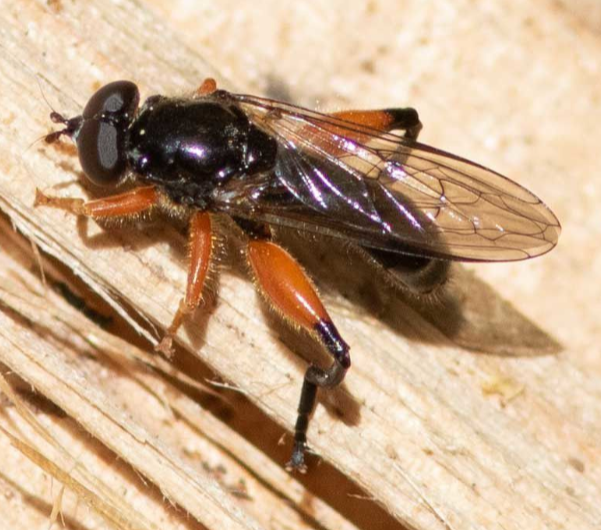

Scientific classification
- Kingdom: Animalia
- Phylum: Arthropoda
- Clade: Pancrustacea
- Class: Insecta
- Order: Diptera
- Family: Syrphidae
- Subfamily: Eristalinae
- Tribe: Milesiini
- Subtribe: Xylotina
- Genus: Chalcosyrphus
- Subgenus: Xylotomima
- Species: C. plesia

Binomial name
- Chalcosyrphus plesia (Curran, 1925)

Synonyms
- Xylota plesia Curran, 1925

= Chalcosyrphus plesia =

Species of fly

Chalcosyrphus (Xylotomima) plesia (Curran 1925), the black-hipped leafwalker, is an uncommon species of syrphid fly and a mimic of Sphex nudus. This fly is found in the northeastern United States and southeastern Canada. Hoverflies can remain nearly motionless while in flight. The adults are also known as flower flies for they are commonly found around and on flowers, from which they get both energy-giving nectar and protein-rich pollen.

== Distribution ==
Canada, United States.
