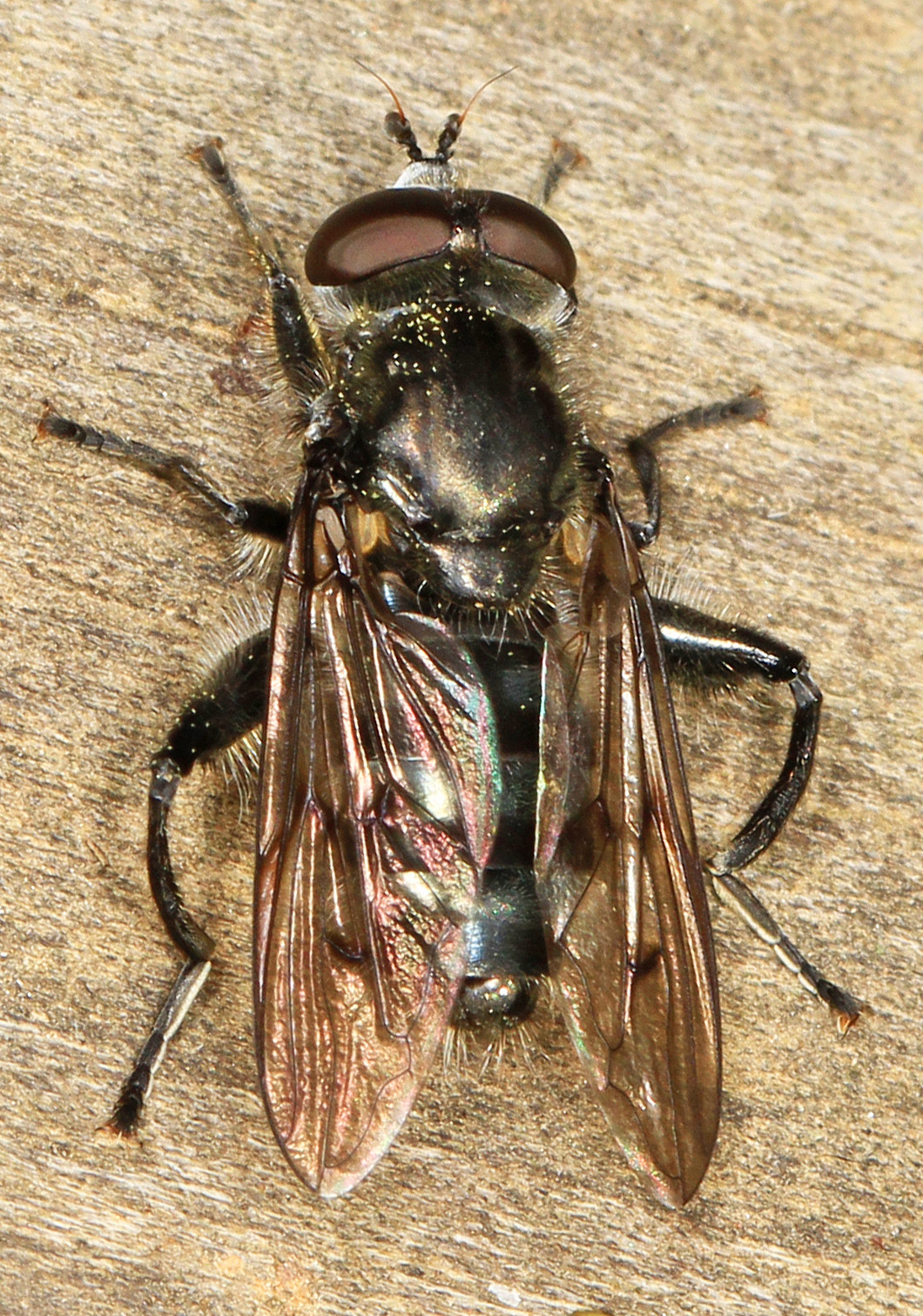

Scientific classification
- Kingdom: Animalia
- Phylum: Arthropoda
- Clade: Pancrustacea
- Class: Insecta
- Order: Diptera
- Family: Syrphidae
- Subfamily: Eristalinae
- Tribe: Milesiini
- Subtribe: Xylotina
- Genus: Chalcosyrphus
- Subgenus: Xylotomima
- Species: C. metallifer

Binomial name
- Chalcosyrphus metallifer (Bigot, 1884)

Synonyms
- Xylota metallifera Bigot, 1884; Xylota rileyi Williston, 1887

= Chalcosyrphus metallifer =

Species of fly

Chalcosyrphus (Xylotomima) metallifer, the Orange-horned Leafwalker, is a rare species of syrphid fly observed in the Eastern United States. Hoverflies can remain nearly motionless in flight. The adults are also known as flower flies for they are commonly found on flowers, from which they get both energy-giving nectar and protein-rich pollen.

== Distribution ==
Canada, United States.
