= Chalcosyrphus latifrons =

Scientific classification
- Kingdom: Animalia
- Phylum: Arthropoda
- Clade: Pancrustacea
- Class: Insecta
- Order: Diptera
- Family: Syrphidae
- Subfamily: Eristalinae
- Tribe: Milesiini
- Subtribe: Xylotina
- Genus: Chalcosyrphus
- Subgenus: Xylotomima
- Species: C. latifrons

Binomial name
- Chalcosyrphus latifrons (Shiraki & Edashige, 1953)

Synonyms
- Brachypalpus hisamatsui Shiraki, 1968; Zelima latifrons Shiraki & Edashige, 1953

Species of fly

Chalcosyrphus latifrons is a species of hoverfly in the family Syrphidae.

== Distribution ==
Japan.
