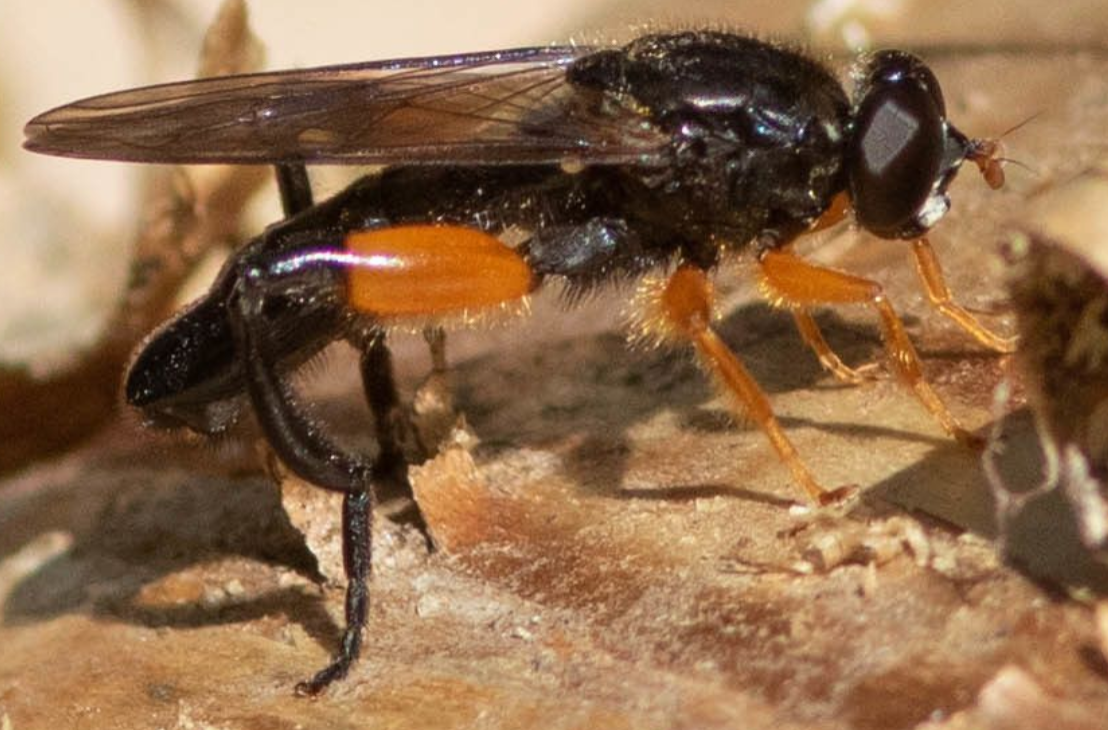

Scientific classification
- Kingdom: Animalia
- Phylum: Arthropoda
- Clade: Pancrustacea
- Class: Insecta
- Order: Diptera
- Family: Syrphidae
- Subfamily: Eristalinae
- Tribe: Milesiini
- Subtribe: Xylotina
- Genus: Chalcosyrphus
- Subgenus: Xylotomima
- Species: C. curvaria

Binomial name
- Chalcosyrphus curvaria (Curran, 1941)

Synonyms
- Heliophilus curvaria Curran, 1941

= Chalcosyrphus curvaria =

Species of fly

Chalcosyrphus (Xylotomima) curvaria, the yellow-haltered leafwalker, is a common species of syrphid fly found throughout Northern North America. Hoverflies can remain nearly motionless in flight. The adults are also known as flower flies for they are commonly found on flowers from which they get both energy-giving nectar and protein rich pollen.

== Distribution ==
Canada, United States.
