= Chalcosyrphus aristatus =

Scientific classification
- Kingdom: Animalia
- Phylum: Arthropoda
- Clade: Pancrustacea
- Class: Insecta
- Order: Diptera
- Family: Syrphidae
- Subfamily: Eristalinae
- Tribe: Milesiini
- Subtribe: Xylotina
- Genus: Chalcosyrphus
- Subgenus: Chalcosyrphus
- Species: C. aristatus

Binomial name
- Chalcosyrphus aristatus (Johnson, 1929)

Synonyms
- Xylota aristata Johnson, 1929

Species of fly

Chalcosyrphus (Chalcosyrphus) aristatus (Johnson 1929), the black-dented leafwalker, is a very rare, species of syrphid fly observed in the Northeastern United States. Hoverflies can remain nearly motionless while in flight. The adults are also known as flower flies for they are commonly found on flowers, from which they get both energy-giving nectar and protein-rich pollen.

== Distribution ==
United States
