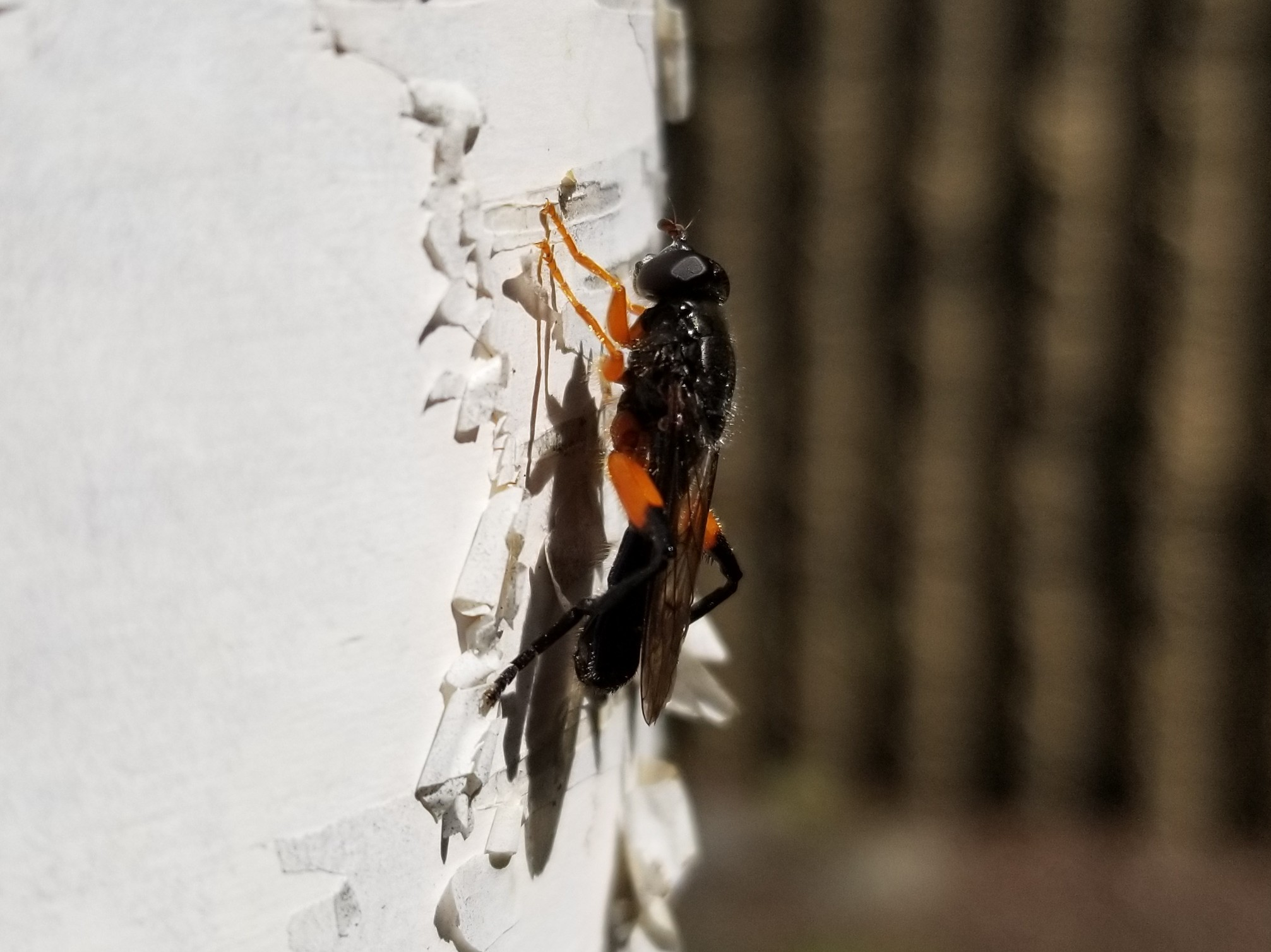

Scientific classification
- Kingdom: Animalia
- Phylum: Arthropoda
- Clade: Pancrustacea
- Class: Insecta
- Order: Diptera
- Family: Syrphidae
- Subfamily: Eristalinae
- Tribe: Milesiini
- Subtribe: Xylotina
- Genus: Chalcosyrphus
- Subgenus: Xylotomima
- Species: C. vecors

Binomial name
- Chalcosyrphus vecors (Osten Sacken, 1875)

Synonyms
- Xylota vecors Osten Sacken, 1875

= Chalcosyrphus vecors =

Species of fly

Chalcosyrphus vecors, the orange-hipped leafwalker, is an uncommon species of syrphid fly observed throughout North America. Hoverflies can remain nearly motionless in flight. The adults are also known as flower flies, for they are commonly found around and on flowers from which they get both energy-giving nectar and protein-rich pollen.

== Distribution ==
Canada, United States.
