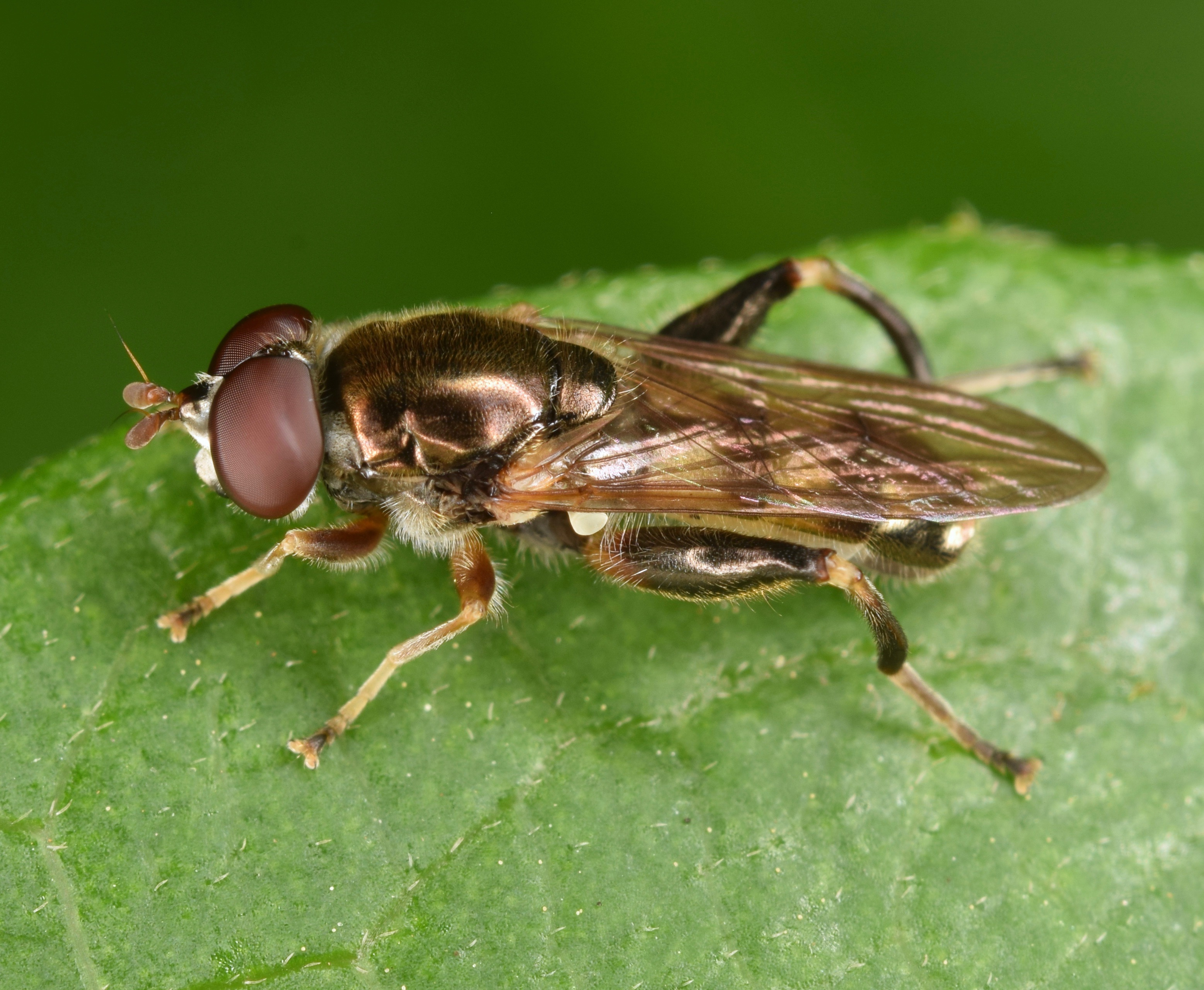

Scientific classification
- Kingdom: Animalia
- Phylum: Arthropoda
- Clade: Pancrustacea
- Class: Insecta
- Order: Diptera
- Family: Syrphidae
- Genus: Chalcosyrphus
- Subgenus: Xylotomima
- Species: C. metallicus

Binomial name
- Chalcosyrphus metallicus (Wiedemann, 1830)

Synonyms
- Xylota althaea Hull, 1943; Xylota astarte Hull, 1943; Xylota dascon Walker, 1849; Xylota metallica Wiedemann, 1830; Xylota primavera Hull, 1944; Xylota subtropicus Curran, 1925

= Chalcosyrphus metallicus =

Species of fly

Chalcosyrphus (Xylotomima) metallicus (Weidemann, 1830), the Yellow-legged Leafwalker, is an uncommon species of syrphid fly observed in the southeastern United States. Hoverflies are able to remain nearly motionless while in flight. The adults are also known as flower flies for they are commonly found around and on flowers, from which they get both energy-giving nectar and protein-rich pollen.
