= Chalcosyrphus nigromaculatus =

Scientific classification
- Kingdom: Animalia
- Phylum: Arthropoda
- Clade: Pancrustacea
- Class: Insecta
- Order: Diptera
- Family: Syrphidae
- Subfamily: Eristalinae
- Tribe: Milesiini
- Subtribe: Xylotina
- Genus: Chalcosyrphus
- Subgenus: Xylotomima
- Species: C. nigromaculatus

Binomial name
- Chalcosyrphus nigromaculatus (Jones, 1917)

Synonyms
- Xylota nigromaculata Stackelberg, 1925; Brachypalpus pigra Lovett, 1919; Xylota cascadensis Weems, 1965

Species of fly

Chalcosyrphus (Xylotomima) nigromaculatus (Jones, 1917), the black-spotted leafwalker, is a rare species of syrphid fly observed in Colorado, British Columbia, Oregon and Utah. Hoverflies can remain nearly motionless while in flight. The adults are also known as flower flies for they are commonly found on flowers, from which they get both energy-giving nectar and protein-rich pollen.

== Distribution ==
Canada, United States.
