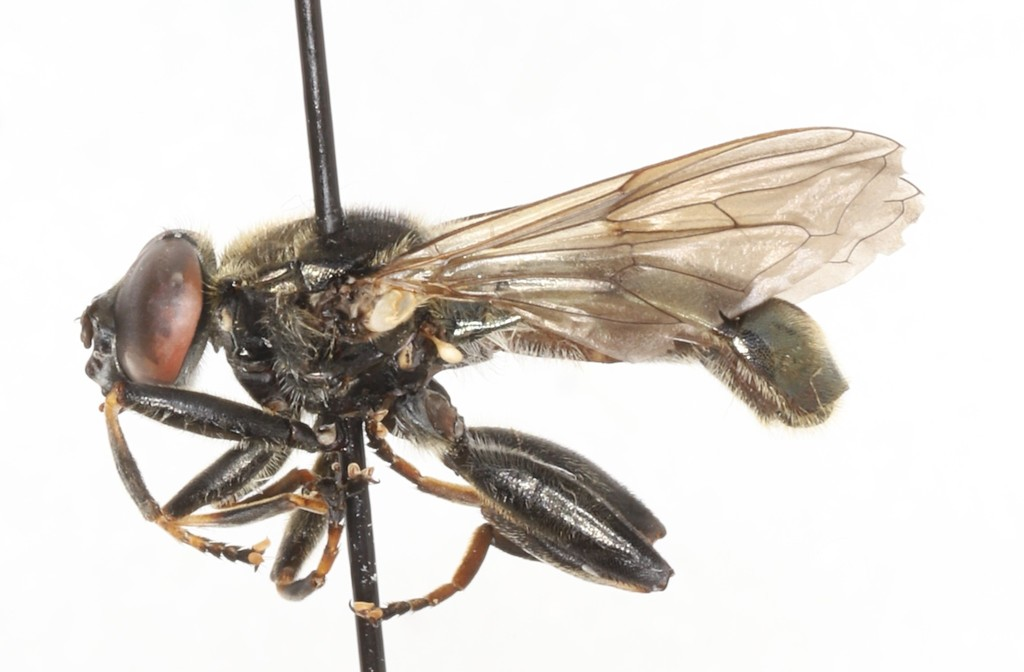

Scientific classification
- Kingdom: Animalia
- Phylum: Arthropoda
- Clade: Pancrustacea
- Class: Insecta
- Order: Diptera
- Family: Syrphidae
- Subfamily: Eristalinae
- Tribe: Milesiini
- Subtribe: Xylotina
- Genus: Chalcosyrphus
- Subgenus: Xylotomima
- Species: C. inarmatus

Binomial name
- Chalcosyrphus inarmatus (Hunter, 1897)

Synonyms
- Brachypalpus apicaudus Curran, 1922; Brachypalpus inarmatus Hunter, 1897; Cynorhina banksi Hull, 1945

= Chalcosyrphus inarmatus =

Species of fly

Chalcosyrphus (Xylotomima) inarmatus (Hunter 1897), the yellow-haired leafwalker, is an uncommon species of syrphid fly found across northern North America. Hoverflies are able to remain nearly motionless in flight. The adults are also known as flower flies for they are commonly found around and on flowers, from which they get both energy-giving nectar and protein-rich pollen.

== Distribution ==
Canada, United States.
