= Chalcosyrphus annulipes =

Scientific classification
- Kingdom: Animalia
- Phylum: Arthropoda
- Clade: Pancrustacea
- Class: Insecta
- Order: Diptera
- Family: Syrphidae
- Subfamily: Eristalinae
- Tribe: Milesiini
- Subtribe: Xylotina
- Genus: Chalcosyrphus
- Subgenus: Syrittoxylota
- Species: C. annulipes

Binomial name
- Chalcosyrphus annulipes (Meijere, 1924)

Synonyms
- Xylota annulipes Meijere, 1924

Species of fly

Chalcosyrphus annulipes is a species of hoverfly in the family Syrphidae.

== Distribution ==
Sumatra.
