= Chalcosyrphus rufipes =

Scientific classification
- Kingdom: Animalia
- Phylum: Arthropoda
- Clade: Pancrustacea
- Class: Insecta
- Order: Diptera
- Family: Syrphidae
- Subfamily: Eristalinae
- Tribe: Milesiini
- Subtribe: Xylotina
- Genus: Chalcosyrphus
- Subgenus: Xylotomima
- Species: C. rufipes

Binomial name
- Chalcosyrphus rufipes (Loew, 1873)

Synonyms
- Xylota rufipes Loew, 1873

Species of fly

Chalcosyrphus rufipes is a species of hoverfly in the family Syrphidae.

== Distribution ==
Romania.
