= Chalcosyrphus elongatus =

Scientific classification
- Kingdom: Animalia
- Phylum: Arthropoda
- Clade: Pancrustacea
- Class: Insecta
- Order: Diptera
- Family: Syrphidae
- Subfamily: Eristalinae
- Tribe: Milesiini
- Subtribe: Xylotina
- Genus: Chalcosyrphus
- Subgenus: Hardimyia
- Species: C. elongatus

Binomial name
- Chalcosyrphus elongatus (Hardy, 1921)

Synonyms
- Chrysotoxum elongatum Hardy, 1921

Species of fly

Chalcosyrphus elongatus is a species of hoverfly in the family Syrphidae.

== Distribution ==
Australia.
