= Chalcosyrphus eugenei =

Scientific classification
- Kingdom: Animalia
- Phylum: Arthropoda
- Clade: Pancrustacea
- Class: Insecta
- Order: Diptera
- Family: Syrphidae
- Subfamily: Eristalinae
- Tribe: Milesiini
- Subtribe: Xylotina
- Genus: Chalcosyrphus
- Species: C. eugenei

Binomial name
- Chalcosyrphus eugenei Mutin, 1987

Species of fly

Chalcosyrphus eugenei is a species of hoverfly in the family Syrphidae.

== Distribution ==
Russia.
