= Chalcosyrphus jacobsoni =

Scientific classification
- Kingdom: Animalia
- Phylum: Arthropoda
- Clade: Pancrustacea
- Class: Insecta
- Order: Diptera
- Family: Syrphidae
- Subfamily: Eristalinae
- Tribe: Milesiini
- Subtribe: Xylotina
- Genus: Chalcosyrphus
- Subgenus: Xylotomima
- Species: C. jacobsoni

Binomial name
- Chalcosyrphus jacobsoni (Stackelberg, 1921)

Synonyms
- Xylota jacobsoni Stackelberg, 1921; Myiolepta helophiloides Kanervo, 1938

Species of fly

Chalcosyrphus jacobsoni is a species of hoverfly in the family Syrphidae.

== Distribution ==
Russia.
