= Chalcosyrphus ornatipes =

Scientific classification
- Kingdom: Animalia
- Phylum: Arthropoda
- Clade: Pancrustacea
- Class: Insecta
- Order: Diptera
- Family: Syrphidae
- Subfamily: Eristalinae
- Tribe: Milesiini
- Subtribe: Xylotina
- Genus: Chalcosyrphus
- Subgenus: Syrittoxylota
- Species: C. ornatipes

Binomial name
- Chalcosyrphus ornatipes (Sack, 1927)

Synonyms
- Xylota ornatipes Sack, 1927

Species of fly

Chalcosyrphus ornatipes is a species of hoverfly in the family Syrphidae.

== Distribution ==
Taiwan.
