= Chalcosyrphus victoriensis =

Scientific classification
- Kingdom: Animalia
- Phylum: Arthropoda
- Clade: Pancrustacea
- Class: Insecta
- Order: Diptera
- Family: Syrphidae
- Subfamily: Eristalinae
- Tribe: Milesiini
- Subtribe: Xylotina
- Genus: Chalcosyrphus
- Subgenus: Neploneura
- Species: C. victoriensis

Binomial name
- Chalcosyrphus victoriensis (Ferguson, 1926)

Synonyms
- Xylota victoriensis Ferguson, 1926

Species of fly

Chalcosyrphus victoriensis is a species of hoverfly in the family Syrphidae.

== Distribution ==
Australia.
