= Chalcosyrphus atopos =

Scientific classification
- Kingdom: Animalia
- Phylum: Arthropoda
- Clade: Pancrustacea
- Class: Insecta
- Order: Diptera
- Family: Syrphidae
- Subfamily: Eristalinae
- Tribe: Milesiini
- Subtribe: Xylotina
- Genus: Chalcosyrphus
- Subgenus: Xylotina
- Species: C. atopos

Binomial name
- Chalcosyrphus atopos Yang & Cheng, 1998

Species of fly

Chalcosyrphus atopos is a species of hoverfly in the family Syrphidae.

== Distribution ==
China.
