= Chalcosyrphus parvus =

Scientific classification
- Kingdom: Animalia
- Phylum: Arthropoda
- Clade: Pancrustacea
- Class: Insecta
- Order: Diptera
- Family: Syrphidae
- Subfamily: Eristalinae
- Tribe: Milesiini
- Subtribe: Xylotina
- Genus: Chalcosyrphus
- Subgenus: Xylotomima
- Species: C. parvus

Binomial name
- Chalcosyrphus parvus (Williston, 1887)

Synonyms
- Brachypalpus parvus Williston, 1887

Species of fly

Chalcosyrphus parvus is a species of syrphid fly in the family Syrphidae.

== Distribution ==
Canada, United States.
