= Chalcosyrphus pleuralis =

Scientific classification
- Kingdom: Animalia
- Phylum: Arthropoda
- Clade: Pancrustacea
- Class: Insecta
- Order: Diptera
- Family: Syrphidae
- Subfamily: Eristalinae
- Tribe: Milesiini
- Subtribe: Xylotina
- Genus: Chalcosyrphus
- Subgenus: Neploneura
- Species: C. pleuralis

Binomial name
- Chalcosyrphus pleuralis (Kertész, 1901)

Synonyms
- Xylota pleuralis Kertész, 1901

Species of fly

Chalcosyrphus pleuralis is a species of hoverfly in the family Syrphidae.

== Distribution ==
Australia.
