= Chalcosyrphus satanicus =

Scientific classification
- Kingdom: Animalia
- Phylum: Arthropoda
- Clade: Pancrustacea
- Class: Insecta
- Order: Diptera
- Family: Syrphidae
- Subfamily: Eristalinae
- Tribe: Milesiini
- Subtribe: Xylotina
- Genus: Chalcosyrphus
- Subgenus: Xylotomima
- Species: C. satanicus

Binomial name
- Chalcosyrphus satanicus (Bigot, 1884)

Synonyms
- Xylota satanica Bigot, 1884

Species of fly

Chalcosyrphus satanicus is a species of hoverfly in the family Syrphidae.

== Distribution ==
Canada, United States.
