= Chalcosyrphus eumerus =

Scientific classification
- Kingdom: Animalia
- Phylum: Arthropoda
- Clade: Pancrustacea
- Class: Insecta
- Order: Diptera
- Family: Syrphidae
- Subfamily: Eristalinae
- Tribe: Milesiini
- Subtribe: Xylotina
- Genus: Chalcosyrphus
- Subgenus: Dimorphoxylota
- Species: C. eumerus

Binomial name
- Chalcosyrphus eumerus (Loew, 1869)

Synonyms
- Xylota eumera Loew, 1869; Xylota pictipes Loew, 1871

Species of fly

Chalcosyrphus eumerus is a species of Hoverfly in the family Syrphidae.

== Distribution ==
Russia.
