= Chalcosyrphus calopus =

Scientific classification
- Kingdom: Animalia
- Phylum: Arthropoda
- Clade: Pancrustacea
- Class: Insecta
- Order: Diptera
- Family: Syrphidae
- Subfamily: Eristalinae
- Tribe: Milesiini
- Subtribe: Xylotina
- Genus: Chalcosyrphus
- Subgenus: Xylotina
- Species: C. calopus

Binomial name
- Chalcosyrphus calopus (Bigot, 1884)

Synonyms
- Xylota calopus Bigot, 1884

Species of fly

Chalcosyrphus calopus is a species of hoverfly in the family Syrphidae.

== Distribution ==
Java.
