= Chalcosyrphus ventralis =

Scientific classification
- Kingdom: Animalia
- Phylum: Arthropoda
- Clade: Pancrustacea
- Class: Insecta
- Order: Diptera
- Family: Syrphidae
- Subfamily: Eristalinae
- Tribe: Milesiini
- Subtribe: Xylotina
- Genus: Chalcosyrphus
- Subgenus: Neploneura
- Species: C. ventralis

Binomial name
- Chalcosyrphus ventralis (Walker, 1858)

Synonyms
- Xylota ventralis Walker, 1858

Species of fly

Chalcosyrphus ventralis is a species of hoverfly in the family Syrphidae.

== Distribution ==
Aru Islands.
