= Chalcosyrphus doris =

Scientific classification
- Kingdom: Animalia
- Phylum: Arthropoda
- Clade: Pancrustacea
- Class: Insecta
- Order: Diptera
- Family: Syrphidae
- Subfamily: Eristalinae
- Tribe: Milesiini
- Subtribe: Xylotina
- Genus: Chalcosyrphus
- Subgenus: Xylotina
- Species: C. doris

Binomial name
- Chalcosyrphus doris (Curran, 1928)

Synonyms
- Xylota doris Curran, 1928

Species of fly

Chalcosyrphus doris is a species of hoverfly in the family Syrphidae.

== Distribution ==
Malaysia.
