= Chalcosyrphus bettyae =

Scientific classification
- Kingdom: Animalia
- Phylum: Arthropoda
- Clade: Pancrustacea
- Class: Insecta
- Order: Diptera
- Family: Syrphidae
- Subfamily: Eristalinae
- Tribe: Milesiini
- Subtribe: Xylotina
- Genus: Chalcosyrphus
- Subgenus: Neplas
- Species: C. bettyae

Binomial name
- Chalcosyrphus bettyae (Thompson, 1981)

Synonyms
- Neplas bettyae Thompson, 1981

Species of fly

Chalcosyrphus bettyae is a species of hoverfly in the family Syrphidae.

== Distribution ==
C. bettyae can be found in Cuba.
