= Chalcosyrphus admirabilis =

Scientific classification
- Kingdom: Animalia
- Phylum: Arthropoda
- Clade: Pancrustacea
- Class: Insecta
- Order: Diptera
- Family: Syrphidae
- Subfamily: Eristalinae
- Tribe: Milesiini
- Subtribe: Xylotina
- Genus: Chalcosyrphus
- Subgenus: Chalcosyrphus
- Species: C. admirabilis

Binomial name
- Chalcosyrphus admirabilis Mutin, 1984

Species of fly

Chalcosyrphus admirabilis is a species of syrphid fly in the family Syrphidae.

== Distribution ==
Russia.
