= Chalcosyrphus quantulus =

Scientific classification
- Kingdom: Animalia
- Phylum: Arthropoda
- Clade: Pancrustacea
- Class: Insecta
- Order: Diptera
- Family: Syrphidae
- Subfamily: Eristalinae
- Tribe: Milesiini
- Subtribe: Xylotina
- Genus: Chalcosyrphus
- Subgenus: Syrittoxylota
- Species: C. quantulus

Binomial name
- Chalcosyrphus quantulus Hippa, 1985

Species of fly

Chalcosyrphus quantulus is a species of syrphid fly in the family Syrphidae.

== Distribution ==
Myanmar.
