= Chalcosyrphus annulatus =

Scientific classification
- Kingdom: Animalia
- Phylum: Arthropoda
- Clade: Pancrustacea
- Class: Insecta
- Order: Diptera
- Family: Syrphidae
- Subfamily: Eristalinae
- Tribe: Milesiini
- Subtribe: Xylotina
- Genus: Chalcosyrphus
- Subgenus: Syrittoxylota
- Species: C. annulatus

Binomial name
- Chalcosyrphus annulatus (Brunetti, 1913)

Synonyms
- Xylota annulata Brunetti, 1913

Species of fly

Chalcosyrphus annulatus is a species of hoverfly in the family Syrphidae.

== Distribution ==
India, Laos, Malaysia.
