= Chalcosyrphus vagans =

Scientific classification
- Kingdom: Animalia
- Phylum: Arthropoda
- Clade: Pancrustacea
- Class: Insecta
- Order: Diptera
- Family: Syrphidae
- Subfamily: Eristalinae
- Tribe: Milesiini
- Subtribe: Xylotina
- Genus: Chalcosyrphus
- Subgenus: Neplas
- Species: C. vagans

Binomial name
- Chalcosyrphus vagans (Wiedemann, 1830)

Synonyms
- Xylota vagans Wiedemann, 1830; Syritta mexicana Bigot, 1884

Species of fly

Chalcosyrphus vagans is a species of hoverfly in the family Syrphidae.

== Distribution ==
Panama, Guyana, Brazil.
