= Chalcosyrphus americanus =

Scientific classification
- Kingdom: Animalia
- Phylum: Arthropoda
- Clade: Pancrustacea
- Class: Insecta
- Order: Diptera
- Family: Syrphidae
- Subfamily: Eristalinae
- Tribe: Milesiini
- Subtribe: Xylotina
- Genus: Chalcosyrphus
- Subgenus: Neplas
- Species: C. americanus

Binomial name
- Chalcosyrphus americanus (Schiner, 1868)

Synonyms
- Syritta americana Schiner, 1868

Species of fly

Chalcosyrphus americanus is a species of hoverfly in the family Syrphidae.

== Distribution ==
South America.
