= Chalcosyrphus discolor =

Scientific classification
- Kingdom: Animalia
- Phylum: Arthropoda
- Clade: Pancrustacea
- Class: Insecta
- Order: Diptera
- Family: Syrphidae
- Subfamily: Eristalinae
- Tribe: Milesiini
- Subtribe: Xylotina
- Genus: Chalcosyrphus
- Subgenus: Xylotomima
- Species: C. discolor

Binomial name
- Chalcosyrphus discolor (Shiraki, 1968)

Synonyms
- Xylota discolor Shiraki, 1968

Species of fly

Chalcosyrphus discolor is a species of hoverfly in the family Syrphidae.

== Distribution ==
Japan.
