= Chalcosyrphus auricomus =

Scientific classification
- Kingdom: Animalia
- Phylum: Arthropoda
- Clade: Pancrustacea
- Class: Insecta
- Order: Diptera
- Family: Syrphidae
- Subfamily: Eristalinae
- Tribe: Milesiini
- Subtribe: Xylotina
- Genus: Chalcosyrphus
- Subgenus: Syrittoxylota
- Species: C. auricomus

Binomial name
- Chalcosyrphus auricomus Hippa, 1985

Species of fly

Chalcosyrphus auricomus is a species of Hoverfly in the family Syrphidae.

== Distribution ==
Myanmar.
