= Chalcosyrphus auripygus =

Scientific classification
- Kingdom: Animalia
- Phylum: Arthropoda
- Clade: Pancrustacea
- Class: Insecta
- Order: Diptera
- Family: Syrphidae
- Subfamily: Eristalinae
- Tribe: Milesiini
- Subtribe: Xylotina
- Genus: Chalcosyrphus
- Subgenus: Cheiroxylota
- Species: C. auripygus

Binomial name
- Chalcosyrphus auripygus Hippa, 1978

Species of fly

Chalcosyrphus auripygus is a species of hoverfly in the family Syrphidae.

== Distribution ==
Myanmar.
