= Chalcosyrphus obscura =

Scientific classification
- Kingdom: Animalia
- Phylum: Arthropoda
- Clade: Pancrustacea
- Class: Insecta
- Order: Diptera
- Family: Syrphidae
- Subfamily: Eristalinae
- Tribe: Milesiini
- Subtribe: Xylotina
- Genus: Chalcosyrphus
- Subgenus: Spheginoides
- Species: C. obscura

Binomial name
- Chalcosyrphus obscura (Szilády, 1939)

Synonyms
- Spheginoides obscura Szilády, 1939

Species of fly

Chalcosyrphus obscura is a species of hoverfly in the family Syrphidae.

== Distribution ==
Carpathian Mountains.
