= Chalcosyrphus maculiquadratus =

Scientific classification
- Kingdom: Animalia
- Phylum: Arthropoda
- Clade: Pancrustacea
- Class: Insecta
- Order: Diptera
- Family: Syrphidae
- Subfamily: Eristalinae
- Tribe: Milesiini
- Subtribe: Xylotina
- Genus: Chalcosyrphus
- Subgenus: Xylotina
- Species: C. maculiquadratus

Binomial name
- Chalcosyrphus maculiquadratus Chang & Yang, 1993

Species of fly

Chalcosyrphus maculiquadratus is a species of hoverfly in the family Syrphidae.

== Distribution ==
China.
