= Chalcosyrphus nitidus =

Scientific classification
- Kingdom: Animalia
- Phylum: Arthropoda
- Clade: Pancrustacea
- Class: Insecta
- Order: Diptera
- Family: Syrphidae
- Subfamily: Eristalinae
- Tribe: Milesiini
- Subtribe: Xylotina
- Genus: Chalcosyrphus
- Subgenus: Xylotomima
- Species: C. nitidus

Binomial name
- Chalcosyrphus nitidus (Portschinsky, 1879)

Synonyms
- Xylota nitida Portschinsky, 1879

Species of fly

Chalcosyrphus nitidus is a species of hoverfly in the family Syrphidae.

== Distribution ==
Russia.
