= Chalcosyrphus japonicus =

Scientific classification
- Kingdom: Animalia
- Phylum: Arthropoda
- Clade: Pancrustacea
- Class: Insecta
- Order: Diptera
- Family: Syrphidae
- Subfamily: Eristalinae
- Tribe: Milesiini
- Subtribe: Xylotina
- Genus: Chalcosyrphus
- Subgenus: Xylotodes
- Species: C. japonicus

Binomial name
- Chalcosyrphus japonicus (Shiraki, 1930)

Synonyms
- Myiolepta japonica Shiraki, 1930; Chalcosyrphus tokuickii Ichige, 2005

Species of fly

Chalcosyrphus japonicus is a species of hoverfly in the family Syrphidae.

== Distribution ==
Japan.
