= Chalcosyrphus dimidiatus =

Scientific classification
- Kingdom: Animalia
- Phylum: Arthropoda
- Clade: Pancrustacea
- Class: Insecta
- Order: Diptera
- Family: Syrphidae
- Subfamily: Eristalinae
- Tribe: Milesiini
- Subtribe: Xylotina
- Genus: Chalcosyrphus
- Subgenus: Cheiroxylota
- Species: C. dimidiatus

Binomial name
- Chalcosyrphus dimidiatus (Brunetti, 1923)

Synonyms
- Xylota dimidiata Brunetti, 1923

Species of fly

Chalcosyrphus dimidiatus is a species of hoverfly in the family Syrphidae.

== Distribution ==
Nepal, Pakistan.
