= Chalcosyrphus tuberculifemur =

Scientific classification
- Kingdom: Animalia
- Phylum: Arthropoda
- Clade: Pancrustacea
- Class: Insecta
- Order: Diptera
- Family: Syrphidae
- Subfamily: Eristalinae
- Tribe: Milesiini
- Subtribe: Xylotina
- Genus: Chalcosyrphus
- Subgenus: Chalcosyrphus
- Species: C. tuberculifemur

Binomial name
- Chalcosyrphus tuberculifemur (Stackelberg, 1963)

Synonyms
- Xylota tuberculifemur Stackelberg, 1963

Species of fly

Chalcosyrphus tuberculifemur is a species of hoverfly in the family Syrphidae.

== Distribution ==
Russia.
