= Chalcosyrphus grisea =

Scientific classification
- Kingdom: Animalia
- Phylum: Arthropoda
- Clade: Pancrustacea
- Class: Insecta
- Order: Diptera
- Family: Syrphidae
- Subfamily: Eristalinae
- Tribe: Milesiini
- Subtribe: Xylotina
- Genus: Chalcosyrphus
- Subgenus: Neplas
- Species: C. grisea

Binomial name
- Chalcosyrphus grisea (Hull, 1941)

Synonyms
- Planes grisea Hull, 1948

Species of fly

Chalcosyrphus grisea is a species of hoverfly in the family Syrphidae.

== Distribution ==
Brazil.
