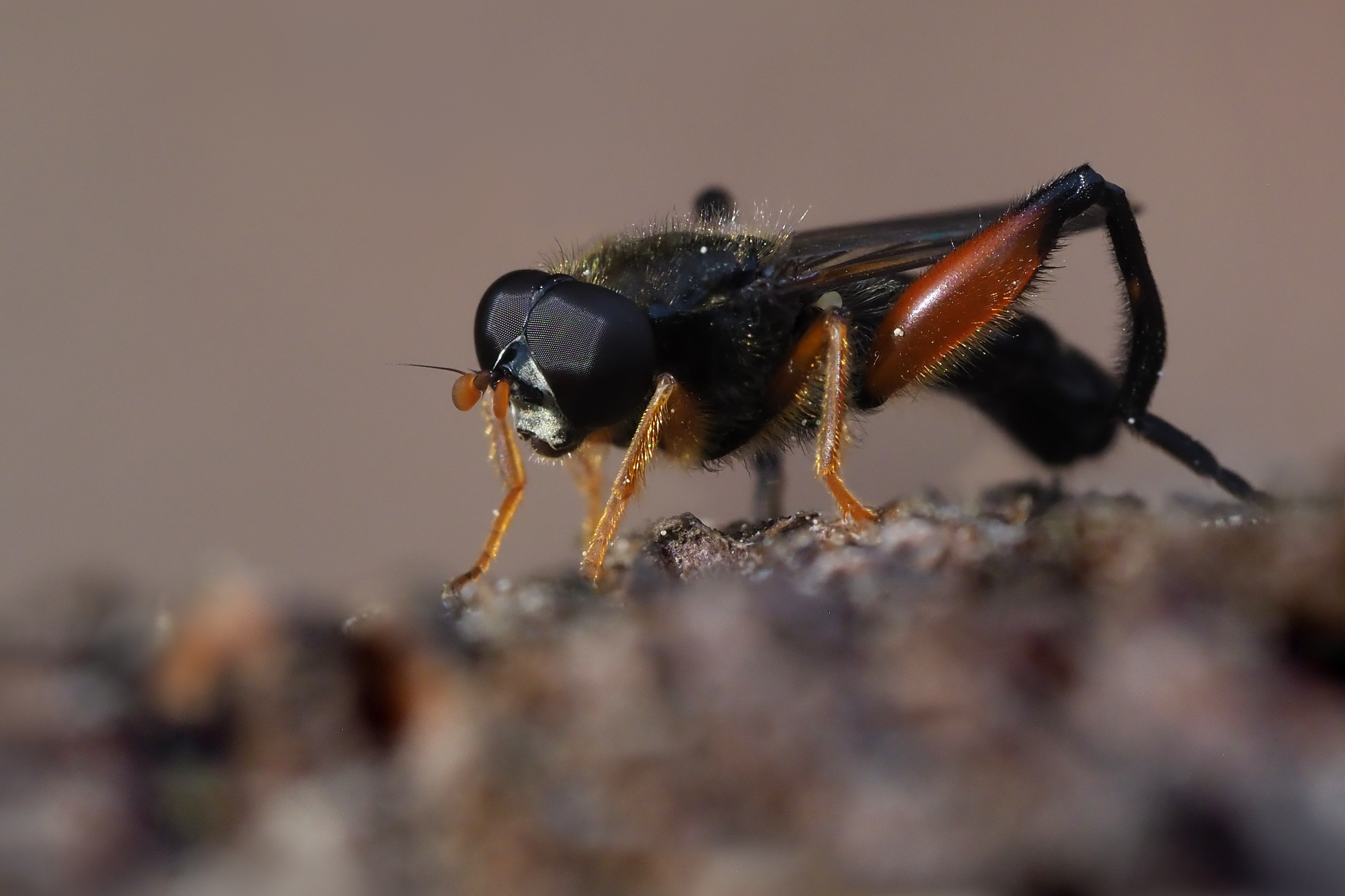
- Image of Chalcosyrphus femoratus

Scientific classification
- Kingdom: Animalia
- Phylum: Arthropoda
- Clade: Pancrustacea
- Class: Insecta
- Order: Diptera
- Family: Syrphidae
- Subfamily: Eristalinae
- Tribe: Milesiini
- Subtribe: Xylotina
- Genus: Chalcosyrphus
- Subgenus: Xylotomima
- Species: C. femoratus

Binomial name
- Chalcosyrphus femoratus (Linnaeus, 1758)

Synonyms
- Musca femorata Linnaeus, 1758, 1758; Xylota curvipes Loew, 1854

= Chalcosyrphus femoratus =

Species of fly

Chalcosyrphus femoratus is a species of syrphid fly in the family Syrphidae.

== Distribution ==
Canada, United States.
