= Chalcosyrphus ornata =

Scientific classification
- Kingdom: Animalia
- Phylum: Arthropoda
- Clade: Pancrustacea
- Class: Insecta
- Order: Diptera
- Family: Syrphidae
- Subfamily: Eristalinae
- Tribe: Milesiini
- Subtribe: Xylotina
- Genus: Chalcosyrphus
- Subgenus: Xylotina
- Species: C. ornata

Binomial name
- Chalcosyrphus ornata (Brunetti, 1915)

Synonyms
- Merodon ornatus Brunetti, 1915

Species of fly

Chalcosyrphus ornata is a species of hoverfly in the family Syrphidae.

== Distribution ==
India.
