= Chalcosyrphus decorus =

Scientific classification
- Kingdom: Animalia
- Phylum: Arthropoda
- Clade: Pancrustacea
- Class: Insecta
- Order: Diptera
- Family: Syrphidae
- Subfamily: Eristalinae
- Tribe: Milesiini
- Subtribe: Xylotina
- Genus: Chalcosyrphus
- Subgenus: Xylotina
- Species: C. decorus

Binomial name
- Chalcosyrphus decorus (Meijere, 1914)

Synonyms
- Xylota decorus Meijere, 1914

Species of fly

Chalcosyrphus decorus is a species of hoverfly in the family Syrphidae.

== Distribution ==
Java.
