= Chalcosyrphus shirakii =

Scientific classification
- Kingdom: Animalia
- Phylum: Arthropoda
- Clade: Pancrustacea
- Class: Insecta
- Order: Diptera
- Family: Syrphidae
- Subfamily: Eristalinae
- Tribe: Milesiini
- Subtribe: Xylotina
- Genus: Chalcosyrphus
- Subgenus: Syrittoxylota
- Species: C. shirakii

Binomial name
- Chalcosyrphus shirakii Hippa, 1985

Synonyms
- Xylota annulipes Shiraki, 1968

Species of fly

Chalcosyrphus shirakii is a species of syrphid fly in the family Syrphidae.

== Distribution ==
Japan.
