= Valgu =

Valgu may refer to several places in Estonia:

- Valgu, Hiiu County, a village in Emmaste Parish, Hiiu County
- Valgu, Rapla County, a village in Märjamaa Parish, Rapla County
