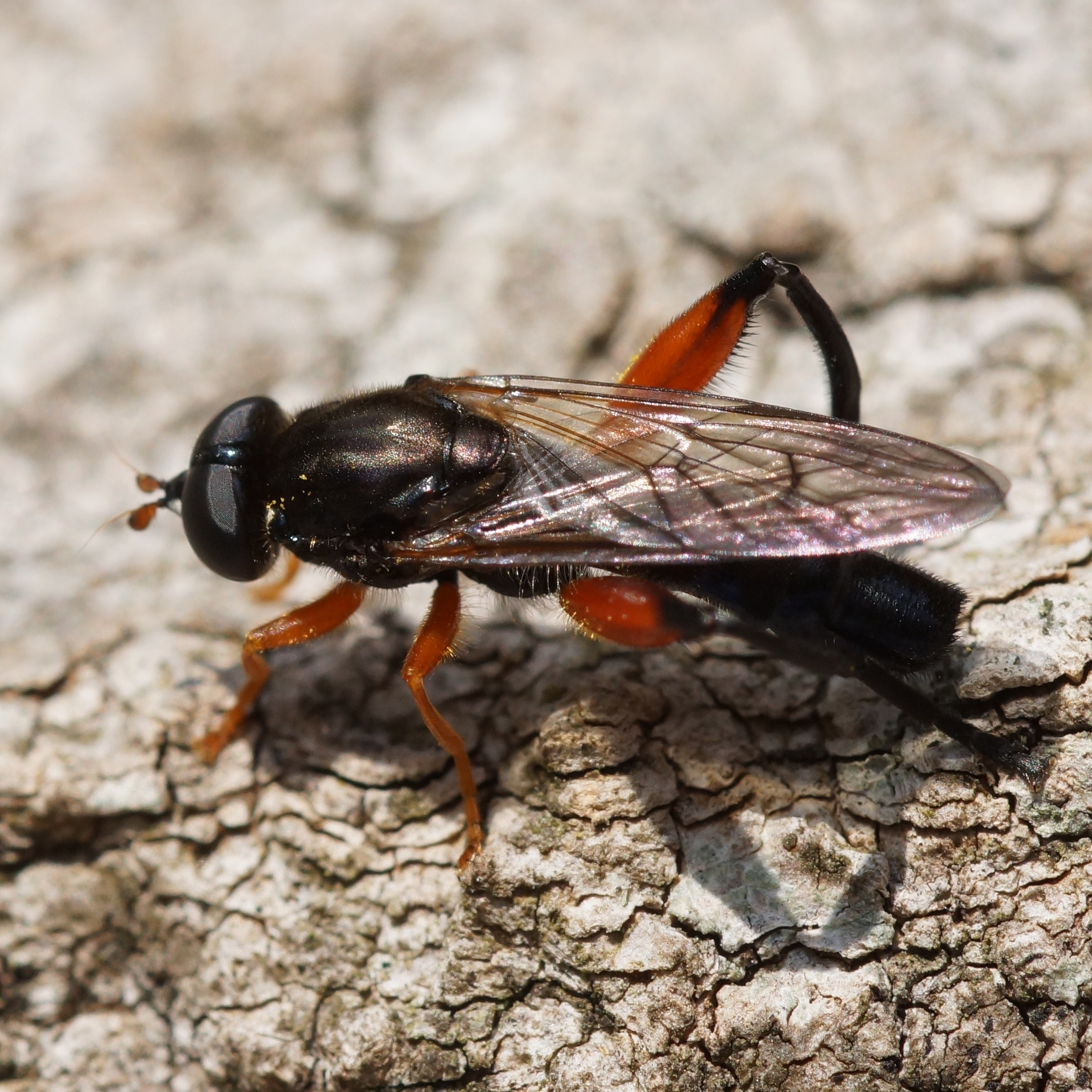
- male

Scientific classification
- Kingdom: Animalia
- Phylum: Arthropoda
- Clade: Pancrustacea
- Class: Insecta
- Order: Diptera
- Family: Syrphidae
- Subfamily: Eristalinae
- Tribe: Milesiini
- Subtribe: Xylotina
- Genus: Chalcosyrphus
- Subgenus: Chalcosyrphus
- Species: C. valgus

Binomial name
- Chalcosyrphus valgus (Gmelin, 1790)

Synonyms
- Musca valga Gmelin, 1790; Syrphus volvulus Fabricius, 1794; Zelima sapporoensis Shiraki, 1930

= Chalcosyrphus valgus =

Species of fly

Chalcosyrphus valgus is a medium-sized species of hoverfly with a widespread range throughout the Palearctic region.

== Distribution ==
Europe, Japan.
