= Chalcosyrphus =

- Chalcosyrphus violascens female

Scientific classification
- Kingdom: Animalia
- Phylum: Arthropoda
- Clade: Pancrustacea
- Class: Insecta
- Order: Diptera
- Family: Syrphidae
- Subfamily: Eristalinae
- Tribe: Milesiini
- Subtribe: Xylotina
- Genus: Chalcosyrphus; Curran, 1925

Type species
- Chalcosyrphus atra Curran, 1925

Subgenera
- Chalcosyrphus Curran, 1925; Cheiroxylota Hull, 1949; Dimorphoxylota Hippa, 1978; Hardimyia Ferguson, 1926; Neplas Porter, 1927; Neploneura Hippa, 1978; Spheginoides Szilády, 1939; Syrittoxylota Hippa, 1978; Xylotina Hippa, 1978; Xylotodes Shannon, 1926; Xylotomima Shannon, 1926

Synonyms
- Planes Rondani, 1863

Genus of flies

Chalcosyrphus is a genus of hoverflies in the subfamily Eristalinae. Many species exhibit some degree of mimicry of various sawflies and other hymenopterans and are often brightly coloured or metallic in hue. The adults are similar in structure and behavior to the related genus Xylota but differ in larval morphology. They can be found throughout Europe, Asia, and North America and seem to prefer damper, boggy habitats. The larvae are saproxylic feeders in rotten wood in these habitats.

== Species ==
Subgenus: Chalcosyrphus
- C. admirabilis Mutin, 1984
- C. aristatus (Johnson, 1929)
- C. depressus (Shannon, 1925)
- C. tuberculifemur (Stackelberg, 1963)
- C. valgus (Gmelin, 1790)

Subgenus: Cheiroxylota

- C. auripygus Hippa, 1978
- C. dimidiatus (Brunetti, 1923)

Subgenus: Dimorphoxylota

- C. eumerus (Loew, 1869)

Subgenus: Hardimyia

- C. elongatus (Hardy, 1921)

Subgenus: Neplas

- C. americanus (Schiner, 1868)
- C. ariel (Curran, 1941)
- C. armatipes (Curran, 1941)
- C. azteca (Curran, 1941)
- C. bettyae (Thompson, 1981)
- C. bidens (Curran, 1941)
- C. boliviensis (Shannon, 1926)
- C. chlorops (Hull, 1948)
- C. chrysopressa (Hull, 1941)
- C. cuprescens (Hull, 1941)
- C. frontalis (Curran, 1941)
- C. grandifemoralis (Curran, 1934)
- C. grisea (Hull, 1941)
- C. lyrica (Curran, 1941)
- C. minor (Shannon, 1926)
- C. pachymera (Loew, 1866)
- C. palitarsis (Curran, 1934)
- C. panamena (Curran, 1941)
- C. pauxilla (Williston, 1892)
- C. pretiosus (Loew, 1861)
- C. proxima (Hull, 1944)
- C. puma (Curran, 1941)
- C. rondanii (Shannon, 1926)
- C. sapphirina (Hull, 1951)
- C. schildi (Shannon, 1926)
- C. smarti (Curran, 1941)
- C. vagabondans (Hull, 1941)
- C. vagans (Wiedemann, 1830)
- C. valeria (Hull, 1941)

Subgenus: Neploneura

- C. melanocephalus Hippa, 1978
- C. pleuralis (Kertész, 1901)
- C. ventralis (Walker, 1858)
- C. victoriensis (Ferguson, 1926)

Subgenus: Spheginoides

- C. obscura (Szilády, 1939)

Subgenus: Syrittoxylota

- C. annulatus (Brunetti, 1913)
- C. annulipes (Meijere, 1924)
- C. auricomus Hippa, 1985
- C. elegans (Hippa, 1985)
- C. ornatipes (Sack, 1927)
- C. quantulus Hippa, 1985
- C. shirakii Hippa, 1985

Subgenus: Xylotina

- C. atopos Yang & Cheng, 1998
- C. calopus (Bigot, 1884)
- C. choui He & Chu, 1992
- C. decorus (Meijere, 1914)
- C. doris (Curran, 1928)
- C. jiangi He & Chu, 1997
- C. maculiquadratus Chang & Yang, 1993
- C. nepalensis Hippa, 1978
- C. ornata (Brunetti, 1915)

Subgenus: Xylotodes

- C. ambiguum (Shiraki, 1968)
- C. eunotus (Loew, 1873)
- C. japonicus (Shiraki, 1930)
- C. nigricans (Shiraki, 1968)
- C. fortis He & Chu, 1995

Subgenus: Xylotomima

- C. acoetes Séguy, 1948
- C. amurensis (Stackelberg, 1925)
- C. anomalus (Shannon, 1925)
- C. anthreas (Walker, 1849)
- C. carbonus (Violovitsh, 1975)
- C. curvaria (Curran, 1941)
- C. discolor (Shiraki, 1968)
- C. dubius (Shannon, 1926)
- C. femoratus (Linnaeus, 1758)
- C. flexus (Curran, 1941)
- C. inarmatus (Hunter, 1897)
- C. jacobsoni (Stackelberg, 1921)
- C. libo (Walker, 1849)
- C. longus (Coquillett, 1898)
- C. metallicus (Wiedemann, 1830)
- C. metallifer (Bigot, 1884)
- C. nemorum (Fabricius, 1805)
- C. nigripes (Zetterstedt, 1838)
- C. nigromaculatus (Jones, 1917)
- C. nitidus (Portschinsky, 1879)
- C. ontario (Curran, 1941)
- C. pannonicus (Oldenberg, 1916)
- C. parvus (Williston, 1887)
- C. piger (Fabricius, 1794)
- C. plesia (Curran, 1925)
- C. rufipes (Loew, 1873)
- C. sacawajeae (Shannon, 1926)
- C. satanicus (Bigot, 1884)
- C. satanica (Bigot, 1884)
- C. vecors (Osten Sacken, 1875)
- C. violascens (Megerle, 1803)
- C. violovitshi (Bagatshanova, 1985)

Unplaced

- C. amaculatus Huo, Ren & Zheng, 2007
- C. eugenei Mutin, 1987

== Bibliography ==
- Stubbs, Alan E.; Falk, Steven J (1983). British Hoverflies: An Illustrated Identification Guide (2nd ed.). London: British Entomological and Natural History Society. pp. 253, xvpp. ISBN 1-899935-03-7.
- Thompson, F. C. (1975). "Notes on the status and relationships of some genera in the tribe Milesiini (Diptera: Syrphidae)" (PDF). Proceedings of the Entomological Society of Washington. 77 (3): 291–305.
- Van Veen, M.P. (2004). Hoverflies of Northwest Europe, Identification Keys to the Syrphidae (Hardback). Utrecht: KNNV Publishing. p. 254. ISBN 90-5011-199-8.
