= Raymond Corbett Shannon =

American entomologist

Raymond Corbett Shannon (October 4, 1894 – March 7, 1945) was an American entomologist who specialised in Diptera and medical entomology.

== Life and career ==
Shannon was born in Washington, D.C. He was orphaned as a child. His studies at Cornell University were interrupted by World War I, but he received his B.S. there in 1923. He was employed by the U.S. Bureau of Entomology from 1912 to 1916 and 1923 to 1925. In 1926, he began graduate studies at George Washington University, and from 1927, he was employed by the International Health Division of the Rockefeller Foundation.

He published over 100 articles on the characteristics, environment, and behavior of insects and on their aspects as disease vectors. One of his discoveries, in 1930, was the arrival of Anopheles gambiae, the mosquito that carries malaria, into the New World.

On his death at the age of 50, he left his library and insect collection to the Smithsonian Institution.

His wife was Elnora Pettit (1906-2009), née Sutherlin, who as a widow married Emmett Elijah Hundley (1894-1957), manager of the American Tobacco Company of the Orient based in Turkey. His son was DePaul University accounting professor Donald Sutherlin Shannon, and his grandson is Academy Award-nominated actor Michael Shannon.
