= Nectarivore =

Animal in which nectar is a main source of nutrition in their diet

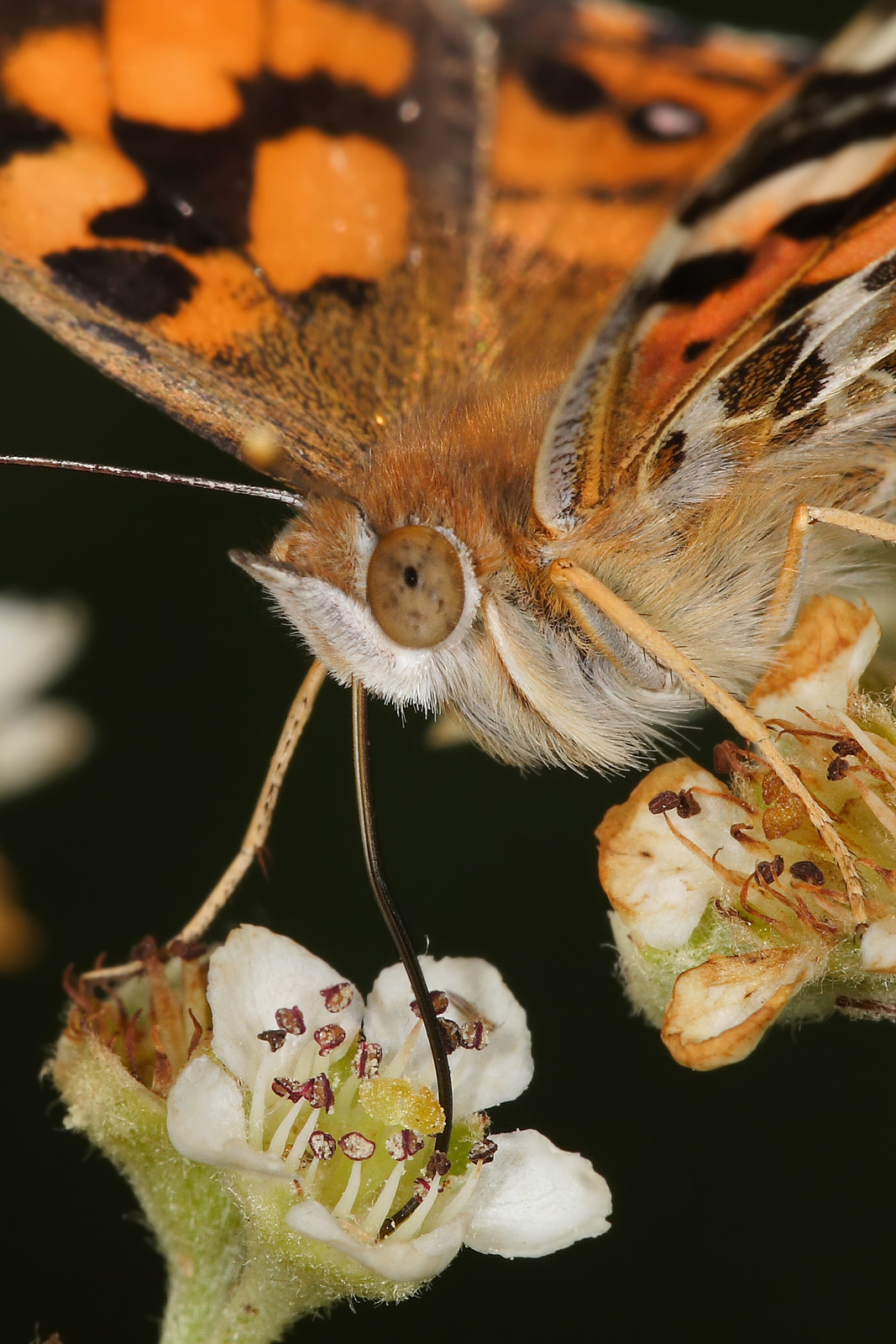
An Australian painted lady (Vanessa kershawi) feeding on nectar through its long proboscis

In zoology, a nectarivore is an animal which derives its energy and nutrient requirements from a diet consisting mainly or exclusively of the sugar-rich nectar produced by flowering plants.

Nectar as a food source presents a number of benefits as well as challenges. It is essentially a solution of (as much as 80%) the simple sugars sucrose, glucose and fructose, which are easily ingested and digested, representing a rich and efficient source of nutrition. This solution is often diluted either by the plant that produces it or by rain falling on a flower and many nectarivores possess adaptations to effectively rid themselves of any excess water ingested this way.

However, nectar is an incomplete source of nutrition. While it does contain proteins and amino acids, these are found in low quantities, and it is severely deficient in minerals and vitamins. Very few organisms consume nectar exclusively over their whole life cycle, either supplementing it with other sources, particularly insects (thus overlapping with insectivores) or only consuming it exclusively for a set period. Many species are nectar robbers or nectar thieves, performing no pollination while still consuming nectar. Many species are both nectar robbers and pollinators, depending on the plant species they encounter.

Nectar is produced by flowering plants to attract pollinators to visit the flowers and transport pollen between them. Flowers often have specialized structures that make the nectar accessible only for animals possessing appropriate morphological structures, and there are numerous examples of coevolution between nectarivores and the flowers they pollinate. For example, hummingbirds and hawkmoths have long narrow beaks that can reach nectar at the bottom of long tubular flowers.

The majority of nectar feeders are insects or birds, but instances can also be found in other animal groups.

== Insects ==
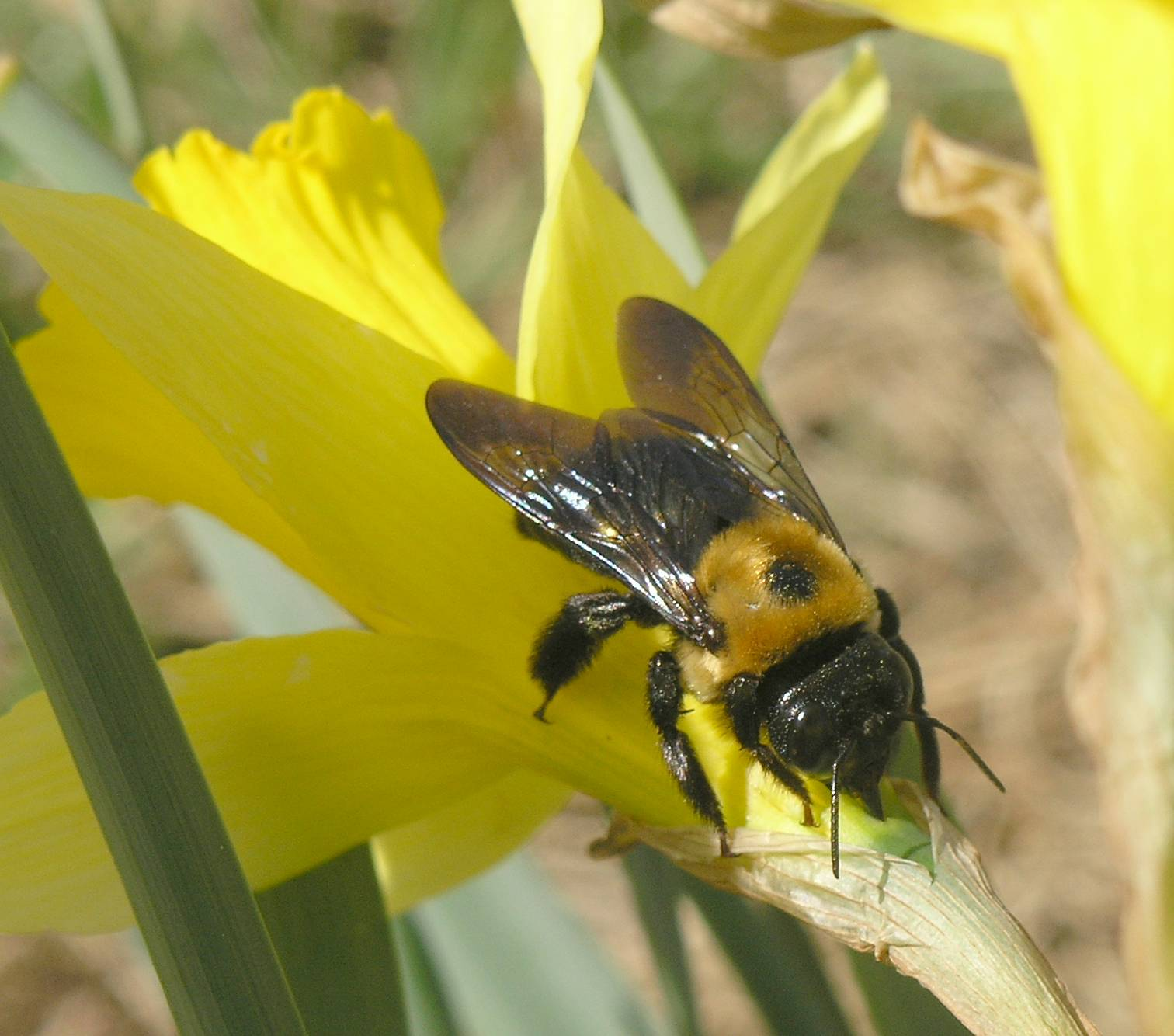
An Eastern carpenter bee (Xylocopa virginica) pierces the corolla to feed from a daffodil (Narcissus sp.)

Nectarivory is extremely common in insects. Key families with large proportions of nectarivores include the Coleoptera, Lepidoptera, Diptera, Hymenoptera and Hemiptera. Some, but not all, are also pollinators: others engage in nectar robbing by avoiding the reproductive organs of plants altogether, particularly those with deep corollas, by piercing into the base of the flower to reach the nectary directly, such as carpenter bees and secondarily honey bees (who consume nectar from holes made by others), as well as ants, who frequently consume nectar and pollen where available despite actively inhibiting germination of pollen at the flowers they visit to the detriment of the plant.

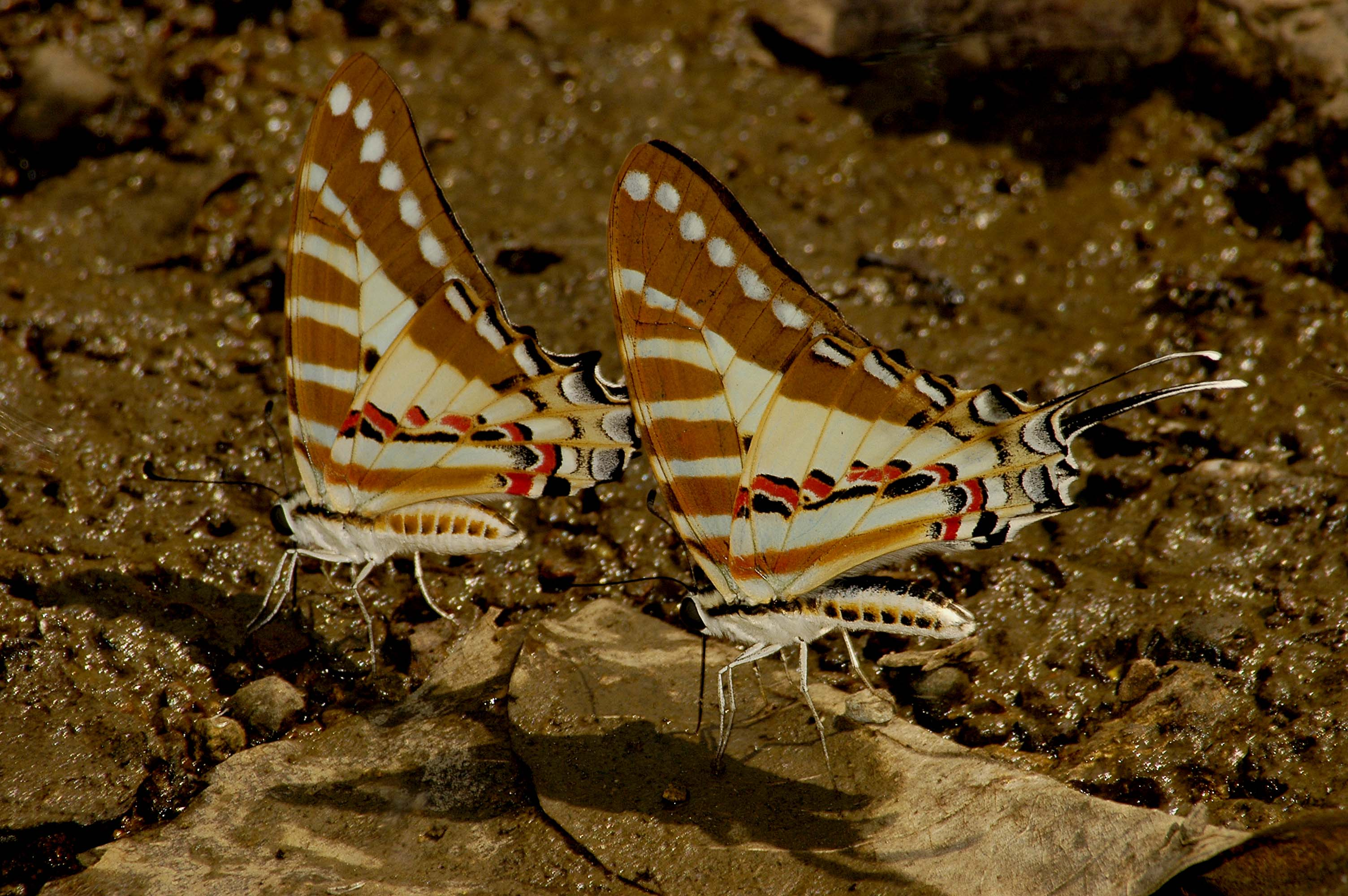
Two Spot swordtail butterflies (Graphium nomius) mud puddling for minerals

Nectar-feeding insects gain enough water from nectar to rarely need to drink, though adult butterflies and moths may engage in puddling in order to obtain dissolved substances not abundant in nectar, particularly salts and amino acids. Some flying nectarivores, particularly larger bees, do not lose enough water by evaporation while on the wing to offset their high intake due to nectar-feeding, as well as water produced metabolically while flying. They must excrete while on the wing to prevent water loading, and may wait at the nest entrance to evaporate off some of their water load before flying out.

== Arachnids ==
There is evidence that some spiders, though normally thought to be exclusively carnivorous, consume nectar indirectly by consuming nectarivorous insects, and/or directly from flowers. This behavior is thought to be more common among spiders that live among foliage. A few make nectar their primary food source, such as Bagheera kiplingi, a member of the jumping spiders, while others such as the crab spiders, feed more rarely and opportunistically. None of the spider groups observed feeding on nectar build webs, they are all wandering species.

== Birds ==
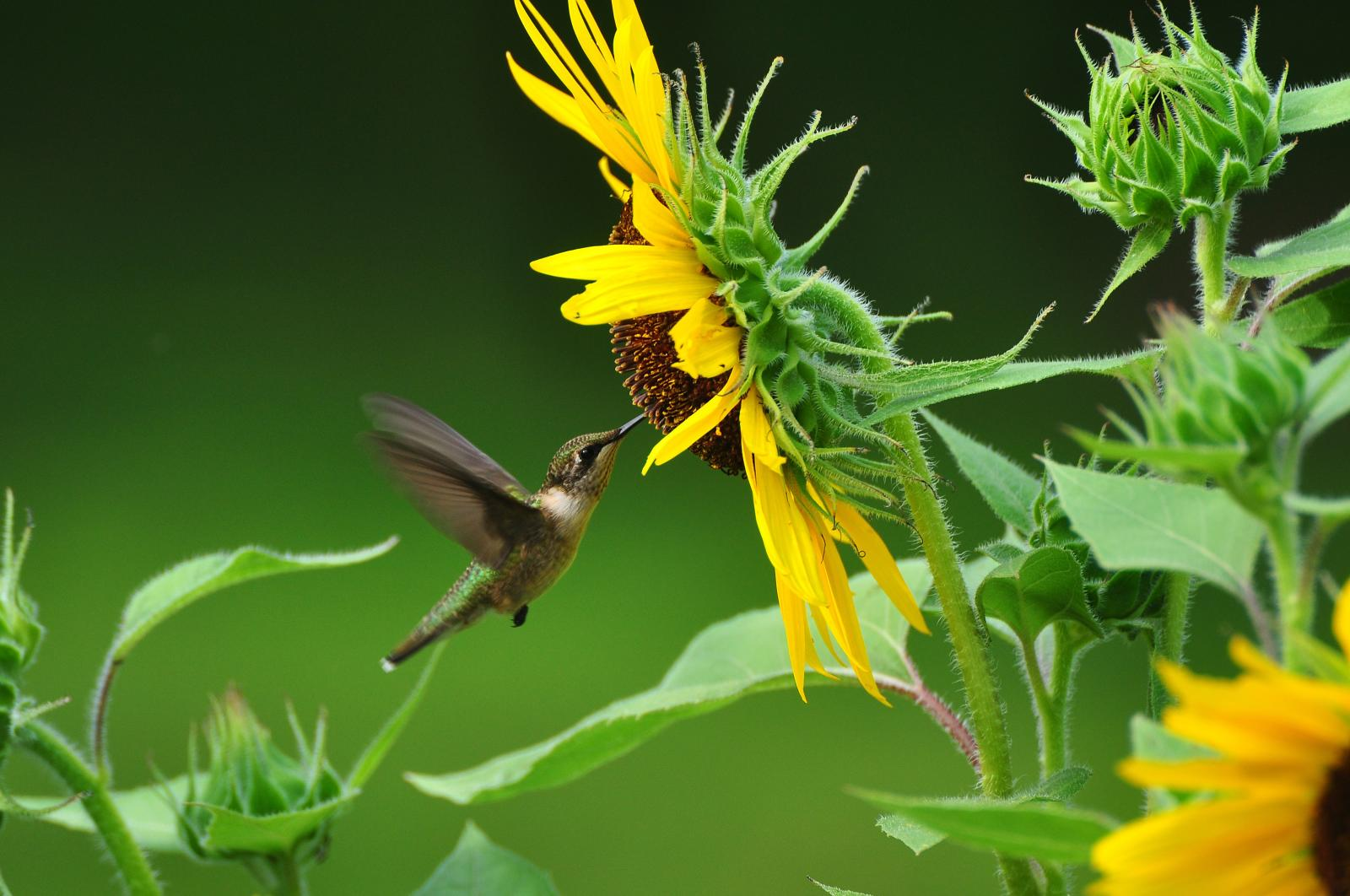
A female ruby-throated hummingbird (Archilochus colubris) feeds on nectar from a sunflower (Helianthus annuus)

Nectar-feeding is widespread among birds, but no species consumes nectar exclusively. Most combine it with insectivory for a mixed diet. Of particular interest are three lineages of specialized nectarivorous birds: the hummingbirds (Trochilidae), sunbirds (Nectariniidae) and honeyeaters (Meliphagidae). These groups have adapted to permit a nectar-central diet, showing higher activity of digestive enzymes which break down sugars, higher rates of absorption of sugars, and altered kidney function. To maintain flight a bird must rapidly excrete much of the water content of the nectar it consumes. A hummingbird's kidneys are capable of rapidly producing large quantities of hyposmotic urine i.e. urine containing a lower concentration of dissolved substances than the blood. Some other bird groups have one or more similar specializations – for instance, Loriini, one group of Australasian parrots within the larger parrot family Psittacidae, possess similar digestive modifications. These are examples of parallel evolution. The Hawaiian honeycreepers have several species adapted to feed on nectar. The Hawaiian tree Metrosideros polymorpha is heavily dependant on the pollination of the more or less nectarivorous honeycreepers.

== Mammals ==
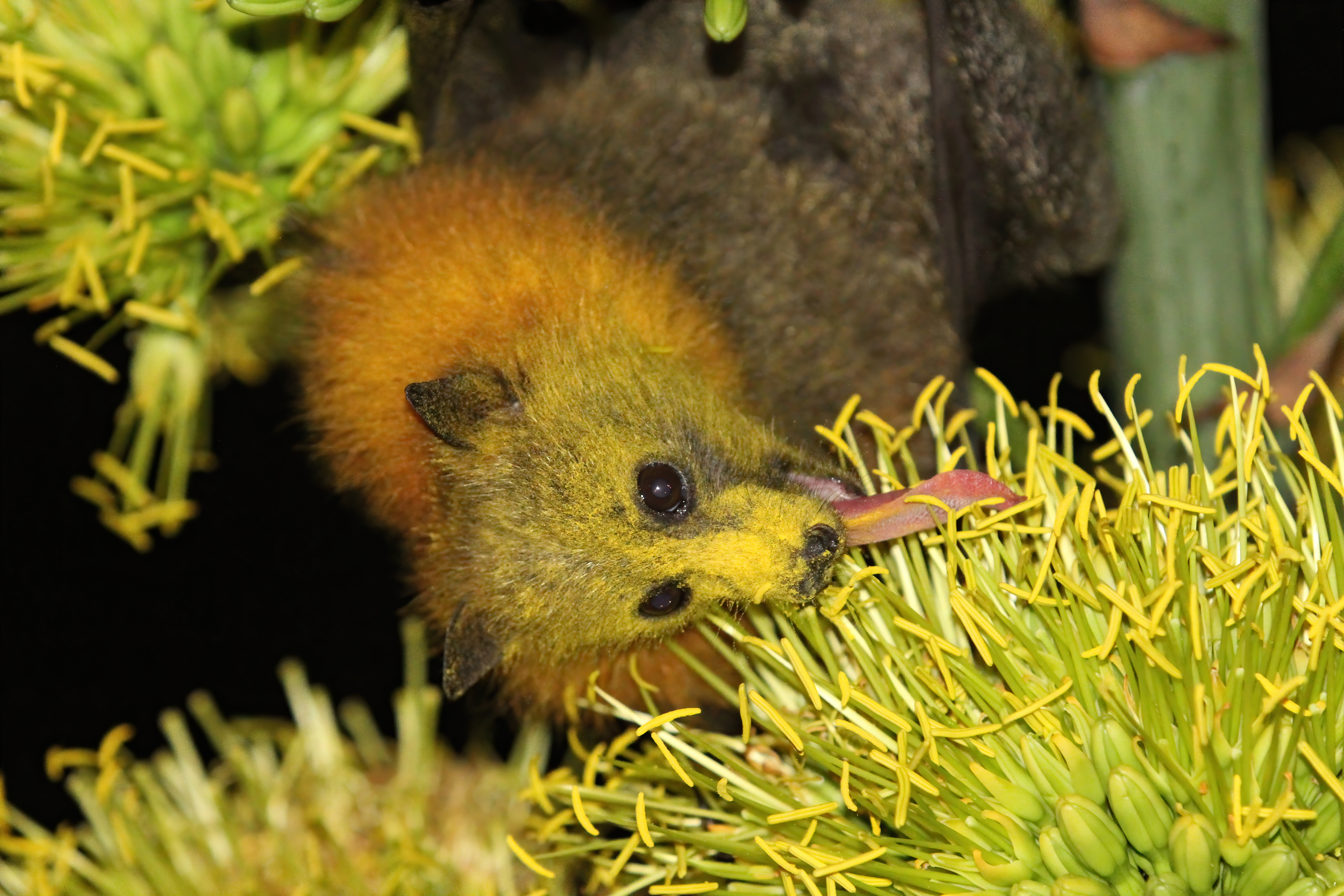
A grey-headed flying fox (Pteropus poliocephalus) feeds on nectar, its face covered with yellow pollen

Many species of bats feed on nectar, their lifestyle similar to that of nectarivorous birds. In the Americas there is significant overlap between flowers pollinated by bats and hummingbirds – both need similarly-composed nectar to keep up energy-intensive hovering flight. In this part of the world there is particularly close association between some species of columnar cacti and bat species, who provide pollination in exchange for nectar with composition matching their nutritional needs. Nectarivorous bats might be at particular risk of extinction due to their reliance on particular species of flowering plants.

A single marsupial species, the honey possum, feeds on nectar and pollen exclusively. It raises fewer young which grow more slowly than other marsupials of its size, because of the time-consuming effort of nectar-drinking from many flowers to support itself. It may spend periods in deep sleep to reduce its need for food, and shows the typical nectarivore adaptations for excess water-removal.

The Ethiopian wolf (Canis simensis) has been observed to feed on the nectar produced by Kniphofia foliosa; they are thought to be the only macropredator known to potentially act as a pollinator.

== See also ==
- Detritivore
- Palynivore
- Frugivore
- Herbivore
