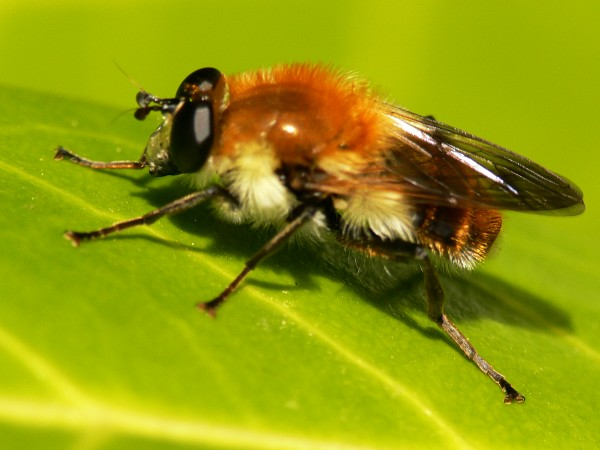
- male
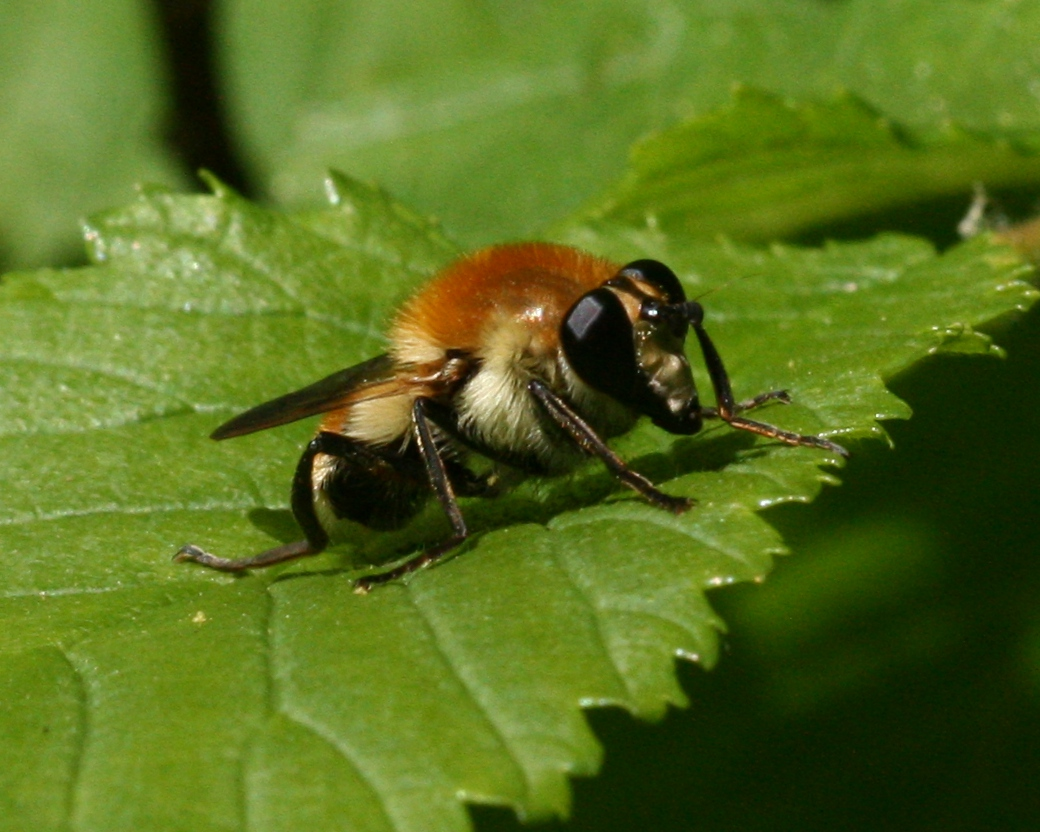
- female

Scientific classification
- Kingdom: Animalia
- Phylum: Arthropoda
- Clade: Pancrustacea
- Class: Insecta
- Order: Diptera
- Family: Syrphidae
- Subfamily: Eristalinae
- Tribe: Milesiini
- Subtribe: Criorhinina
- Genus: Criorhina
- Species: C. floccosa

Binomial name
- Criorhina floccosa (Meigen, 1822)

Synonyms
- Milesia floccosa Meigen, 1822; Syrphus regulus Fallén, 1826

= Criorhina floccosa =

Species of fly

Criorhina floccosa, is a species of hoverfly. It is found in many parts of the Palearctic including Europe.

The larvae of C. floccosa are associated with rotting deciduous wood. Adults are usually found in woodland with overmature trees and are seen visiting flowers to feed.

== Description ==
External images For terms see Morphology of Diptera
A large, broad, bumblebee mimic (wing length 10–13 mm.), densely yellow, fox red or yellow and black pilose. Tergite 2 with distinct side tufts of long yellow hairs. Tergites 3 and 4 with short, dense reddish or tawny pile and dust, not obscuring the ground-colour. Tibia 1 and 2 with pale, adpressed, short hairs. The larva is illustrated by Rotheray (1993)

== Distribution ==
Palaearctic. South Sweden and Denmark South to the Pyrenees from Ireland eastwards to European Russia as far as the Caucasus

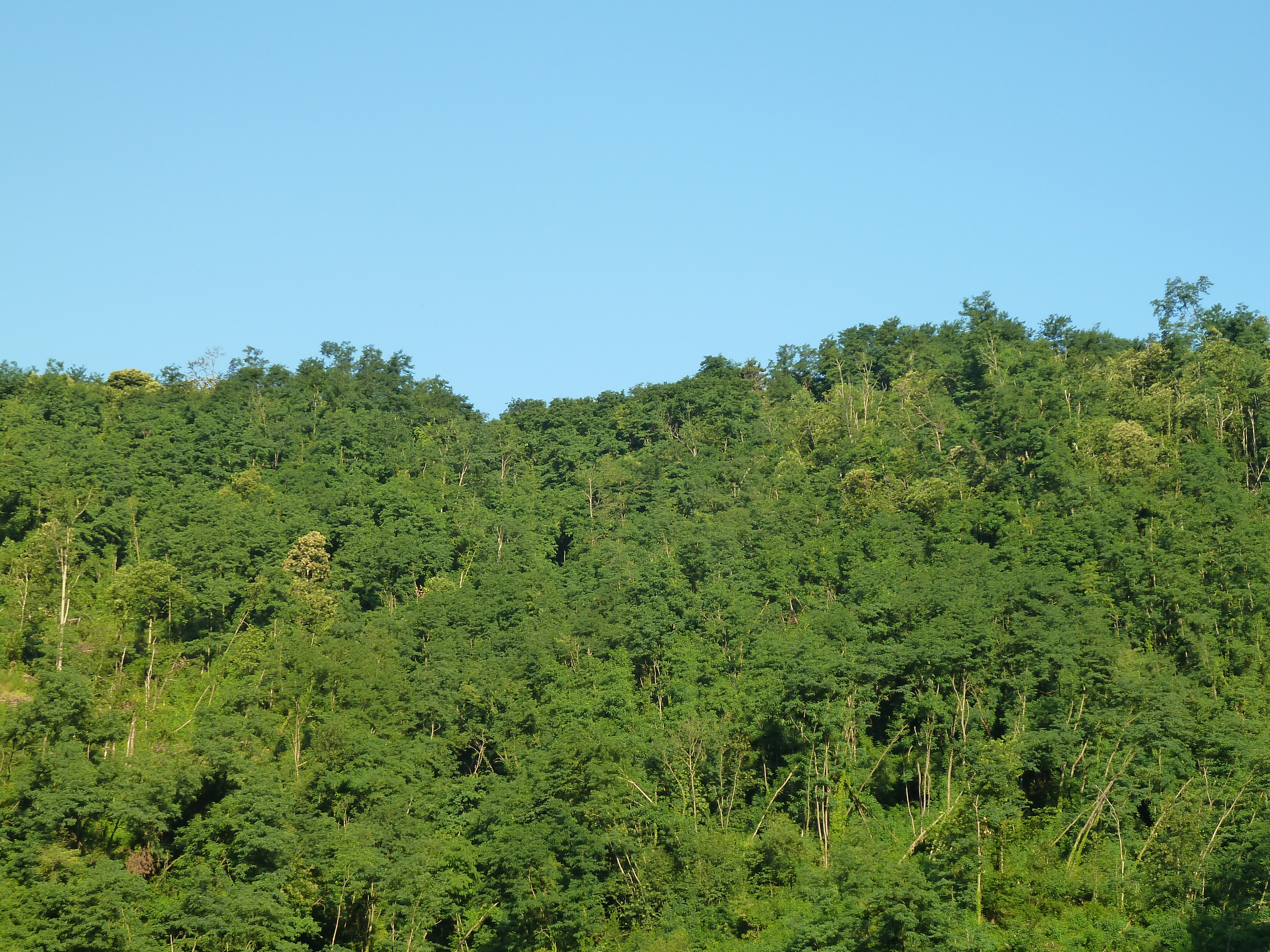
Habitat.Italy

== Biology ==
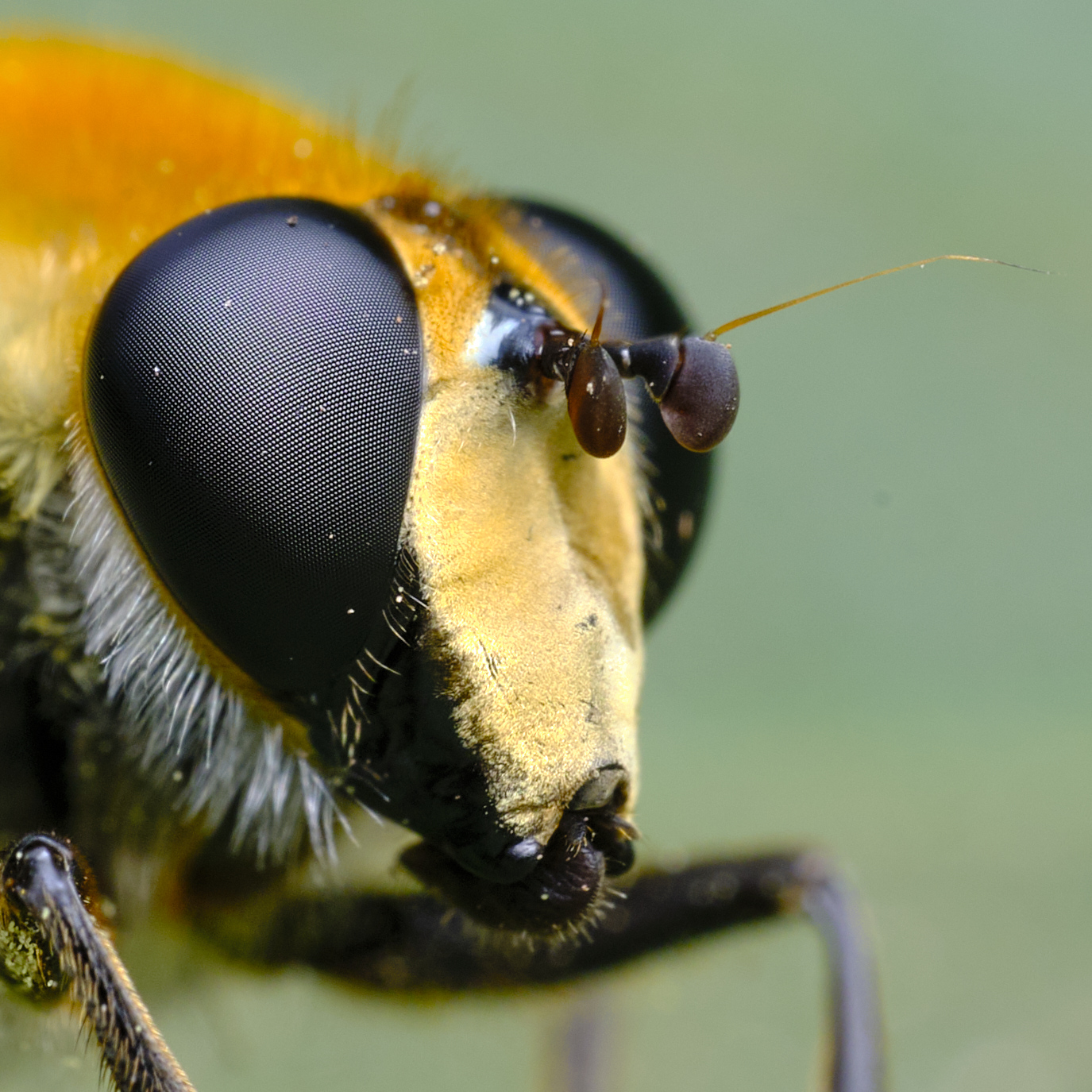
Head

Habitat: Fagus and Quercus ancient woodland with over-mature and senescent trees. Arboreal, but descends to visit flowers of white umbellifers, Cornus sanguinea, Crataegus, Photinia, Prunus spinosa, Ribes alpina, Rubus idaeus, Sorbus aucuparia, Sorbus aria. The flight period is from the beginning of April to the beginning of July.

== See also ==
Other bumblebee mimics are Mallota, Arctophila, Pocota and Brachypalpus. Criorhina differ from these genera in the form of the antennae.
