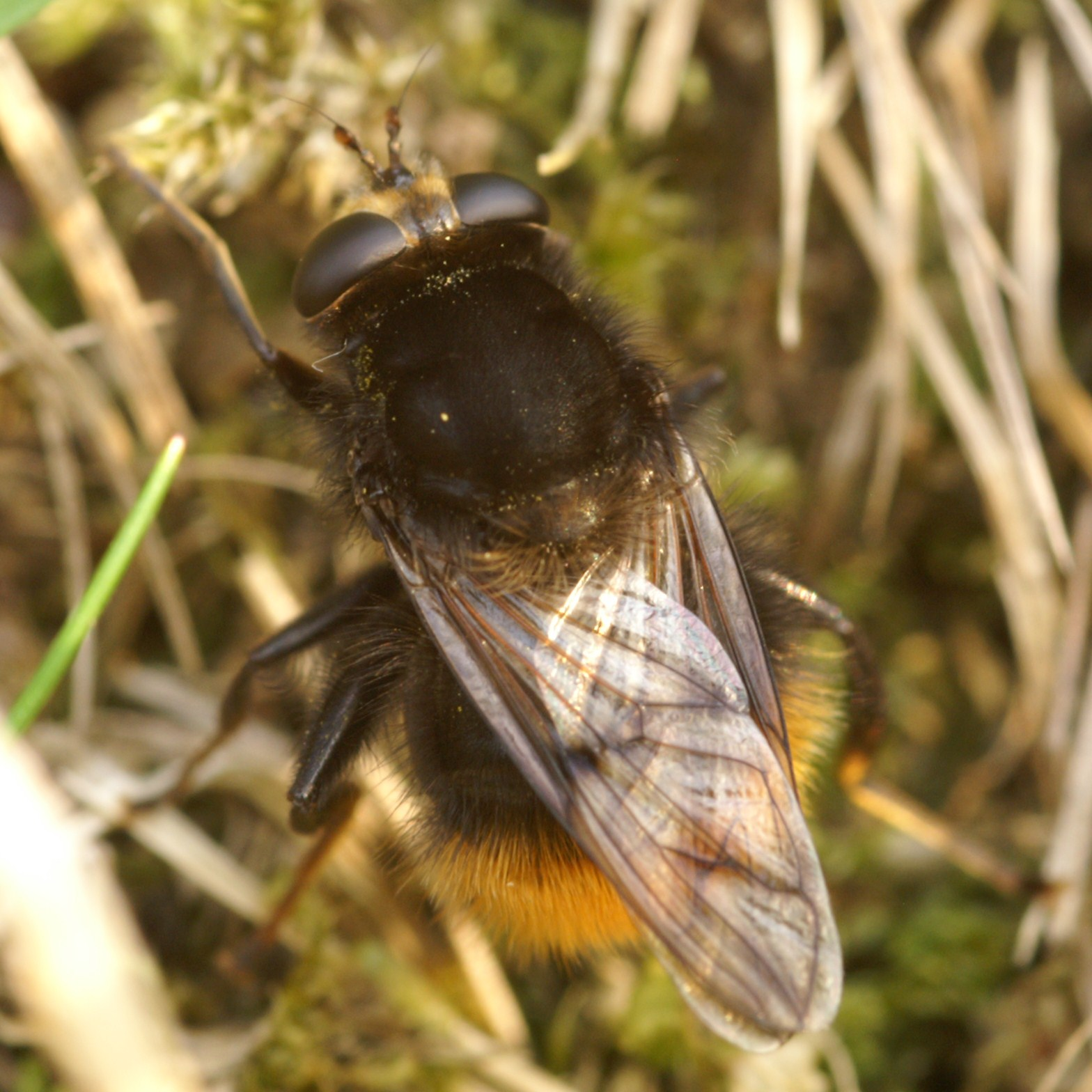

Scientific classification
- Kingdom: Animalia
- Phylum: Arthropoda
- Clade: Pancrustacea
- Class: Insecta
- Order: Diptera
- Family: Syrphidae
- Subfamily: Eristalinae
- Tribe: Milesiini
- Subtribe: Criorhinina
- Genus: Criorhina
- Species: C. ranunculi

Binomial name
- Criorhina ranunculi (Panzer, 1803)

Synonyms
- Criorhina flavicauda Macquart, 1829; Criorhyna picciolii Rondani, 1865; Criorrhina hispanica Gil Collado, 1930; Syrphus ranunculi Panzer, 1803; Xylota haemorrhoidalis Wiedemann, 1822

= Criorhina ranunculi =

Species of fly

Criorhina ranunculi, is a species of hoverfly found in the spring in many parts of Britain and Europe.

The larvae of C. ranunculi are associated with rotting deciduous wood. (Note: Despite the specific name, the species has no special association with Ranunculus buttercups.) Adults are remarkable bumblebee mimics and are usually found in woodland in springtime visiting flowers such as sallow to feed.

== Description ==
For terms see Morphology of Diptera
Large (wing length 11·25–14 mm.) bumblebee mimic. Thorax and abdomen with long, dense hairs. Hairs black on thorax and basal part of abdomen red or yellowish on tip of abdomen. Scutellar hairs may be pale yellow or brownish. Hind femora considerably thickened, especially in males. Hind tibiae sickle-shaped.

== Distribution ==
It has a Palaearctic distribution, including southern Norway and Sweden south to central Spain, and from Ireland eastwards through central Europe into European parts of Russia.

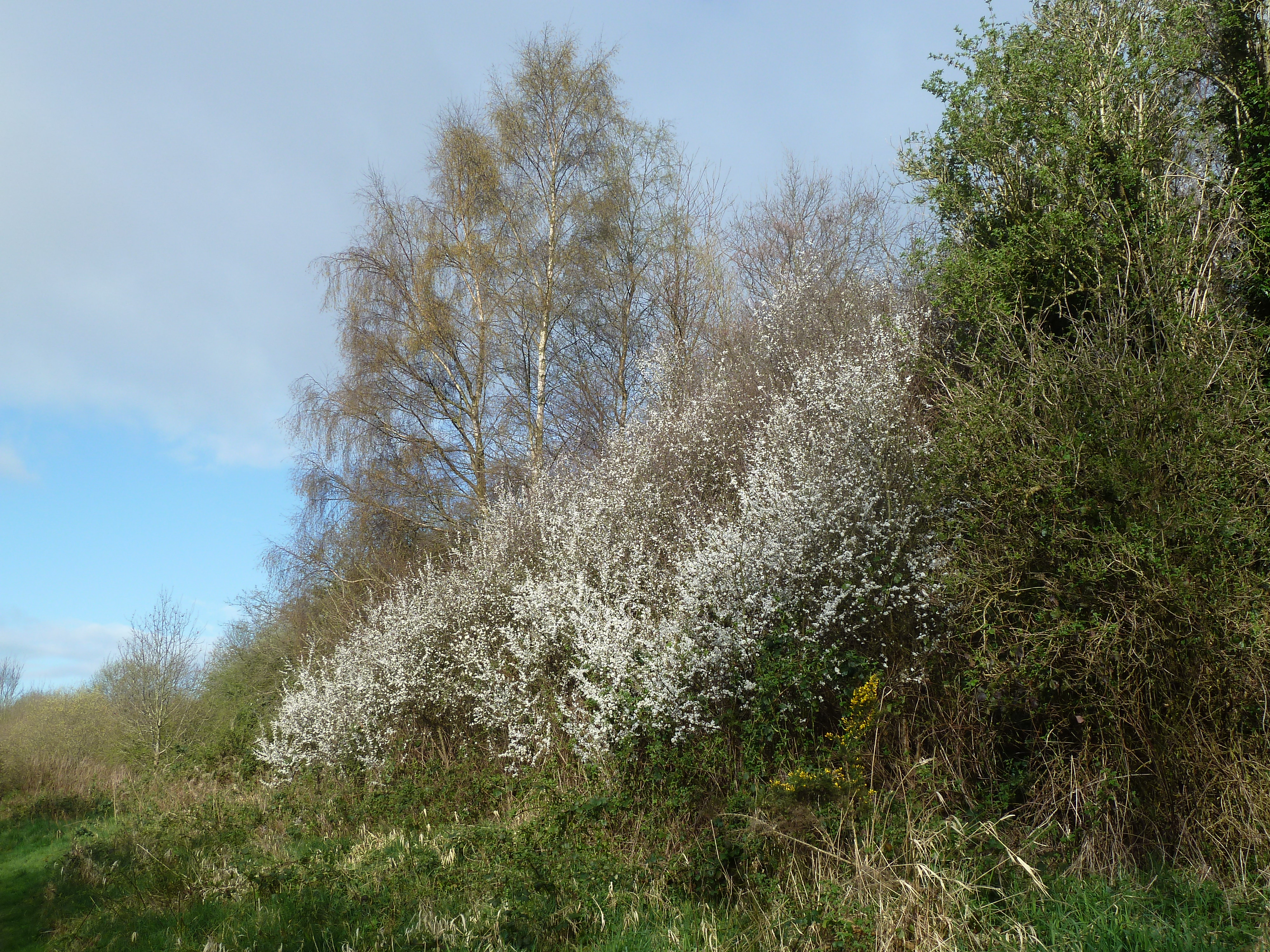
Habitat.Ireland.

== Biology ==
Habitat includes: Betula, Fagus, and Quercus forest. Adults are primarily arboreal, but descend to visit flowering shrubs in sun-lit glades. These flies are extremely fast, with a high-pitched whine, zig-zagging between the branches of flowering trees. Flowers visited include Cardamine pratensis, Cornus sanguinea, Crataegus, Photinia, Prunus cerasus, Prunus spinosa, Rubus, Salix, and Sorbus aucuparia. The flight period is from the beginning of March to mid May (later at higher altitudes).

== See also ==
Other bumblebee mimics are Mallota, Arctophila, Merodon, Pocota and Brachypalpus. Criorhina differ from these genera in the form of the antennae.
