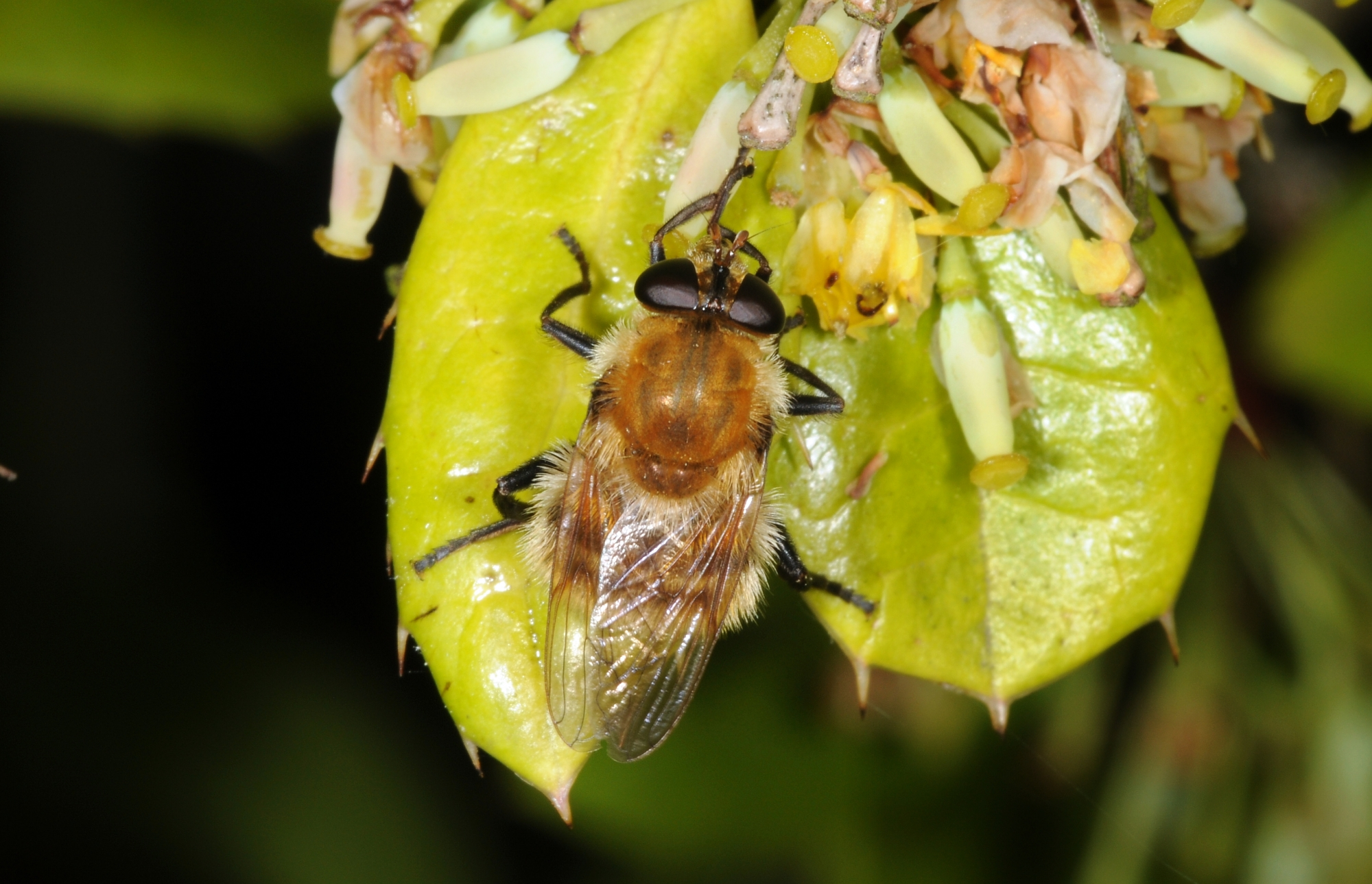
- Criorhina berberina oxyacanthae female

Scientific classification
- Kingdom: Animalia
- Phylum: Arthropoda
- Clade: Pancrustacea
- Class: Insecta
- Order: Diptera
- Family: Syrphidae
- Subfamily: Eristalinae
- Tribe: Milesiini
- Subtribe: Criorhinina
- Genus: Criorhina
- Species: C. berberina

Binomial name
- Criorhina berberina (Fabricius, 1805)

Synonyms
- Criorhina oxyacanthae (Meigen, 1822); Eristalis berberinus Fabricius, 1805; Milesia oxyacanthae Meigen, 1822; Criorhina graeca Schirmer, 1913; Criorhina bombiformis Perris, 1839; Criorhina brebissonii Macquart, 1829

= Criorhina berberina =

Species of fly

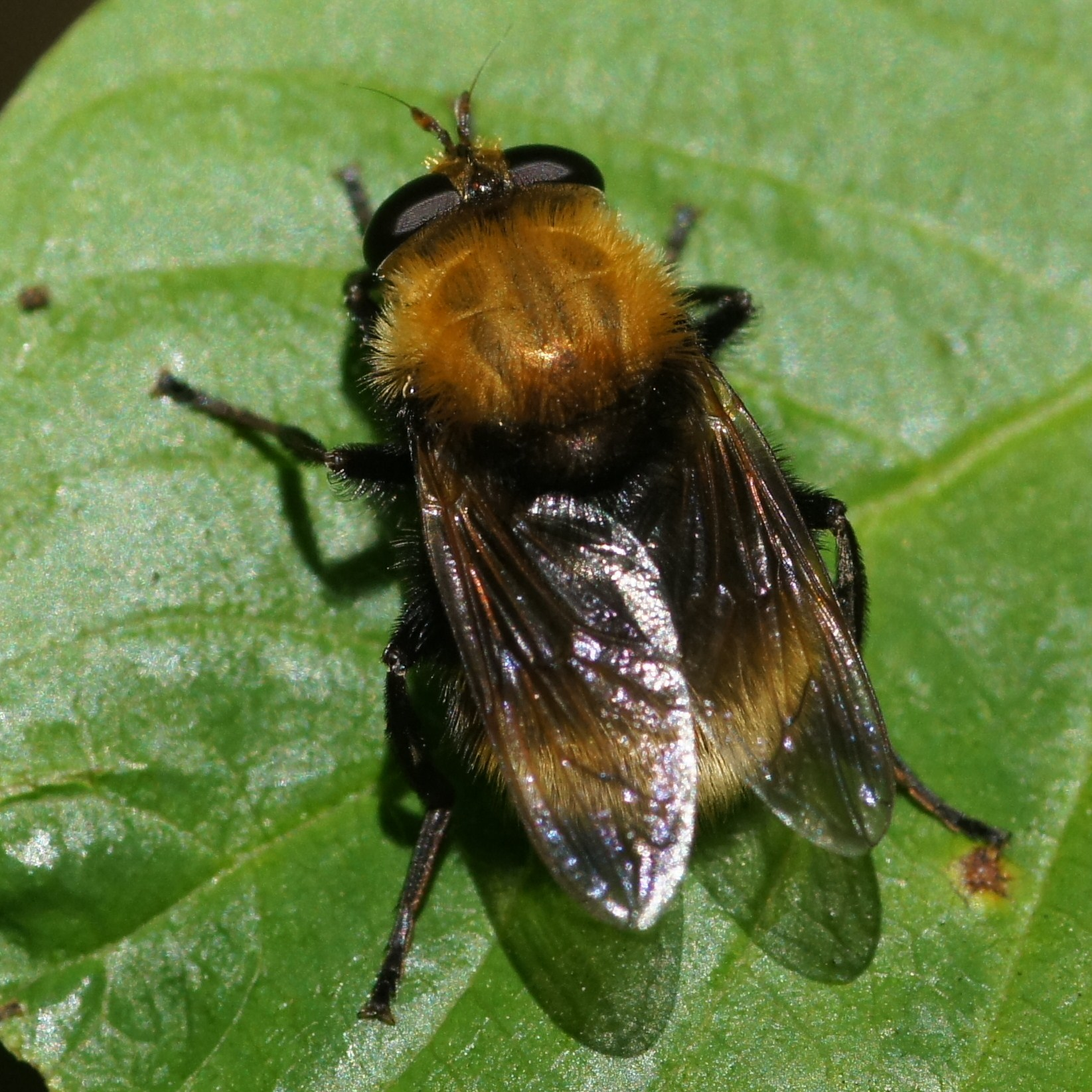
Criorhina berberina

Criorhina berberina is a species of hoverfly. It is found in the Palaearctic from Fennoscandia South to Iberia and Italy. Ireland eastwards through Europe into Turkey and European Russia . C. berberina is a bumblebee mimic. The body has uniformly long dense pubescence, obscuring the ground-colour. There are two forms one with the pubescence more or less extensively blackish (typical berberina), one in which it is entirely yellow or tawny (berberina var. oxyacanthae Meigen). Criorhina differ from other bumblebee mimics - Mallota, Arctophila, Pocota and Brachypalpus by the form of their antennae: the first segments are thin and form a stalk, the third segment is shorter than it is wide. In Criorhina, the face projects downwards, in contrast to Pocota and Brachypalpus.

Larvae of C. berberina are associated with rotting deciduous wood. The larva is figured by Hartley (1961) and Rotheray (1993) Adults are arboreal and found in most categories of both coniferous and deciduous forest with overmature trees and are seen visiting flowers to feed. These include white umbellifers, Allium ursinum, Cornus sanguinea, Crataegus, Euonymus, Filipendula, Frangula alnus, Hypericum, Lonicera xylosteum, Photinia, Ranunculus, Rhamnus catharticus, Rhododendron, Rosa, Rubus idaeus, Salix, Sorbus, Taraxacum and Viburnum opulus. The flight period is May to July . C. berberina is a bioindicator.
