= C. grandis =

C. grandis may refer to:

- Calomyscus grandis, the noble calomyscus, a mouse-like hamster species from Iran
- Calyptranthes grandis, a flowering plant species in the genus Calyptranthes
- Camarasaurus grandis, a dinosaur species
- Cantuaria grandis, a spider species in the genus Cantuaria found in New Zealand
- Capparis grandis, a flowering plant species in the genus Capparis
- Cassia grandis, the pink shower cassia, a plant species
- Cattleya grandis, the large laelia, an orchid species in the genus Cattleya found in Brazil
- Cephenemyia grandis, a botfly species in the genus Cephenemyia
- Chionodes grandis, a moth species in the genus Chionodes
- Chrysichthys grandis, the kukumai, a fish species found in Africa
- Chrysopilus grandis, a snipe fly species in the genus Chrysopilus
- Citrus grandis, the pomelo, a fruit plant native to Southeast Asia
- Clidicus grandis, a rove beetle species in the genus Clidicus
- Coccinia grandis, the ivy gourd, a tropical vine species
- Copablepharon grandis, the pale yellow dune moth, a moth species found in North America
- Coryphagrion grandis, a damselfly species found in Kenya, Tanzania and Mozambique
- Cricosaurus grandis, an extinct marine crocodyliform species from the Late Jurassic of England, France, Switzerland, Germany, Argentina, Cuba and Mexico
- Criorhina grandis, a hoverfly species in the genus Criorhina
- Crocidura grandis, the greater Mindanao shrew, a mammal species endemic to the Philippines
- Crossodactylus grandis, a frog species endemic to Brazil
- Cryptocarya grandis, the cinnamon laurel, a plant species in the genus Cryptocarya found in Australia
- Cymbospondylus grandis, a basal early ichthyosaur species from the middle and later years of the Triassic period found in Germany and Nevada

== See also ==
- Grandis (disambiguation)
