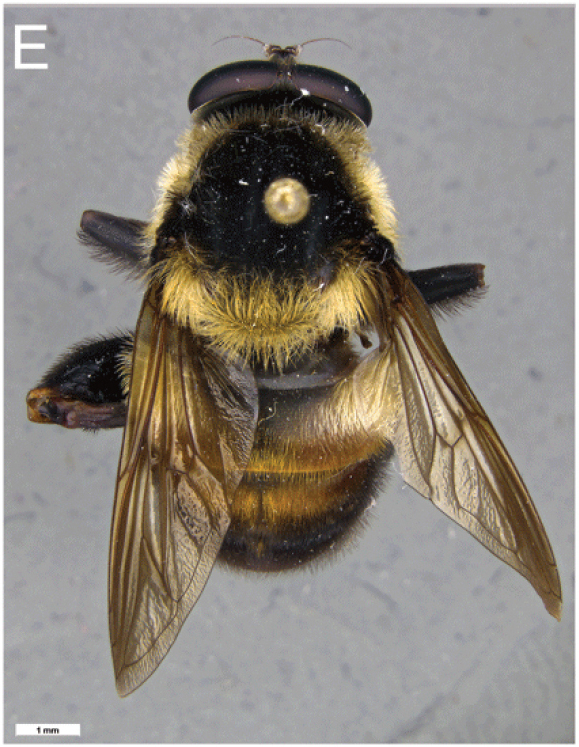

Scientific classification
- Kingdom: Animalia
- Phylum: Arthropoda
- Class: Insecta
- Order: Diptera
- Family: Syrphidae
- Genus: Romaleosyrphus
- Species: R. villosus

Binomial name
- Romaleosyrphus villosus Bigot, 1882

= Romaleosyrphus villosus =

Species of fly

Romaleosyrphus villosus is a species of hover fly from Central America. It was described by Jacques Marie François Bigot in 1882 in reference to a specimen from Mexico.

A related species described from the United States by the same author in 1879, Criorhina villosa, has been confused with this species, since at one point they had the same name, both being placed in the genus Criorhina. In 2021, R. villosus was moved back into Romaleosyrphus, resolving the issue of homonymy (by ICZN Art. 59.2).
