= Pocota bomboides =

Scientific classification
- Kingdom: Animalia
- Phylum: Arthropoda
- Class: Insecta
- Order: Diptera
- Family: Syrphidae
- Subfamily: Eristalinae
- Tribe: Milesiini
- Subtribe: Xylotina
- Genus: Pocota
- Species: P. bomboides

Binomial name
- Pocota bomboides Hunter, 1897

Species of fly

Pocota bomboides is a species of syrphid fly in the family Syrphidae.

== Distribution ==
Canada, United States.
