= Criorhina takaoensis =

Scientific classification
- Kingdom: Animalia
- Phylum: Arthropoda
- Clade: Pancrustacea
- Class: Insecta
- Order: Diptera
- Family: Syrphidae
- Subfamily: Eristalinae
- Tribe: Milesiini
- Subtribe: Criorhinina
- Genus: Criorhina
- Species: C. takaoensis

Binomial name
- Criorhina takaoensis (Shiraki, 1952)

Synonyms
- Penthesilea takaoensis Shiraki, 1952

Species of fly

Criorhina takaoensis is a species of hoverfly in the family Syrphidae.

== Distribution ==
Japan.
