= Brachypalpus zugmayeriae =

Scientific classification
- Kingdom: Animalia
- Phylum: Arthropoda
- Class: Insecta
- Order: Diptera
- Family: Syrphidae
- Tribe: Milesiini
- Subtribe: Xylotina
- Genus: Brachypalpus
- Species: B. zugmayeriae

Binomial name
- Brachypalpus zugmayeriae Mik, 1887

Species of fly

Brachypalpus zugmayeriae is a species of hoverfly in the family Syrphidae.

== Distribution ==
Caucasus.
