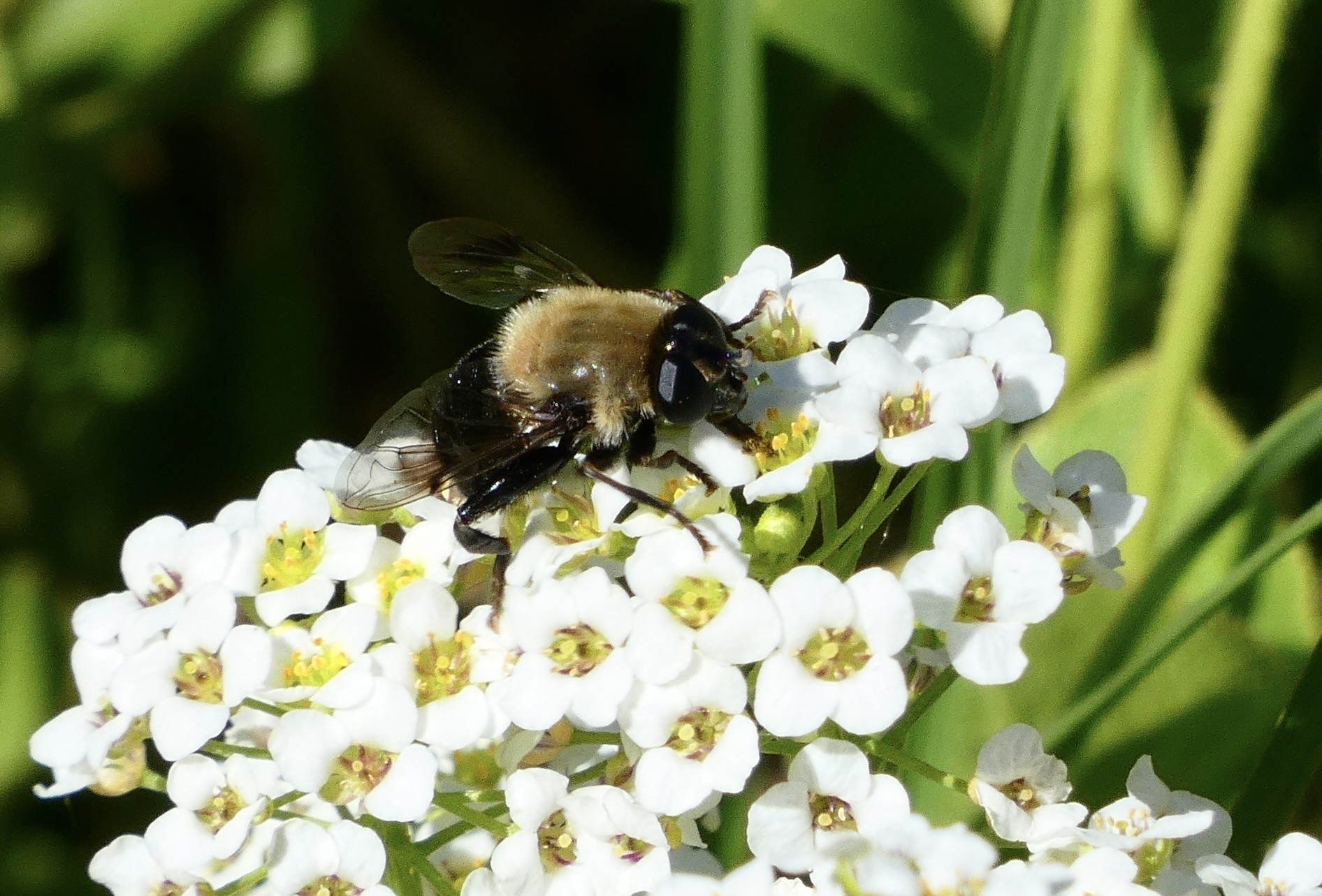

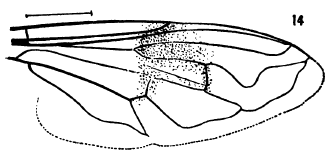

Scientific classification
- Kingdom: Animalia
- Phylum: Arthropoda
- Class: Insecta
- Order: Diptera
- Family: Syrphidae
- Genus: Mallota
- Species: M. sackeni

Binomial name
- Mallota sackeni Williston, 1882

Synonyms
- Mallota columbiae Curran, 1922

= Mallota sackeni =

Species of fly

Mallota sackeni, also known as the brown-haltered mimic fly, is a species of syrphid fly in the family Syrphidae. It is found in western North America, from British Columbia to southern California, and as far east as Idaho–Utah.
