= Criorhina excavata =

Scientific classification
- Kingdom: Animalia
- Phylum: Arthropoda
- Clade: Pancrustacea
- Class: Insecta
- Order: Diptera
- Family: Syrphidae
- Subfamily: Eristalinae
- Tribe: Milesiini
- Subtribe: Criorhinina
- Genus: Criorhina
- Species: C. excavata

Binomial name
- Criorhina excavata Curran, 1929

Species of fly

Criorhina excavata is a species of hoverfly in the family Syrphidae.

== Distribution ==
India.
