= Brachypalpus alopex =

Bumblebee catkin fly

Scientific classification
- Kingdom: Animalia
- Phylum: Arthropoda
- Class: Insecta
- Order: Diptera
- Family: Syrphidae
- Tribe: Milesiini
- Subtribe: Xylotina
- Genus: Brachypalpus
- Species: B. alopex

Binomial name
- Brachypalpus alopex (Osten Sacken, 1877)

Synonyms
- Pocota alopex Osten Sacken, 1877

Species of fly

Brachypalpus alopex, the bumblebee catkin fly, is an uncommon species of syrphid fly first officially described by Osten Sacken in 1877. Hoverflies get their names from the ability to remain nearly motionless while in flight. The adults are also known as flower flies, for they are commonly found around and on flowers from which they get both energy-giving nectar and protein-rich pollen. The larvae are of the rat-tailed type feeding on decaying sap under tree bark.

== Distribution ==
This Nearctic species has been found along the coast in Western North America.

External map
