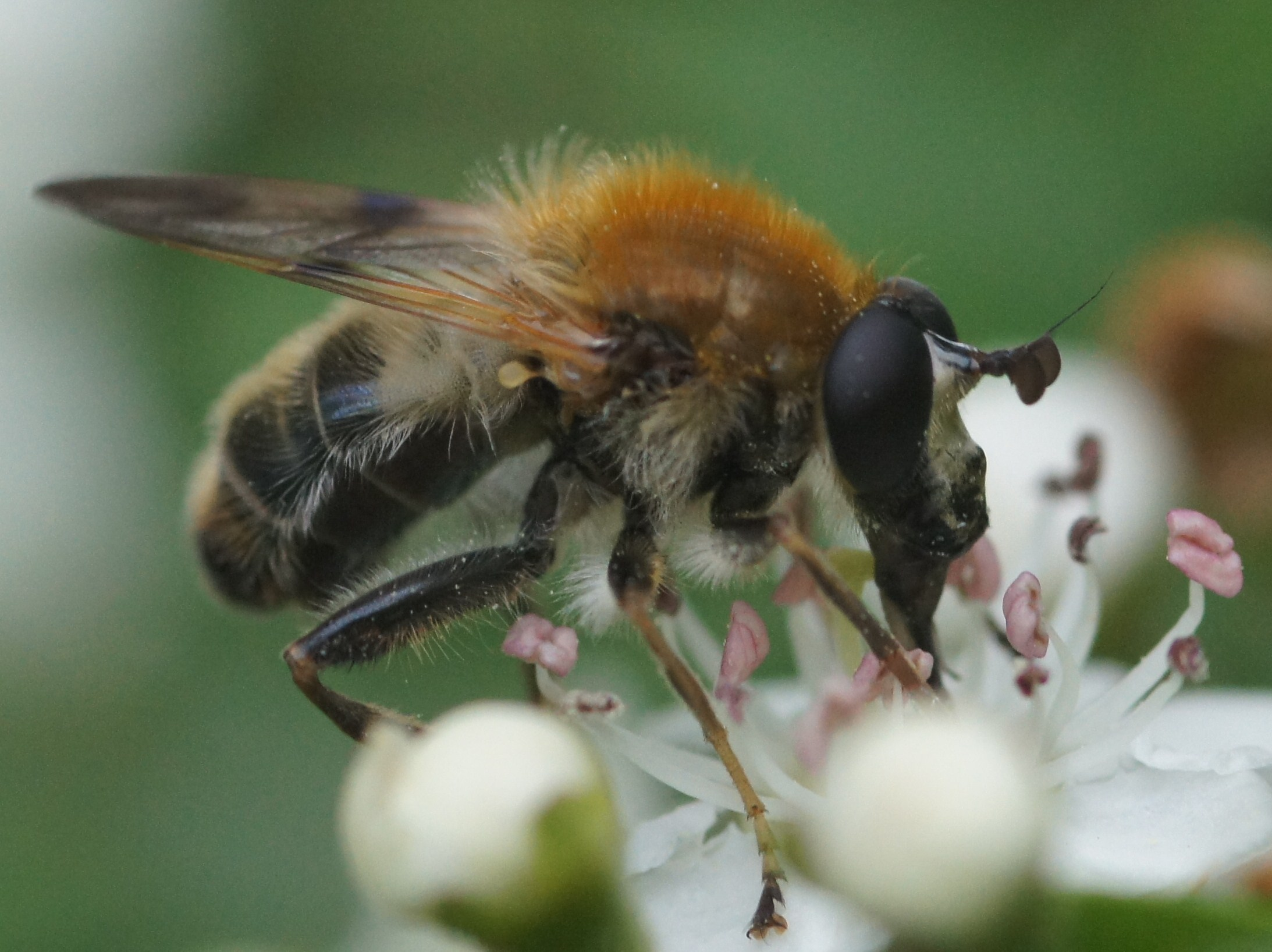
- male

Scientific classification
- Kingdom: Animalia
- Phylum: Arthropoda
- Clade: Pancrustacea
- Class: Insecta
- Order: Diptera
- Family: Syrphidae
- Subfamily: Eristalinae
- Tribe: Milesiini
- Subtribe: Criorhinina
- Genus: Criorhina
- Species: C. asilica

Binomial name
- Criorhina asilica (Fallén, 1816)

Synonyms
- Syrphus asilicus Fallén, 1816; Xylota rufipila Wiedemann, 1822

= Criorhina asilica =

Species of fly

Criorhina asilica, is a species of hoverfly. It is found in many parts of Britain and Europe.

The larvae of C. asilica are associated with rotting deciduous wood in mature woodland and fens. Adults are Honey Bee mimics and can be found in spring visiting hawthorn flowers.
