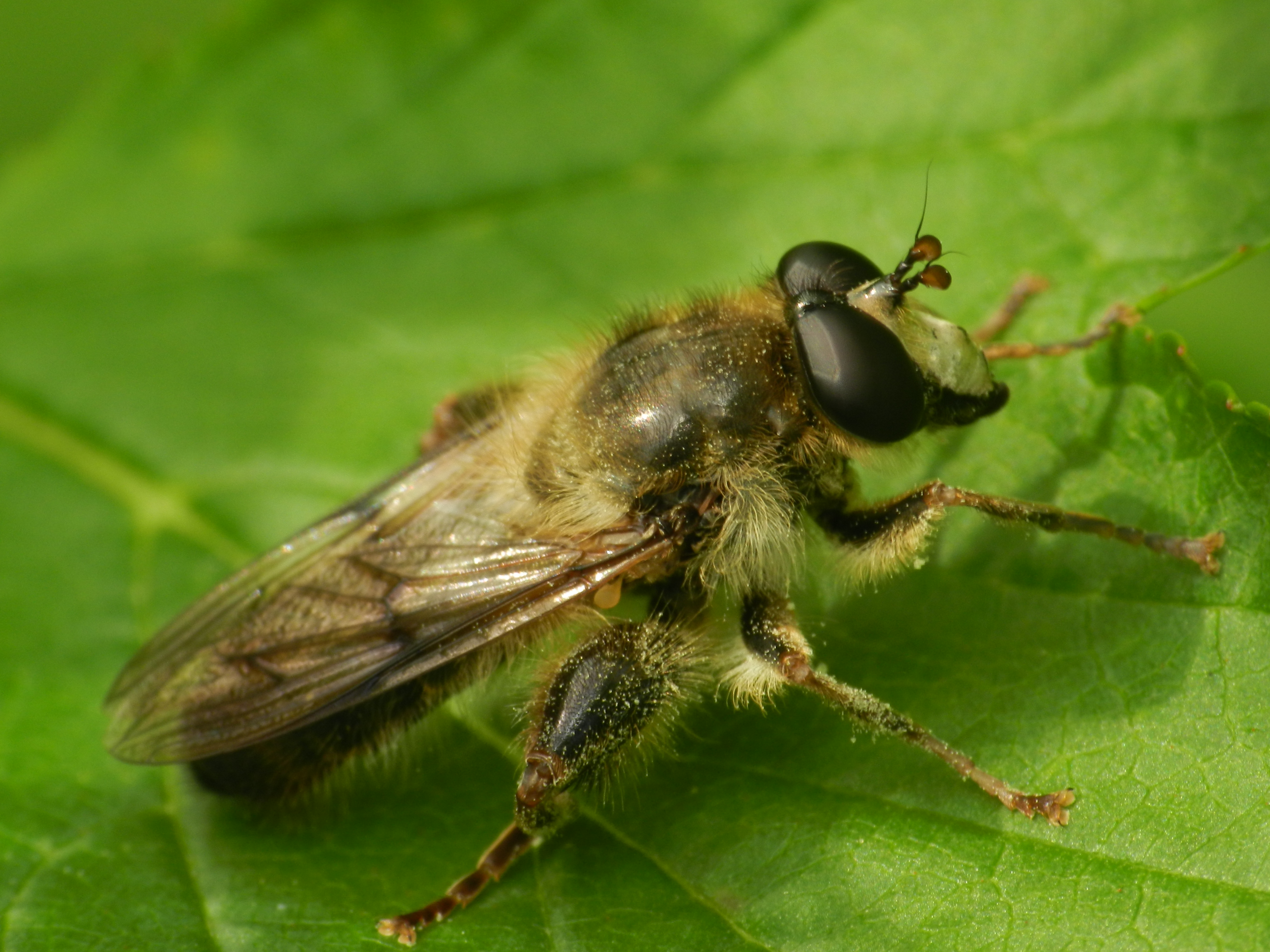

Scientific classification
- Kingdom: Animalia
- Phylum: Arthropoda
- Clade: Pancrustacea
- Class: Insecta
- Order: Diptera
- Family: Syrphidae
- Subfamily: Eristalinae
- Tribe: Milesiini
- Subtribe: Criorhinina
- Genus: Criorhina
- Species: C. pachymera

Binomial name
- Criorhina pachymera (Egger, 1858)

Synonyms
- Criorhina apiformis Macquart, 1829; Milesia pachymera Egger, 1858

= Criorhina pachymera =

Species of fly

Criorhina pachymera is a species of hoverfly in the family Syrphidae.

== Distribution ==
The species can be seen in Austria and Belgium.
