= Brachypalpus olivaceus =

Scientific classification
- Kingdom: Animalia
- Phylum: Arthropoda
- Class: Insecta
- Order: Diptera
- Family: Syrphidae
- Tribe: Milesiini
- Subtribe: Xylotina
- Genus: Brachypalpus
- Species: B. olivaceus

Binomial name
- Brachypalpus olivaceus Meigen, 1822

Synonyms
- Xylota olivaceus Meigen, 1822; Musca longipes Thunberg, 1791

Species of fly

Brachypalpus olivaceus is a species of hoverfly in the family Syrphidae.

== Distribution ==
Germany.
