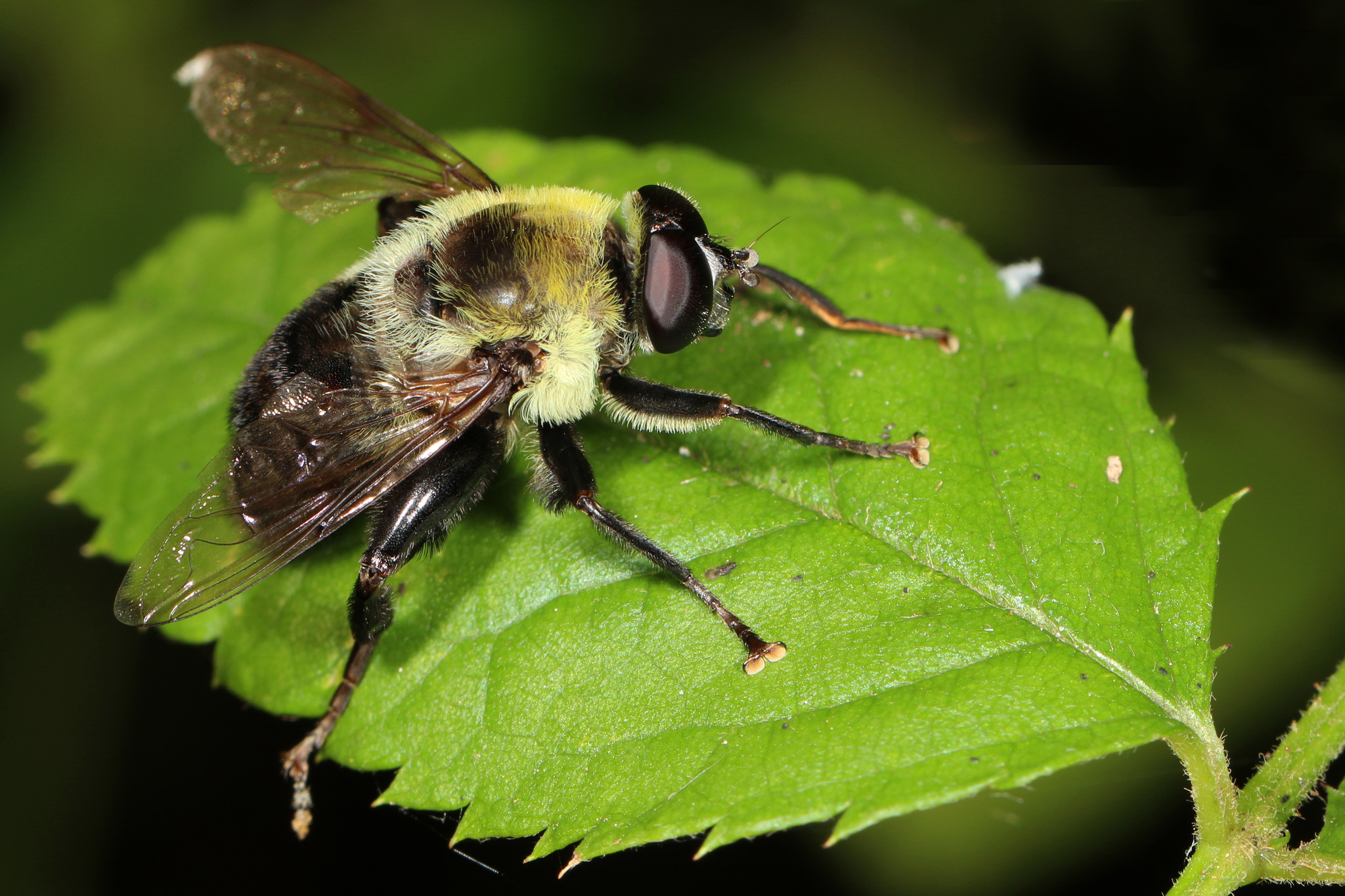

Scientific classification
- Domain: Eukaryota
- Kingdom: Animalia
- Phylum: Arthropoda
- Class: Insecta
- Order: Diptera
- Family: Syrphidae
- Genus: Mallota
- Species: M. posticata

Binomial name
- Mallota posticata (Fabricius, 1805)

Synonyms
- Eristalis coactus Wiedemann, 1830; Eristalis posticata Fabricius, 1805; Mallota separata Hull, 1945; Merodon balanus Walker, 1849; Milesia barda LeConte, 1859

= Mallota posticata =

Species of fly

Mallota posticata is a species of syrphid fly in the family Syrphidae.
