= Brachypalpus nigrifacies =

Scientific classification
- Kingdom: Animalia
- Phylum: Arthropoda
- Class: Insecta
- Order: Diptera
- Family: Syrphidae
- Tribe: Milesiini
- Subtribe: Xylotina
- Genus: Brachypalpus
- Species: B. nigrifacies

Binomial name
- Brachypalpus nigrifacies Stackelberg, 1965

Species of fly

Brachypalpus nigrifacies is a species of hoverfly in the family Syrphidae.

== Distribution ==
Russia.
