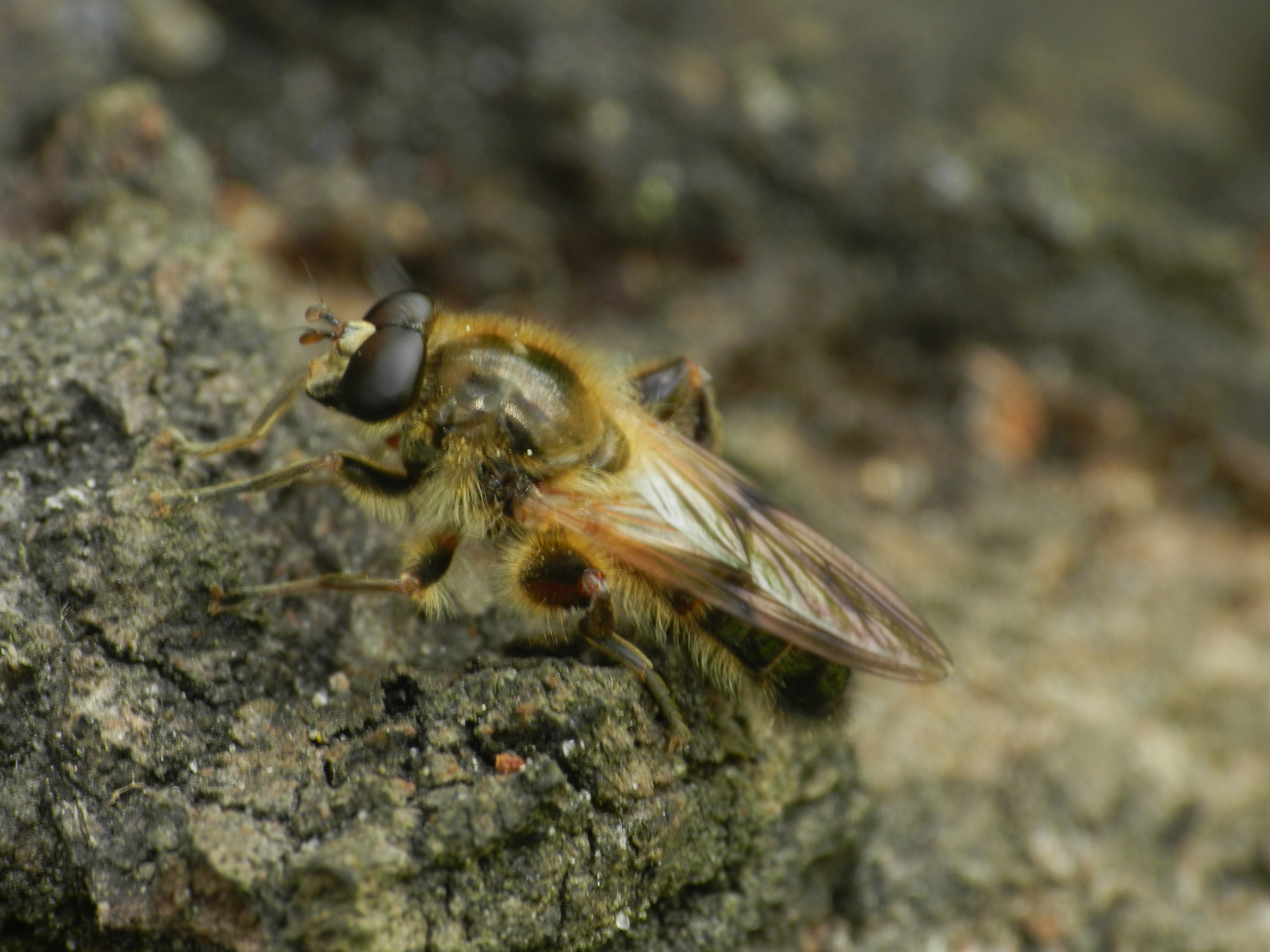
- Brachypalpus valgus Olsztyn, Poland

Scientific classification
- Kingdom: Animalia
- Phylum: Arthropoda
- Class: Insecta
- Order: Diptera
- Family: Syrphidae
- Subfamily: Eristalinae
- Tribe: Milesiini
- Subtribe: Xylotina
- Genus: Brachypalpus
- Species: B. valgus

Binomial name
- Brachypalpus valgus Panzer, 1798

Synonyms
- Syrphus valgus Panzer, 1798; Syrphus laphriformis (Fallén, 1816); Brachypalpus bimaculatus (Macquart, 1829); Brachypalpus tuberculatus Macquart, 1834; Xylota laphriaeformis Walker, 1849; Brachypalpus angustatus Schiner, 1860; Brachypalpus angustus Egger, 1860; Brachypalpus meigenii Schiner, 1857; Eristalis susurrans Gravenhorst, 1807; Spilomyia femoratus Stephens, 1846; Xylota bimaculata Macquart, 1829

= Brachypalpus valgus =

Species of fly

Brachypalpus valgus is a species of hoverfly found in Europe.

== Description ==
External images Brachypalpus are medium-sized (wing length 8.5-10.75 mm.) blackish flies with clouded wings. In Brachypalpus valgus the thorax and scutellum are unstriped and aeneous black. The abdominal tergites are shining black with red lateral colour at base of abdomen. Hairs on the body surface are sand brown. Hind trochanters with a posterior process. Hind tibiae slightly curved. The larva is illustrated by Rotheray (1993).

== Mimicry ==
Superficially resembles a honey bee.

== Distribution ==
Brachypalpus valgus is a Palearctic species with a limited distribution in Europe South Fennoscandia to the Pyrenees then Ireland east through central Europe and northern Italy to Yugoslavia and European parts of Russia.

== Biology ==
Occurs in wooded areas (over-mature Fagus and Quercus forest with senile trees and fallen, rotting timber) where it is a bioindicator. The "short-tailed" larvae have been found in the rotten wood of trees, and under the bark. Males have a rapid, zigzag flight over the trunks of fallen tree. They fly with a high-pitched buzz. The female can be found investigating fallen trees. Both sexes visit the flowers of umbellifers, Berberis, Crataegus, Photinia, Prunus and Sorbus.

The flight period is from the end May to the end of June.
