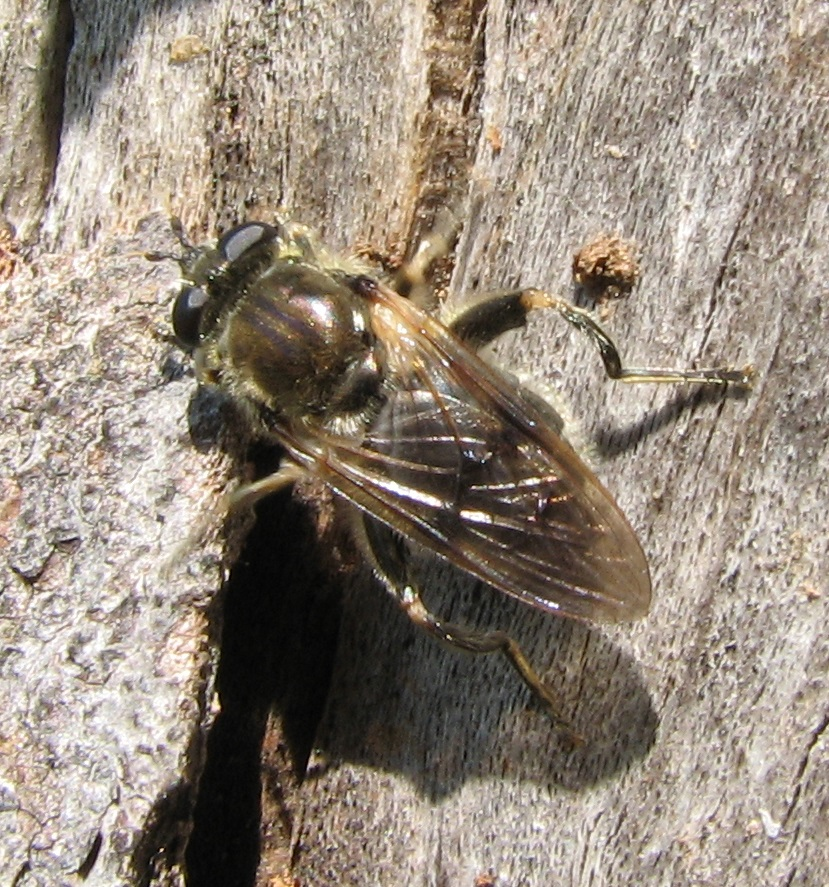

Scientific classification
- Kingdom: Animalia
- Phylum: Arthropoda
- Clade: Pancrustacea
- Class: Insecta
- Order: Diptera
- Family: Syrphidae
- Tribe: Milesiini
- Subtribe: Xylotina
- Genus: Brachypalpus
- Species: B. oarus

Binomial name
- Brachypalpus oarus (Walker, 1849)

Synonyms
- Brachypalpus frontosus Loew, 1872; Brachypalpus margaritus Hull, 1945; Xylota oarus Walker, 1849

= Brachypalpus oarus =

Species of fly

Brachypalpus oarus, the eastern catkin, is a common species of syrphid fly first officially described by Walker in 1849. Hoverflies get their names from the ability to remain nearly motionless while in flight. The adults are also known as flower flies for they are commonly found around and on flowers, from which they get both energy-giving nectar and protein-rich pollen. The larvae are of the rat-tailed type feeding on decaying sap under tree bark.

== Distribution ==
Canada, United States. This nearctic species is located mostly in Northeastern North America, with a population in southwestern Canada. External image
