= Mallota bequaerti =

Scientific classification
- Domain: Eukaryota
- Kingdom: Animalia
- Phylum: Arthropoda
- Class: Insecta
- Order: Diptera
- Family: Syrphidae
- Tribe: Eristalini
- Subtribe: Helophilina
- Genus: Mallota
- Species: M. bequaerti

Binomial name
- Mallota bequaerti Hull, 1956

Species of fly

Mallota bequaerti is a species of syrphid fly in the family Syrphidae.
