= Criorhina formosana =

Scientific classification
- Kingdom: Animalia
- Phylum: Arthropoda
- Clade: Pancrustacea
- Class: Insecta
- Order: Diptera
- Family: Syrphidae
- Subfamily: Eristalinae
- Tribe: Milesiini
- Subtribe: Criorhinina
- Genus: Criorhina
- Species: C. formosana

Binomial name
- Criorhina formosana Shiraki, 1930

Species of fly

Criorhina formosana is a species of hoverfly in the family Syrphidae.

== Distribution ==
Taiwan.
