= Criorhina brevipila =

Scientific classification
- Kingdom: Animalia
- Phylum: Arthropoda
- Clade: Pancrustacea
- Class: Insecta
- Order: Diptera
- Family: Syrphidae
- Subfamily: Eristalinae
- Tribe: Milesiini
- Subtribe: Criorhinina
- Genus: Criorhina
- Species: C. brevipila

Binomial name
- Criorhina brevipila Loew, 1871

Synonyms
- Criorrhina brevipila Loew, 1871; Criorhina thompsoni Violovich, 1982; Criorrhina montivaga Violovich, 1973

Species of fly

Criorhina brevipila is a species of hoverfly in the family Syrphidae.

== Distribution ==
Russia.
