= Brachypalpus longifacies =

Scientific classification
- Kingdom: Animalia
- Phylum: Arthropoda
- Class: Insecta
- Order: Diptera
- Family: Syrphidae
- Tribe: Milesiini
- Subtribe: Xylotina
- Genus: Brachypalpus
- Species: B. longifacies

Binomial name
- Brachypalpus longifacies Mutin & Ichige, 2019

Species of fly

Brachypalpus longifacies is a species of hoverfly in the family Syrphidae.

== Distribution ==
Russia.
