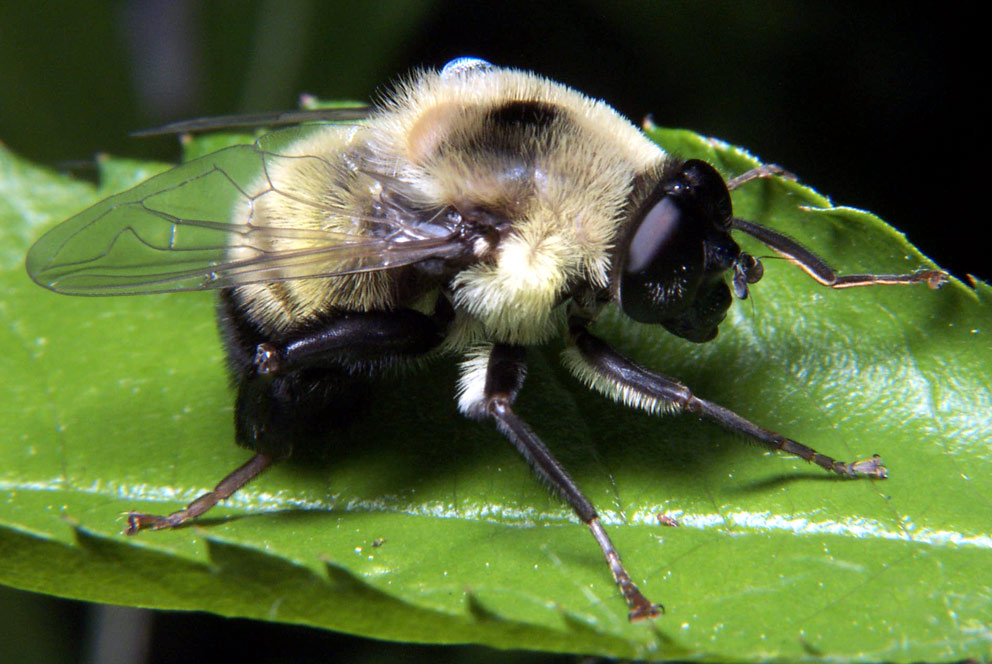
- Mallota cf.cimbiciformis

Scientific classification
- Kingdom: Animalia
- Phylum: Arthropoda
- Class: Insecta
- Order: Diptera
- Family: Syrphidae
- Genus: Mallota
- Species: M. cimbiciformis

Binomial name
- Mallota cimbiciformis (Fallen, 1817)

= Mallota cimbiciformis =

Species of fly

Mallota cimbiciformis is a Palearctic hoverfly.

== Description ==
For terms see Morphology of Diptera
A large (wing length 11·25-12·5 mm.) greenish-yellow and black fly which is a bumblebee mimic. The face is strongly dusted grey or grey-white, with a shining black median stripe, The antennae are red-brown with segments 1 and 2 sometimes black. The thorax is dull greenish-yellow, with long dense yellow hairs and a clear yellow scutellum. The tergites are black, with grey or mixed grey and black hairs 2, and occasionally 3 and 4, with a more or less obvious pair of reddish side-markings. The wings have a brown anterior cloud across the middle. The legs which have very large curved hind femora are partly black with at least the tibiae and tarsi partly or extensively reddish. Mallota differ from the similar Merodon by the angle of intersection of wing veins M1 and R4+5, acute and close to the wing edge in Mallota a right angle in Merodon The larva is of the rat-tailed type, that is with a tube-like breathing siphon at the rear end. The larva is described and figured by Rotheray (1994). External images

== Distribution ==
Fennoscandia south to the Pyrenees and central Spain and North Africa. Britain east through most of Europe to central Siberia; northern Iran

== Habitat ==
The habitat is Fagus sylvatica and Quercus robur forest with mature and senescent trees, and evergreen oak forest of Quercus suber and Quercus ilex.

== Biology ==
Adults are arboreal, but descends to feed in glades and open areas. They have a rapid zigzag flight. Flowers visited include Cistus, Cornus sanguinea, Rosa canina, Rubus, Sambucus ebulus and Sarothamnus scoparius. Both sexes are found near rotholes. The flight period is June to August. The rat-tailed larvae are saprophagous. Maibach & Goeldlin give an account of larval biology
