= Brachypalpus dives =

Scientific classification
- Kingdom: Animalia
- Phylum: Arthropoda
- Class: Insecta
- Order: Diptera
- Family: Syrphidae
- Tribe: Milesiini
- Subtribe: Xylotina
- Genus: Brachypalpus
- Species: B. dives

Binomial name
- Brachypalpus dives (Brunetti, 1908)

Synonyms
- Xylota dives Brunetti, 1908; Xylota assamensis Brunetti, 1908

Species of fly

Brachypalpus dives is a species of hoverfly in the family Syrphidae.

== Distribution ==
India.
