= Brachypalpus femoratus =

Scientific classification
- Kingdom: Animalia
- Phylum: Arthropoda
- Class: Insecta
- Order: Diptera
- Family: Syrphidae
- Tribe: Milesiini
- Subtribe: Xylotina
- Genus: Brachypalpus
- Species: B. femoratus

Binomial name
- Brachypalpus femoratus (Williston, 1882)

Synonyms
- Crioprora femorata Williston, 1882

Species of fly

Brachypalpus femorata, the orange catkint, is an uncommon species of syrphid fly first officially described by Williston in 1882. Hoverflies get their names from the ability to remain nearly motionless while in flight. The adults are also known as flower flies for they are commonly found around and on flowers, from which they get both energy-giving nectar and protein-rich pollen. The larvae are of the rat-tailed type feeding on decaying sap under tree bark.

== Distribution ==
Canada, United States. This nearctic species is noted from the western North America.

External map
