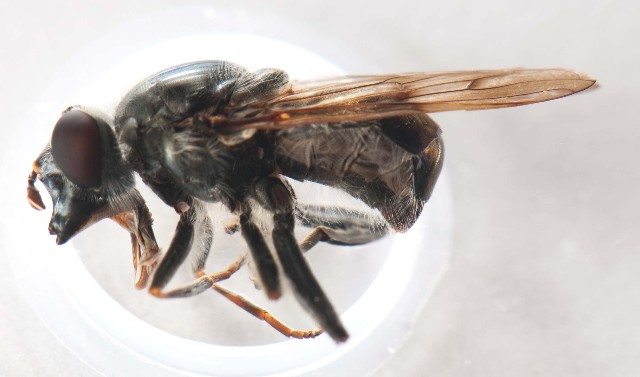
- Brachypalpus cyanella

Scientific classification
- Kingdom: Animalia
- Phylum: Arthropoda
- Class: Insecta
- Order: Diptera
- Family: Syrphidae
- Tribe: Milesiini
- Subtribe: Xylotina
- Genus: Brachypalpus
- Species: B. alopex

Binomial name
- Brachypalpus alopex Osten Sacken, 1877

= Brachypalpus cyanella =

Species of fly

Brachypalpus cyanella , the Longnose Catkin, is a rare species of syrphid fly first officially described by Osten Sacken in 1877 Hoverflies get their names from the ability to remain nearly motionless while in flight. The adults are also known as flower flies, for they are commonly found around and on flowers from which they get both energy-giving nectar and protein-rich pollen. The larvae are of the rat-tailed type feeding on decaying sap under tree bark.

== Distribution ==
This is a nearctic species distributed in the southern and central parts of California

External map
