= Criorhina portschinskyi =

Scientific classification
- Kingdom: Animalia
- Phylum: Arthropoda
- Clade: Pancrustacea
- Class: Insecta
- Order: Diptera
- Family: Syrphidae
- Subfamily: Eristalinae
- Tribe: Milesiini
- Subtribe: Criorhinina
- Genus: Criorhina
- Species: C. portschinskyi

Binomial name
- Criorhina portschinskyi (Stackelberg, 1955)

Synonyms
- Penthesilea portschinskyi Stackelberg, 1955

Species of fly

Criorhina portschinskyi is a species of hoverfly in the family Syrphidae, belonging to the subtribe Criorhinina within the tribe Milesiini. Like other members of the genus Criorhina, it is a bumblebee mimic.

== Description ==
Criorhina portschinskyi is a medium to large sized hoverfly. Like other Criorhina species, it is a large, hairy bee mimic characterized by a face strongly extended downwards and an oblique anterior cross vein (r-m) reaching the anterior margin of the discal cell in the distal half. The head is much flattened and broader than the thorax, with antennae situated upon a prominent conical frontal process. The eyes are bare and the abdomen is elliptical.

== Biology ==
Adults are typically found flying near white spring flowers in woodlands and shrubs during May. Like other members of the genus, the larvae are saproxylic and develop in rot holes or decaying hardwoods.

== Distribution ==
Criorhina portschinskyi is found in the Transcaucasia and Northern Caucasus regions. It has been recorded from:

- Armenia
- Georgia
- Iran (northern Elburz Mountains, near the Caucasus, at low altitudes)
