= Criorhina bubulcus =

Scientific classification
- Kingdom: Animalia
- Phylum: Arthropoda
- Clade: Pancrustacea
- Class: Insecta
- Order: Diptera
- Family: Syrphidae
- Subfamily: Eristalinae
- Tribe: Milesiini
- Subtribe: Criorhinina
- Genus: Criorhina
- Species: C. bubulcus

Binomial name
- Criorhina bubulcus (Walker, 1849)

Synonyms
- Criorhina luna Lovett, 1919; Milesia bubulcus Walker, 1849

Species of fly

Criorhina bubulcus is a species of syrphid fly in the family Syrphidae.

== Distribution ==
Canada, United States.
