= Brachypalpus nipponicus =

Scientific classification
- Kingdom: Animalia
- Phylum: Arthropoda
- Class: Insecta
- Order: Diptera
- Family: Syrphidae
- Tribe: Milesiini
- Subtribe: Xylotina
- Genus: Brachypalpus
- Species: B. nipponicus

Binomial name
- Brachypalpus nipponicus Shiraki, 1952

Synonyms
- Cynorrhina kyotoensis Shiraki, 1968; Brachypalpus dentitibia Violovich, 1960

Species of fly

Brachypalpus nipponicus is a species of hoverfly in the family Syrphidae.

== Distribution ==
Japan.
