= Criorhina fusca =

Scientific classification
- Kingdom: Animalia
- Phylum: Arthropoda
- Clade: Pancrustacea
- Class: Insecta
- Order: Diptera
- Family: Syrphidae
- Genus: Criorhina
- Species: C. fusca

Binomial name
- Criorhina fusca (Weisman, 1964)

Synonyms
- Sphecomyia fusca Weisman, 1964

Species of fly

Criorhina fusca is a species of hoverfly in the family Syrphidae.

== Distribution ==
United States.
