= Criorhina arctophiloides =

Scientific classification
- Kingdom: Animalia
- Phylum: Arthropoda
- Clade: Pancrustacea
- Class: Insecta
- Order: Diptera
- Family: Syrphidae
- Subfamily: Eristalinae
- Tribe: Milesiini
- Subtribe: Criorhinina
- Genus: Criorhina
- Species: C. arctophiloides

Binomial name
- Criorhina arctophiloides (Giglio-Tos, 1892)

Synonyms
- Crioprora arctophiloides Giglio-Tos, 1892; Criorhina tapeta Fluke, 1939

Species of fly

Criorhina arctophiloides is a species of hoverfly in the family Syrphidae.

== Distribution ==
Mexico.
