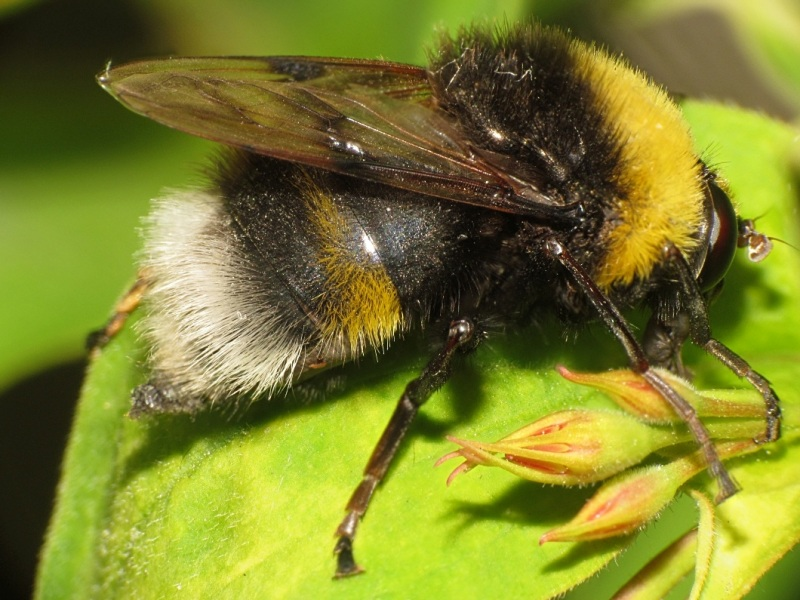

Scientific classification
- Kingdom: Animalia
- Phylum: Arthropoda
- Class: Insecta
- Order: Diptera
- Family: Syrphidae
- Subfamily: Eristalinae
- Tribe: Milesiini
- Subtribe: Xylotina
- Genus: Pocota
- Species: P. personata

Binomial name
- Pocota personata (Harris, 1780)

Synonyms
- Musca personatus Harris, 1780; Musca apiformis Schrank, 1781; Syrphus collaris Gravenhorst, 1807; Milesia apicata Meigen, 1822

= Pocota personata =

Species of fly

Pocota personata is a species of European hover fly.

== Distribution ==
England.
