= Brachypalpus amithaon =

Scientific classification
- Kingdom: Animalia
- Phylum: Arthropoda
- Class: Insecta
- Order: Diptera
- Family: Syrphidae
- Tribe: Milesiini
- Subtribe: Xylotina
- Genus: Brachypalpus
- Species: B. amithaon

Binomial name
- Brachypalpus amithaon (Walker, 1849)

Synonyms
- Milesia amithaon Walker, 1849

Species of fly

Brachypalpus amithaon is a species of hoverfly in the family Syrphidae.

== Distribution ==
United States.
