= Brachypalpus chrysites =

Scientific classification
- Kingdom: Animalia
- Phylum: Arthropoda
- Class: Insecta
- Order: Diptera
- Family: Syrphidae
- Tribe: Milesiini
- Subtribe: Xylotina
- Genus: Brachypalpus
- Species: B. chrysites

Binomial name
- Brachypalpus chrysites Egger, 1859

Species of fly

Brachypalpus chrysites is a species of hoverfly in the family Syrphidae.

== Distribution ==
Austria.
