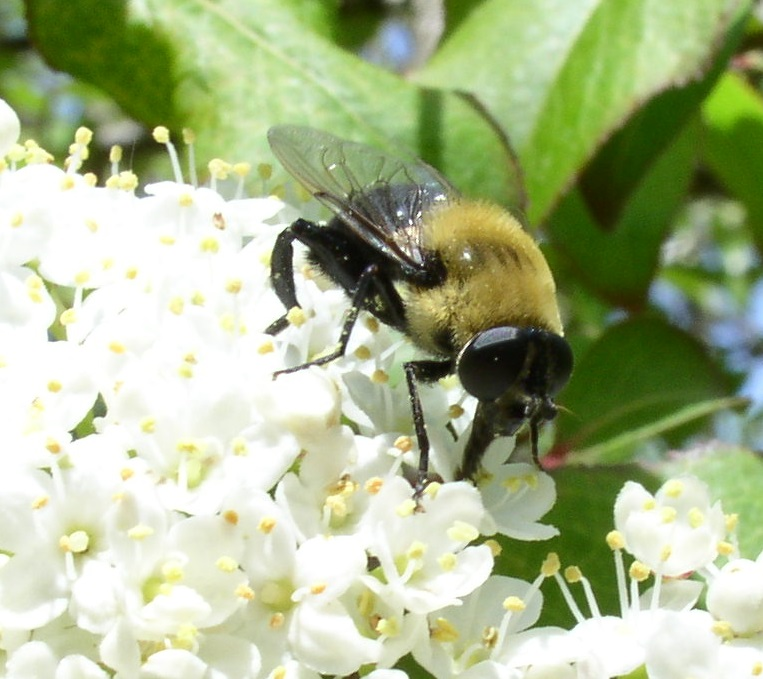

Scientific classification
- Kingdom: Animalia
- Phylum: Arthropoda
- Class: Insecta
- Order: Diptera
- Family: Syrphidae
- Genus: Mallota
- Species: M. bautias

Binomial name
- Mallota bautias (Walker, 1849)

= Mallota bautias =

Species of fly

Mallota bautias is a species of hoverfly (Diptera: Syrphidae). It is known for being particularly bee-like. It is found in eastern North America.
