= Brachypalpus cyanogaster =

Scientific classification
- Kingdom: Animalia
- Phylum: Arthropoda
- Class: Insecta
- Order: Diptera
- Family: Syrphidae
- Tribe: Milesiini
- Subtribe: Xylotina
- Genus: Brachypalpus
- Species: B. cyanogaster

Binomial name
- Brachypalpus cyanogaster Loew, 1872

Species of fly

Brachypalpus cyanogaster, the Bluebottle Catkin, is a rare species of syrphid fly first officially described by Loew in 1872 Hoverflies get their names from the ability to remain nearly motionless while in flight The adults are also known as flower flies for they are commonly found around and on flowers from which they get both energy-giving nectar and protein rich pollen. The larvae are of the rat-tailed type feeding on decaying sap under tree bark.

== Distribution ==
Canada, United States.
