= Pocota stackelbergi =

Scientific classification
- Kingdom: Animalia
- Phylum: Arthropoda
- Class: Insecta
- Order: Diptera
- Family: Syrphidae
- Subfamily: Eristalinae
- Tribe: Milesiini
- Subtribe: Xylotina
- Genus: Pocota
- Species: P. stackelbergi

Binomial name
- Pocota stackelbergi Violovich, 1957

Species of fly

Pocota stackelbergi is a species of Asian hoverfly.

== Distribution ==
Russia.
