= Criorhina verbosa =

Scientific classification
- Kingdom: Animalia
- Phylum: Arthropoda
- Clade: Pancrustacea
- Class: Insecta
- Order: Diptera
- Family: Syrphidae
- Subfamily: Eristalinae
- Tribe: Milesiini
- Subtribe: Criorhinina
- Genus: Criorhina
- Species: C. verbosa

Binomial name
- Criorhina verbosa (Walker, 1849)

Synonyms
- Milesia verbosa Walker, 1849; Milesia verbosa Harris, 1835

Species of fly

Criorhina verbosa ( Walker, 1849 ), the hairy-cheeked bumble fly, is an uncommon species of syrphid fly observed in the eastern to central northeastern United States. Hoverflies can remain nearly motionless in flight. The adults are also known as flower flies for they are commonly found on flowers, from which they get both energy-giving nectar and protein-rich pollen. The larvae of this genus are found in decaying wood.

== Distribution ==
Canada, United States.
