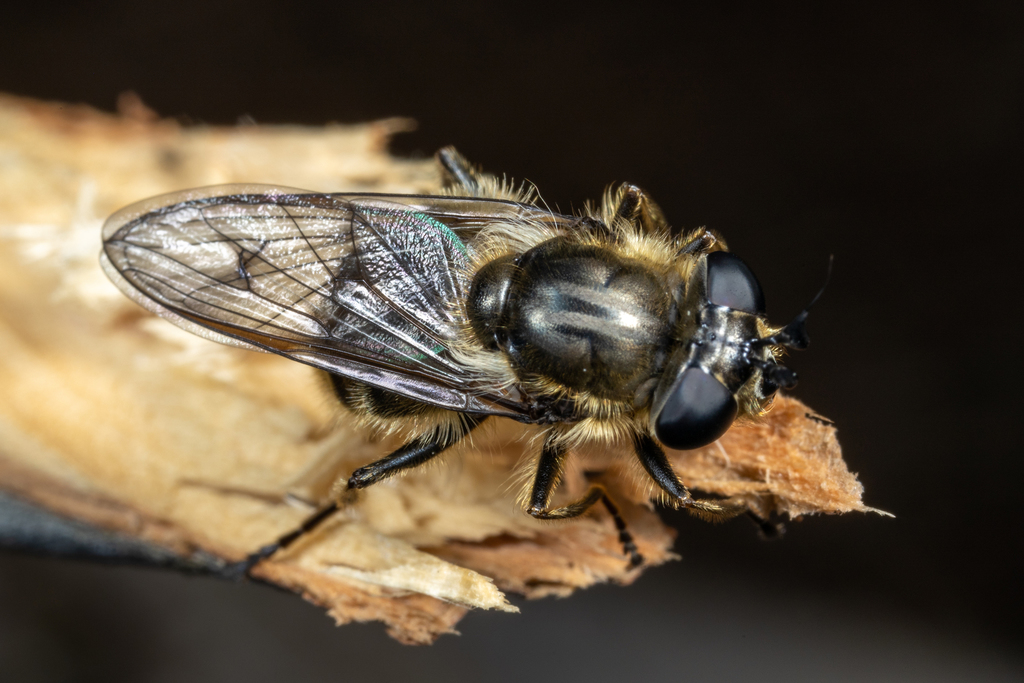

Scientific classification
- Kingdom: Animalia
- Phylum: Arthropoda
- Clade: Pancrustacea
- Class: Insecta
- Order: Diptera
- Family: Syrphidae
- Subfamily: Eristalinae
- Tribe: Milesiini
- Subtribe: Criorhinina
- Genus: Criorhina
- Species: C. villosa

Binomial name
- Criorhina villosa (Bigot, 1879)

Synonyms
- Merapioidus villosus Bigot, 1879

= Criorhina villosa =

Species of fly

Criorhina villosa, the winter bumblefly, is a species of hoverfly in the family Syrphidae. It was formerly placed into its own genus, Merapioidus. Its name has been confused with the name of a related species from Mexico, which was originally described as Romaleosyrphus villosus, and published in 1882; as the two species are now both placed in the same genus, Criorhina, only the older of the two names (the one from 1879) can remain as Criorhina villosa, and the 1882 name will need to be replaced.

== Distribution ==
United States and Canada
