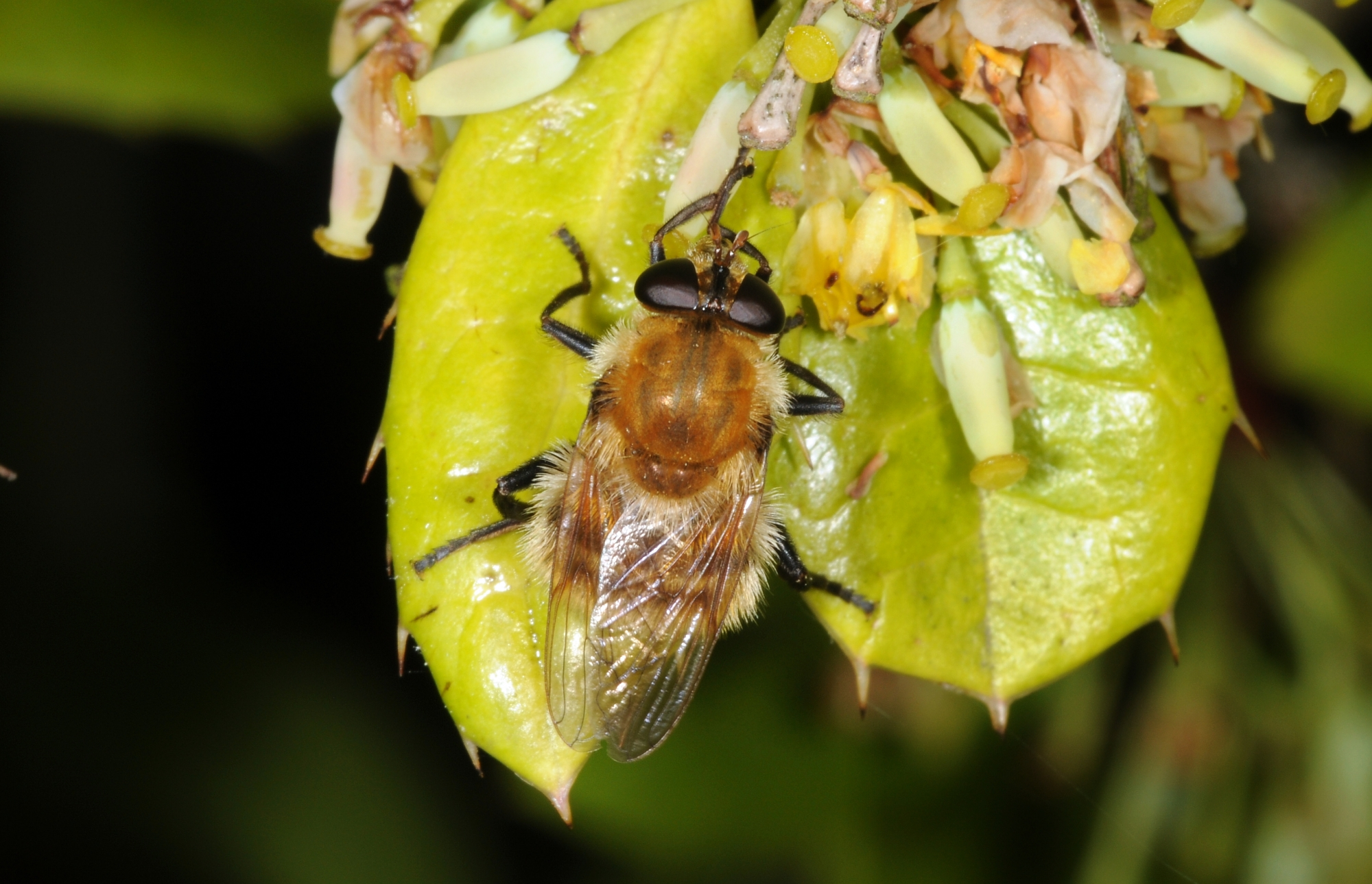
- Criorhina berberina female

Scientific classification
- Kingdom: Animalia
- Phylum: Arthropoda
- Clade: Pancrustacea
- Class: Insecta
- Order: Diptera
- Family: Syrphidae
- Subfamily: Eristalinae
- Tribe: Milesiini
- Subtribe: Criorhinina
- Genus: Criorhina; Meigen, 1822

Type species
- Syrphus asilicus Fallén, 1816

Synonyms
- Show list: Penthesilea Meigen, 1800 (Unav.); Criorhina Meigen, 1822; Chriorhyna Rondani, 1845; Criorrhina Walker, 1851; Chryorhina Rondani, 1856; Criorrhina Egger, 1856; Chryorhyna Rondani, 1857; Criorhyna Rondani, 1865; Merapioidus Bigot, 1879; Brachymyia Williston, 1882; Eurhinamallota Williston, 1882; Eurhinomallota Bigot, 1882; Romaleosyrphus Bigot, 1882; Eurhynomallota Bigot, 1883; Merapioides Bigot, 1884; Rhomaleosyprhus Rye, 1884; Criorrhina Verrall, 1901; Eurinomallota Kertész, 1910; Narumyia Shiraki, 1952

= Criorhina =

Genus of flies

Criorhina is a genus of hoverflies. Medium to large sized species, black or greenish black, with or without light ground markings mimicking bumblebees. The head is much flattened and broader than the thorax. The antennae are situated upon a prominent conical frontal process, The face is moderately produced below the eyes, downward or forward, in profile. The eyes are bare. The abdomen is elliptical or very short oval. Larvae found in rot holes or decaying hardwoods

== Gallery ==
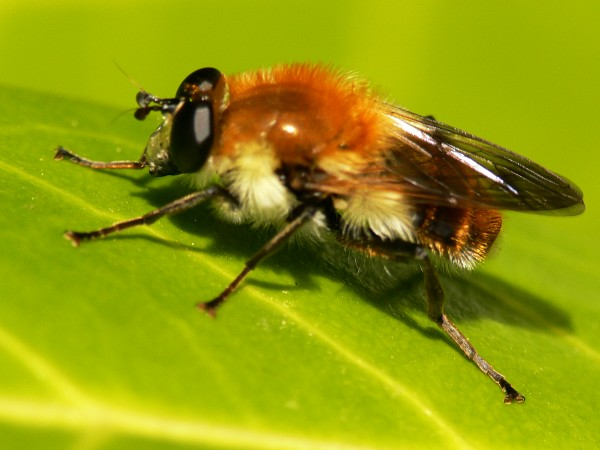
Criorhina floccosa

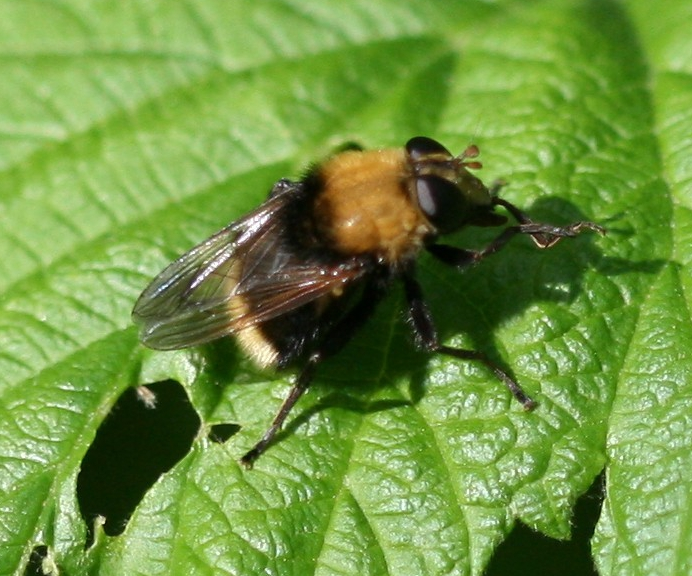
Criorhina berberina

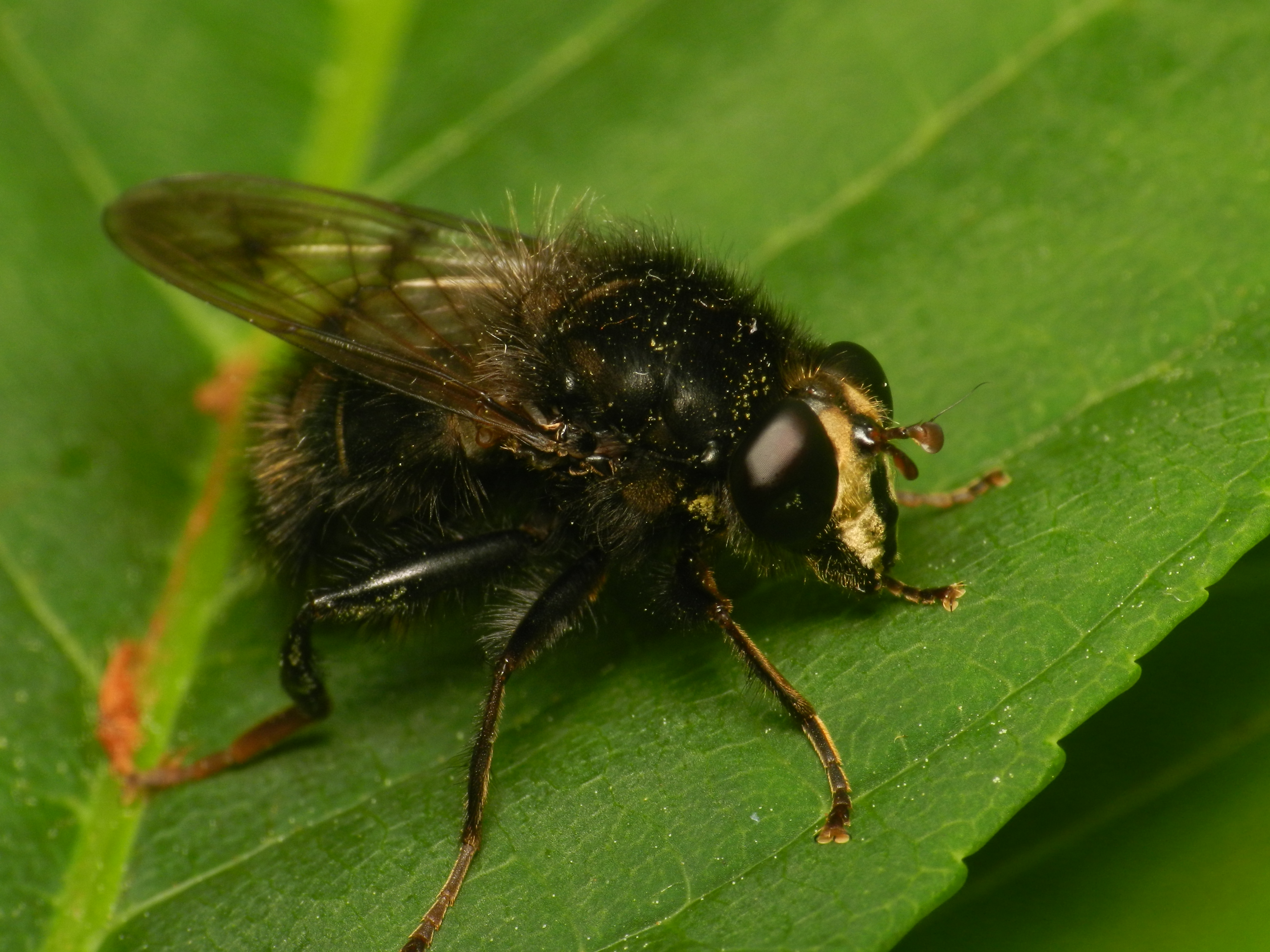
Criorhina ranunculi

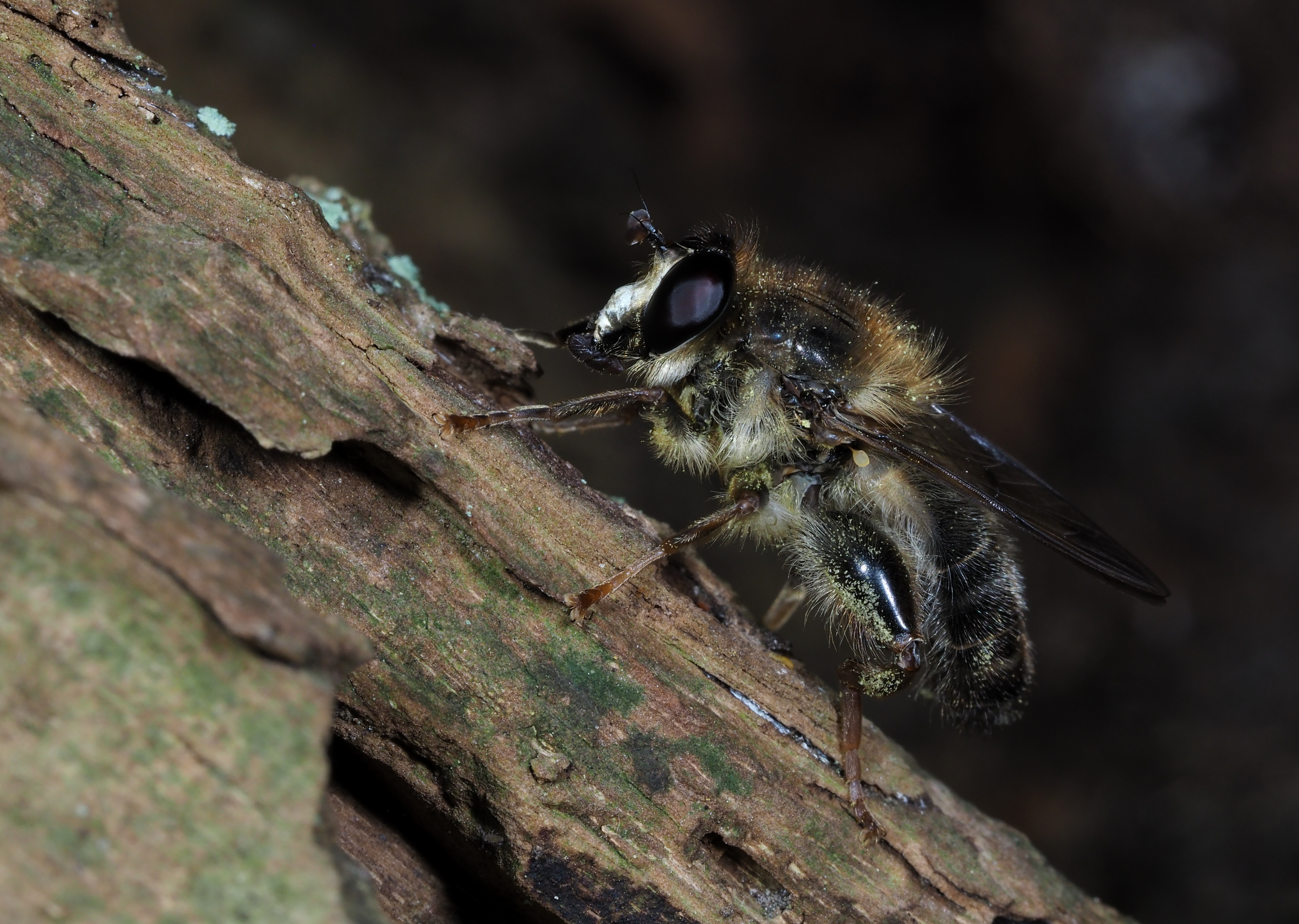
Criorhina pachymera

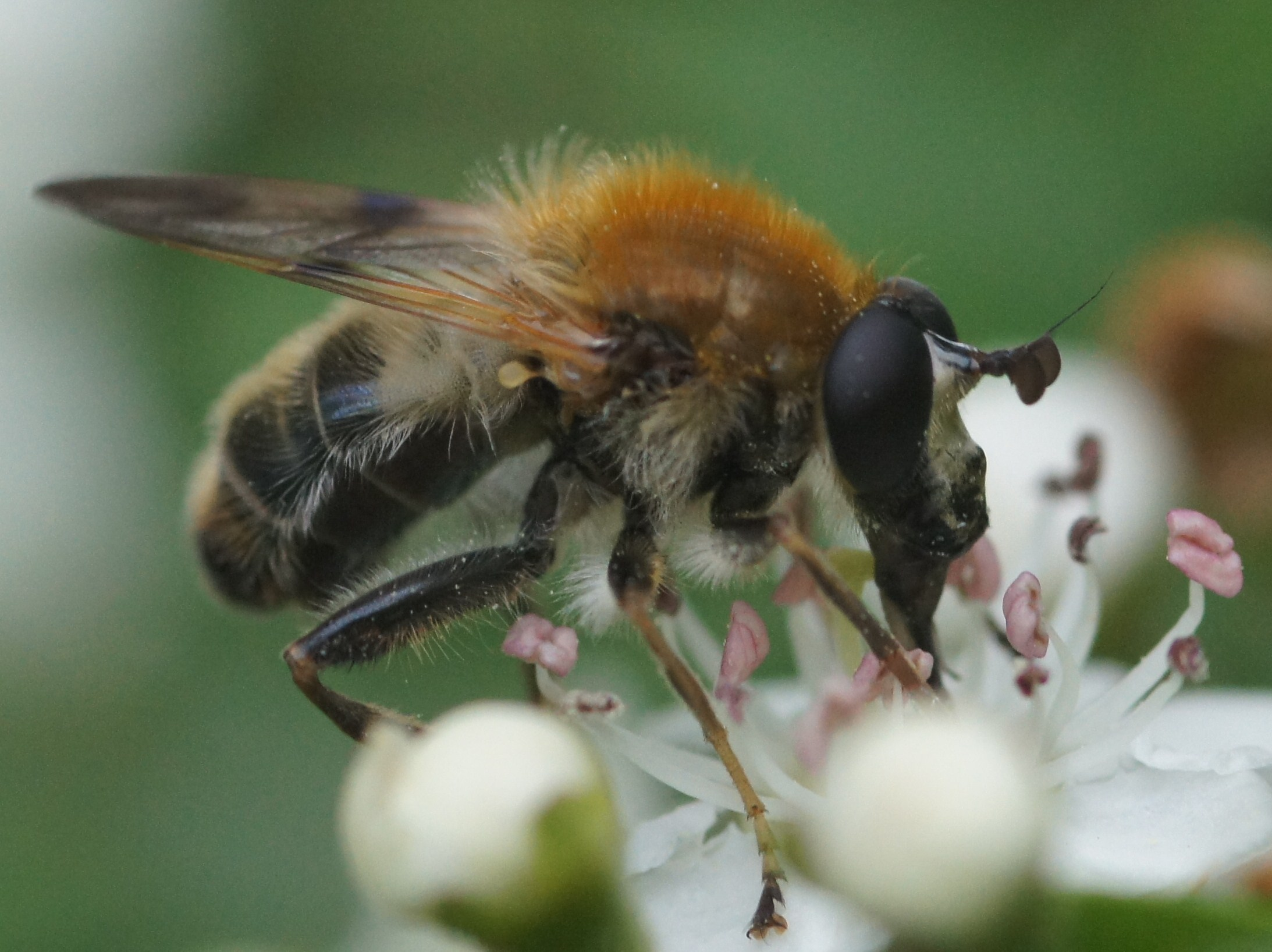
Criorhina asilica (male)

== Species ==
- C. alexandri Mutin, 1999
- C. apicalis Matsumura, 1916
- C. arctophiloides (Giglio-Tos, 1892)
- C. asilica (Fallén, 1816)
- C. aurea Lovett, 1919
- C. berberina (Fabricius, 1805)
- C. bomboides Hull, 1944
- C. brevipila Loew, 1871
- C. bubulcus (Walker, 1849)
- C. caudata Curran, 1925
- C. coquilletti Williston, 1892
- C. crioarctos Hull, 1944
- C. excavata Curran, 1929
- C. floccosa (Meigen, 1822)
- C. formosana Shiraki, 1930
- C. fusca Weisman, 1964
- C. grandis Lovett, 1921
- C. imitator Brunetti, 1915
- C. interrupta Brunetti, 1923
- C. japonica (Matsumura, 1916)
- C. kincaidi Coquillett, 1901
- C. konakovi (Stackelberg, 1955)
- C. kurilensis Mutin, 1999
- C. latipilosa Curran, 1925
- C. nasica (Osburn, 1908)
- C. nigripes (Williston, 1882)
- C. nigriventris Walton, 1911
- C. occidentalis (Osburn, 1908)
- C. pachymera (Egger, 1858)
- C. pallidipes Curran, 1929
- C. pallipilosa Hull, 1944
- C. portschinskyi (Stackelberg, 1955)
- C. quadriboscis Lovett, 1919
- C. ranunculi (Panzer, 1804)
- C. rostrata Li, Huo & Li, 2020
- C. rubropilosa Hull, 1950
- C. sichotana (Stackelberg, 1955)
- C. simioides (Brunetti, 1908)
- C. spinitarsis Curran, 1929
- C. takaoensis (Shiraki, 1952)
- C. talyshensis (Stackelberg, 1960)
- C. tricolor Coquillett, 1900
- C. tripilosa Coe, 1964
- C. ussuriana (Stackelberg, 1955)
- C. verbosa (Walker, 1849)
- C. villosa (Bigot, 1879)
- "C. villosa" (Bigot, 1882) (Homonym)
- C. vivida Brunetti, 1923
