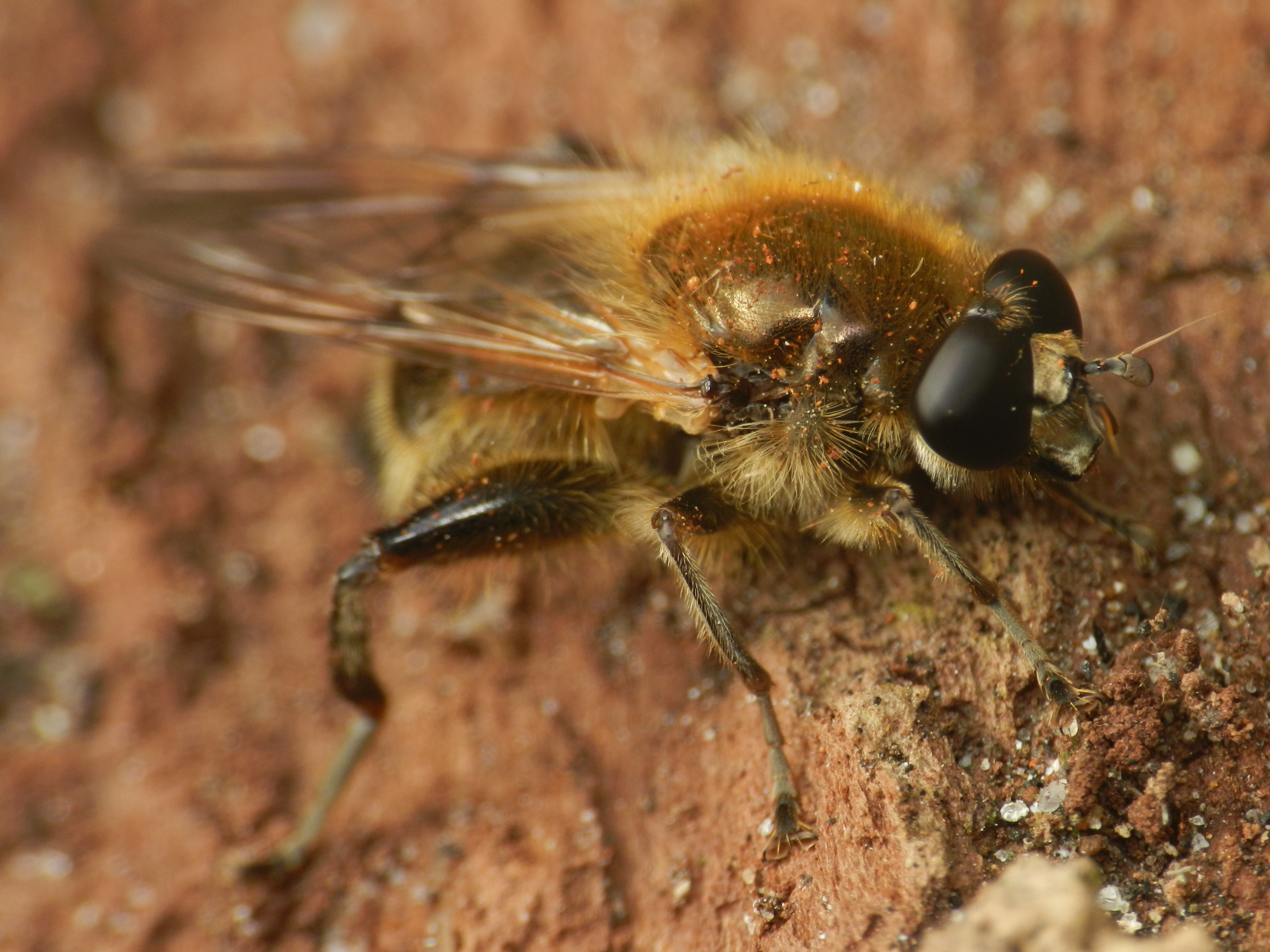
- Brachypalpus valgus

Scientific classification
- Kingdom: Animalia
- Phylum: Arthropoda
- Class: Insecta
- Order: Diptera
- Family: Syrphidae
- Subfamily: Eristalinae
- Tribe: Milesiini
- Subtribe: Xylotina
- Genus: Brachypalpus; Macquart, 1834

Type species
- Brachypalpus tuberculatus Macquart, 1834

Synonyms
- Brachipalpus Rondani, 1845; Crioprora Osten-Sacken, 1878

= Brachypalpus =

Genus of flies

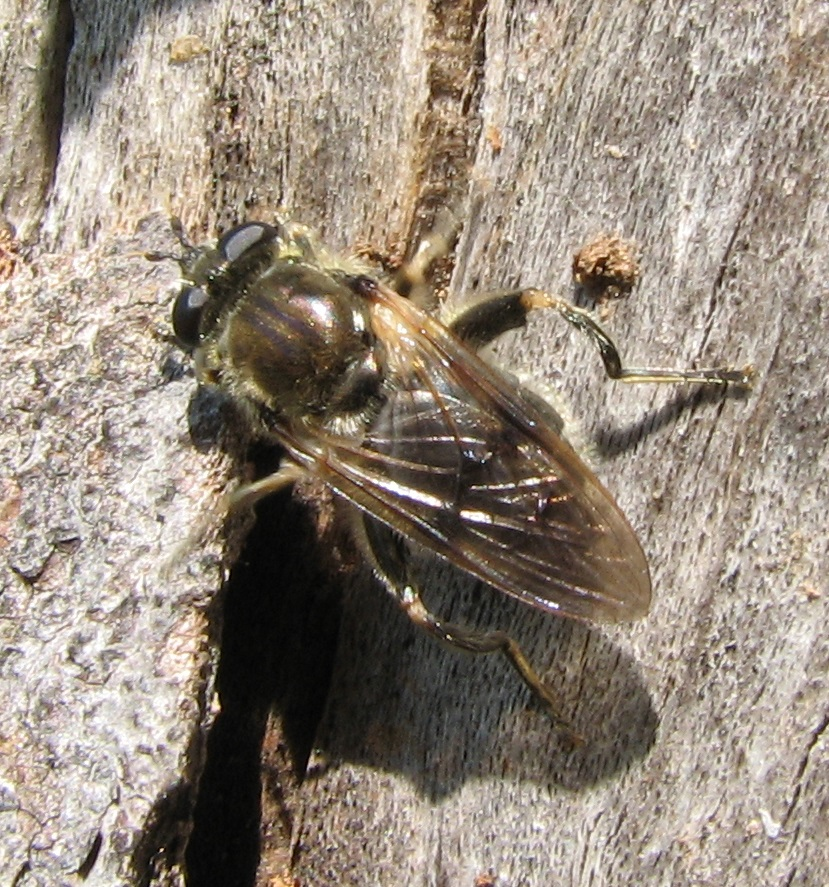
Brachypalpus oarus

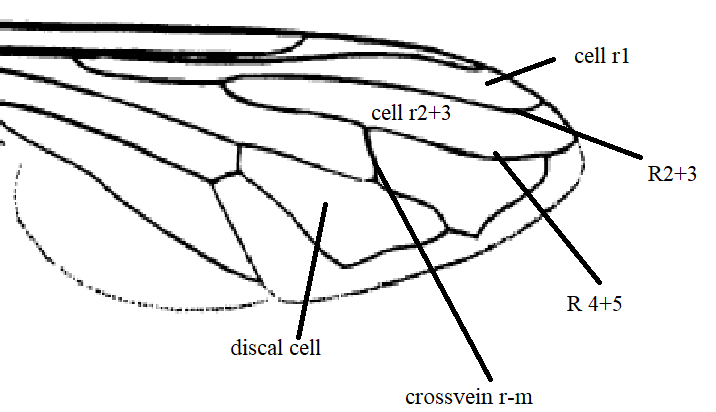
brachypalpus diagram

Brachypalpus is a genus of hoverflies, from the family Syrphidae, in the order Diptera. The head is triangular and produced well forwards and somewhat downwards. The thorax and abdomen with pile often rather long. The hind femur is swollen and with an obtuse spur apically and ventrally. The hind trochanters of male is spurred.
The larvae are of the rat-tailed type feeding on decaying sap under tree bark. Larvae live in decaying trees and logs. Larva and pupa have been described by Malloch.

== Species ==
- Brachypalpus alopex (Osten Sacken, 1877)
- Brachypalpus amithaon Walker, 1849
- Brachypalpus chrysites Egger, 1859
- Brachypalpus cyanella Osten Sacken, 1877
- Brachypalpus cyanogaster Loew, 1872
- Brachypalpus dives (Brunetti, 1908)
- Brachypalpus femoratus (Williston, 1882)
- Brachypalpus laphriformis Fallén, 1816
- Brachypalpus longifacies Mutin & Ichige, 2019
- Brachypalpus nigrifacies Stackelberg, 1965
- Brachypalpus nipponicus Shiraki, 1952
- Brachypalpus oarus (Walker, 1849)
- Brachypalpus olivaceus Meigen, 1822
- Brachypalpus valgus (Panzer, 1798)
- Brachypalpus zugmayeriae Mik, 1887
