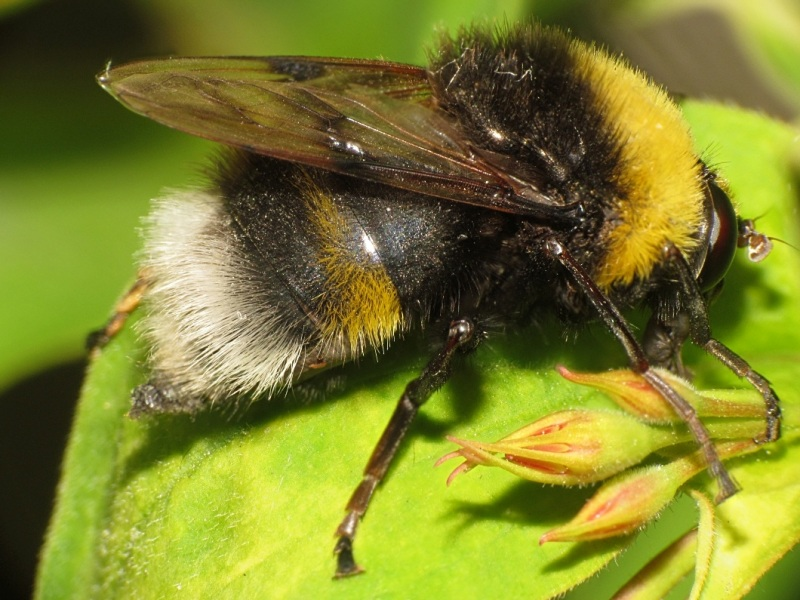
- Female P. personata

Scientific classification
- Kingdom: Animalia
- Phylum: Arthropoda
- Class: Insecta
- Order: Diptera
- Family: Syrphidae
- Subfamily: Eristalinae
- Tribe: Milesiini
- Subtribe: Xylotina
- Genus: Pocota; Le Peletier & Serville, 1828

Type species
- Milesia apicata Meigen, 1822

Synonyms
- Dasymyia Egger, 1858; Ploccata Jacobs, 1901; Plocota Bigot, 1883; Plocota Schiner, 1857; Pocata Woodworth, 1913; Pseudopocota Mutin & Barkalov, 1995

= Pocota =

Genus of flies

Pocota is a genus of hoverflies, from the family Syrphidae, in the order Diptera.

== Species ==
- P. bomboides Hunter, 1897
- P. personata (Harris, 1780)
- P. stackelbergi Violovich, 1957
