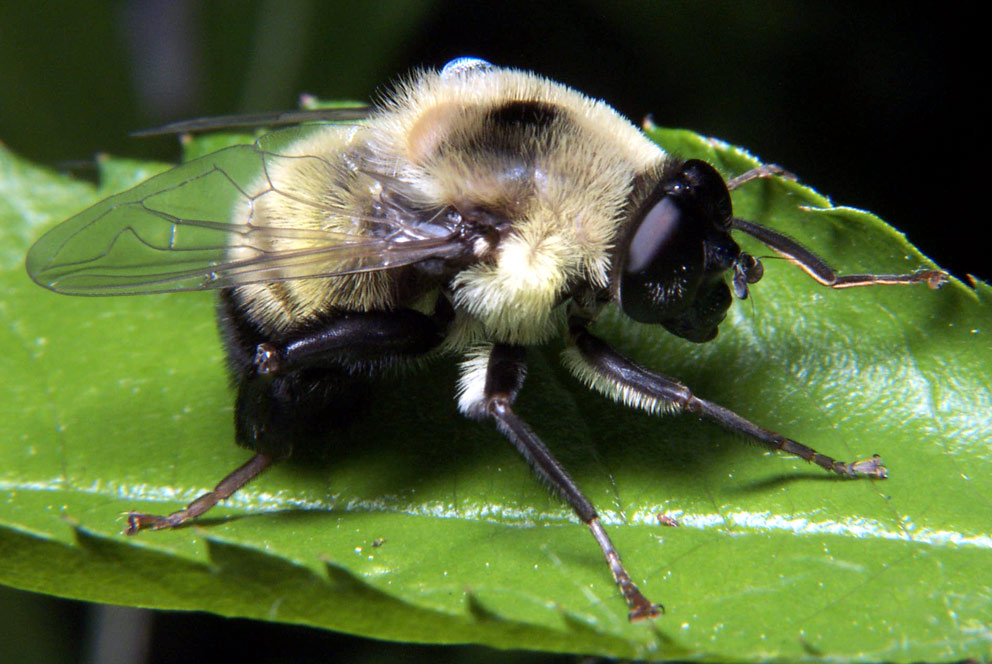
- Mallota spp possibly cimbiciformis

Scientific classification
- Kingdom: Animalia
- Phylum: Arthropoda
- Class: Insecta
- Order: Diptera
- Family: Syrphidae
- Subtribe: Helophilina
- Genus: Mallota; Meigen, 1822

Species
- >75 species

= Mallota =

Genus of flies

Mallota is a widely distributed Holarctic genus of hoverfly (a member of the fly family Syrphidae), well known for their bee-like appearance.

== Species ==
- M. abdominalis Sack, 1927
- M. aenigma Bezzi, 1912
- M. albipilis Snow, 1895
- M. albipes Snow, 1895
- M. bautias (Walker, 1849)
- M. bequaerti Hull, 1956
- M. bicolor Sack, 1910
- M. cimbiciformis (Fallén, 1817)
- M. cingulata Sack, 1927
- M. curvigaster (Macquart, 1842)
- M. dasyops (Wiedemann, 1819)
- M. dusmeti Andreu, 1925
- M. extrema (Loew, 1858)
- M. fuciformis (Fabricius, 1794)
- M. hirsuta Hull, 1941
- M. illinoensis _{Robertson, 1901}
- M. inopinata Violovich, 1975
- M. megilliformis (Fallén, 1817)
- M. meromacrimima Hull, 1941
- M. mississipensis Hull, 1946
- M. munda Violovich, 1955
- M. orientalis Wiedemann, 1824
- M. posticata (Fabricius, 1805)
- M. rossica Portschinsky, 1877
- M. rubripes Matsumura, 1916
- M. sackeni Williston, 1882
- M. shatalkini Mutin, 1999
- M. spinosa _{Hirooka & Maruyama, 2015}
- M. thompsoni Hirooka & Maruyama, 2015
- M. tricolor Loew, 1871
- M. vilis Wiedemann, 1830 ("Non-European Two-Winged Insects as a Continuation of Meigen's Work. Second Part.")
- M. viridiflavescentis Huo & Ren, 2006
