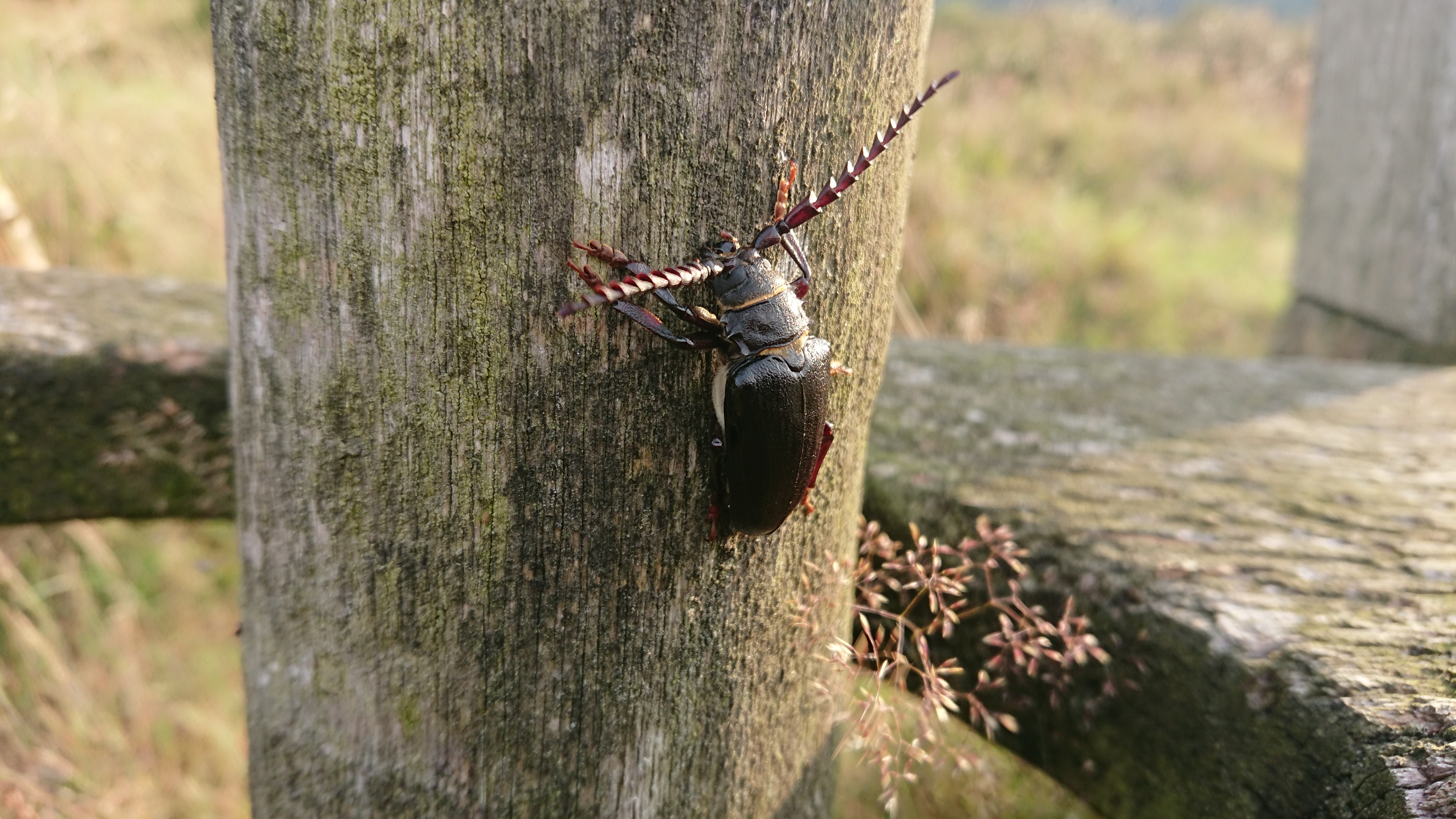

Scientific classification
- Kingdom: Animalia
- Phylum: Arthropoda
- Clade: Pancrustacea
- Class: Insecta
- Order: Coleoptera
- Suborder: Polyphaga
- Infraorder: Cucujiformia
- Family: Cerambycidae
- Genus: Prionus
- Species: P. laticollis

Binomial name
- Prionus laticollis (Drury, 1773)

Synonyms
- Prionus brevicornis Fabricius, 1801; Prionus densus Casey, 1924; Prionus frosti Casey, 1924; Prionus kempi Casey, 1912; Prionus nigrescens Casey, 1924; Prionus parvus Casey, 1912

= Prionus laticollis =

Species of beetle

Prionus laticollis, also known as the broad-necked root borer or broad necked prionus, is a root-boring longhorn beetle described by Dru Drury in 1773. It is widespread throughout eastern North America: its range covers a vast swath from Quebec in the northeast to Arkansas in the southwest.

The larvae damage trees and other plants by feeding on their roots. They are mostly active during dusk and at night. They are good burrowers and hide at the base of oak trees and other food sources. The female is larger than the male, with an ovipositor used to deposit eggs. When the female is laying eggs, she "shivers" and eggs are laid through the ovipositor, positioned down into the soil or under litter, usually in groups of threes and twos, but sometimes ones or fours. After the eggs are laid, the female moves her ovipositor up and down to fill the hole she created. When freshly laid, the eggs are pure white, glistening with moisture, but, after a while, they usually change to a deep yellow. Within a few days, the deep yellow eggs turn to a light washed pink. As the larvae develop inside, the eggs turn ivory in color. The eggs are the size of small grains of rice. When the larvae are hatching, they chew through one of the elongated, pointed sides of the egg. The larvae's heads are adapted for digging into the soil, and they have strong black mandibles for chewing roots.

Larvae tunnel downward to feed on the living roots of a variety of trees and shrubs. At first, they may feed on bark, but then proceed to hollow out small roots. They often feed on dead wood, with a preference for soft food. Pupation occurs in spring, about 10 cm under the ground. During pupation parts of the digestive tract degenerate. The life cycle is probably three years.

This beetle is about 2-5 cm long, with the females significantly larger than the males. Males fly more often and are attracted to lights.

== Identification ==
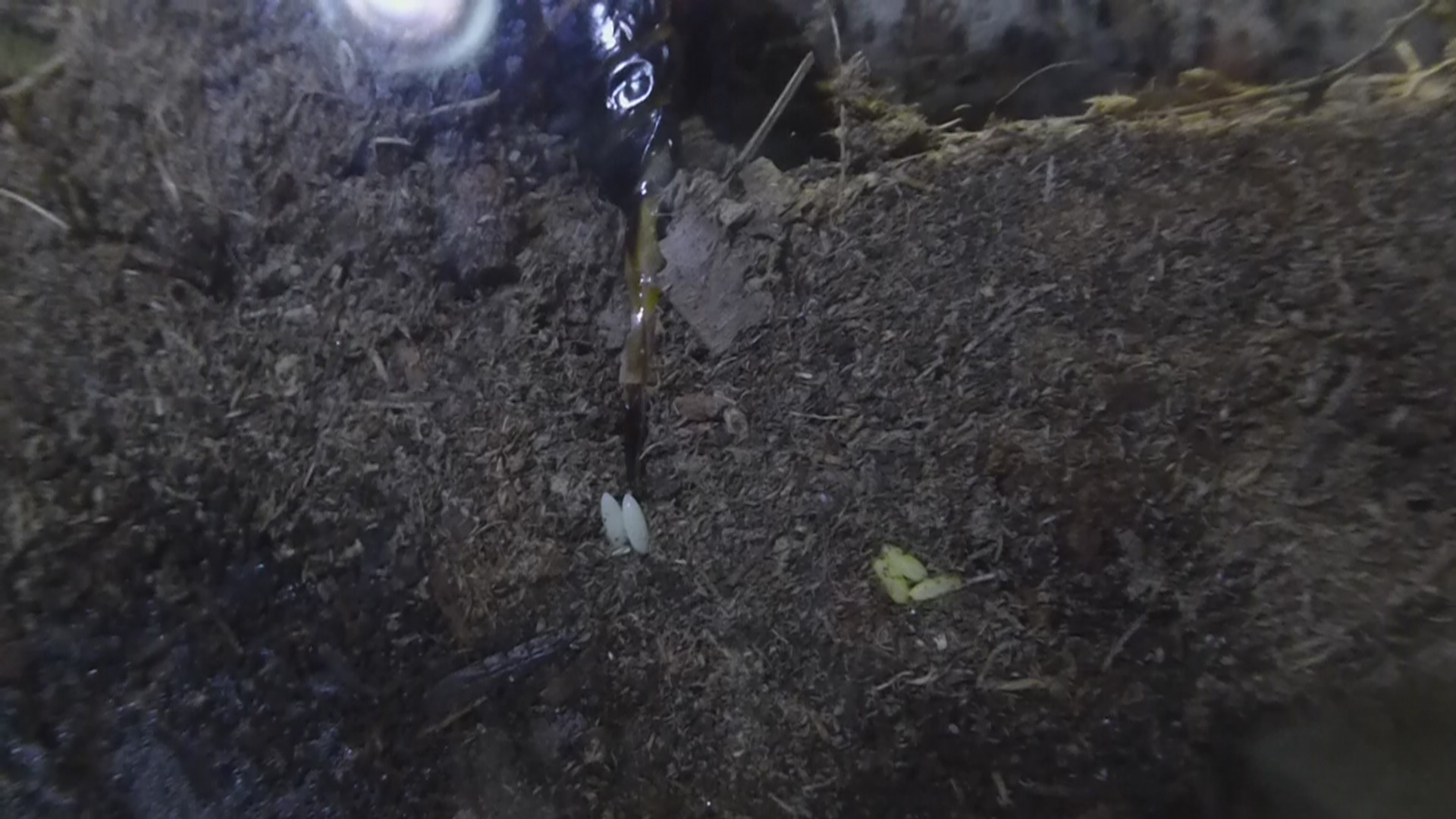
Prionus laticollis with ovipositor extended laying eggs

The species is distinct among the eastern American species of Prionus for its rugose-punctate elytral texture and antennae with 12 antennomeres. Other species have 12 antennomeres, but have simple punctate elytra (such as P. pocularis) or have more than 12 antennomeres (such as P. imbricornis).
