= Hadromyia cimbiciformis =

Scientific classification
- Kingdom: Animalia
- Phylum: Arthropoda
- Class: Insecta
- Order: Diptera
- Family: Syrphidae
- Tribe: Milesiini
- Subtribe: Xylotina
- Genus: Hadromyia
- Subgenus: Chrysosomidia
- Species: H. cimbiciformis

Binomial name
- Hadromyia cimbiciformis (Portschinsky, 1879)

Synonyms
- Spilomyia cimbiciformis Portschinsky, 1879

Species of fly

Hadromyia cimbiciformis is a species of hoverfly in the family Syrphidae.

== Distribution ==
Russia.
