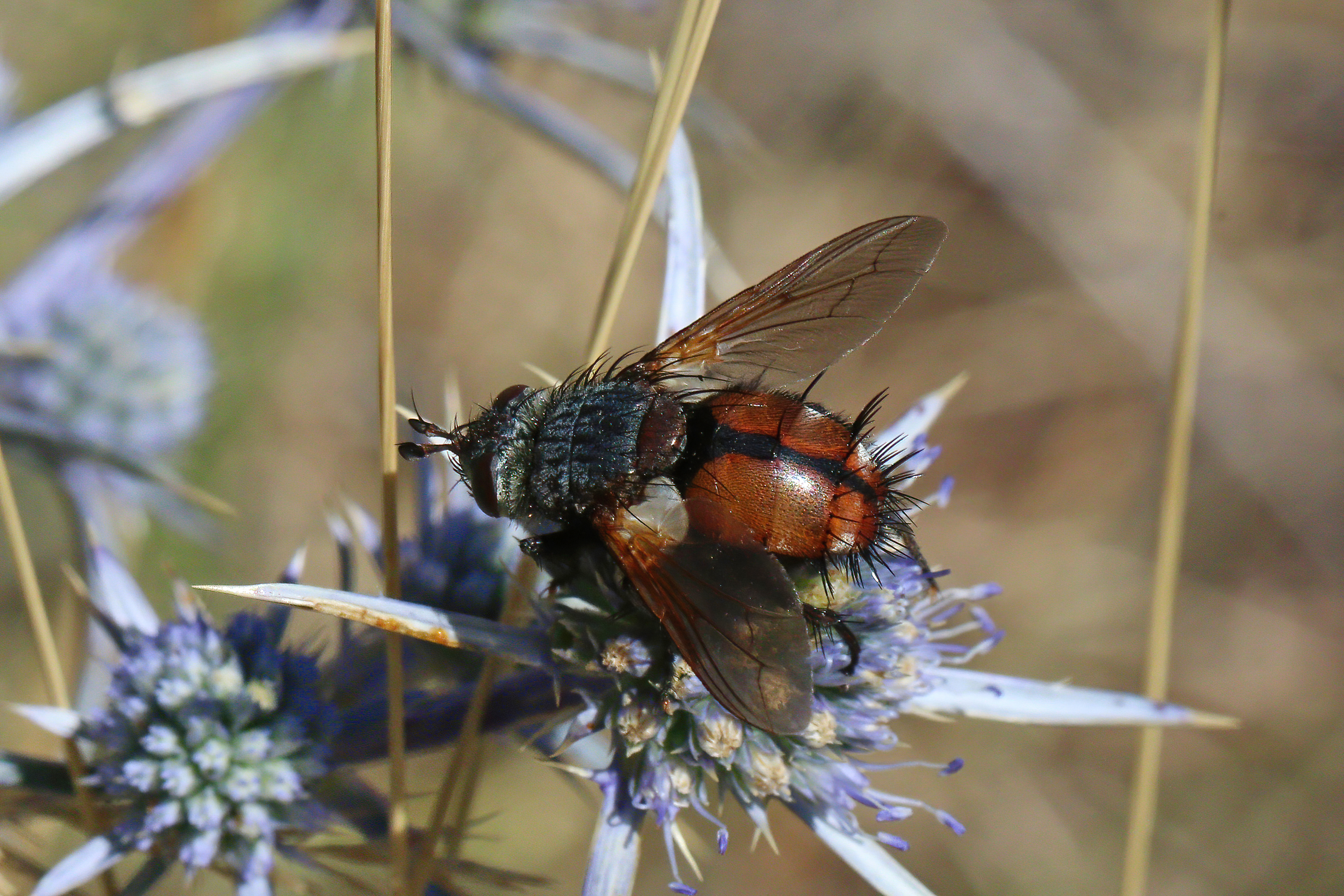
- Peleteria iavana

Scientific classification
- Kingdom: Animalia
- Phylum: Arthropoda
- Class: Insecta
- Order: Diptera
- Family: Tachinidae
- Subfamily: Tachininae
- Tribe: Tachinini
- Genus: Peleteria; Robineau-Desvoidy, 1830

Type species
- Peleteria abdominalis Robineau-Desvoidy, 1830

Synonyms
- Faurella Robineau-Desvoidy, 1830; Cuphocera Macquart, 1845; Palpibraca Rondani, 1846; Ciphocera Rondani, 1863; Sphyricera Lioy, 1864; Sphyrocera Verrall, 1882; Chaetopeleteria Mik, 1894; Choetopeleteria Bezzi, 1894; Popelia Bezzi, 1894; Tetrachaeta Brauer & von Bergenstamm, 1895; Peletieria Bezzi, 1906; Chaetopeletieria Bezzi, 1907; Pleropeleteria Villeneuve, 1916; Cuphoceropsis Townsend, 1935; Paracuphocera Zimin, 1935; Aphriosphyriopsis E.E. Blanchard, 1943; Cuphoceromyia E.E. Blanchard, 1943; Prosteatosoma E.E. Blanchard, 1943; Hemipeletieria Zimin, 1961; Peletieriana Mesnil, 1970

= Peleteria =

Genus of flies

Peleteria is a widespread genus of flies in the family Tachinidae.

== Species ==
Subgenus Oxydosphyria Townsend, 1926

- Peleteria aclista Reinhard, 1956
- Peleteria iterans (Walker, 1849)

Subgenus Panzeriopsis Townsend, 1915

- Peleteria aenea (Stæger, 1849)
- Peleteria alberta Curran, 1925
- Peleteria arctica Malloch, 1919
- Peleteria cornigera Curran, 1925
- Peleteria cornuta Curran, 1925
- Peleteria cornuticaudata Curran, 1925
- Peleteria curriei (Townsend, 1915)

Subgenus Peleteria Robineau-Desvoidy, 1830

- Peleteria abdominalis Robineau-Desvoidy, 1830
- Peleteria aldrichi Curran, 1925
- Peleteria analis (Macquart, 1846)
- Peleteria andina (Blanchard, 1943)
- Peleteria angulata Curran, 1925
- Peleteria apicata Curran, 1925
- Peleteria blanda Curran, 1925
- Peleteria clara Curran, 1925
- Peleteria conjuncta Curran, 1925
- Peleteria fuscisquama Curran, 1925
- Peleteria lalandii Robineau-Desvoidy, 1830
- Peleteria lineata (Blanchard, 1943)
- Peleteria mexicana Curran, 1925
- Peleteria neglecta (Townsend, 1897)
- Peleteria posticata Curran, 1925
- Peleteria regalis Curran, 1925
- Peleteria subandina (Blanchard, 1943)
- Peleteria trifasciata Curran, 1925

Subgenus Sphyrimyia (Bigot, 1883)

- Peleteria anaxias (Walker, 1849)
- Peleteria biangulata Curran, 1925
- Peleteria bryanti Curran, 1925
- Peleteria convexa Curran, 1925
- Peleteria giacomellii (Blanchard, 1943)
- Peleteria grioti (Blanchard, 1943)
- Peleteria haemorrhoa (Wulp, 1867)
- Peleteria incongrua (Reinhard, 1934)
- Peleteria incontesta Curran, 1926
- Peleteria latifasciata Blanchard, 1943
- Peleteria malleola (Bigot, 1883)
- Peleteria mediana Reinhard, 1944
- Peleteria nemochaetoides (Blanchard, 1943)
- Peleteria neotexensis Brooks, 1949
- Peleteria obsoleta Curran, 1925
- Peleteria robusta (Wiedemann, 1830)
- Peleteria semirufa (Blanchard, 1943)
- Peleteria setosa Curran, 1925
- Peleteria thomsoni (Williston, 1886)
- Peleteria torta Reinhard, 1943
- Peleteria townsendi Curran, 1925
- Peleteria valida Curran, 1925

Unplaced to subgenus

- Peleteria acutiforceps Zimin, 1961
- Peleteria adelphe Zimin, 1961
- Peleteria adentata Zimin, 1961
- Peleteria albuquerquei Guimarães, 1962
- Peleteria aralica Smirnov, 1922
- Peleteria bidentata Chao & Zhou, 1987
- Peleteria blanchardi Guimarães, 1971
- Peleteria californiensis (Macquart, 1851)
- Peleteria carnata Reinhard, 1953
- Peleteria chaoi (Zimin, 1961)
- Peleteria cinerascens (Bigot, 1889)
- Peleteria cora (Bigot, 1888)
- Peleteria corusca Richter, 1972
- Peleteria curtiunguls Zimin, 1961
- Peleteria emmesia (Malloch, 1930)
- Peleteria erschoffl (Portschinsky, 1882)
- Peleteria ferina (Zetterstedt, 1844)
- Peleteria filipalpis (Rondani, 1863)
- Peleteria flavobasicosta Chao & Zhou, 1987
- Peleteria frater (Chao & Shi, 1982)
- Peleteria generosa (Wulp, 1892)
- Peleteria honghuang Chao, 1979
- Peleteria iavana (Wiedemann, 1819)
- Peleteria kolomyetzi Zimin, 1965
- Peleteria kuanyan (Chao, 1979)
- Peleteria lianghei Chao, 1979
- Peleteria lithanthrax (Wiedemann, 1830)
- Peleteria longipalpis Emden, 1960
- Peleteria macrocera (Bigot, 1888)
- Peleteria manomera Chao, 1982
- Peleteria maura Chao & Shi, 1982
- Peleteria melania Chao & Shi, 1982
- Peleteria meridionalis (Robineau-Desvoidy, 1830)
- Peleteria mimica Villeneuve, 1913
- Peleteria multispinosa Thompson, 1963
- Peleteria nitella Chao, 1982
- Peleteria pilosa (Malloch, 1930)
- Peleteria placuna Chao, 1982
- Peleteria popelii (Portschinsky, 1882)
- Peleteria prompta (Meigen, 1824)
- Peleteria propinqua (Zimin, 1961)
- Peleteria pygmaea (Macquart, 1851)
- Peleteria qutu Chao, 1979
- Peleteria riwogeensis Chao & Shi, 1982
- Peleteria rubescens (Robineau-Desvoidy, 1830)
- Peleteria rubifrons (Bigot, 1887)
- Peleteria rubihirta Chao & Zhou, 1987
- Peleteria ruficornis (Macquart, 1835)
- Peleteria rustica (Karsch, 1886)
- Peleteria seabrai Guimarães, 1962
- Peleteria semiglabra (Zimin, 1961)
- Peleteria setigera (Malloch, 1930)
- Peleteria sphyricera (Macquart, 1835)
- Peleteria tegulata (Townsend, 1916)
- Peleteria trinitatis Thompson, 1963
- Peleteria triseta Zimin, 1961
- Peleteria umbratica Zimin, 1961
- Peleteria versuta (Loew, 1871)
- Peleteria vittata (Macquart, 1846)
- Peleteria xenoprepes (Loew, 1874)
