= Billaea irrorata =

Scientific classification
- Kingdom: Animalia
- Phylum: Arthropoda
- Class: Insecta
- Order: Diptera
- Family: Tachinidae
- Subfamily: Dexiinae
- Tribe: Dexiini
- Genus: Billaea
- Species: B. irrorata

Binomial name
- Billaea irrorata (Meigen, 1826)

Synonyms
- Arenia volucris Robineau-Desvoidy, 1863; Billaea dubiosa Belanovsky, 1951; Billaea stackelbergi Kolomiets, 1966; Brachycoma smerinthi Meade, 1892; Dexia irrorata Meigen, 1826; Nicaea palpata Robineau-Desvoidy, 1863; Oodigaster distantipennis Macquart, 1854; Phorostoma parvula Portschinsky, 1881; Tachina defecta Walker, 1853

Species of fly

Billaea irrorata is a species of fly in the family Tachinidae.

== Distribution ==
British Isles, Belarus, Czech Republic, Estonia, Hungary, Latvia, Poland, Romania, Slovakia, Ukraine, Denmark, Finland, Sweden, Bulgaria, Greece, Italy, Serbia, Slovenia, Spain, Turkey, Austria, Belgium, France, Germany, Netherlands, Switzerland, Russia.
