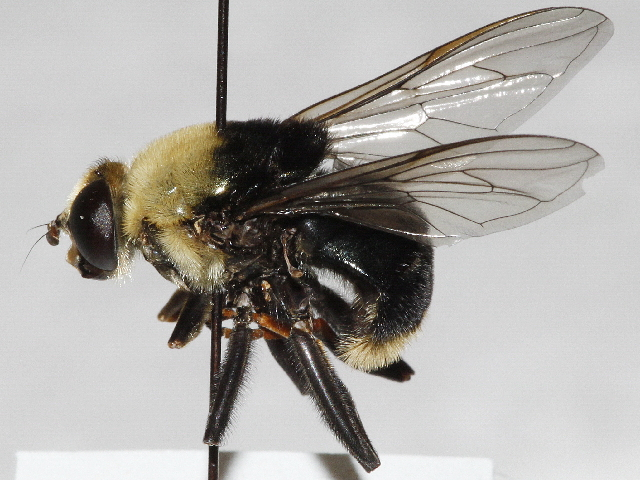

Scientific classification
- Kingdom: Animalia
- Phylum: Arthropoda
- Class: Insecta
- Order: Diptera
- Family: Syrphidae
- Subfamily: Eristalinae
- Tribe: Milesiini
- Subtribe: Xylotina
- Genus: Hadromyia; Williston, 1882

Type species
- Hadromyia grandis Williston, 1882

Synonyms
- Chrysosomidia Curran, 1934

= Hadromyia =

Genus of flies

Hadromyia is a genus of hoverflies in the family Syrphidae. There are about seven described species in Hadromyia.

== Species ==
Subgenus Chrysosomidia Curran, 1934

- H. aepalius (Walker, 1849)
- H. aldrichi (Shannon, 1916)
- H. cimbiciformis (Portschinsky, 1879)
- H. crawfordi (Shannon, 1916)
- H. opaca (Shannon, 1916)
- H. pulchra (Williston, 1882)

Subgenus Hadromyia (Williston, 1882)

- H. grandis Williston, 1882
