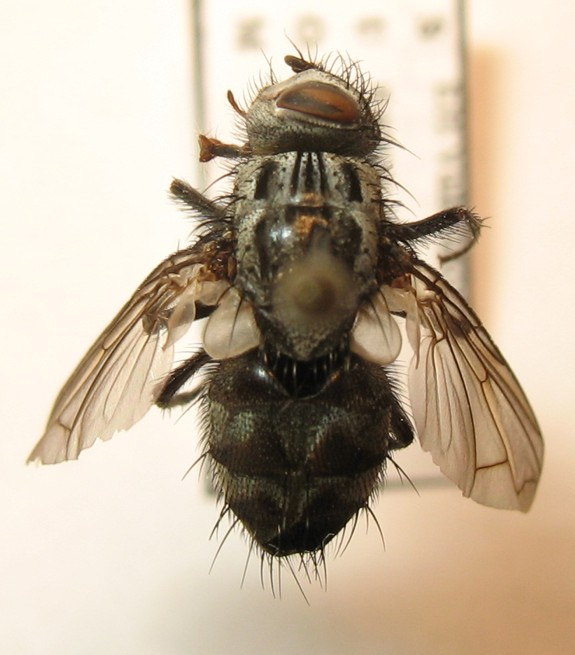
- Billaea triangulifera

Scientific classification
- Kingdom: Animalia
- Phylum: Arthropoda
- Class: Insecta
- Order: Diptera
- Family: Tachinidae
- Subfamily: Dexiinae
- Tribe: Dexiini
- Genus: Billaea
- Species: B. triangulifera

Binomial name
- Billaea triangulifera (Zetterstedt, 1844)

Synonyms
- Asbella ruficornis Robineau-Desvoidy, 1863; Billaea trigonota Kolomiets, 1966; Billaea tsherepanovi Kolomiets, 1966; Dexia triangulifera Zetterstedt, 1844

= Billaea triangulifera =

Species of fly

Billaea triangulifera is a species of fly in the family Tachinidae. It is a parasitoid of larval Prionus coriarius beetles, piercing the beetle near its spiracles.

== Distribution ==
Belarus, Czech Republic, Estonia, Hungary, Poland, Romania, Slovakia, Ukraine, Denmark, Finland, Norway, Sweden, Bulgaria, Italy, Serbia, Austria, Belgium, France, Germany, Switzerland, Japan, Russia, Transcaucasia, China
