= Billaea adelpha =

Scientific classification
- Kingdom: Animalia
- Phylum: Arthropoda
- Class: Insecta
- Order: Diptera
- Family: Tachinidae
- Subfamily: Dexiinae
- Tribe: Dexiini
- Genus: Billaea
- Species: B. adelpha

Binomial name
- Billaea adelpha (Loew, 1873)

Synonyms
- Billaea caucasica Kolomiets, 1966; Billaea mesnili Kolomiets, 1966; Billaea uralensis Kolomiets, 1966; Phorostoma adelpha Loew, 1873; Phorostoma macrophthalma Loew, 1873; Phorostoma nigrofasciata Portschinsky, 1879

Species of fly

Billaea adelpha is a species of fly in the family Tachinidae.

== Distribution ==
Czech Republic, Hungary, Poland, Romania, Slovakia, Ukraine, Bosnia and Herzegovina, Bulgaria, Croatia, Cyprus, Greece, Italy, Portugal, Serbia, Slovenia, Spain, Turkey, Austria, France, Germany, Switzerland, Kazakhstan, Israel, Russia, Transcaucasia.
