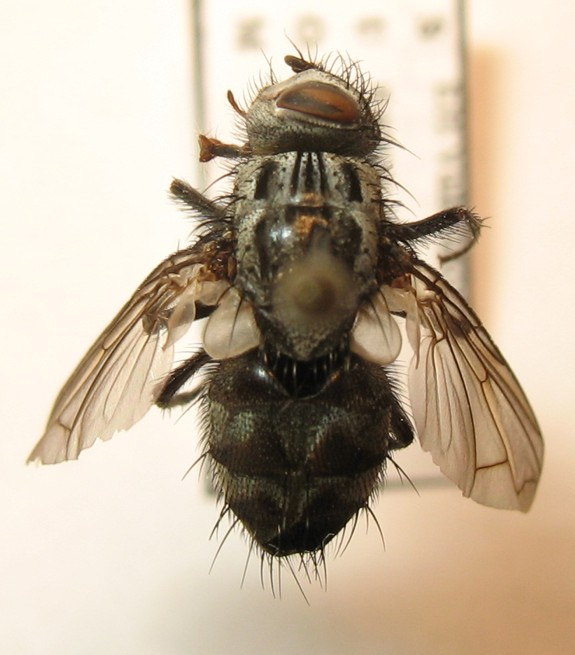
- Billaea triangulifera

Scientific classification
- Kingdom: Animalia
- Phylum: Arthropoda
- Clade: Pancrustacea
- Class: Insecta
- Order: Diptera
- Family: Tachinidae
- Subfamily: Dexiinae
- Tribe: Dexiini
- Genus: Billaea; Robineau-Desvoidy, 1830

Synonyms
- Amphiboliopsis Townsend, 1926; Arenia Robineau-Desvoidy, 1863; Asbella Robineau-Desvoidy, 1863; Atropidomyia Brauer & von Berganstamm, 1889; Bathytheresia Townsend, 1928; Billea Rondani, 1862; Chaetobillaea Mesnil, 1976; Eutheresia Townsend, 1912; Gigamyia Macquart, 1843; Gigantomyia Agassiz, 1846; Gymnobasis Brauer & von Berganstamm, 1889; Gymnodexia Brauer & von Berganstamm, 1891; Homalogaster Agassiz, 1846; Homalostoma Bezzi & Stein, 1907; Homalostoma Brauer & von Berganstamm, 1889; Homalostoma Scudder, 1882; Myxodexia Brauer, 1893; Nicaea Robineau-Desvoidy, 1863; Nicea Marshall, 1873; Omalogaster Macquart, 1834; Omalostoma Rondani, 1862; Parabillaea Blanchard, 1937; Paraprosena Brauer & von Berganstamm, 1889; Paratheresia Townsend, 1915; Philotrichostylum Townsend, 1933; Rhynchodinera Brauer & von Berganstamm, 1889; Sarcoprosena Townsend, 1927; Sardiocera Brauer & von Berganstamm, 1889; Schistostephana Townsend, 1919; Sirostoma Rondani, 1862; Theresia Robineau-Desvoidy, 1830; Theresiopsis Townsend, 1916; Tropidomyia Brauer & von Berganstamm, 1889

= Billaea =

Genus of flies

Billaea is a genus of flies in the family Tachinidae. Most larvae, where known are parasitoids of Coleoptera (Cerambycidae, Lucanidae) or Lepidoptera (Pyralidae)

== Species ==
- Billaea adelpha (Loew, 1873)
- Billaea africana (Villeneuve, 1935)
- Billaea argentaurea (Townsend, 1939)
- Billaea atkinsoni (Baranov, 1934)
- Billaea aurifrons (Townsend, 1919)
- Billaea biserialis (Portschinsky, 1881)
- Billaea brasiliensis (Townsend, 1917)
- Billaea brevicauda Zhang & Shima, 2015
- Billaea capensis Emden, 1947
- Billaea cerambycivora (Guimarães, 1977)
- Billaea chinensis Zhang & Shima, 2015
- Billaea claripalpis (Wulp, 1896)
- Billaea communis Mesnil, 1976
- Billaea decisa (Curran, 1927)
- Billaea edwardsi (Emden, 1947)
- Billaea erecta (Aldrich, 1934)
- Billaea ficorum (Townsend, 1916)
- Billaea flava Zhang & Shima, 2015
- Billaea fortis (Rondani, 1862)
- Billaea friburgensis (Guimarães, 1977)
- Billaea giacomeli (Guimarães, 1977)
- Billaea gigantea (Wiedemann, 1824)
- Billaea grandis Mesnil, 1976
- Billaea impigra Kolomiets, 1966
- Billaea intermedia (Portschinsky, 1881)
- Billaea interrupta (Curran, 1927)
- Billaea irrorata (Meigen, 1826)
- Billaea kolomyetzi Mesnil, 1970
- Billaea kosterae (Guimarães, 1977)
- Billaea kurahashii Zhang & Shima, 2015
- Billaea lata (Macquart, 1847)
- Billaea lateralis (Curran, 1927)
- Billaea lativentris Emden, 1947
- Billaea luteola (Cortés & Campos, 1974)
- Billaea malayana Malloch, 1929
- Billaea maritima (Schiner, 1861)
- Billaea marmorata (Meigen & Waltl, 1835)
- Billaea menezesi (Guimarães, 1977)
- Billaea micronychia Zhang & Shima, 2015
- Billaea minor (Villeneuve, 1913)
- Billaea monohammi (Townsend, 1912)
- Billaea montana (West, 1924)
- Billaea morosa Mesnil, 1963
- Billaea nipigonensis Curran, 1926
- Billaea orbitalis Emden, 1947
- Billaea ovata Mesnil, 1976
- Billaea papei Zhang & Shima, 2015
- Billaea pectinata (Meigen, 1826)
- Billaea plaumanni (Guimarães, 1977)
- Billaea quadrinota Kolomiets, 1966
- Billaea rhingiaeformis Emden, 1959
- Billaea rhynchophorae (Blanchard, 1937)
- Billaea robusta Malloch, 1935
- Billaea rubens (Wiedemann, 1830)
- Billaea rubida O'Hara & Cerretti, 2016
- Billaea rufescens O'Hara & Wood, 2021
- Billaea rufiventris (Townsend, 1929)
- Billaea rutilans (Fabricius, 1781)
- Billaea satisfacta (West, 1925)
- Billaea setigera Zhang & Shima, 2015
- Billaea setosa (Macquart, 1844)
- Billaea shannoni (Guimarães, 1977)
- Billaea sibleyi (West, 1925)
- Billaea sjostedti Speiser, 1910
- Billaea solivaga Mesnil, 1976
- Billaea steini (Brauer & von Berganstamm, 1891)
- Billaea triangulifera (Zetterstedt, 1844)
- Billaea triquetrus O'Hara & Wood, 2021
- Billaea trivittata (Curran, 1929)
- Billaea trochanterata Mesnil, 1970
- Billaea vanemdeni Fennah, 1959
- Billaea velutina Mesnil, 1976
- Billaea versicolor (Curran, 1927)
- Billaea verticalis Zhang & Shima, 2015
- Billaea villeneuvei (Curran, 1927)
- Billaea vitripennis Mesnil, 1950
- Billaea yintiaoling Zhang, 2023
- Billaea zimini Kolomiets, 1966
