= Hadromyia aepalius =

Scientific classification
- Kingdom: Animalia
- Phylum: Arthropoda
- Class: Insecta
- Order: Diptera
- Family: Syrphidae
- Tribe: Milesiini
- Subtribe: Xylotina
- Genus: Hadromyia
- Subgenus: Chrysosomidia
- Species: H. aepalius

Binomial name
- Hadromyia aepalius (Walker, 1849)

Synonyms
- Xylota aepalius Walker, 1849; Brachypalpus sorosis Williston, 1887

Species of fly

Hadromyia aepalius (Walker, 1849), the Sterling Quicksilver, is a rare species of syrphid fly found in eastern North America. Hoverflies get their names from the ability to remain nearly motionless while in flight. The adults are also known as flower flies for they are commonly found around and on flowers, from which they get both energy-giving nectar and protein-rich pollen.

== Description ==
For terms see Morphology of Diptera.
external image

Head

The frontal triangle and face are yellow The gena are black. The antennae are yellowish red.

Thorax

The scutum is shining metallic bronze, with erect, rather abundant light yellow pile. The humeri are yellowish red. The pleurae are black, in the middle with light yellow pile. The scutellum is colored like the scutum.

Abdomen

The abdomen on the dorsum is shining metallic bronze (see the common name), with opaque black cross-bands. The first segment is black in front. The second segment has a broad band in front, and another, a crescentric one (the broadest) behind. The third segment has a slender band one on the anterior margin, behind the middle there is another narrow anteriorly arcuate band. The light yellow abdominal pile is erect and rather abundant.

Wings

The wings have brown in front and are subhyaline behind. The apical cross-vein joins the third longitudinal vein R4+5 with a shorter spur vein. The marginal (r1) and submarginal (r2+3) cells are both open at the wing margin.

Legs

The legs, including the coxa are reddish yellow, with nearly white pile. The tip of tarsi are blackish.

<

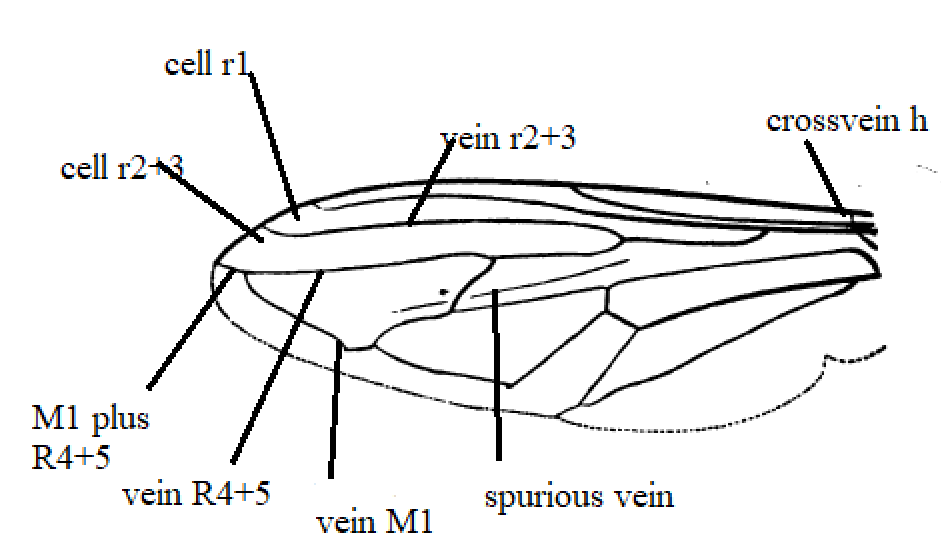
hadromyia wing diagram

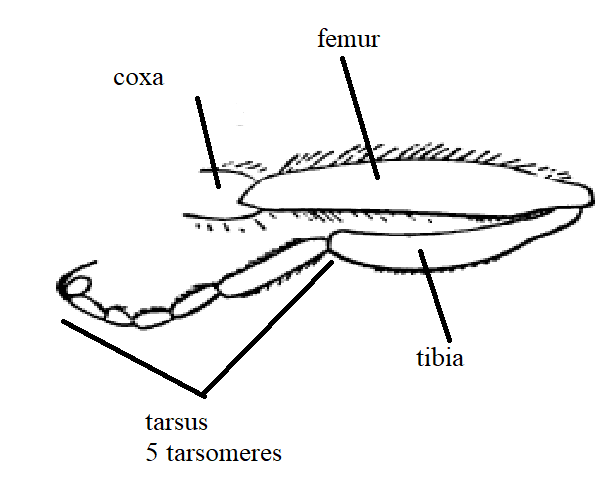
hadromyia leg diagram

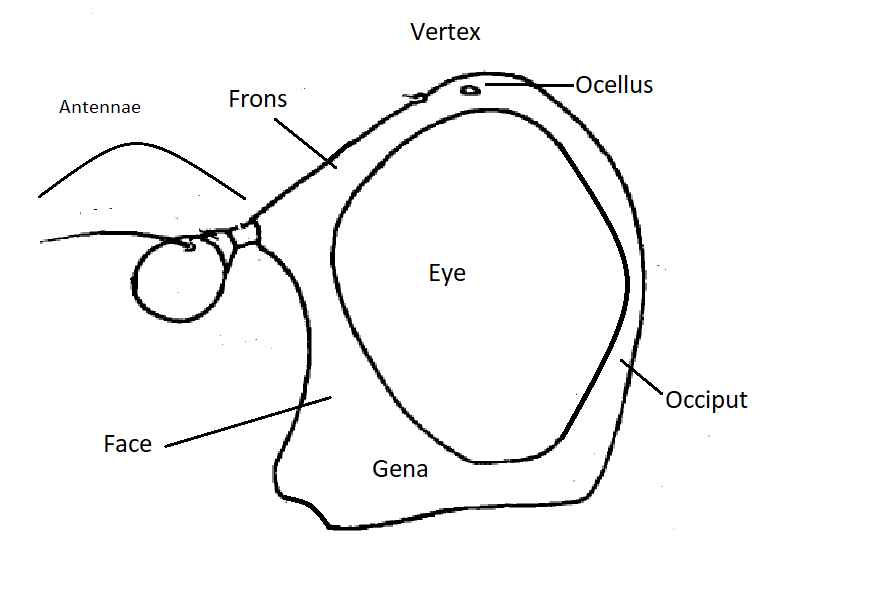
profile syrphid head

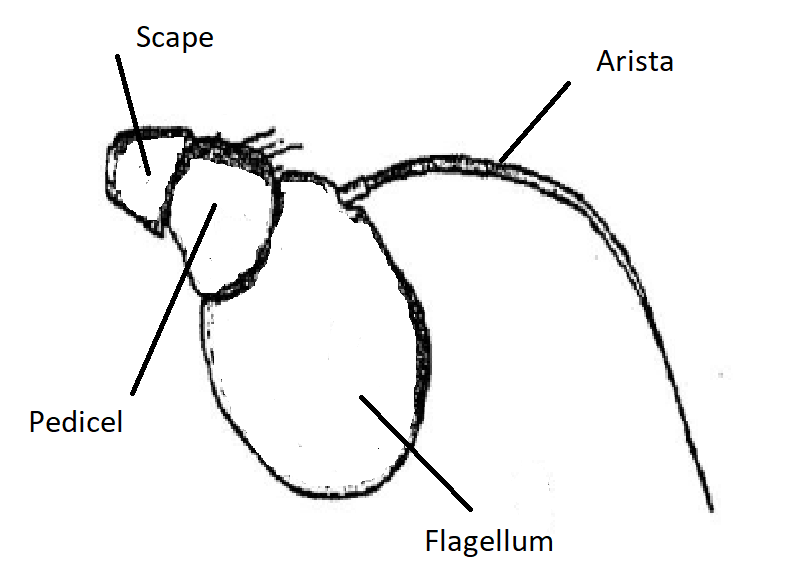
Antenna syrphid

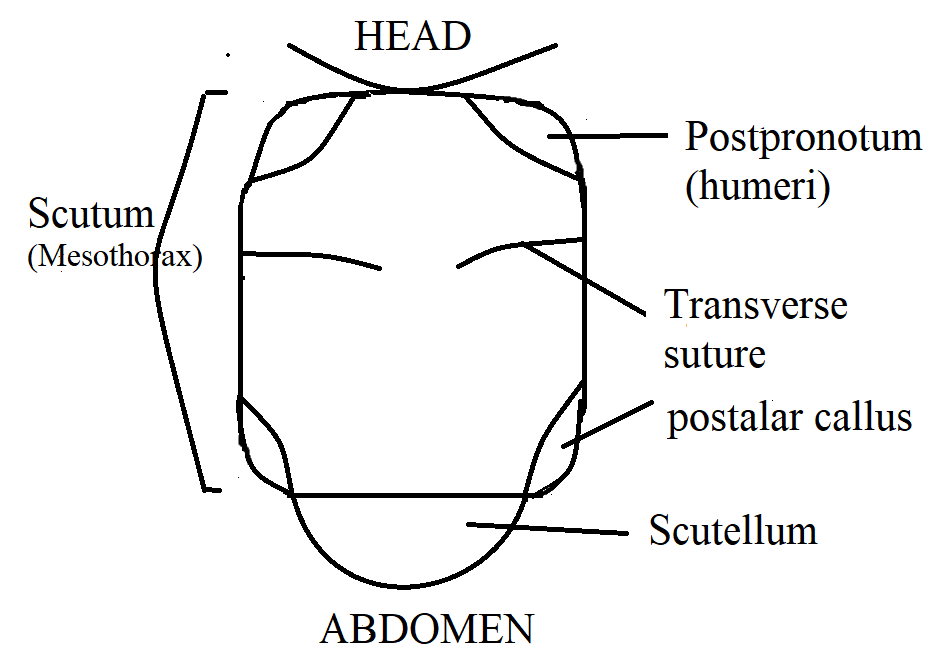
dorsal view of Syrphid thorax

Hadromyia aepalius is a species of hoverfly in the family Syrphidae.

== Distribution ==
Canada, United States.
