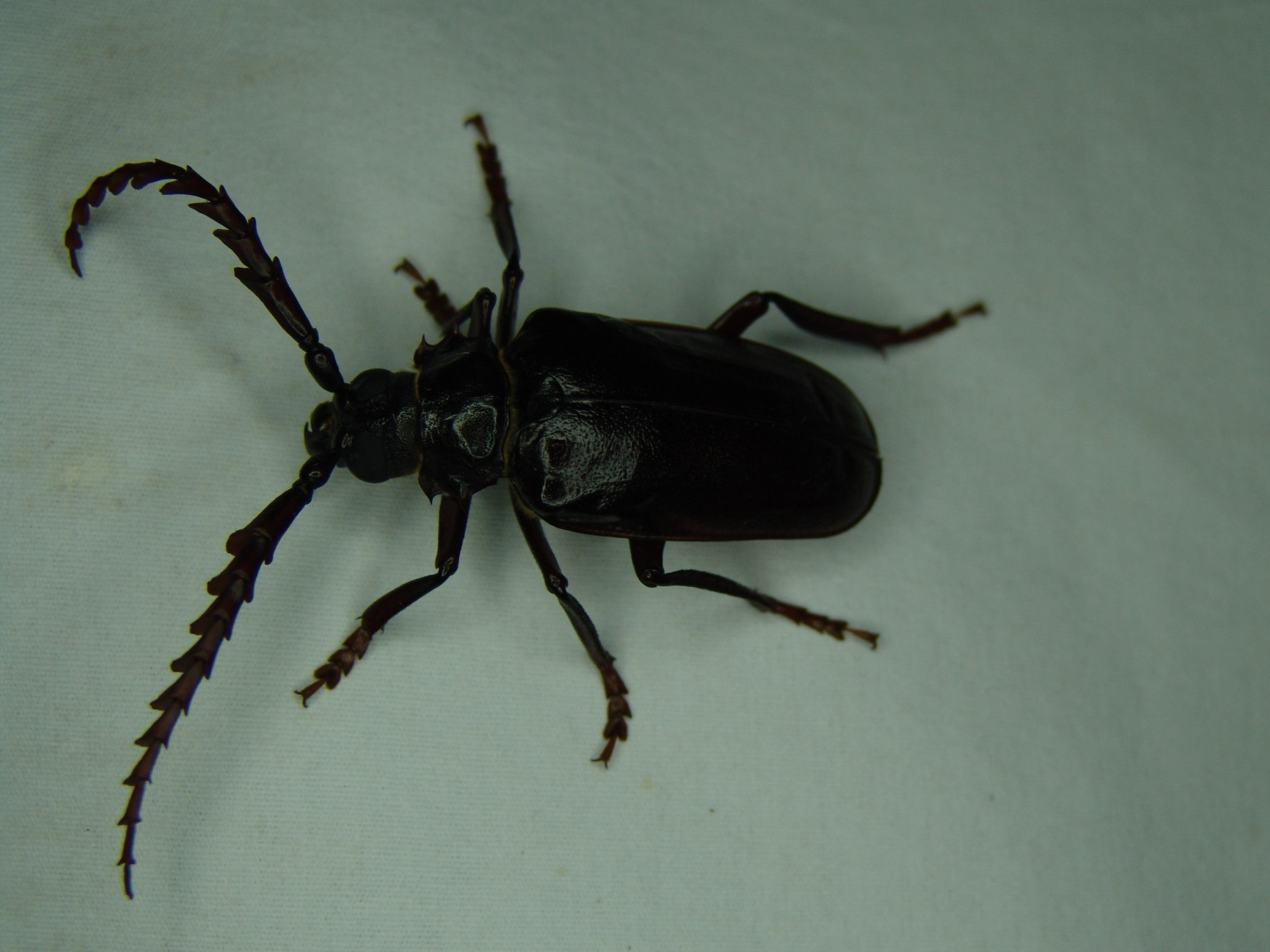

Scientific classification
- Domain: Eukaryota
- Kingdom: Animalia
- Phylum: Arthropoda
- Class: Insecta
- Order: Coleoptera
- Suborder: Polyphaga
- Infraorder: Cucujiformia
- Family: Cerambycidae
- Genus: Prionus
- Species: P. heroicus

Binomial name
- Prionus heroicus Semenov, 1907

Synonyms
- Prionus fontinalis Casey, 1924; Prionus tetricus Casey, 1912; Prionus tristis Casey, 1912; Prionus tumidus Casey, 1912; Prionus vastus Casey, 1912

= Prionus heroicus =

Species of beetle

Prionus heroicus is a species of long-horned beetle in the family Cerambycidae. It is found in North America.
