= Billaea pectinata =

Scientific classification
- Kingdom: Animalia
- Phylum: Arthropoda
- Class: Insecta
- Order: Diptera
- Family: Tachinidae
- Subfamily: Dexiinae
- Tribe: Dexiini
- Genus: Billaea
- Species: B. pectinata

Binomial name
- Billaea pectinata (Meigen, 1826)

Synonyms
- Billaea brevipulvilla Kolomiets, 1966; Billaea carinata Kolomiets, 1966; Billaea grisea Robineau-Desvoidy, 1830; Dexia lata Egger, 1856; Dexia pectinata Meigen, 1826

Species of fly

Billaea pectinata is a species of fly in the family Tachinidae.

== Distribution ==
Tajikistan, Czech Republic, Hungary, Poland, Romania, Slovakia, Ukraine, Bosnia and Herzegovina, Bulgaria, Croatia, Greece, Italy, Serbia, Spain, Austria, France, Germany, Switzerland, Israel, Palestine, Russia, Transcaucasia.
