= Billaea zimini =

Scientific classification
- Kingdom: Animalia
- Phylum: Arthropoda
- Class: Insecta
- Order: Diptera
- Family: Tachinidae
- Subfamily: Dexiinae
- Tribe: Dexiini
- Genus: Billaea
- Species: B. zimini

Binomial name
- Billaea zimini Kolomiets, 1966

Species of fly

Billaea zimini is a species of fly in the family Tachinidae.

== Distribution ==
Turkmenistan, Iran.
