= Billaea impigra =

Scientific classification
- Kingdom: Animalia
- Phylum: Arthropoda
- Class: Insecta
- Order: Diptera
- Family: Tachinidae
- Subfamily: Dexiinae
- Tribe: Dexiini
- Genus: Billaea
- Species: B. impigra

Binomial name
- Billaea impigra Kolomiets, 1966

Species of fly

Billaea impigra is a species of fly in the family Tachinidae.

== Distribution ==
Russia, China.
