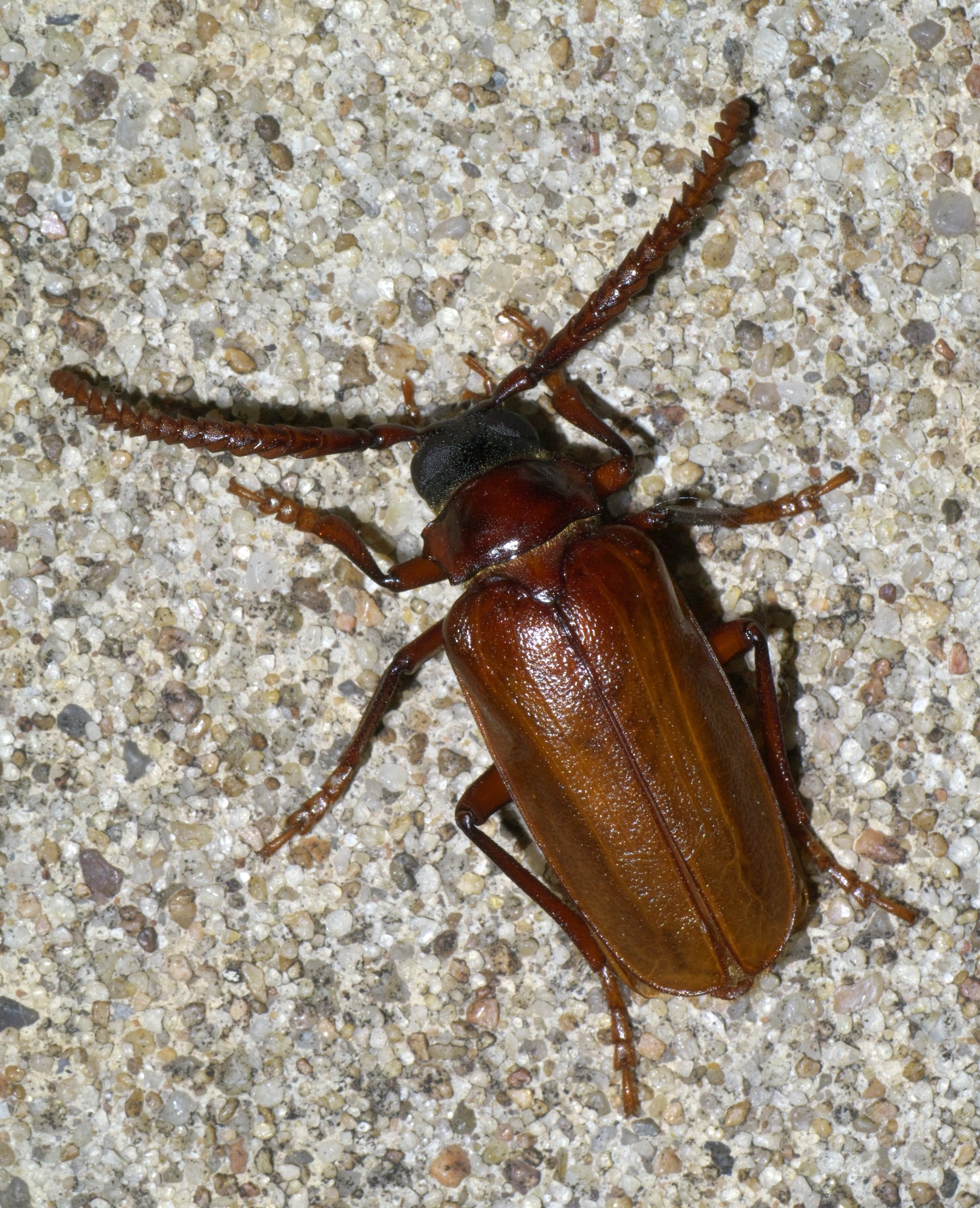
- Prionus debilis, Oklahoma

Scientific classification
- Kingdom: Animalia
- Phylum: Arthropoda
- Class: Insecta
- Order: Coleoptera
- Suborder: Polyphaga
- Infraorder: Cucujiformia
- Family: Cerambycidae
- Genus: Prionus
- Species: P. debilis

Binomial name
- Prionus debilis Casey, 1891

= Prionus debilis =

Species of beetle

Prionus debilis is a species of long-horned beetle in the family Cerambycidae. It is found in North America.
