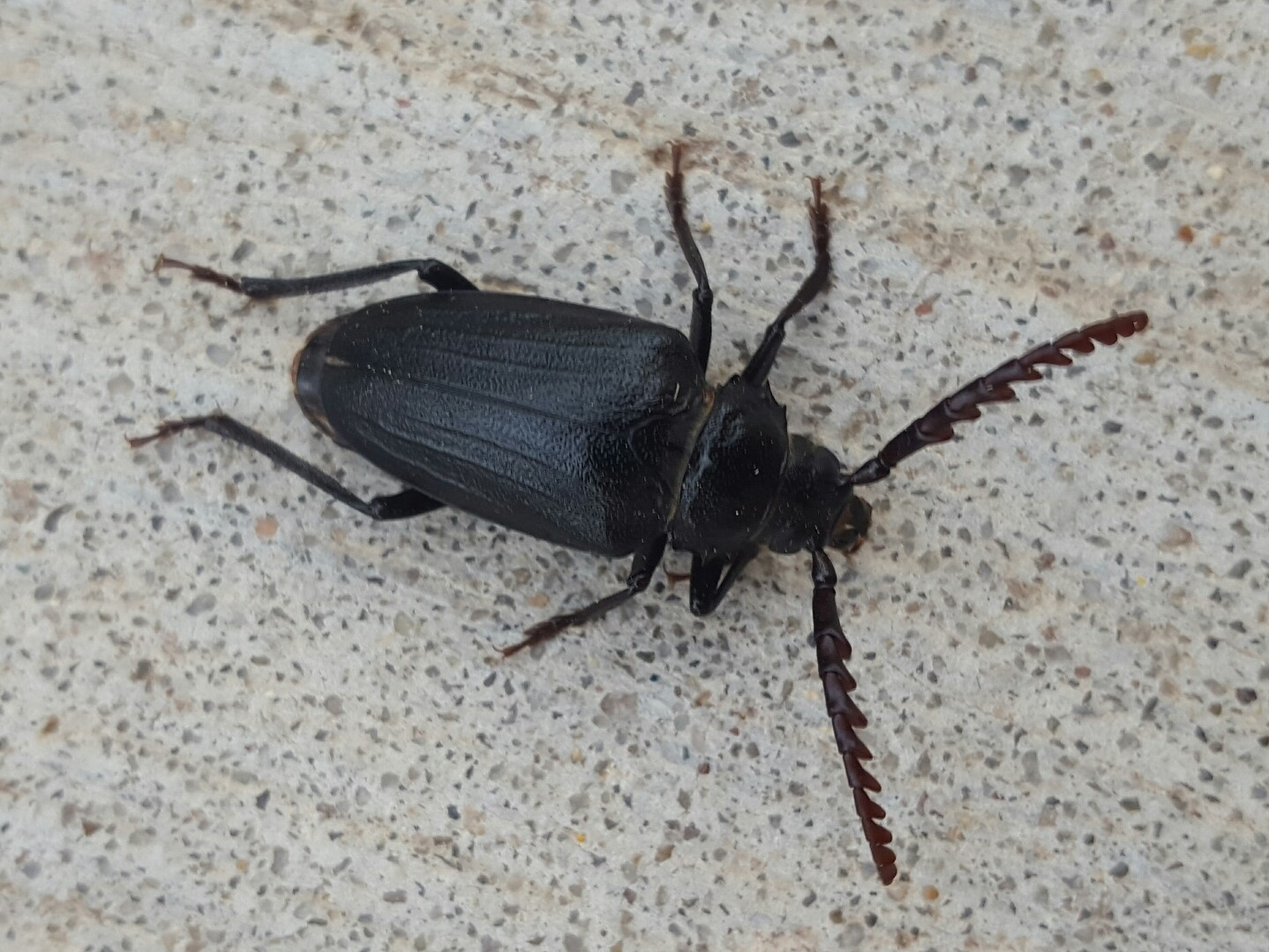

Scientific classification
- Domain: Eukaryota
- Kingdom: Animalia
- Phylum: Arthropoda
- Class: Insecta
- Order: Coleoptera
- Suborder: Polyphaga
- Infraorder: Cucujiformia
- Family: Cerambycidae
- Genus: Prionus
- Species: P. integer

Binomial name
- Prionus integer LeConte, 1851

= Prionus integer =

Species of beetle

Prionus integer is a species of long-horned beetle in the family Cerambycidae. It is endemic to the United States.
