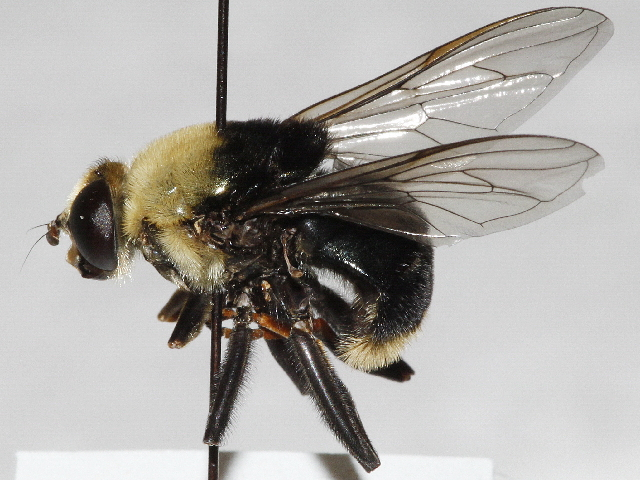

Scientific classification
- Kingdom: Animalia
- Phylum: Arthropoda
- Class: Insecta
- Order: Diptera
- Family: Syrphidae
- Subfamily: Eristalinae
- Tribe: Milesiini
- Subtribe: Xylotina
- Genus: Hadromyia
- Species: H. grandis

Binomial name
- Hadromyia grandis (Williston, 1882)

Synonyms
- Brachypalpus grandis Williston, 1882; Brachypalpus morissoni Bigot, 1884

= Hadromyia grandis =

Species of fly

Hadromyia grandis is a species of hoverfly in the family Syrphidae.

== Distribution ==
Canada, United States.
