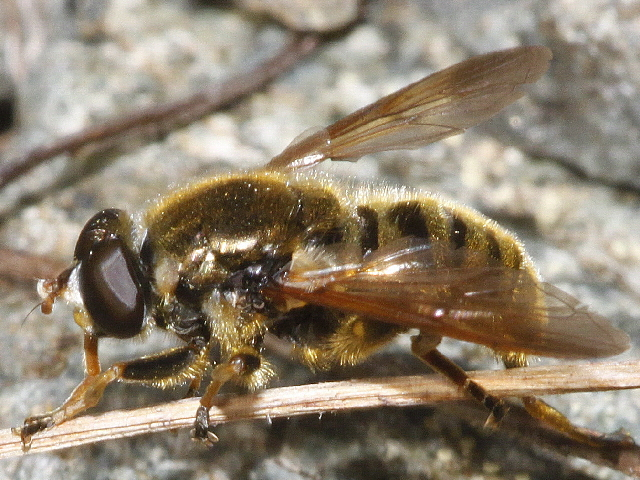

Scientific classification
- Kingdom: Animalia
- Phylum: Arthropoda
- Class: Insecta
- Order: Diptera
- Family: Syrphidae
- Tribe: Milesiini
- Subtribe: Xylotina
- Genus: Hadromyia
- Subgenus: Chrysosomidia
- Species: H. crawfordi

Binomial name
- Hadromyia crawfordi (Shannon, 1916)

Synonyms
- Caliprobola crawfordi Shannon, 1916

= Hadromyia crawfordi =

Species of fly

Hadromyia crawfordi is a species of hoverfly in the family Syrphidae.

== Distribution ==
Canada: British Columbia United States: Washington, Oregon, California Montana, Idaho
