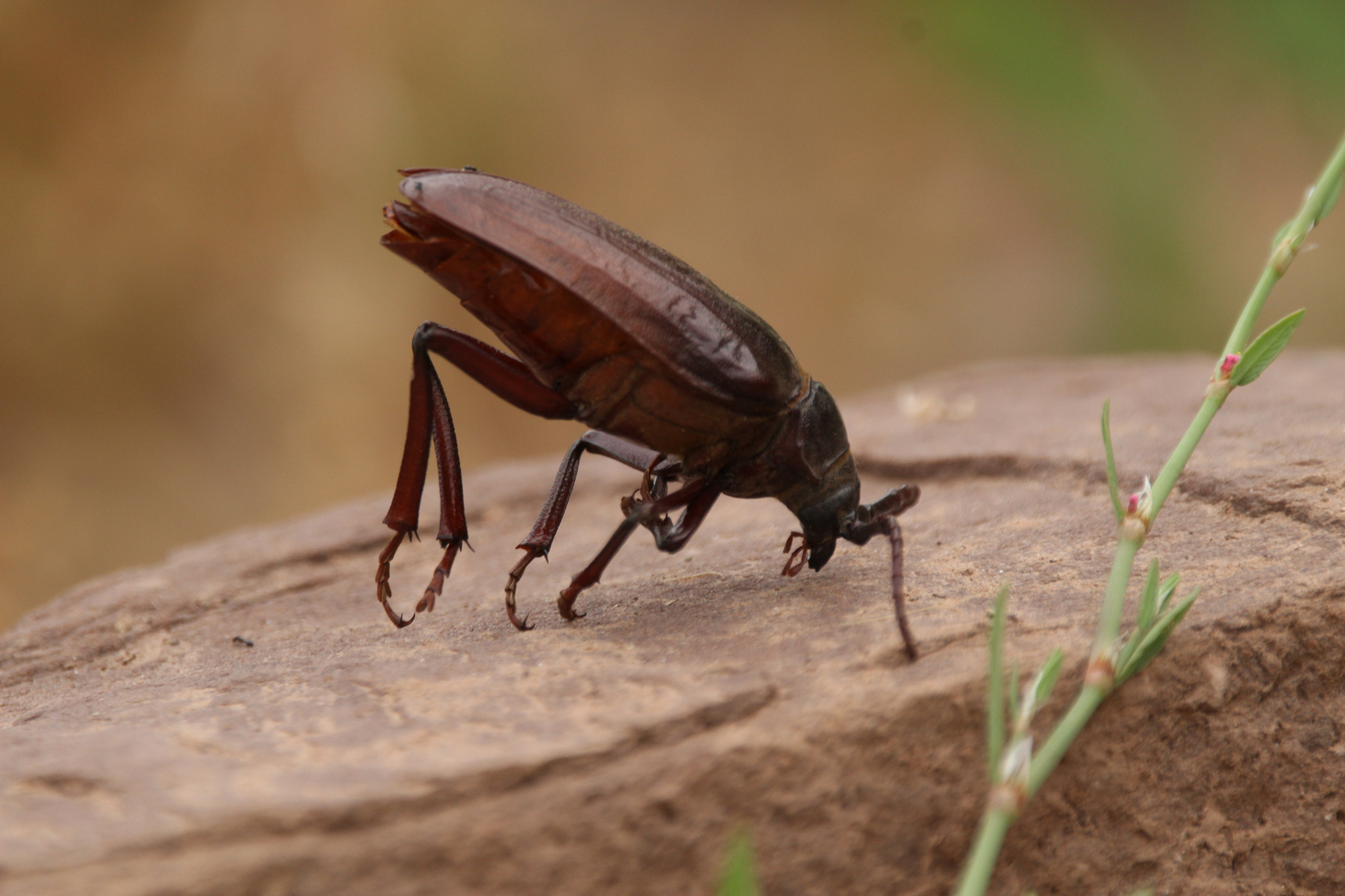
- Adult

Scientific classification
- Kingdom: Animalia
- Phylum: Arthropoda
- Clade: Pancrustacea
- Class: Insecta
- Order: Coleoptera
- Suborder: Polyphaga
- Infraorder: Cucujiformia
- Family: Cerambycidae
- Genus: Prionus
- Species: P. californicus

Binomial name
- Prionus californicus Motschulsky, 1845

= Prionus californicus =

California root borer

Species of beetle

Prionus californicus, commonly known as the California root borer, is a species of insect in the longhorn beetle family (Cerambycidae). It is native to the American west where it is often a pest of orchard and vine crops.

== Distribution ==
The California root borer occurs widely in western North America from Alaska to Mexico. It spends most of its life underground feeding on the roots of most deciduous trees and shrubs, as well as some conifers, brambles, and agricultural crops such as hops and grape vines.

== Description and life cycle ==
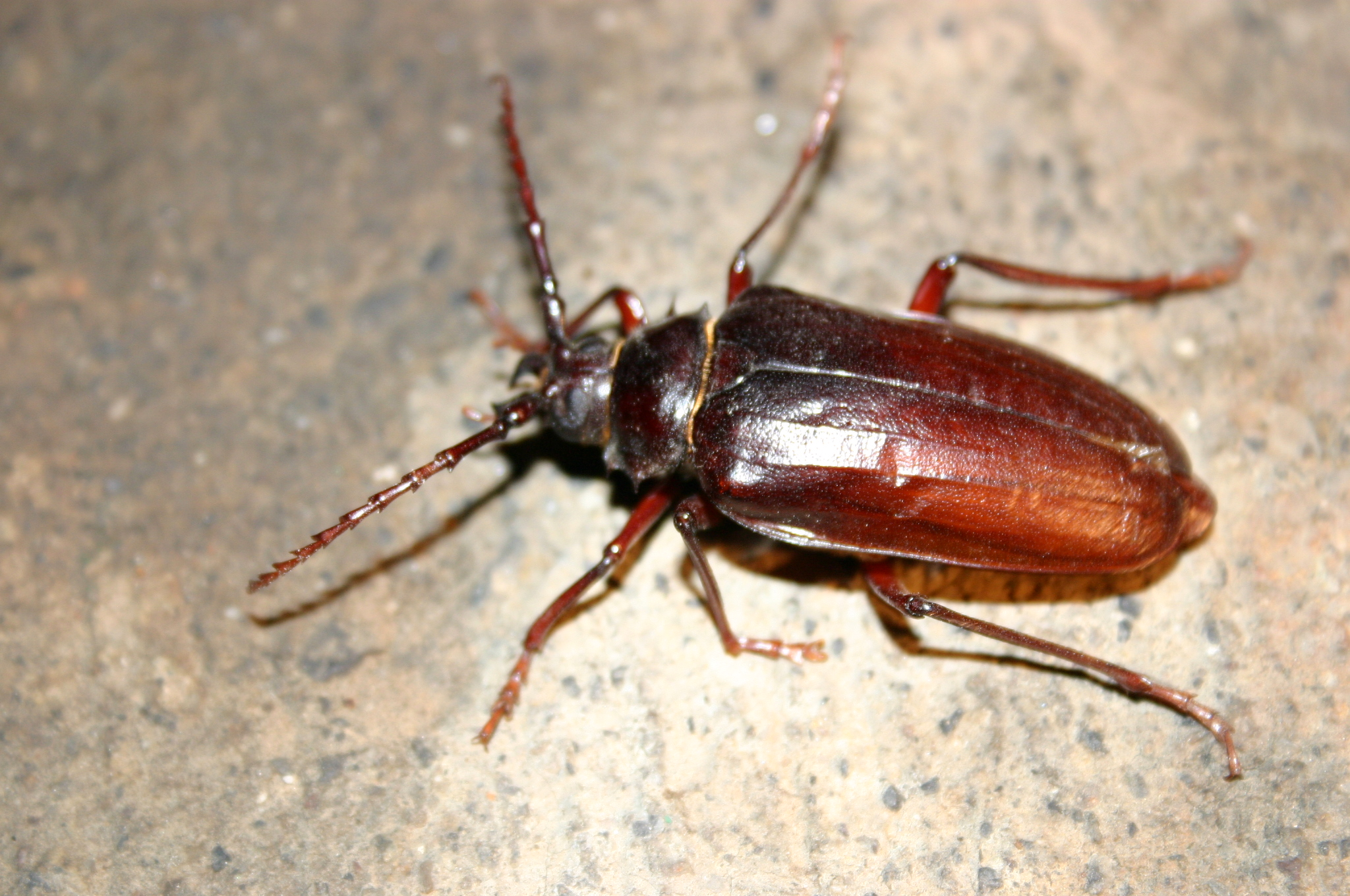
Adult Prionus californicus

The 2.5 to 5.7 cm adults, which are reddish-brown with smooth shiny wing-cases, emerge from the soil from June to early August. The males are smaller than the females and have more strongly serrated antennae. The adults do not feed. They fly at night, seeking mates. Males appear to be more active, while females produce a pheromone to attract males. The female-produced sex pheromone compound has been identified as an isomer of 3,5-dimethyldodecanoic acid. A synthetic mixture of all four possible isomers of 3,5-dimethyldodecanoic acid is highly attractive to male P. californicus in field trials.

The life span of the adult P. californicus is 10 – 20 days. Shortly after mating the female lays cream to yellow-brown 4.8 mm long eggs, of which she can produce up to 200 in her lifetime. She lays them 1.25 to 3.8 cm below the soil surface near the roots of suitable hosts.

The larvae, cream to brown in color and strongly segmented, seek out roots shortly after hatching. They furrow and tunnel through the roots as they consume tissue, moving upward and inward and often killing apical regions. Age distribution data suggests that larvae move from smaller to larger diameter roots as they age and grow from 6.5 mm to 7.6 cm, eventually reaching the root crown.

Pupation occurs near the soil surface in a cell constructed of soil and root material. The 2.5 to 5 cm cream pupa look like the adults.

== Economic significance ==
California root borers are considered an orchard pest. It has become a prominent pest of fruit trees in the Intermountain West region. The tunneling habits of the larvae can cause the death of infested trees. This can be caused directly, through girdling of the root cambium, or indirectly as the weakened host becomes susceptible to disease.

This beetle is recognized as being edible to humans in both its larval and adult stages.

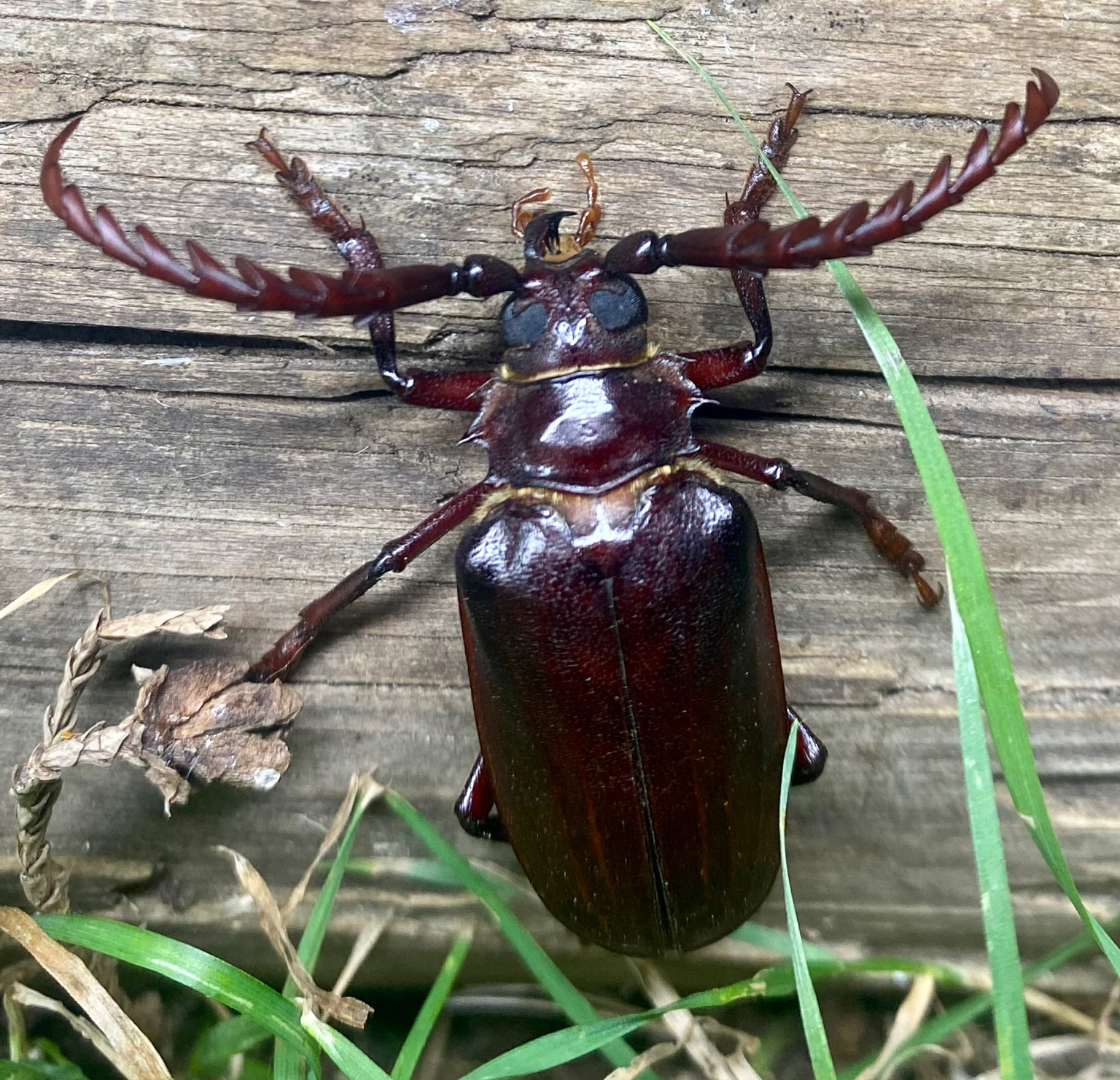
Prionus californicus. Adult Male

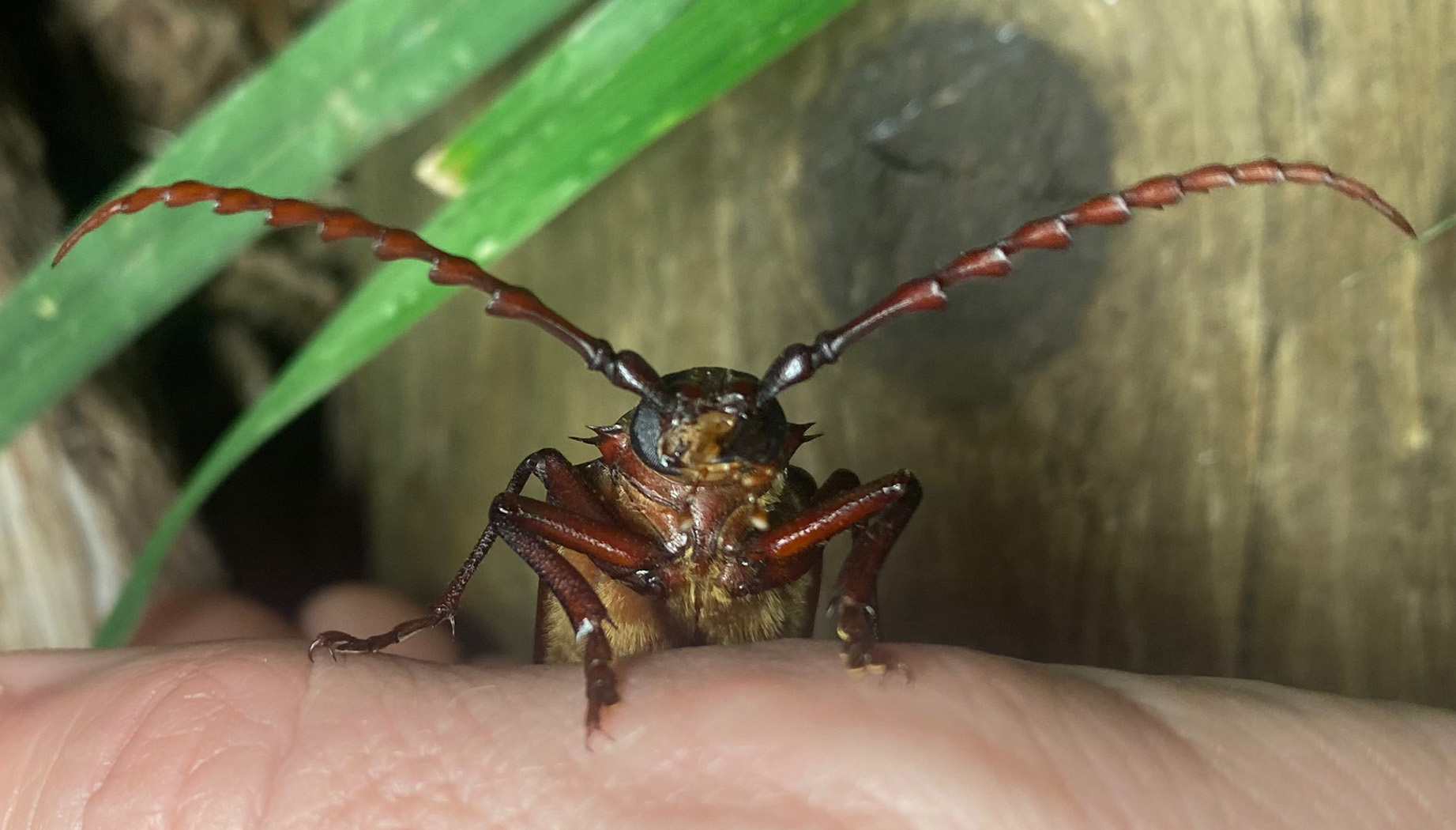
Prionus californicus in Oregon
