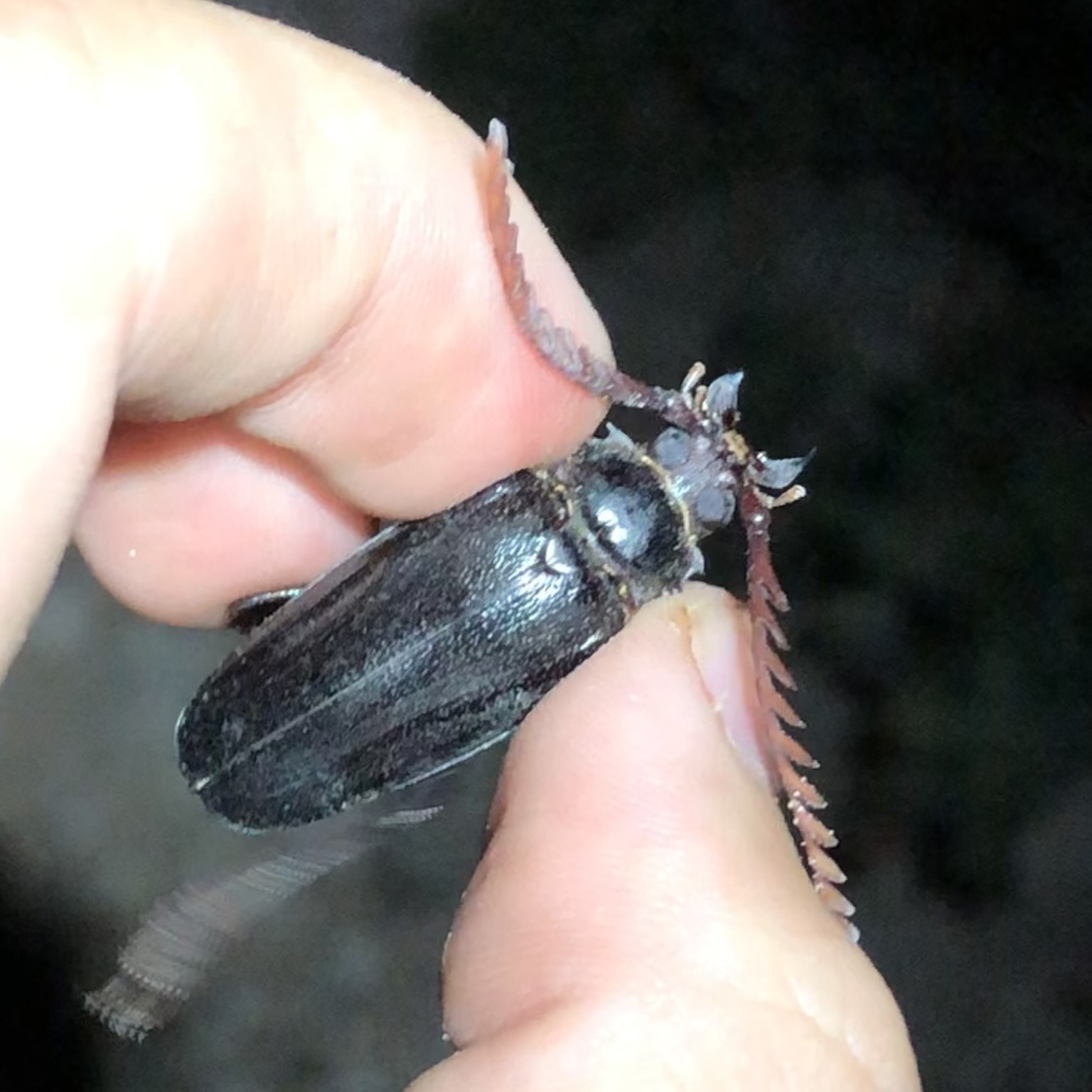

Scientific classification
- Domain: Eukaryota
- Kingdom: Animalia
- Phylum: Arthropoda
- Class: Insecta
- Order: Coleoptera
- Suborder: Polyphaga
- Infraorder: Cucujiformia
- Family: Cerambycidae
- Genus: Prionus
- Species: P. spinipennis

Binomial name
- Prionus spinipennis Hovore & Turnbow, 1984

= Prionus spinipennis =

Species of beetle

Prionus spinipennis is a species of long-horned beetle in the family Cerambycidae. It is found in North America.
