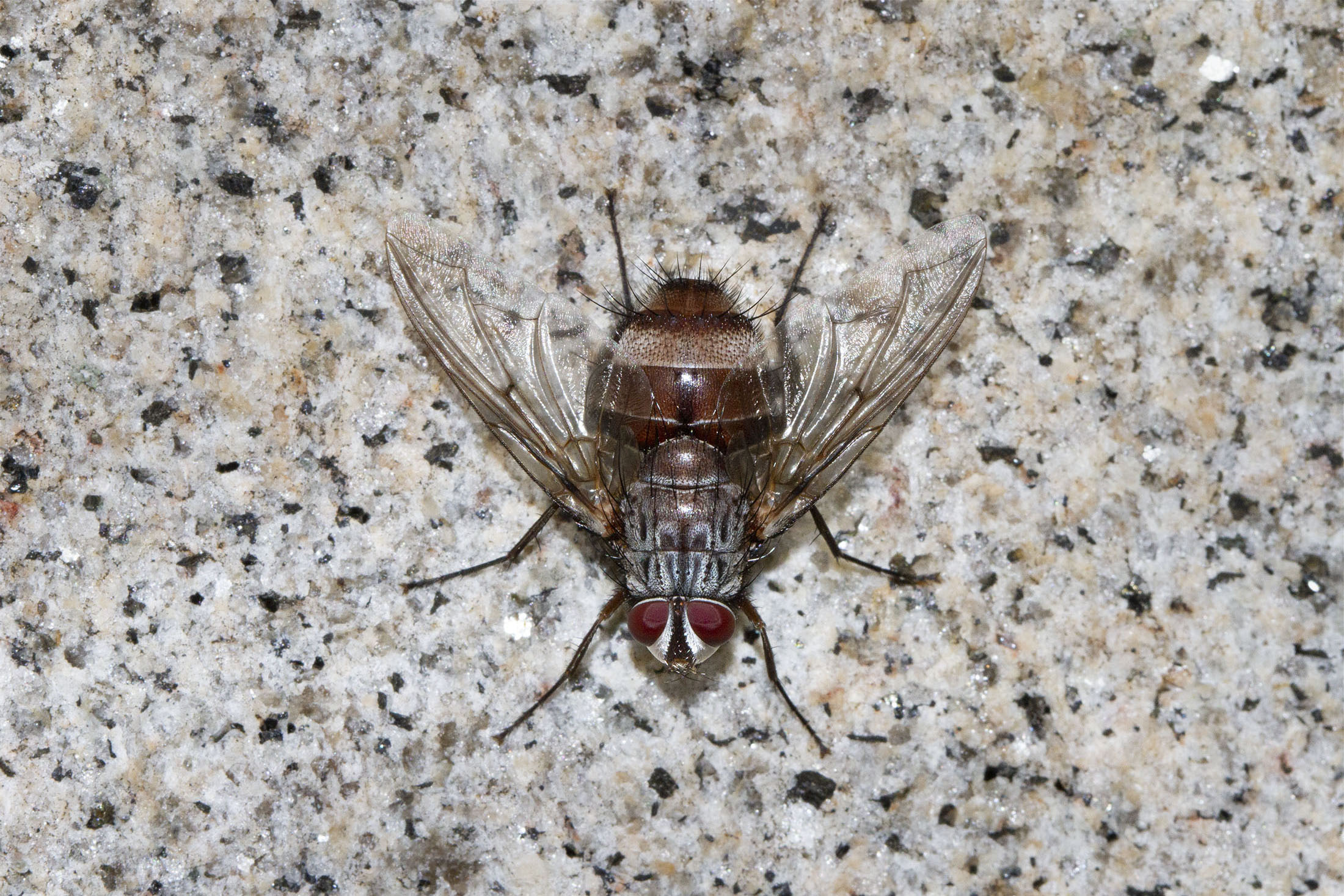
- Billaea rutilans

Scientific classification
- Kingdom: Animalia
- Phylum: Arthropoda
- Class: Insecta
- Order: Diptera
- Family: Tachinidae
- Subfamily: Dexiinae
- Tribe: Dexiini
- Genus: Billaea
- Species: B. rutilans

Binomial name
- Billaea rutilans (Fabricius, 1781)

Synonyms
- Musca rutilans Fabricius, 1781; Musca valida Wiedemann, 1830; Myocera ruficornis Bigot, 1889; Phorostoma melanogaster Bigot, 1889; Sardiocera valida Brauer & von Berganstamm, 1889; Theresia tandrec Robineau-Desvoidy, 1830

= Billaea rutilans =

Species of fly

Billaea rutilans is a species of fly in the family Tachinidae.

== Distribution ==
United States, West Indies.
