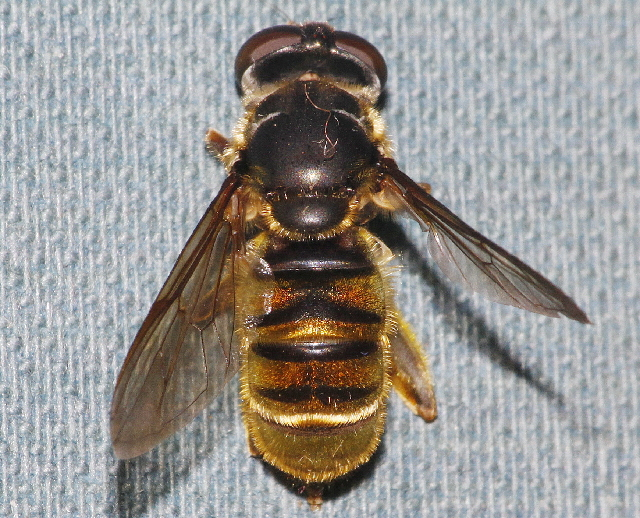

Scientific classification
- Kingdom: Animalia
- Phylum: Arthropoda
- Class: Insecta
- Order: Diptera
- Family: Syrphidae
- Tribe: Milesiini
- Subtribe: Xylotina
- Genus: Hadromyia
- Subgenus: Chrysosomidia
- Species: H. pulchra

Binomial name
- Hadromyia pulchra (Williston, 1882)

Synonyms
- Brachypalpus pulcher Williston, 1882; Calliprobola aerea Bigot, 1884

= Hadromyia pulchra =

Species of fly

Hadromyia pulchra is a species of hoverfly in the family Syrphidae.

== Distribution ==
Canada, United States.
