= Prionus arenarius =

Scientific classification
- Domain: Eukaryota
- Kingdom: Animalia
- Phylum: Arthropoda
- Class: Insecta
- Order: Coleoptera
- Suborder: Polyphaga
- Infraorder: Cucujiformia
- Family: Cerambycidae
- Genus: Prionus
- Species: P. arenarius

Binomial name
- Prionus arenarius Hovore, 1981

Species of beetle

Prionus arenarius is a species of long-horned beetle in the family Cerambycidae. It is found in North America.
