= Billaea maritima =

Scientific classification
- Kingdom: Animalia
- Phylum: Arthropoda
- Class: Insecta
- Order: Diptera
- Family: Tachinidae
- Subfamily: Dexiinae
- Tribe: Dexiini
- Genus: Billaea
- Species: B. maritima

Binomial name
- Billaea maritima (Schiner, 1861)

Synonyms
- Billaea araxana Kolomiets, 1966; Phorostoma maritima Schiner, 1861

Species of fly

Billaea maritima is a species of fly in the family Tachinidae.

== Distribution ==
Hungary, Romania, Bulgaria, Croatia, Cyprus, Italy, Portugal, Serbia, France, Japan, Israel, Palestine, Transcaucasia.
