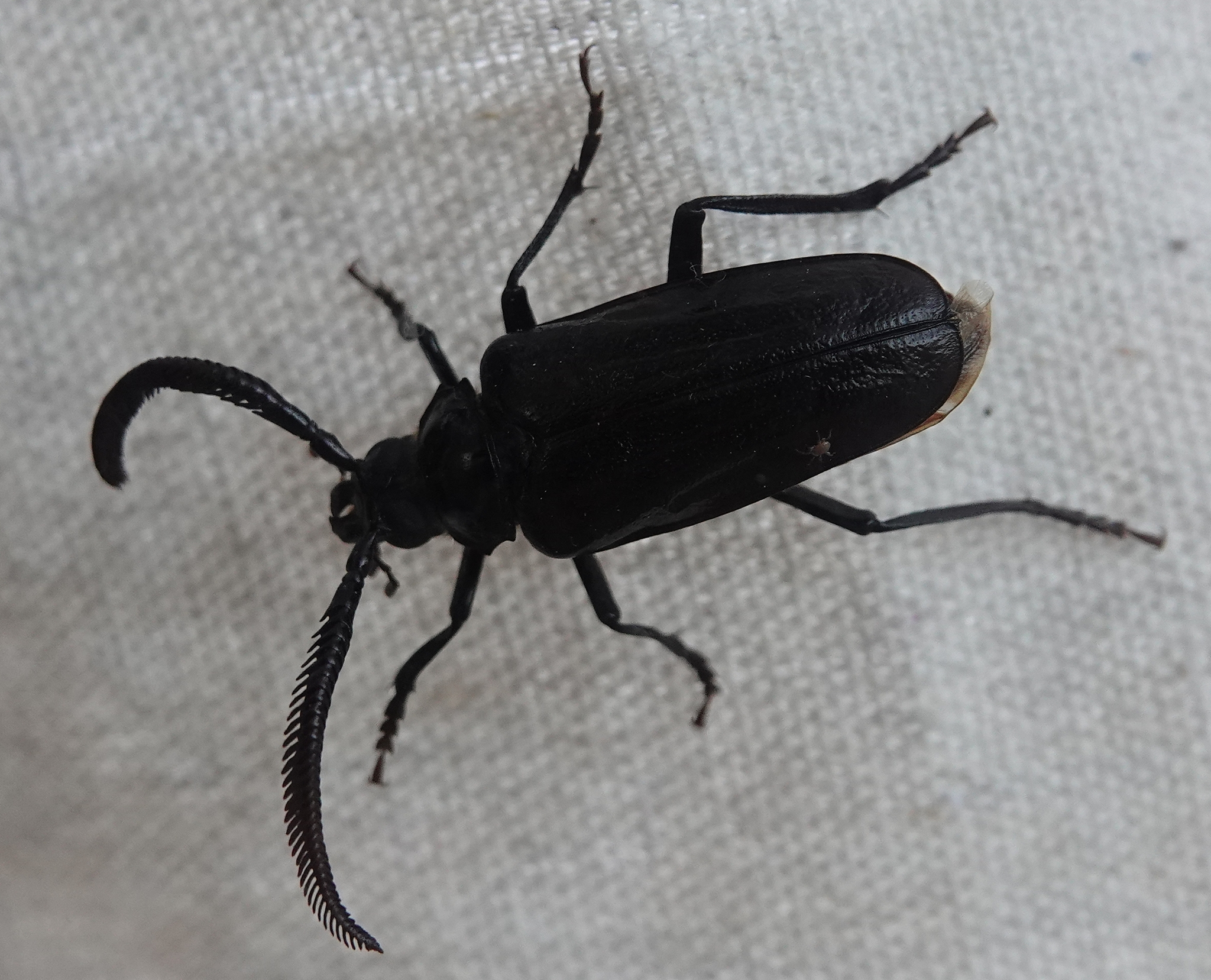

Scientific classification
- Domain: Eukaryota
- Kingdom: Animalia
- Phylum: Arthropoda
- Class: Insecta
- Order: Coleoptera
- Suborder: Polyphaga
- Infraorder: Cucujiformia
- Family: Cerambycidae
- Genus: Prionus
- Species: P. fissicornis

Binomial name
- Prionus fissicornis Haldeman, 1845

Synonyms
- Prionus thoracicus Casey, 1924

= Prionus fissicornis =

Species of beetle

Prionus fissicornis is a species of long-horned beetle in the family Cerambycidae. It is found in North America.
