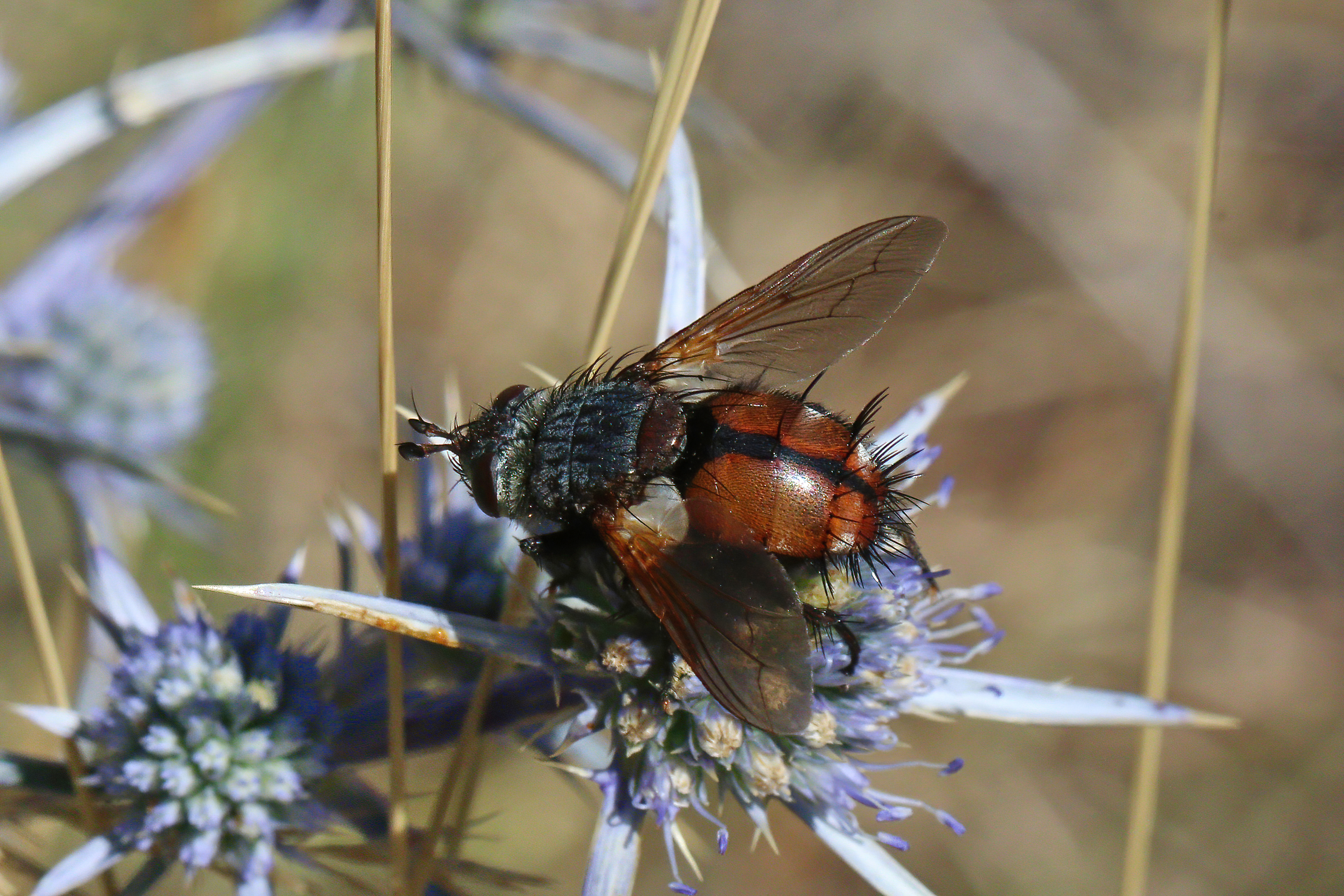
- Peleteria iavana

Scientific classification
- Kingdom: Animalia
- Phylum: Arthropoda
- Class: Insecta
- Order: Diptera
- Family: Tachinidae
- Subfamily: Tachininae
- Tribe: Tachinini
- Genus: Peleteria
- Species: P. iavana

Binomial name
- Peleteria iavana (Wiedemann, 1819)

Synonyms
- Musca varia Fabricius, 1794; Tachina iavana Wiedemann, 1819; Echinomyia argyrocephala Macquart, 1846; Tachina dorsalis Walker, 1853; Echinomyia sarcophagoides Walker, 1861; Cuphocera rufiventris Corti, 1895; Cuphocera hova Villeneuve, 1915; Acuphocera sumatrensis Townsend, 1926

= Peleteria iavana =

Species of fly

Peleteria iavana is a species of bristle fly in the family Tachinidae.

== Distribution ==
China, Belarus, Czech Republic, Hungary, Latvia, Moldova, Poland, Romania, Slovakia, Ukraine, Andorra, Bulgaria, Croatia, Greece, Italy, Macedonia, Portugal, Serbia, Spain, Turkey, Austria, Belgium, Channel Islands, France, Netherlands, Switzerland, Japan, Kazakhstan, South Korea, Israel, Saudi Arabia, Algeria, Russia, Democratic Republic of the Congo, Ethiopia, Kenya, Madagascar, South Africa, Sudan, Tanzania, Zambia, Zimbabwe, India, Borneo, Java, Sulawesi, Sumatra, Malaysia, Myanmar, Nepal, Philippines, Sri Lanka, Taiwan, Thailand, Australia, Papua New Guinea, Solomon Islands.
