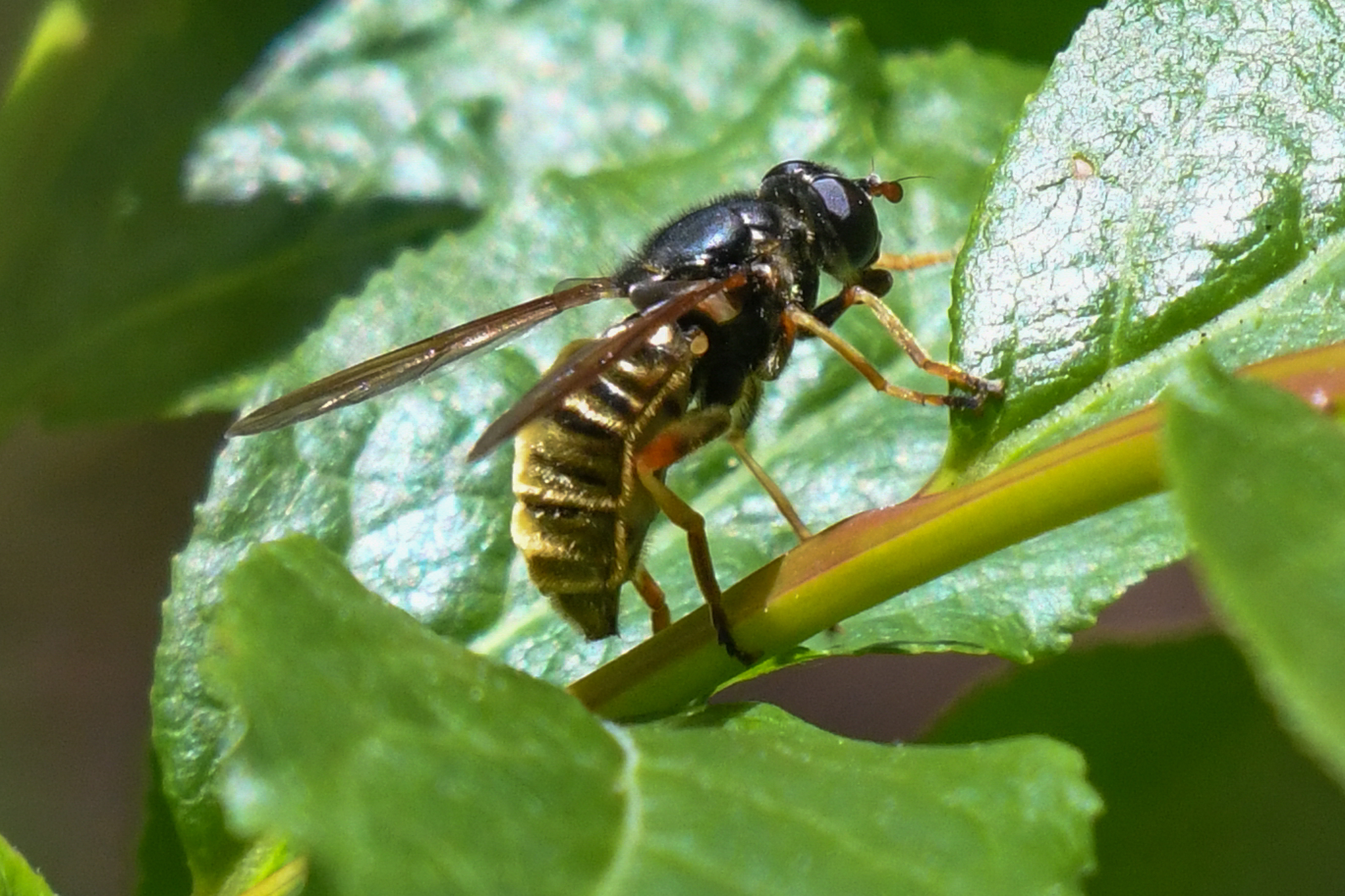

Scientific classification
- Kingdom: Animalia
- Phylum: Arthropoda
- Class: Insecta
- Order: Diptera
- Family: Syrphidae
- Tribe: Milesiini
- Subtribe: Xylotina
- Genus: Hadromyia
- Subgenus: Chrysosomidia
- Species: H. aldrichi

Binomial name
- Hadromyia aldrichi (Shannon, 1916)

Synonyms
- Caliprobola aldrichi Shannon, 1916

= Hadromyia aldrichi =

Species of fly

Hadromyia aldrichi is a species of hoverfly in the family Syrphidae.

== Description ==
"Very similar to opacus but more robust, head obviously broader than high; abdomen brilliant bronze, with the pile more golden. "

"Female: Frons depressed, dull aeneous black, somewhat reddish above antennae, with dark brown pile and very narrow whitish pollinose stripes along eyes. Dorsum of thorax sub-shining black, with dark brown pile; meso-pleurae with rather long golden pile; posterior margin of scutellum and post-alar calli with yellow pile. Abdomen banded similarly to opacus. Fore femora dark on outer side, yellow on inner side; middle femora al- most entirely yellow; hind femora yellow, a dark band around the middle; the rest of legs yellow, except the last two joints of all the tarsi. Wings infuscated anteriorly, darkest along the veins. Length: Body about 12–14 mm., wing 11–12 mm. " from original description
The male genitalia were figured by Metcalf.

== Distribution ==
Canada, United States.
