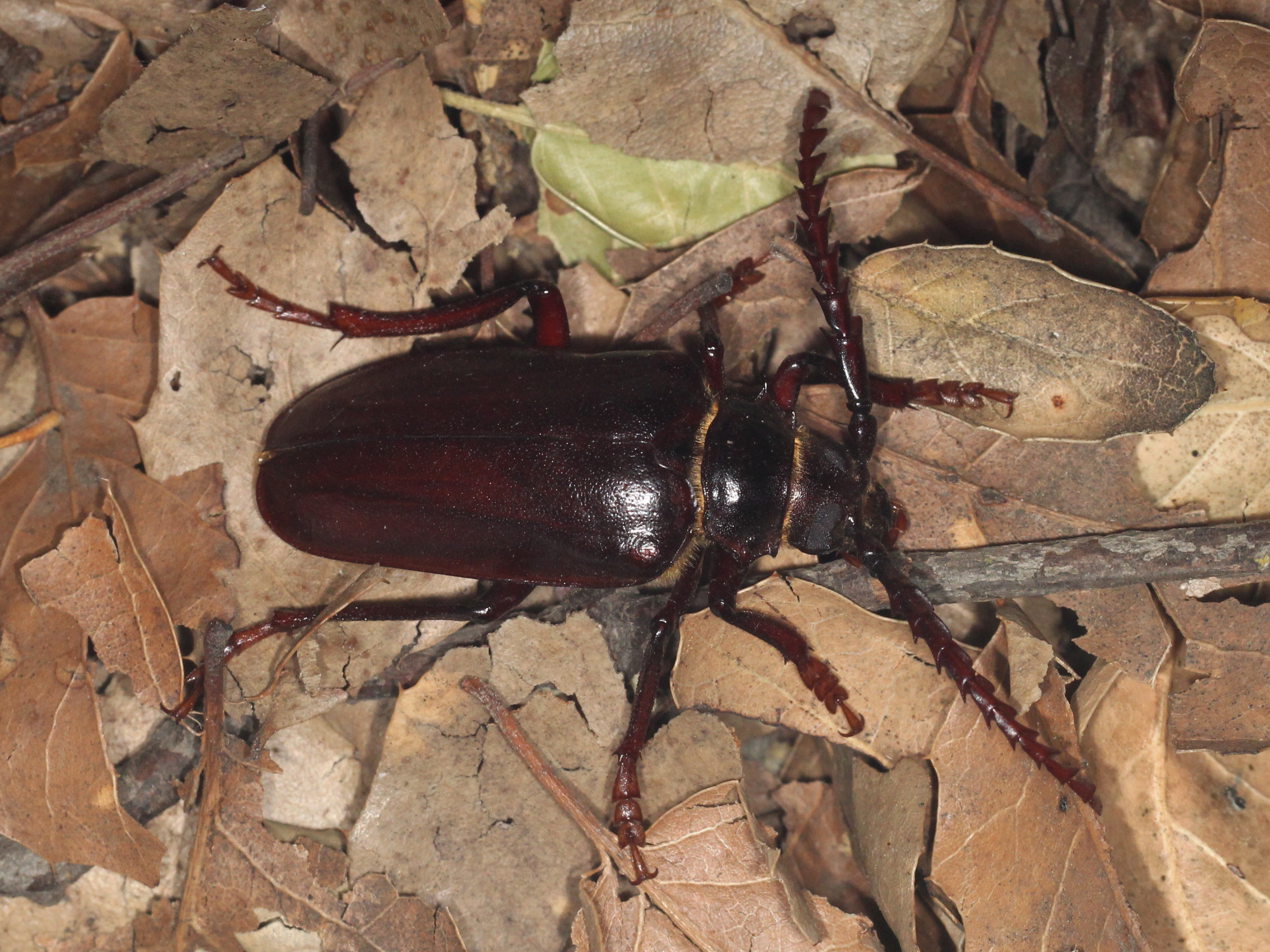
- Prionus californicus from California

Scientific classification
- Kingdom: Animalia
- Phylum: Arthropoda
- Clade: Pancrustacea
- Class: Insecta
- Order: Coleoptera
- Suborder: Polyphaga
- Infraorder: Cucujiformia
- Family: Cerambycidae
- Subfamily: Prioninae
- Tribe: Prionini
- Genus: Prionus; Geoffroy, 1762

= Prionus =

Genus of beetles

Prionus Geoffroy, 1762 is a genus of long-horned beetles of the subfamily Prioninae, tribe Prionini, widespread in Europe, Asia and North America.

== Description ==
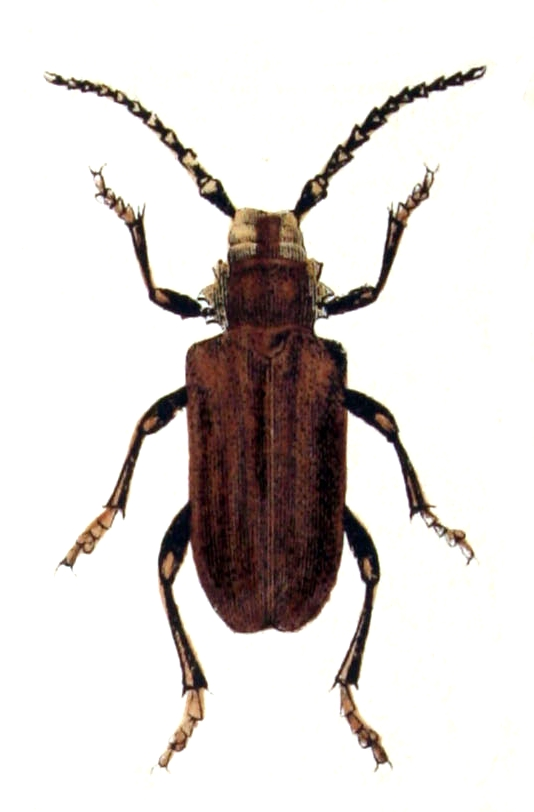
P. coriarius

The members of this genus are large (25–70 mm) and usually brown or black.

All members of the genus Prionus have twelve or more strongly toothed or even flabellate antennomeres on their large antennae.

The only species present in England is "the tanner", Prionus coriarius (Linnaeus, 1758).

Common North American species include the "tile-horned prionus", Prionus imbricornis, the "California root borer", Prionus californicus, and the "broad-necked root borer", Prionus laticollis.

== Biology ==
The adults are nocturnal and are attracted to light, while their larvae feed on rotting wood or roots.

== Species ==
The following species are recognised in the genus Prionus:

- Prionus arenarius Hovore, 1981
- Prionus aztecus Casey, 1912
- Prionus californicus Motschulsky, 1845
- Prionus coriarius (Linnaeus, 1758)
- Prionus corpulentus Bates, 1878
- Prionus debilis Casey, 1891
- Prionus delavayi Fairmaire, 1887
- Prionus elegans Demelt, 1972
- Prionus elliotti Gahan, 1906
- Prionus emarginatus Say, 1824
- Prionus evae Demelt, 1972
- Prionus evoluticornis Komiya & Nogueira, 2014
- Prionus fissicornis Haldeman, 1845
- Prionus flohri Bates, 1884
- Prionus gahani Lameere, 1912
- Prionus galantiorum Drumont & Komiya, 2006
- Prionus geminus Santos-Silva, Nearns & Swift, 2016
- Prionus heroicus Semenov, 1907
- Prionus howdeni Chemsak, 1979
- Prionus imbricornis (Linnaeus, 1767)
- Prionus insularis Motschulsky, 1858
- Prionus integer LeConte, 1851
- Prionus komiyai Lorenc, 1999
- Prionus kucerai Drumont & Komiya, 2006
- Prionus lameerei Semenov, 1927
- Prionus laminicornis Fairmaire, 1897
- Prionus laticollis (Drury, 1773)
- Prionus lecontei Lameere, 1912
- Prionus mali Drumont, Xi & Rapuzzi, 2015
- Prionus mexicanus Bates, 1884
- Prionus murzini Drumont & Komiya 2006
- Prionus nakamurai Ohbayashi & Makihara, 1985
- Prionus ohbayashii Komiya, 2009
- Prionus palparis Say, 1824
- Prionus pocularis Dalman in Schoenherr, 1817
- Prionus poultoni Lameere, 1912
- Prionus puae Drumont & Komiya, 2006
- Prionus scabripunctatus Hayashi, 1971
- Prionus sejunctus Hayashi, 1959
- Prionus sifanicus Plavilstshikov, 1934
- Prionus simplex (Casey, 1912)
- Prionus siskai Drumont & Komiya, 2006
- Prionus sontinh Do, Drumont & Komiya, 2019
- Prionus spinipennis Hovore & Turnbow, 1984
- Prionus sterbai Heyrovsky, 1950
- Prionus vartianorum Fuchs, 1967
