= Billaea africana =

Scientific classification
- Kingdom: Animalia
- Phylum: Arthropoda
- Class: Insecta
- Order: Diptera
- Family: Tachinidae
- Subfamily: Dexiinae
- Tribe: Dexiini
- Genus: Billaea
- Species: B. africana

Binomial name
- Billaea africana (Villeneuve, 1935)

Synonyms
- Billaea neavei Emden, 1947; Paraprosena africana Villeneuve, 1935

Species of fly

Billaea africana is a species of fly in the family Tachinidae.

== Distribution ==
Congo, Ethiopia, Kenya, Nigeria, South Africa, Tanzania.
