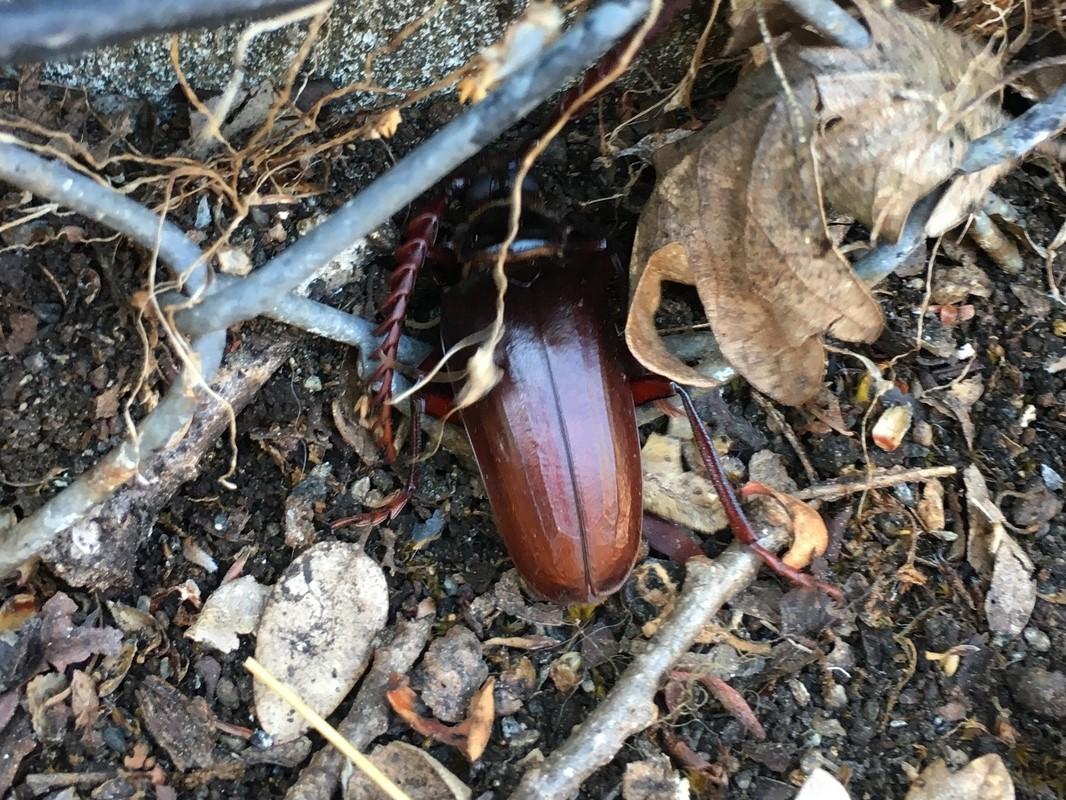

Scientific classification
- Domain: Eukaryota
- Kingdom: Animalia
- Phylum: Arthropoda
- Class: Insecta
- Order: Coleoptera
- Suborder: Polyphaga
- Infraorder: Cucujiformia
- Family: Cerambycidae
- Genus: Prionus
- Species: P. lecontei

Binomial name
- Prionus lecontei Lameere, 1912

= Prionus lecontei =

Species of beetle

Prionus lecontei is a species of longhorn beetle. It is found on the west coast of North America from British Columbia to Baja California.
