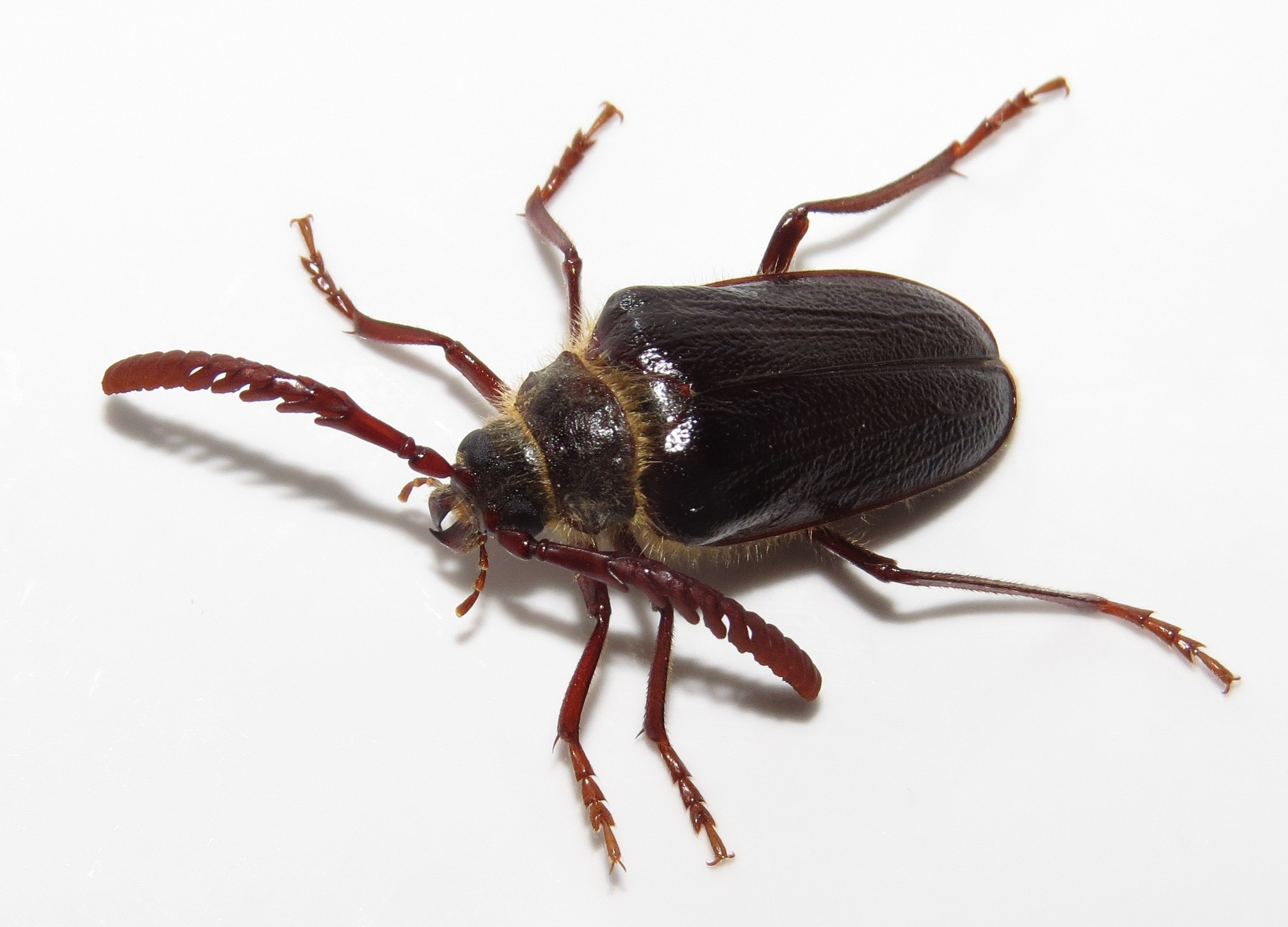

Scientific classification
- Domain: Eukaryota
- Kingdom: Animalia
- Phylum: Arthropoda
- Class: Insecta
- Order: Coleoptera
- Suborder: Polyphaga
- Infraorder: Cucujiformia
- Family: Cerambycidae
- Genus: Prionus
- Species: P. emarginatus

Binomial name
- Prionus emarginatus Say, 1824

Synonyms
- Prionus debiliceps (Casey, 1912); Prionus innocuus LeConte, 1862; Prionus pubicollis (Casey, 1912)

= Prionus emarginatus =

Species of beetle

Prionus emarginatus is a species of long-horned beetle in the family Cerambycidae. It is found in North America.
