= Billaea fortis =

Scientific classification
- Kingdom: Animalia
- Phylum: Arthropoda
- Class: Insecta
- Order: Diptera
- Family: Tachinidae
- Subfamily: Dexiinae
- Tribe: Dexiini
- Genus: Billaea
- Species: B. fortis

Binomial name
- Billaea fortis (Rondani, 1862)

Synonyms
- Billaea magna Kolomiets, 1966; Dexia alivarians Pandellé, 1896; Dexia dirphia Walker, 1849; Omalostoma fortis Rondani, 1862; Omalostoma robusta Rondani, 1862

Species of fly

Billaea fortis is a species of fly in the family Tachinidae.

== Distribution ==
Belarus, Ukraine, Finland, Sweden, Bulgaria, Italy, Austria, France, Switzerland, Japan, Kazakhstan, Russia, Transcaucasia, China.
