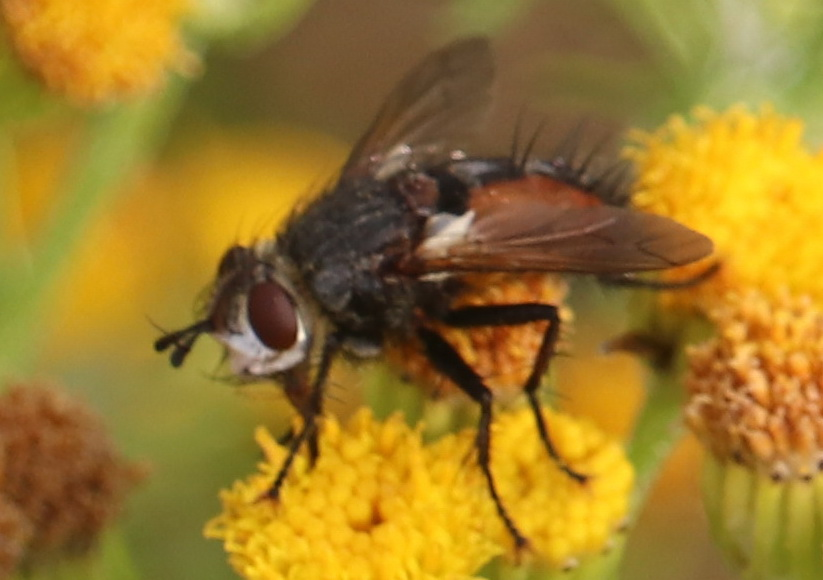

Scientific classification
- Kingdom: Animalia
- Phylum: Arthropoda
- Clade: Pancrustacea
- Class: Insecta
- Order: Diptera
- Family: Tachinidae
- Subfamily: Tachininae
- Tribe: Tachinini
- Genus: Peleteria
- Species: P. rubescens

Binomial name
- Peleteria rubescens Robineau-Desvoidy, 1830

Synonyms
- Echinomyia rubescens Robineau-Desvoidy, 1830; Echinomyia nigricornis Meigen, 1838; Peleteria pulverulenta Robineau-Desvoidy, 1863; Echinomyia tessellata Zetterstedt, 1844

= Peleteria rubescens =

Species of fly

Peleteria rubescens is a Palearctic species of fly in the family Tachinidae.

== Distribution ==
It is found throughout Europe from Portugal to Russia, and Mongolia.
