= Hadromyia opaca =

Scientific classification
- Kingdom: Animalia
- Phylum: Arthropoda
- Class: Insecta
- Order: Diptera
- Family: Syrphidae
- Tribe: Milesiini
- Subtribe: Xylotina
- Genus: Hadromyia
- Subgenus: Chrysosomidia
- Species: H. opaca

Binomial name
- Hadromyia opaca (Shannon, 1916)

Synonyms
- Caliprobola opacus Shannon, 1916

Species of fly

Hadromyia opaca is a species of hoverfly in the family Syrphidae.

== Distribution ==
Canada, United States.
