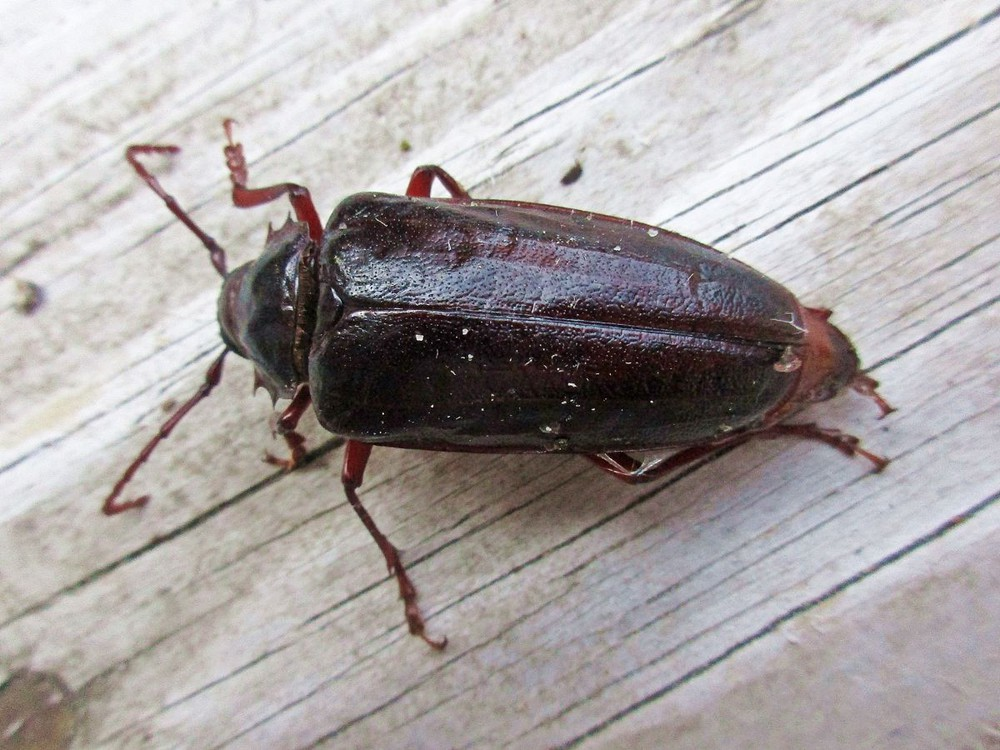
- Female

Scientific classification
- Domain: Eukaryota
- Kingdom: Animalia
- Phylum: Arthropoda
- Class: Insecta
- Order: Coleoptera
- Suborder: Polyphaga
- Infraorder: Cucujiformia
- Family: Cerambycidae
- Genus: Prionus
- Species: P. pocularis

Binomial name
- Prionus pocularis Dalman in Schoenherr, 1817

Synonyms
- Prionus bicolor Casey, 1912; Prionus curticornis LeConte, 1851; Prionus laevigatus Harris, 1837; Prionus obliquicornis LeConte, 1851; Prionus pocularis prolixus Casey, 1912; Prionus validiceps Casey, 1912

= Prionus pocularis =

Species of beetle

Prionus pocularis, the tooth-necked longhorn beetle, is a species of long-horned beetle in the family Cerambycidae. It is found in North America.
