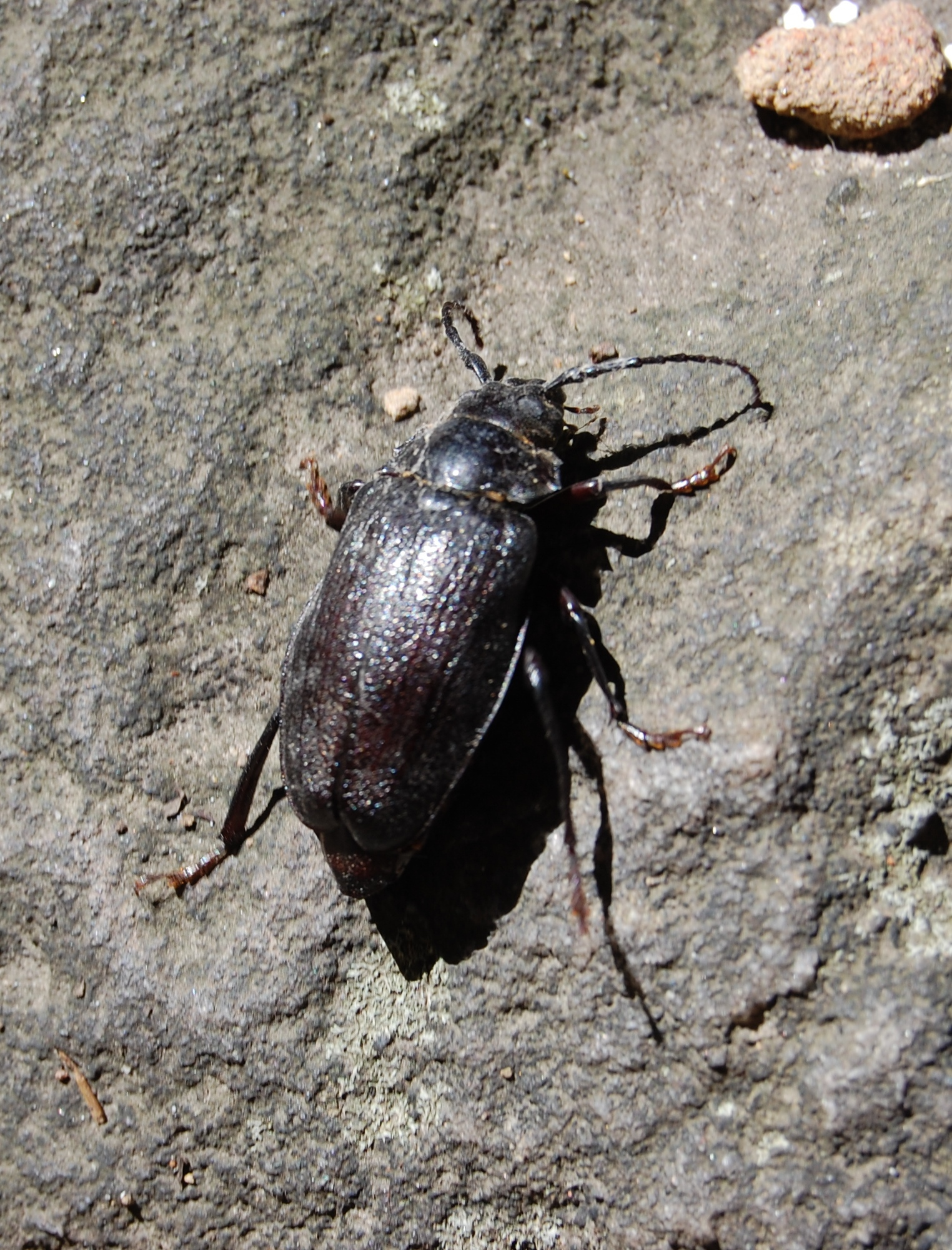

Scientific classification
- Kingdom: Animalia
- Phylum: Arthropoda
- Clade: Pancrustacea
- Class: Insecta
- Order: Coleoptera
- Suborder: Polyphaga
- Infraorder: Cucujiformia
- Family: Cerambycidae
- Genus: Prionus
- Species: P. imbricornis

Binomial name
- Prionus imbricornis Linnaeus, 1767

= Prionus imbricornis =

Species of beetle

Prionus imbricornis is a longhorn beetle of the genus Prionus. Found in the U.S. as far north as New York and as far west as Kansas and Texas, its larvae are an agricultural threat to apples, blueberries, pecans.
