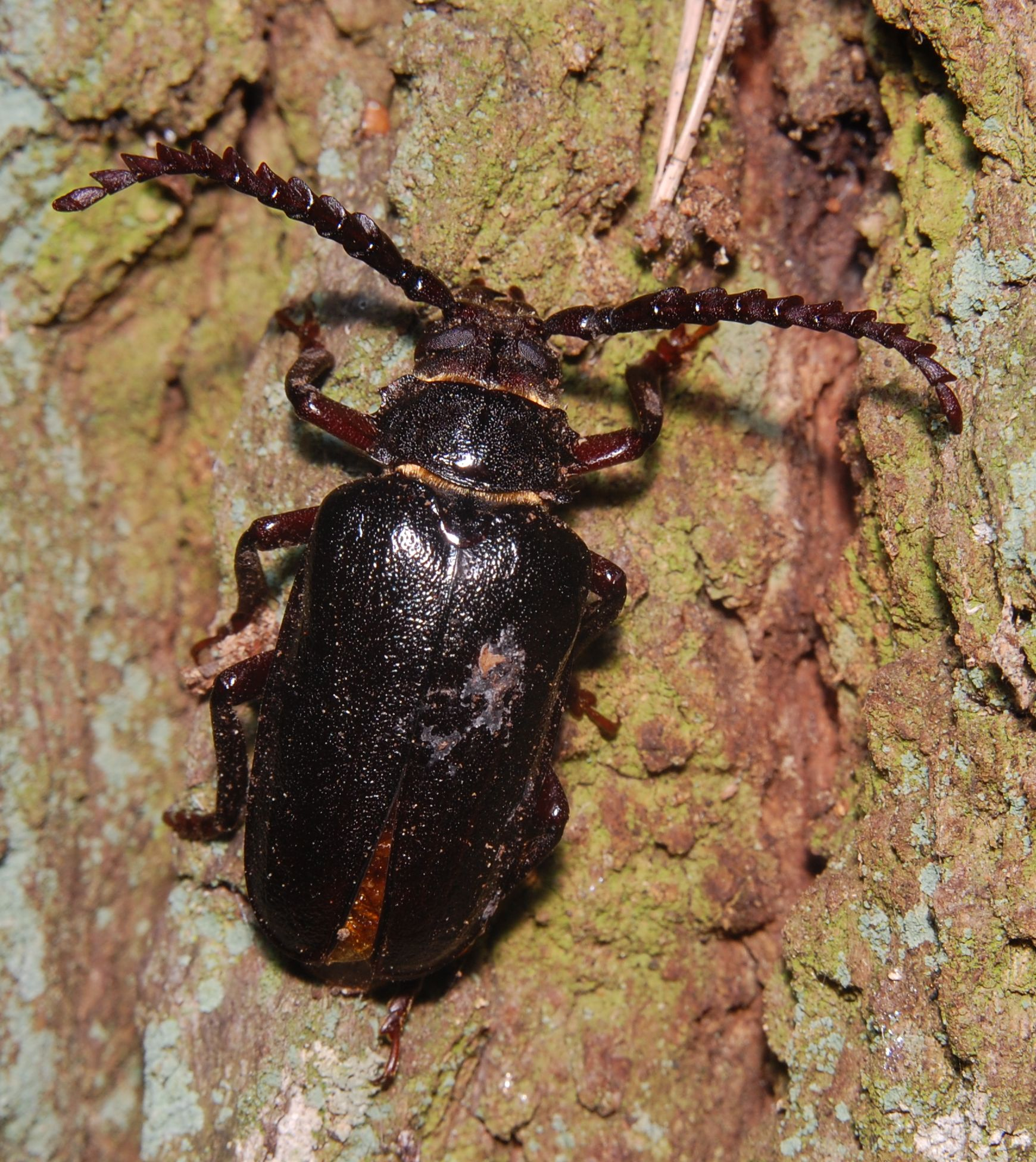

Scientific classification
- Kingdom: Animalia
- Phylum: Arthropoda
- Class: Insecta
- Order: Coleoptera
- Suborder: Polyphaga
- Infraorder: Cucujiformia
- Family: Cerambycidae
- Genus: Prionus
- Species: P. coriarius

Binomial name
- Prionus coriarius (Linnaeus, 1758)

= Prionus coriarius =

Species of beetle

Prionus coriarius (sometimes referred to as "the tanner" or "the sawyer") is a species of longhorn beetle.

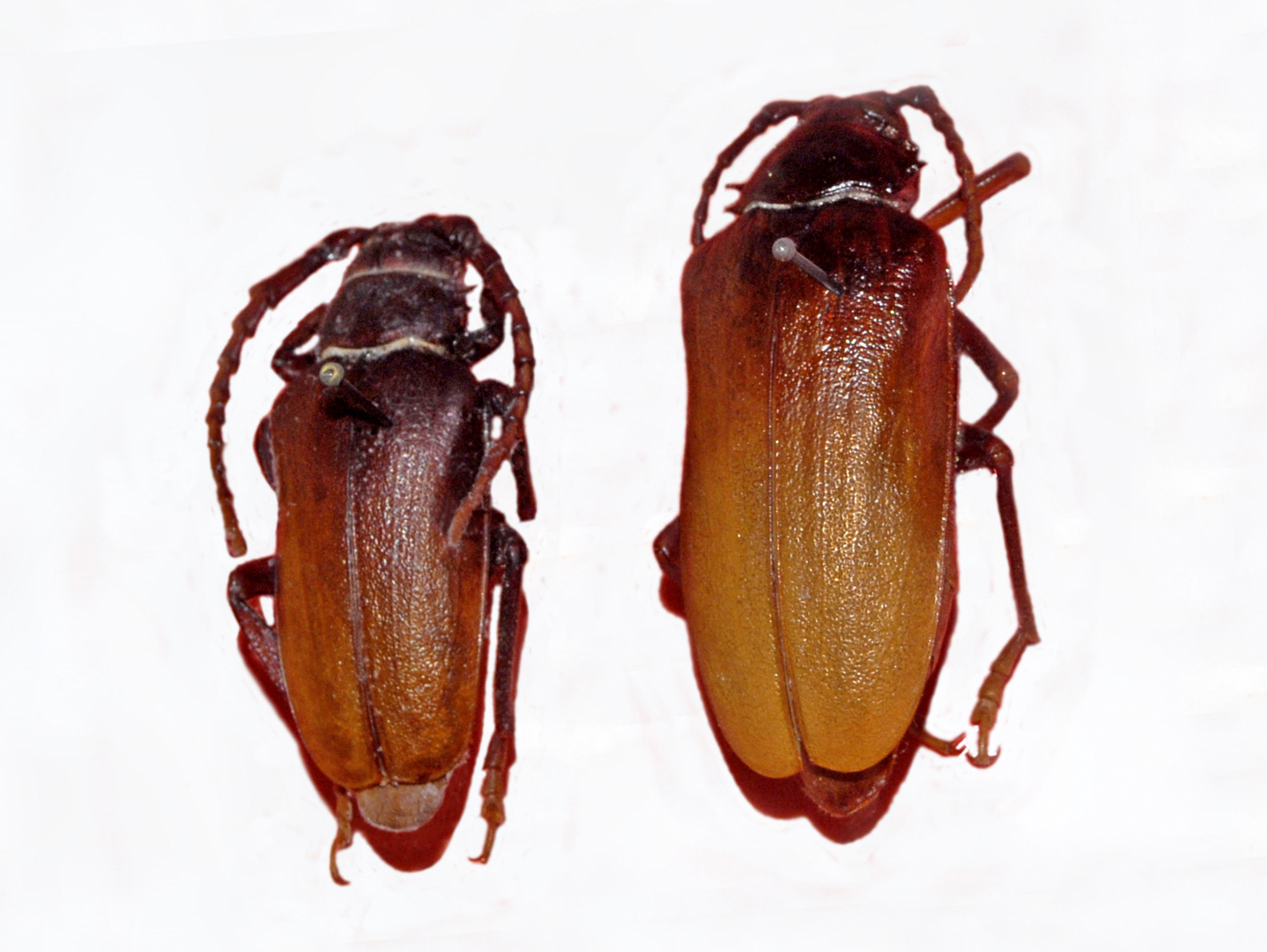
Prionus coriarius, male and female. Mounted specimen

== Description ==
Prionus coriarius can reach a length of 18–45 millimetres (0.71–1.77 in). It is the most massive of European beetles. The female is larger than the male. Body is shiny, dark brown to black. The neck shield bears on each side three clearly distinct teeth. The serrated antennae of the male are composed of 12 segments. The ventral surface of the female is hairless, while in the male is pubescent.

== Biology ==
The larvae are polyphagous, but they mainly develop in rotten wood of deciduous and coniferous trees. They can reach a length of about 60 millimetres (2.4 in). The life cycle lasts at least 3 years. Adults can be found from July to September. Its activity is mainly crepuscular and nocturnal.

== Distribution ==
This species is common in most of Europe and it is present in North Africa and in the Near East (Turkey, Caucasus, Transcaucasia, Iran).
