= Josef Aloizievitsch Portschinsky =

Russian entomologist

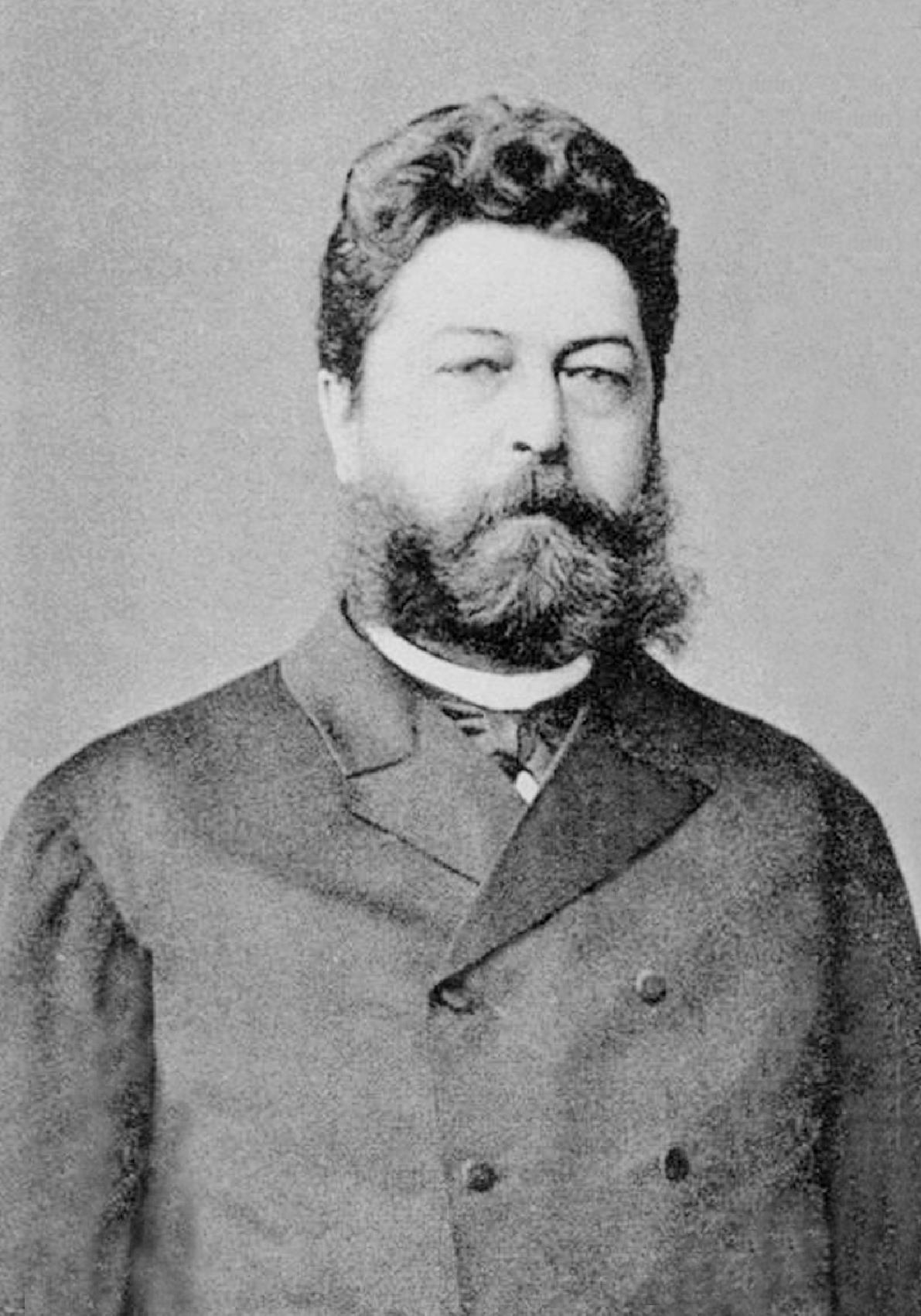

Josef Aloizievitsch Portschinsky (Russian: Иосиф Алоизиевич Порчинский, 1848–1916), was a Russian entomologist.
