= Syrphidae of New York State =

Family of flies in New York, United States

Total of 245 species either found or highly expected to be found in New York.

== Subfamily ERISTALINAE ==
=== Tribe Brachyopini ===
This tribe contains 8 genera and 31 or likely more species found in New York State

Genera table
Genus	authority	common name	# in N.Y.	Defining characteristics
Brachyopa	Meigen, 1822	Sapeater Fly	8	Face and scutellum tan to orange or yellow. Last section of R_{4+5} vein shorter than crossvein h.
Chrysogaster	Meigen, 1803	Wrinkleheaded Fly	1	Last section of R_{4+5} longer than crossvein r-m. Face entirely black. Antennae on lower part of head.
Chrysosyrphus	Sedman, 1965	Wrinkleheaded Fly	1	like Chrysogaster but antennae on upper part of head.
Hammerschmidtia	Schummel, 1834	Logsitter Fly	2	postalar callus, and scutellum with strong bristles. Hind tibia with short strong black spines.
Myolepta	Newman, 1838	Pegleg Fly	3	Front and middle femora with short strong spines near the apex.
Neoascia	Williston, 1886	Fen Fly	3	Small flies with petiolate abdomen, M1 forming a right angle with R_{4+5}.
Orthonevra	Macquart, 1829	Mucksucker Fly	4	flagellum at least twice as long as wide. Eyes with horizontal or meandering lines.
Sphegina	Meigen, 1822	Pufftail Fly	9	Abdomen petiolate. Swollen hind femur with ventral spines.

==== Genus Brachyopa ====
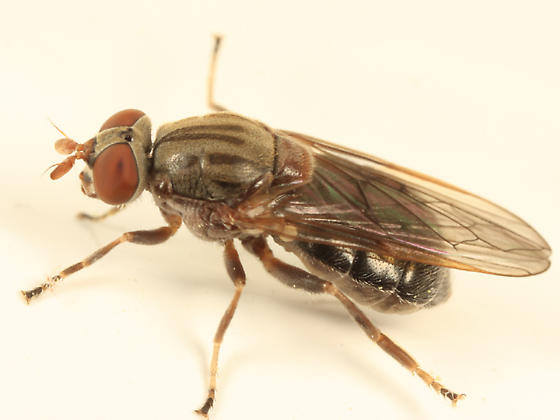
Brachyopa daeckei

- Brachyopa caesariata
- B. diversa
- B. flavescens
- B. notata
- B perplexa
- B. punctipennis
- B. daeckei
- B. vacua

==== Genus Chrysogaster ====
- Chrysogaster antitheus (Walker, 1849) The Short-haired Wrinklehead is a fairly common species.

==== Genus Chrysosyrphus ====
- Chrysosyrphus latus ( (Loew, 1863) The Variable Wrinklehead is a rare species

==== Genus Hammerschmidtia ====
Hammerschmidtia is a Holarctic Genus of hoverflies. The larvae are found in sap under the bark of downed trees. They appear quite unlike other syrphids, having drab colors and numerous bristles but on closer inspection they do have the general indicators of syrphids in a spurious vein.

- Hammerschmidtia rufa, The Black-bristled Logsitter is an uncommon species.
- Hammerschmidtia sedmani Pale-bristled Logsitter is a rare species in N.Y.

==== Genus Myolepta ====
Three species of Myolepta occur in New York. Keys and descriptions of this species was made by Fluke and Weems in 1956. Larvae are described by Rotheray

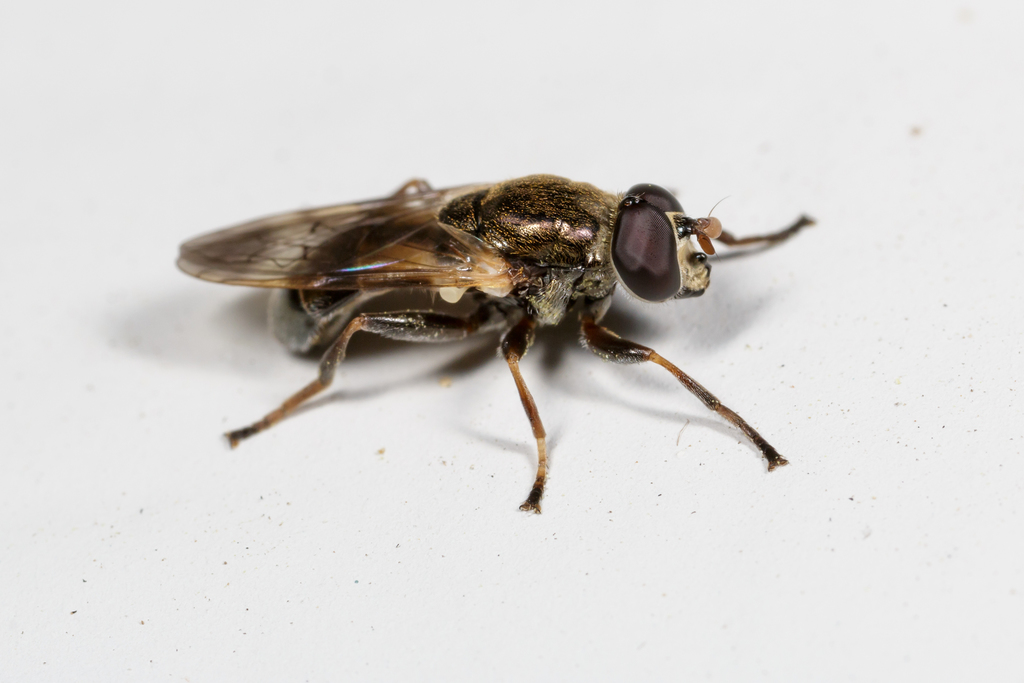
Myolepta varipes

- Myolepta strigilata
- M. nigra
- M. varipes

==== Genus Neoascia ====
Neoascia (Williston, 1886) Fen Flies These are very small (3.5–5 mm) black and yellow or metallic green flies with a narrow abdomen near the thorax. They occur mainly in damp places around plants. . Neoascia larvae have been recovered from wet manure in farmyards, and decaying vegetation at the edges of ponds. In 1925 Curran reviewed the Genus Neoascia

- Neoascia metallica (Williston, 1882 ) The Double-banded Fen Fly, is a common species.
- Neoascia tenur (Harris, 1780) The Black-kneed Fen Fly is a common species that was formerly considered to be only European now considered to be throughout North America and Canada.
- Neoascia globosa (Walker, 1849) The Black-margined Fen Fly is a fairly common species.

==== Genus Orthonevra ====
Four species Orthonevra (Macquart, 1829) of these small dark metallic flies are found in New York. Sedman divided this genus into two groups, the pictipennis group of which N.Y. has O. pictipennis, O. Weemsi and O. pulchella and the Bellula group with O. nitida being found in N.Y. This genus is one of the few where the eyes are ornamented with either horizontal medial lines or meandering lines across the eye. Keys and descriptions have been provided by Sedman.

- Orthonevra nitida (Wiedemann, 1830) The Wavy mucksucker is a fairly common species.

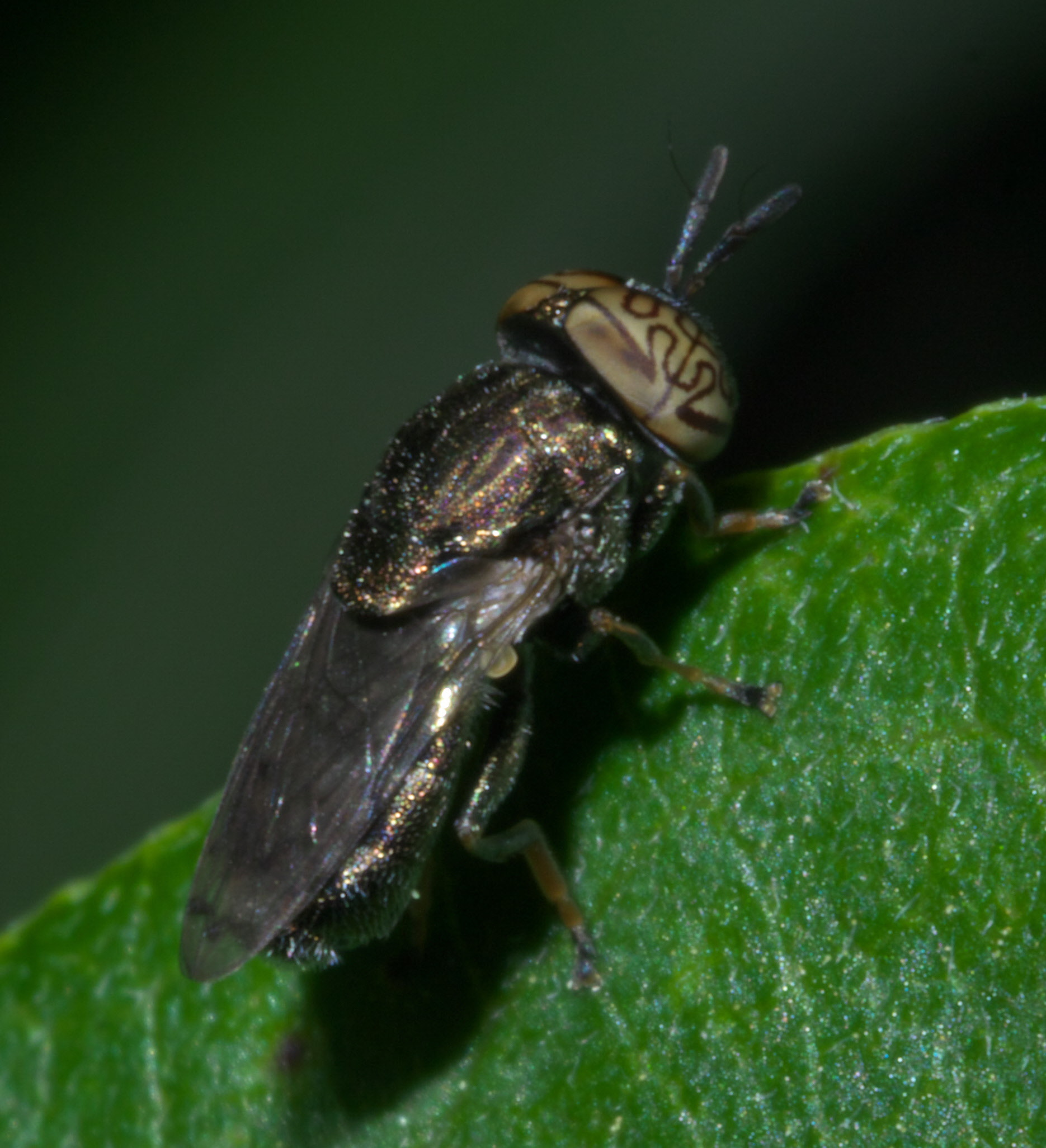
Orthonevra nitida

- Orthonevra pictipennis (Loew, 1863) Dusky-veined Mucksucker is an uncommon species.
- Orthonevra pulchella (Williston, 1887) The Dusky Mucksucker is a fairly common species.
- Orthonevra weemsi (Sedman, 1966) Weems' Mucksucker is a rare species.

==== Genus Sphegina ====
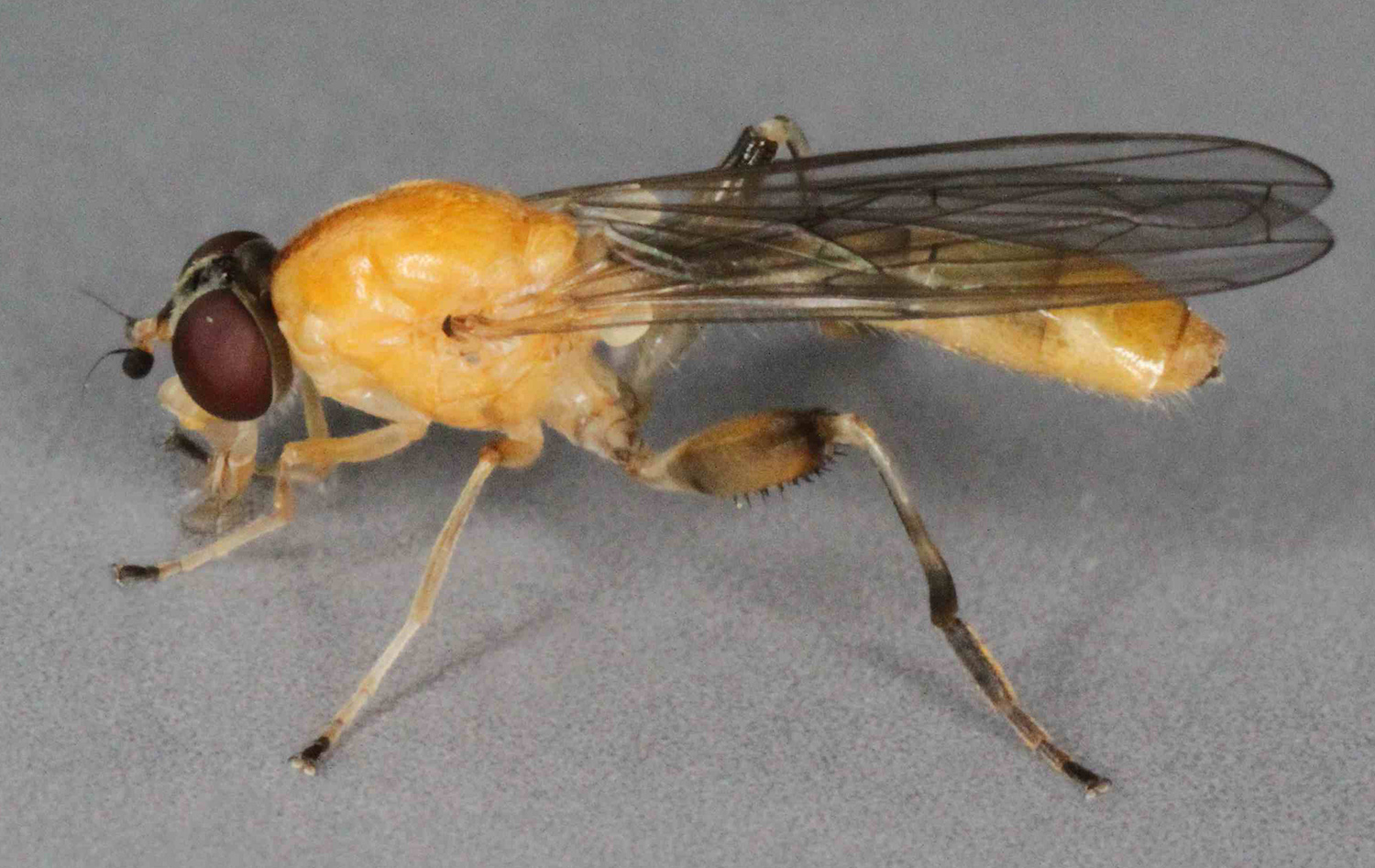
Sphegina sp.

These are distinctive small flies with a thin elongate abdomen and enlarged hind femur often with spines and or teeth. The larvae are found under bark in water soaked areas. Rotheray has described European species and habitats as well as a key to larvae including sphegina and other syrphid genera. Keys to adult American species was provided by Coovert. New York species can also be found southward especially in the Appalachian Mountains and also north to the New England States.
There are various keys online, Covert 1977 Hull, 1935 and Malloch, 1922

Sphegina (Meigen, 1822)
Sphegina brachygaster	Hull, 1935	Thick-waisted Pufftail	fairly common
Sphegina campanulata	Robertson, 1901	Orange-horned Pufftail	fairly common
Sphegina flavimana	John Russell Malloch, 1922	Tuberculate Pufftail	fairly common
Sphegina flavomaculata	John Russell Malloch, 1922	Tooth-legged Pufftail	uncommon
Sphegina keeniana	Williston, 1887	Peg-legged pufftail	fairly common
Sphegina lobata	Loew, 1863	Yellow-lobed Pufftail	uncommon
Sphegina lobulifera	John Russell Malloch, 1922	Black-lobed Pufftail	uncommon
Sphegina petiolata	Coquillett, 1910	Long-spined Pufftail	uncommon
Sphegina rufiventris	Loew, 1910	Black-horned pufftail	common

=== Tribe Callicerini ===
==== Genus Callicera ====
Only one species of this tribe is found in New york in the genus Callicera (Panzer, 1809).

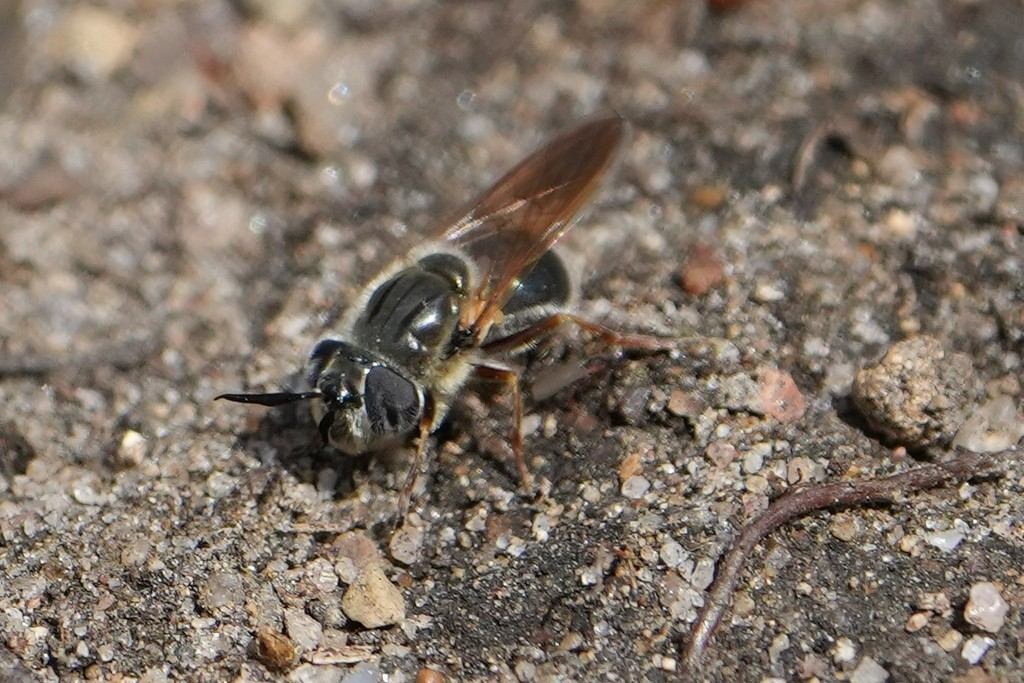
Callicera erratica

- Callicera erratica (Walker, 1849) The Golden Pine Fly is a rare species.

=== Tribe Cerioidini ===
==== Genus Ceriana ====
Ceriana(Rafinesque, 1815) has but one species in New York.

- Ceriana abbreviata (Loew, 1864) The Northern Wasp Fly

==== Genus Sphiximorpha ====
Sphiximorpha (Rondani, 1850) is represented by a single rare species in New York.

- Sphiximorpha willistoni (Kahl, 1897) Williston's Wasp Fly is a rare species.

=== Tribe Eristalini ===
==== Subtribe Eristalina ====
===== Genus Eristalinus =====
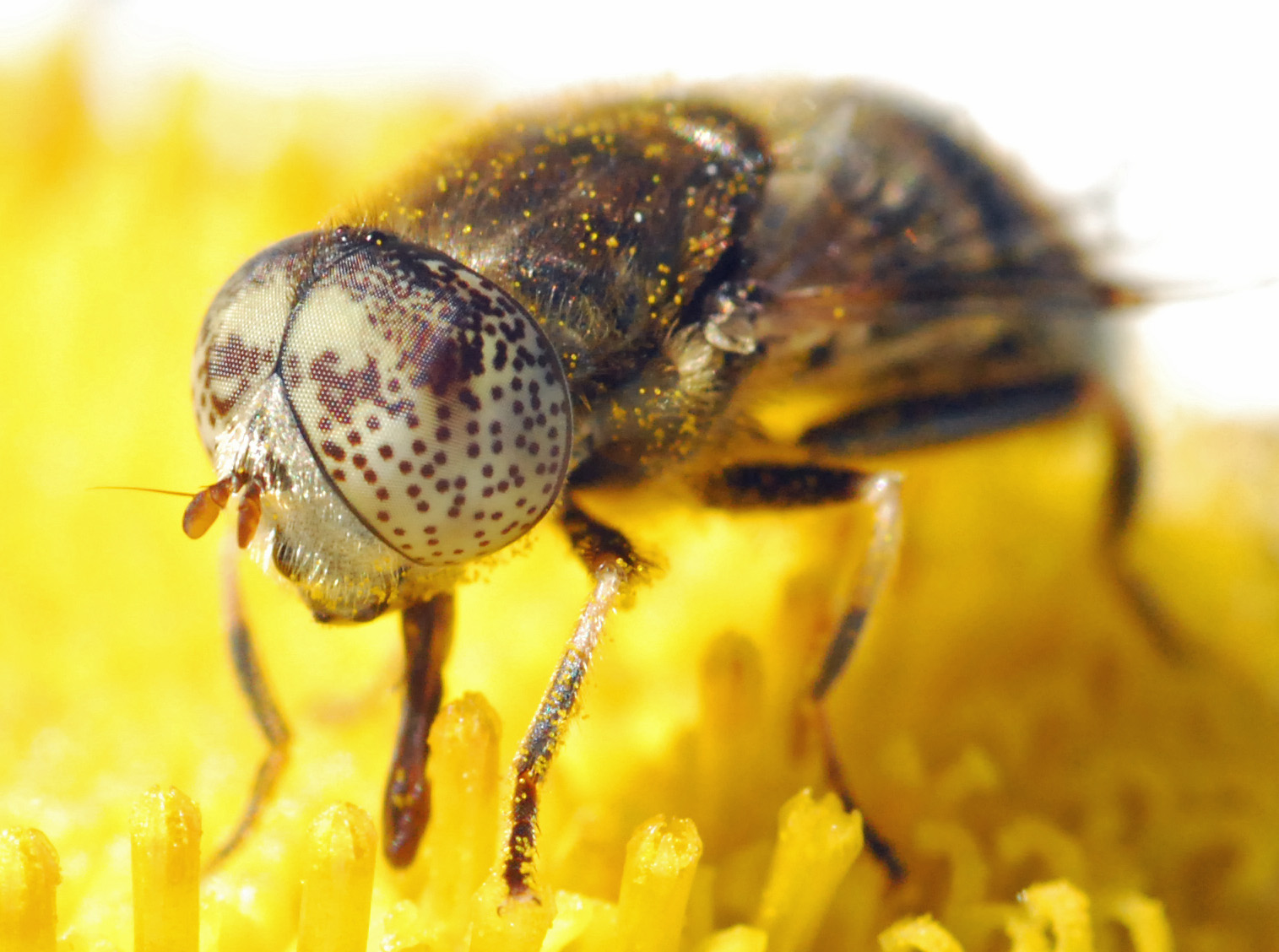
Eristalinus aeneus

- Eristalinus aeneus (Scopoli, 1763) The Common Lagoon Fly is fairly common.

===== Genus Eristalis =====
New York has an prevalence of Eristalids many of which are striking in color and exhibit mimicry to the bees. The larvae are of the rat-tailed type. Eristalis along with many sister species has the r4+5 vein making a distinct loop towards the rear of the wing.

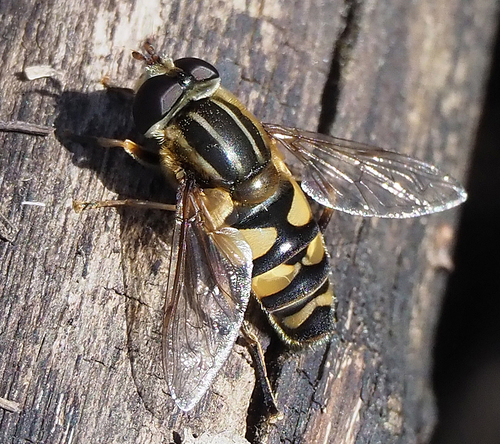
Helophilus fasciatus

Species list

- Eristalis anthophorina ,
- E. arbustorum,
- E.brousii,
- E. cryptarum,
- E. dimidiata,
- E. flavipes,
- E. interrupta,
- E. obscura,
- E. rupium,
- E. saxorum,
- E. tenax,
- E. transversa.

===== Genus Palpada =====
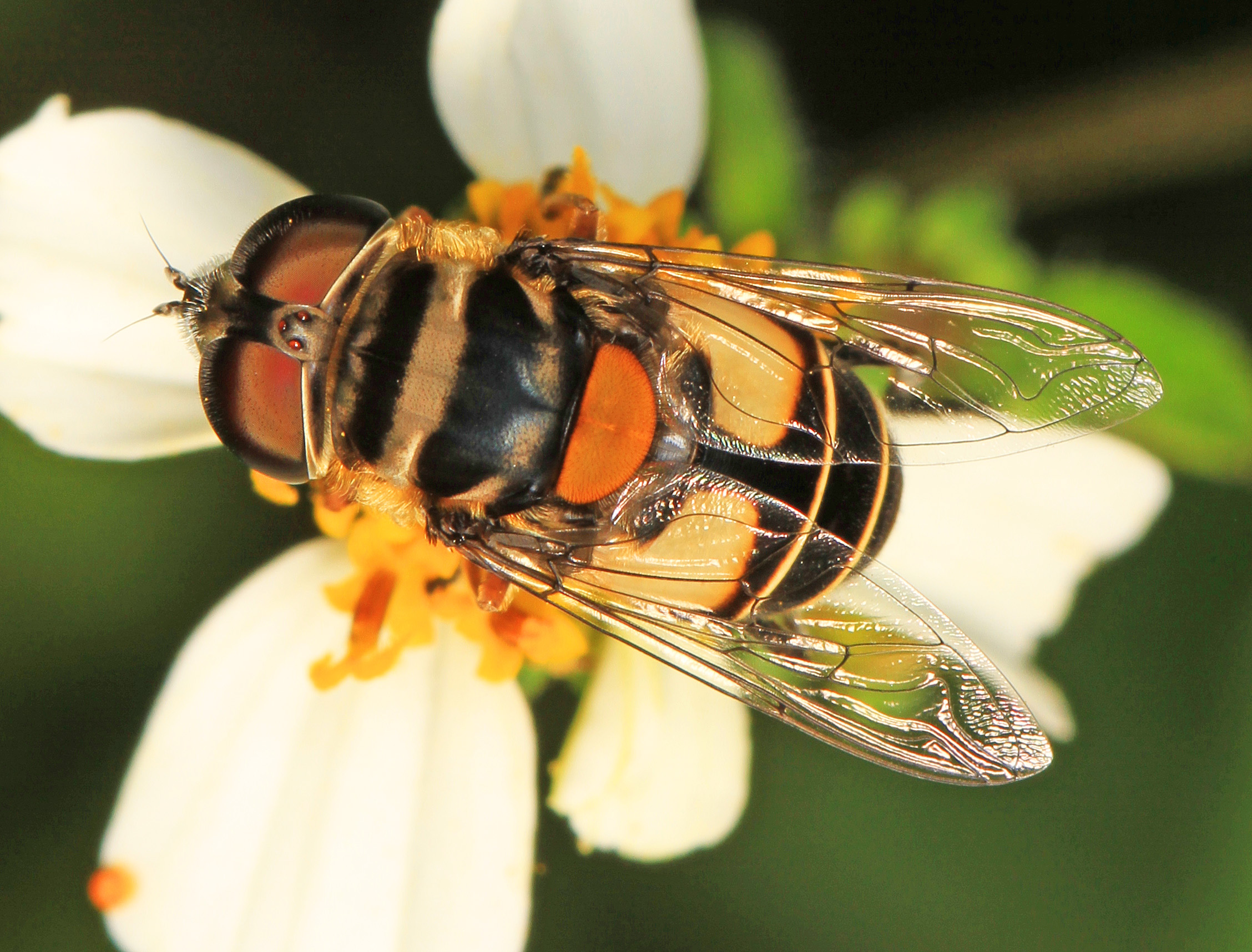
Palpada_albifrons Everglades National_Park

- Palpada albifrons (Weidemann 1830) The White-faced Plushback is a rare vagrant
- Palpada vinetorum (Fabricius 1799) The Northern Plushback is a fairly common species

==== Subtribe Helophilina ====
Helophilina characteristics
Genus	Thorax	Abdomen	Hind tibia	Other
Notes	This table is confined to New York species.			
Helophilus, key	Longitudinal stripes	Abdomen oval, with large orange markings	variable	Stigma long
Anasimia, key ( as Lejops)	Longitudinal stripes	narrow	variable	
Polydontomyia, single species	not striped	slightly narrowed, black with solid yellow-orange behind, all brownish gray in female	arcuate and produced into a long apical spur	
Mallota, key	not striped, Thick pile	compact and thick pile	without long apical spur	bumblebee mimic
Parhelophilus, Key	longitudinal stripes	compact	truncate at apex.	stigma short
Eurimyia, single species	longitudinal stripes	sawtooth yellow spots	without long apical spur, two black rings	face produced into an elongate cone

===== Genus Eurimyia =====
- Eurimyia stipata the Long-nosed Swamp Fly.

===== Genus Helophilus =====
- Helophilus fasciatus
- H. latifrons
- H. obscurus

===== Genus Anasimyia =====
- Anasimyia bilinearis
- A. chrysostoma
- A. distinctus
- A. grisescens
- A. lunulata
- A. lineata

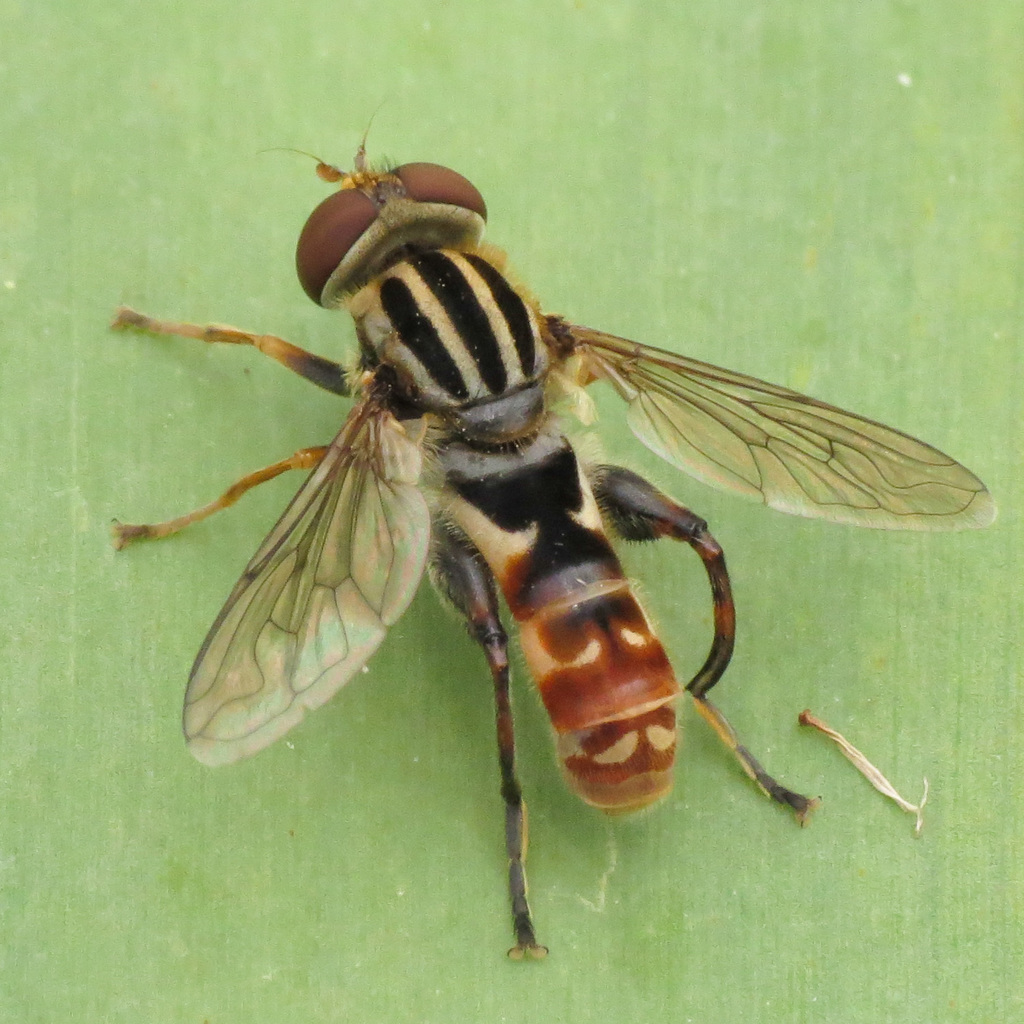
Anasimyia chrysostoma

===== Genus Polydontomyia =====
- Polydontomyia curvipes (Weidemann, 1830) The Dimorphic Sickleleg is locally common along salt marshes.

===== Genus Mallota =====
Large flies that strongly resemble bumblebees. The larvae of, M. cimhiciformis (Fallen) and M. posticata (Fabricius) develop in detritus-containing rot pockets, usually wet tree holes in upright deciduous trees.

- Mallota cimbiciformis, (Fallén, 1816)
- Mallota bautias Walker 1849 The Bare-eyed Mimic is a common species
- Mallota posticata, Fabricius 1805, The Hairy-eyed Mimic is a common species.

===== Genus Parhelophilus =====
- Parhelophilus divisus
- P. flavifacies
- P. integer
- P. laetus
- P. obsoletus
- P. porcus
- P. rex

=== Tribe Sericomyiini ===
This tribe has only one genus

==== Genus Sericomyia ====
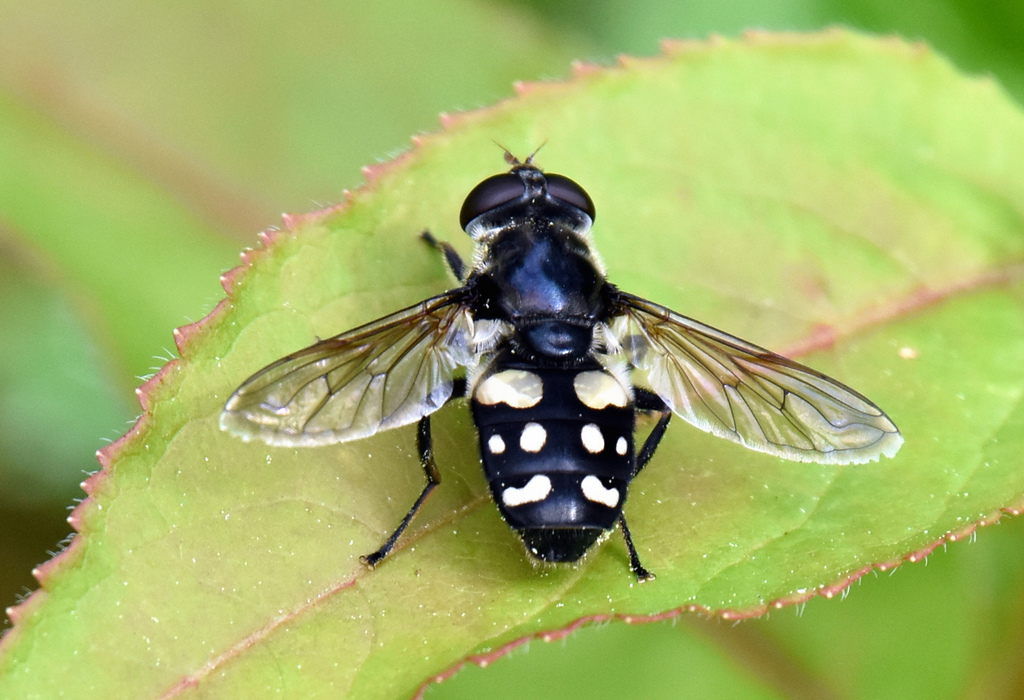
Sericomyia lata

- Sericomyia chrysotoxoides (Macquart 1842) The Oblique-banded Pond Fly is a common species.
- Sericomyia lata (Coquillett 1907) The White-spotted Pond Fly is a common species.
- Sericomyia militaria (Walker, 1849) The Narrow-banded Pond Fly is a common species.
- Sericomyia transversa (Osburn, 1926) The Yellow-spotted Pond Fly is an uncommon species.

=== Tribe Eumerini ===
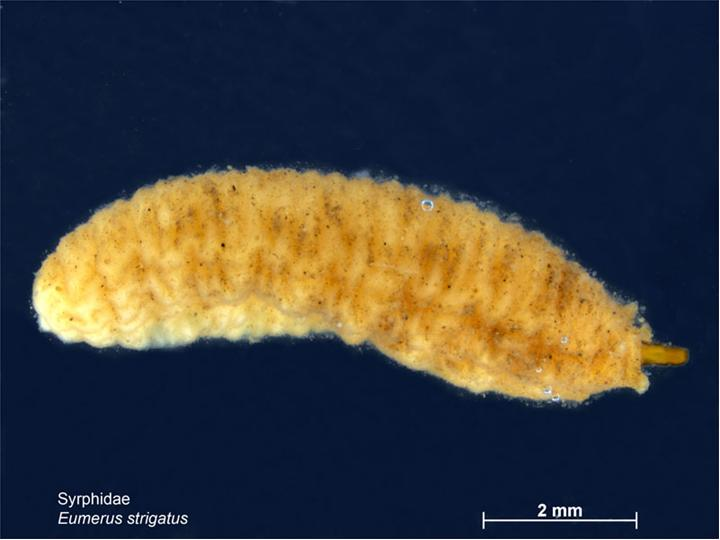
Eumerus strigatus larva

==== Genus Eumerus ====
- Eumerus funeralis (Meigen, 1822) Lesser Bulb Fly is a fairly common species.
- Eumerus strigatus (Fallén, 1817) Onion Bulb Fly is a fairly common species.

==== Genus Merodon ====
- Merodon equestris (Fabricius, 1794) The Narcissus Bulb Fly is a fairly common species.

=== Tribe Milesiini ===
This tribe contains 17 genera with 56 species found in New York

Genera table
name	authority	common name	# in N.Y.	Defining characteristics
Blera	Billberg, 1820	Wood Fly	7	distinct frontal prominence, face downward and forward
Brachypalpus	Macquart, 1834	Catkin Fly	1	triangular face, thorax with thick yellow pile
Chalcosyrphus	Curran, 1925	Leafwalker	10	slender abdomen, enlarged hind femur, often orange legs.
Criorhina	Meigen, 1822	Bumblefly	2	large bumblebee mimics.
Cynorhinella	Curran, 1922	Longnose Fly	1	small thin black fly with large conical face.
Hadromyia	Williston, 1882	Quicksilver Fly	1	black fly metallic patches on abdomen
Lejota	Wahlberg, 1843	Trunksitter Fly	2	all black fly with distinct frontal prominence and straight face.
Milesia	Latreille, 1804	Giant Flower Flies	1	large yellow and black yellowjacket mimic
Pterallastes	Loew, 1863	Goldenback Fly	1	large fly with bright golden thorax. .
Somula	Macquart, 1847	Wood Fly	1	large fly with distinct antennifer and bright yellow abdominal spots.
Sphecomyia	Latreille, 1829	Yellowjacket Fly	1	long antennae black and yellow striped abdomen.
Spilomyia	Meigen, 1803	Hornet Fly	4	vertical eye stripe, yellow and black thorax and abdomen.
Syritta	Linnaeus, 1758	Compost Fly	1	inflated hind femur with orange spots, abdomen with rounded spots
Temnostoma	Le Peletier & Serville	Falsehorn Fly	7	yellow stripe along transverse suture, abdomen with one or two stripes on each segment.
Teuchocnemis	Osten Sacken, 1876	Spur Fly	2	males with large spur on hind tibia
Tropidia	Meigen, 1822	Thickleg Fly	3	hind femur enlarged with triangular shaped process ventrally
Xylota	Meigen, 1822	Leafwalker	11	slender abdomen, enlarged hind femur, abdomen black or with yellow spots.

==== Genus Blera ====
- Blera analis
- B. armillata
- B. badia
- B. confusa
- B. nigra
- B. pictipes
- B. umbratilis

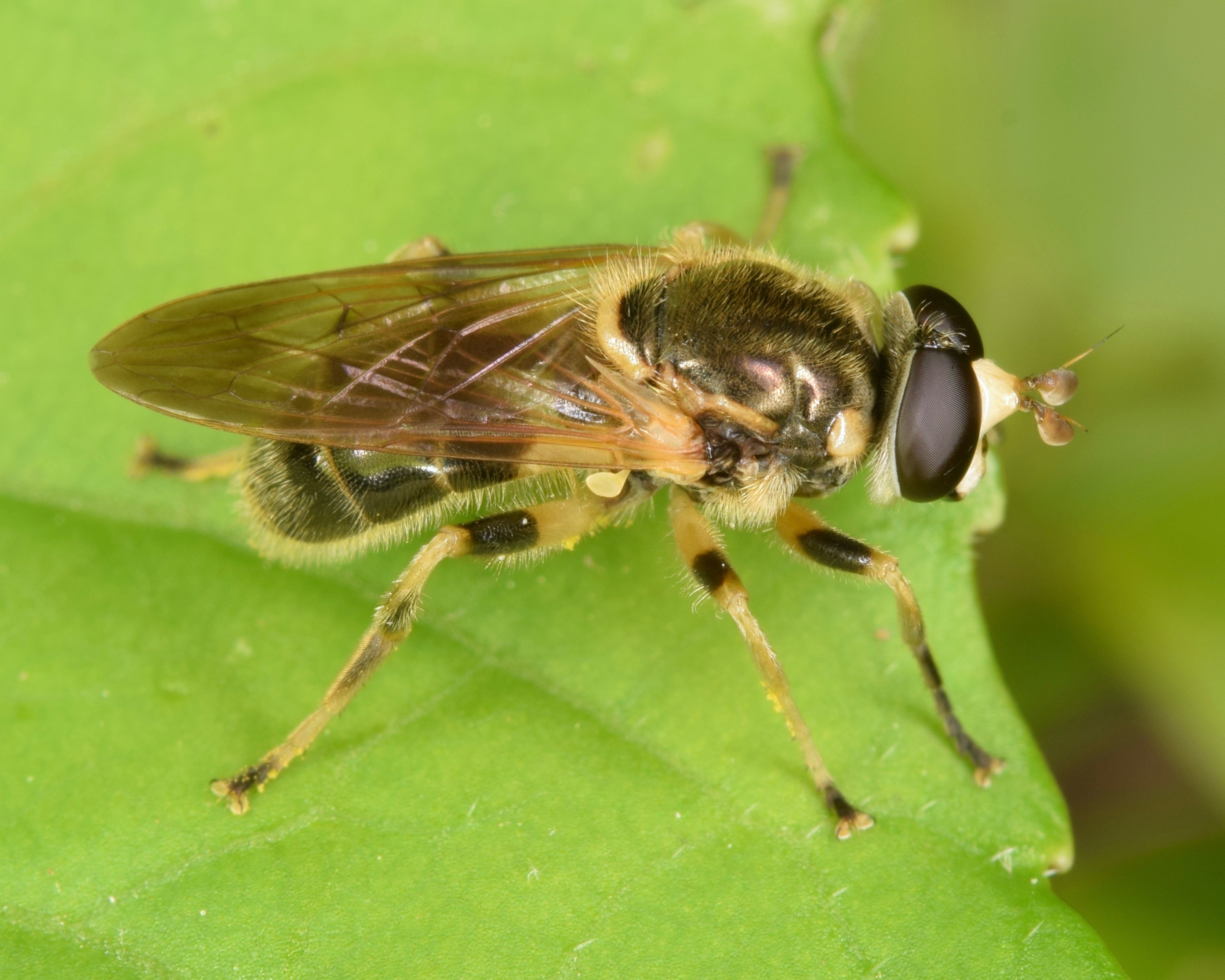
Painted Wood Fly

==== Genus Brachypalpus ====
- Brachypalpus oarus (Walker, 1849) The Eastern Catkin Fly is a fairly common species.

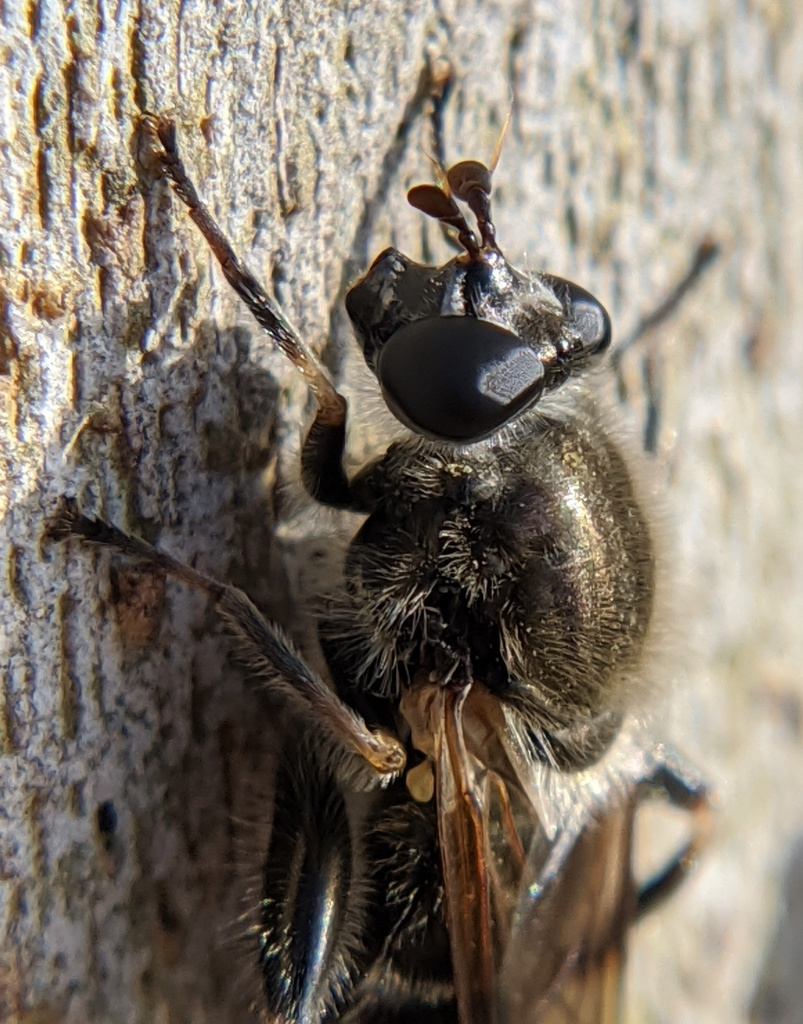
Brachypalpus oarus

==== Genus Chalcosyrphus ====
- C. anthreas (Walker, 1849)
- C. chalybeus (Wiedemann, 1830)
- C. curvaria (Curran, 1941)
- C. inarmatus (Hunter, 1897)
- C. libo (Walker, 1849)
- C. metallifer (Bigot, 1884)
- C. nemorum (Fabricius, 1805)
- C. piger (Fabricius, 1794)
- C. plesia (Curran, 1925)
- C. vecors (Osten Sacken 1875)

==== Genus Criorhina ====
- Criorhina verbosa (Walker, 1849) The Hairy-cheeked Bumble Fly is an uncommon species.
- Criorhina nigriventris (Walton, 1911) The Bare-cheeked Bumble Fly is an uncommon species.

==== Genus Cynorhinella ====
Cynorhinella (Curran, 1922) is a rare genus in New York with a single species.

- Cynorhinella longinasus (Shannon, 1924) The Eastern Longnose Fly is a rare species.

==== Genus Hadromyia ====
Hadromyia (Williston, 1882) a single species in New York

- Hadromyia aepalius (Walker, 1849) Sterling Quicksilver Fly is a rare species.

==== Genus Lejota ====
Lejota (Róndani, 1857) has two uncommon species in New York.

- Lejota aerea (Loew 1872) The Golden Trunksitter is an uncommon species
- Lejota cyanea (Smith 1912) The Cobalt Trunksitter is an uncommon species.

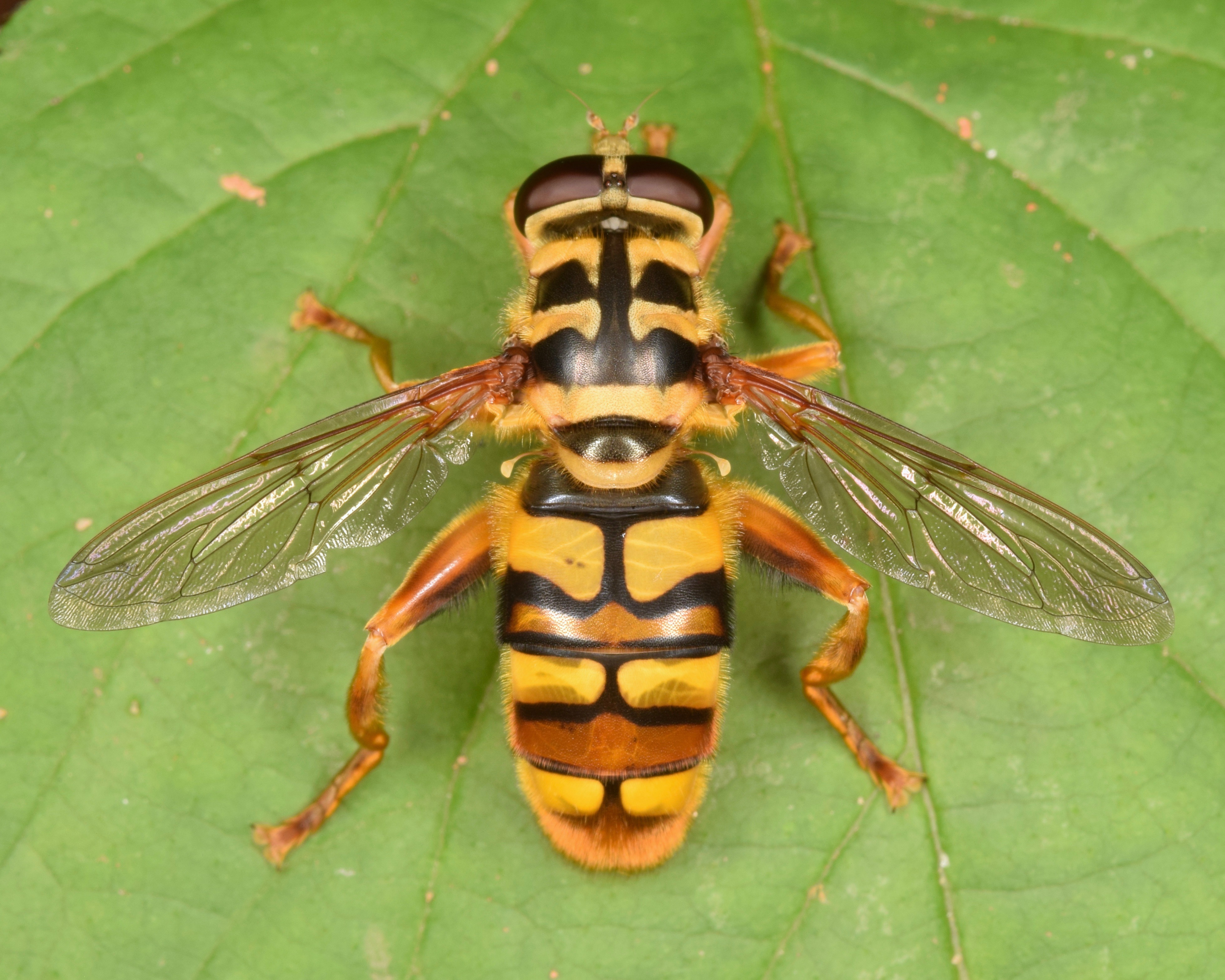
Milesia virginiensis

==== Genus Milesia ====
Milesia (Latreille, 1804) represented by a single, vivid species.

- Milesia virginiensis (Drury, 1773) The Virginia Giant is an uncommon species.

==== Genus Pterallastes ====
Pterallastes (Loew, 1863)

- Pterallastes thoracicus (Loew 1863) The Goldenback Fly is an uncommon species.

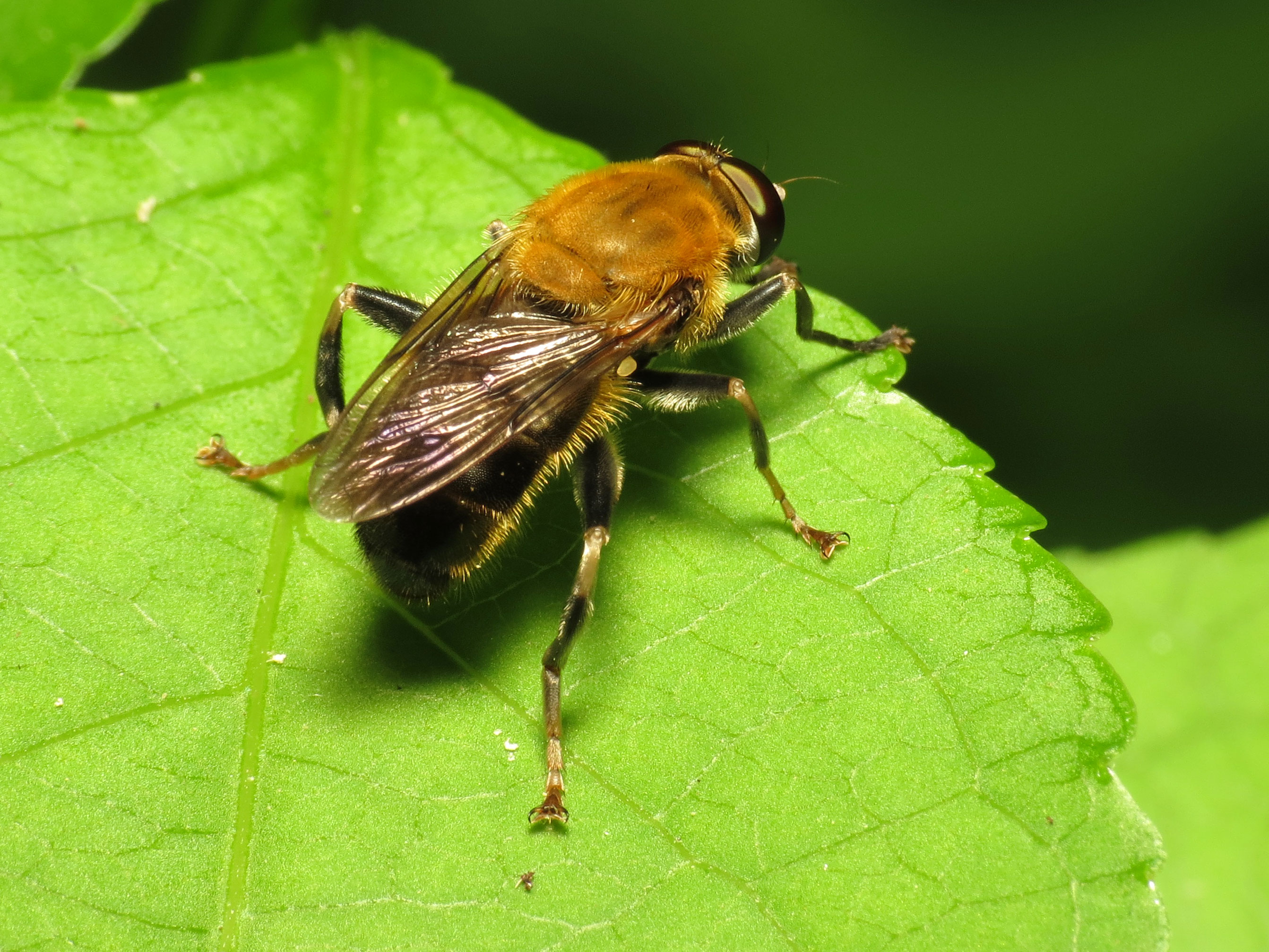
Goldenback Fly

==== Genus Somula ====
Somula (Macquart, 1847) has only two species worldwide, with one in New York.

- Somula decora (Macquart, 1847) The Spotted Wood Fly is an uncommon species.

==== Genus Sphecomyia ====
Sphecomyia Latreille, 1829 is a genus of wasp mimics with one species found in New York.

- Sphecomyia vittata (Wiedemann, 1830) The Long-horned Yellowjacket is an uncommon species.

==== Genus Spilomyia ====
Many species in Spilomyia are wasp mimics with black and yellow patterns and using the black front legs to imitate the wasp antennae. The eyes on Spilomyia species are a distinctive characteristic which usually display vertical, and irregular stripes or blotches.

- Spilomyia alcimus (Walker 1849) Broad-banded Hornet Fly is an uncommon species.
- Spilomyia fusca (Loew 1864) Bald-faced Hornet Fly is a fairly common species.
- Spilomyia longicornis (Loew 1872) Eastern Hornet Fly is an uncommon species
- Spilomyia sayi (Goot, 1964) Four-lined Hornet Fly is a fairly common species.

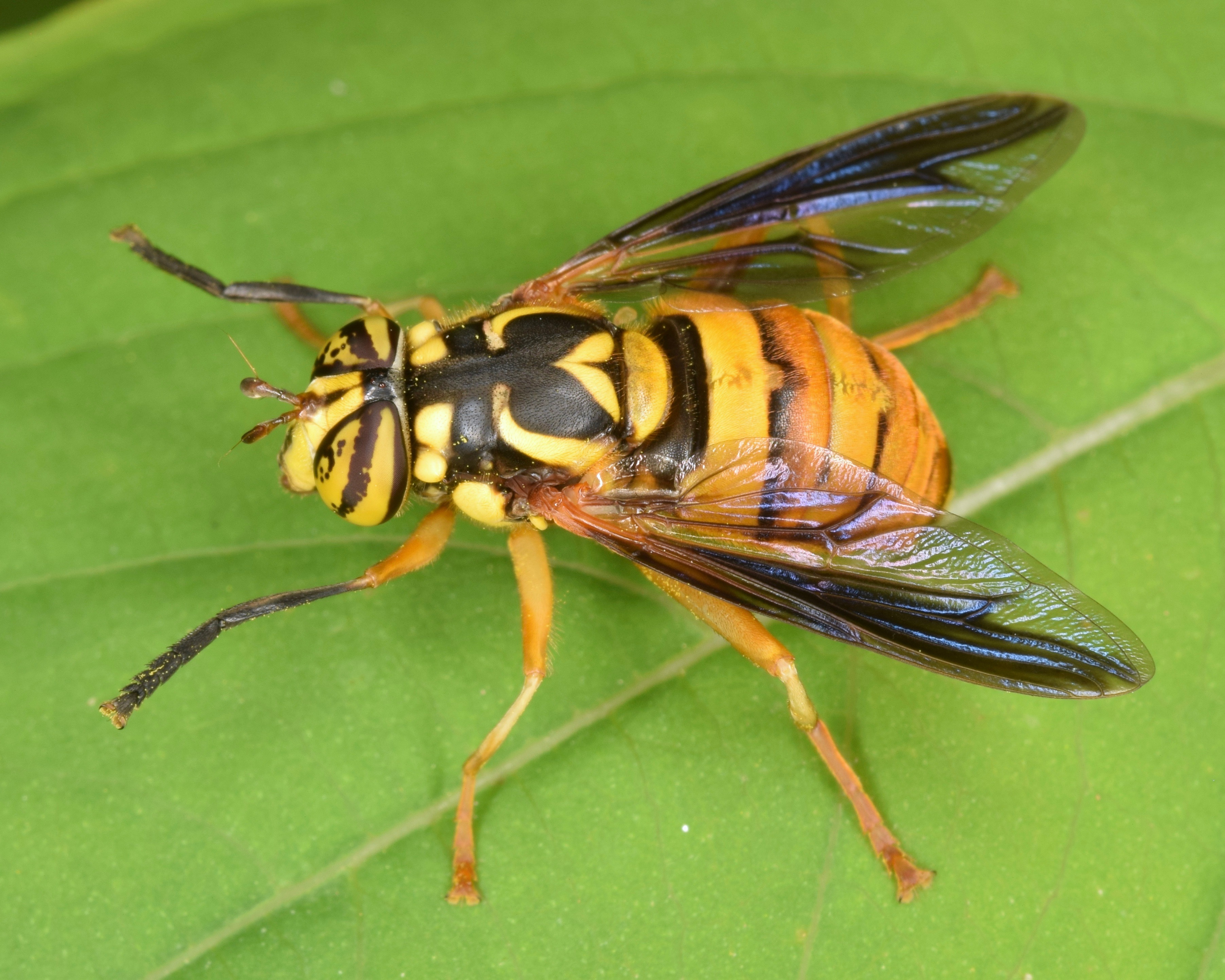
Spilomyia alcimus with black front legs

==== Genus Syritta ====
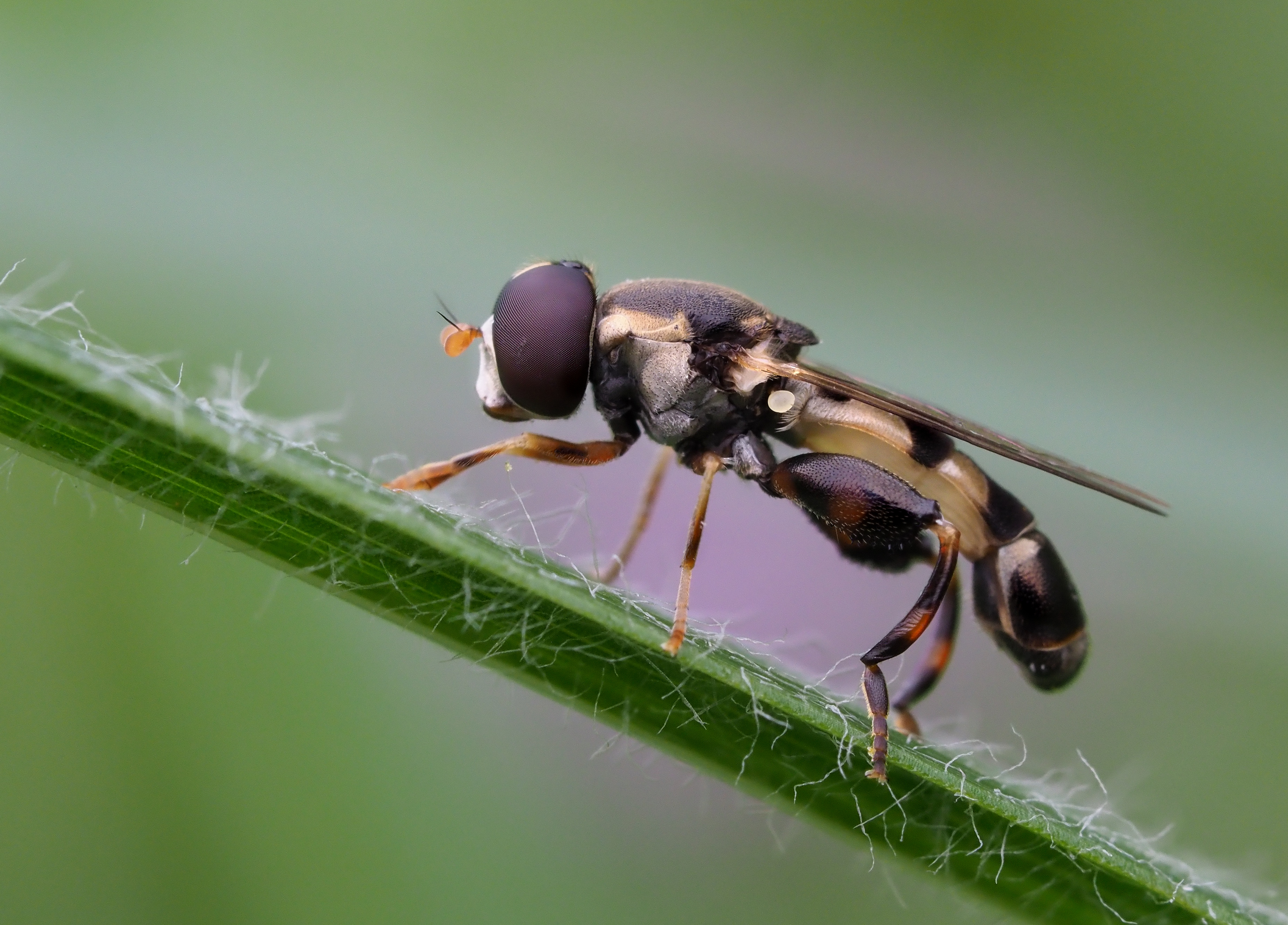
Syritta pipiens

- Syritta pipiens (Linnaeus, 1758 ) The Common Compost Fly is a very common species.

==== Genus Temnostoma ====
- Temnostoma alternans Loew, 1864
- Temnostoma balyras (Walker, 1849)
- Temnostoma barberi Curran, 1939
- Temnostoma daochus (Walker, 1849)
- Temnostoma excentricum Harris, 1841
- Temnostoma trifasciatum Robertson, 1901
- Temnostoma venustum Williston, 1887

==== Genus Teuchocnemis ====
Teuchocnemis (Osten-Sacken, 1876) species are more commonly found south of New York.

- Teuchocnemis bacuntius (Walker, 1849) The Orange Spur Fly is a rare species.
- Teuchocnemis lituratus (Loew, 1863) The Black Spur Fly is an uncommon species.

==== Genus Tropidia ====
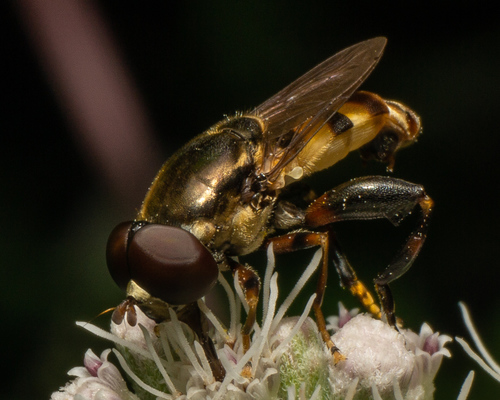
Tropidia albistylum

- Tropidia albistylum (Macquart, 1847) The Yellow-thighed Thickleg Fly is a rare species
- Tropidia calcarata (Williston, 1887) The Lily-loving Thickleg Fly is a rare species.
- Tropidia quadrata (Say, 1824) The Common Thickleg Fly is a common species.

==== Genus Xylota ====
- Xylota angustiventris Loew, 1866
- Xylota annulifera Bigot, 1884
- Xylota bicolor Loew, 1864
- Xylota confusa Shannon, 1926
- Xylota ejuncida Say, 1824
- Xylota flavifrons Walker, 1849
- Xylota hinei (Curran, 1941)
- Xylota naknek Shannon, 1926
- Xylota quadrimaculata Loew, 1866
- Xylota segnis (Linnaeus, 1758)
- Xylota subfasciata Loew, 1866

=== Tribe Rhingiini ===
This tribe contains 5 genera and 8 species found in New York State

Genera table
Genus	authority	common name	# in N.Y.	Defining characteristics
Cheilosia	Meigen, 1822[	blacklet	4 *	Small black flies with grooves along margin of face below the antennae. The face is distinctly tuberculate with a notched oral cavity.
Ferdinandea	(Loew, 1863	Copperback	1	striped scutum, bristles on scutum and scutellum
Hiatomyia	Shannon, 1922	Deltawing	1	small black flies with bare eyes and plumose arista
Pelecocera	(Meigen, 1822	Bighorn Fly	1	Small flies with an elongate abdomen, flagellum terminal style with an enlarged base
Rhingia	Scopoli, 1763	Snout Fly	1	very long, forward directed snout and a black with large yellow spotted abdomen.
				* additional species of cheilosia are likely to be found in New York.

==== Genus Cheilosia ====
This is a very large genus of little black flies with larvae feeding on plants or fungi.

Species observed in New York

- Cheilosia latrans
- Cheilosia orilliaensis
- Cheilosia pallipes
- Cheilosia prima

Species observed next to New York

- Cheilosia albitarsis
- Cheilosia caltha
- Cheilosia capillata
- Cheilosia rita
- Cheilosia shannoni

==== Genus Ferdinandea ====
Ferdinandea (Róndani, 1844) has a single species in New York with a second species, Ferdinandea croesus, reported but the identity is not confirmed.

- Ferdinandea buccata (Loew, 1863) The Common Copperback a fairly common species.

==== Genus Hiatomyia ====
- Hiatomyia cyanescens (Hunter, 1896) no page The Azure Deltawing an uncommon species.

==== Genus Pelecocera ====
Pelecocera (Meigen, 1822) only reported from Long Island but may be more common as the small size and habit of staying in low lying flowers may make this fly under-reported.

- Pelecocera pergandei.(Williston, 1884) The Eastern Bighorn Fly is a very rare species.

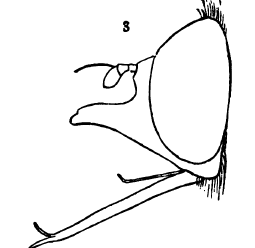
Rhingia nasica male

==== Genus Rhingia ====
Rhingia(Scopoli, 1763) has only one species in North America.

- Rhingia nasica (Say, 1823) The American Snout Fly is a common species.

=== Tribe Volucellini ===
==== Genus Copestylum ====
Copestylum (Macquart, 1846) due to the larval habit of living in Bromeliads only one species is found in New York.

- Copestylum vittatum Tropical Plushback The Striped Bromeliad Fly is an uncommon species.

==== Genus Volucella ====
Volucella (Geoffroy, 1762) has two species that represent some of the best bumblebee mimics in New York. The larvae of most species live in nests of bumblebees and social wasps, where they are detritivores and larval predators.

- Volucella evecta (Walker, 1852) The Eastern Swiftwing is an uncommon species.
- Volucella facialis (Linnaeus, 1758) The Yellow-faced Swiftwing is a fairly common species.

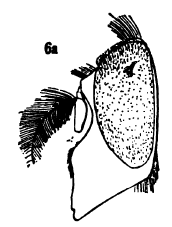
Volucella evecta male

== Subfamily PIPIZINAE ==
This is the newest subfamily and the smallest in New York. The adult fly looks very much like the flies in Eristalinae while the larvae are predators much like the subfamily Syrphinae. The DNA evidence has been evaluated and concluded that Pipizinae are a sister subfamily to these subfamilies.

=== Genus Heringia ===
- Heringia calcarata (Loew, 1866) Opaque Spikeleg Fly
- Heringia canadensis, Curran, 1921, The Canadian Smoothleg Fly is a fairly common species
- Heringia salax, Loew, 1866 The Eastern Smoothleg Fly is a fairly common species
- Heringia coxalis (Curran, 1921) White-faced Spikeleg Fly
- Heringia elongata (Curran, 1921) Elongate Spikeleg Fly
- Heringia rita (Curran, 1921) Black-faced Spikeleg Fly

=== Genus Pipiza ===
Pipiza (Fallén, 1810) is a genus of small nearly all black flies sometimes with yellow abdominal spots. The larvae, when known, feed upon gall making or leaf rolling aphids. Pipizini. The larvae of Pipiza species (fig. 257) seem to prefer aphids which secrete a waxy flocculence, e.g. woolly aphid (Eriosoma). Pipizella larvae confine their attention to subterranean aphids feeding on the roots of plants.

- Pipiza femoralis (Loew, 1866) The White-haired Pithead Fly
- Pipiza macrofemoralis (Curran, 1921) The Large-legged Pithead Fly is an uncommon species in New York
- Pipiza nigripilosa (Williston, 1887) The Pale-haired Pithead Fly is a common species.
- Pipiza puella (Williston, 1887) The Sumac Gall Pithead Fly is a common species.
- Pipiza quadrimaculata (Panzer, 1804) The Four-spotted Pithead Fly is a fairly common species.

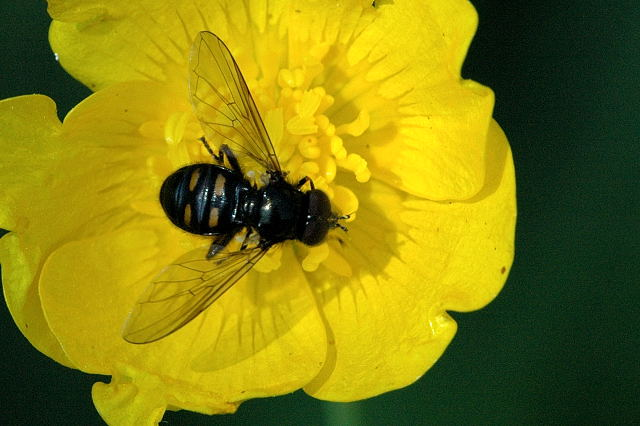
P.quadrimaculata

=== Genus Trichopsomyia ===
Trichopsomyia (Williston, 1888) is another genus of small black flies that may easily be overlooked. Pipizella larvae confine their attention to subterranean aphids feeding on the roots of plants.

- Trichopsomyia apisaon (Walker, 1849) The Black-haired Psyllid-killer
- Trichopsomyia recedens (Walker, 1852) The Shadowy Psyllid-killer

== Subfamily MICRODONTINAE ==
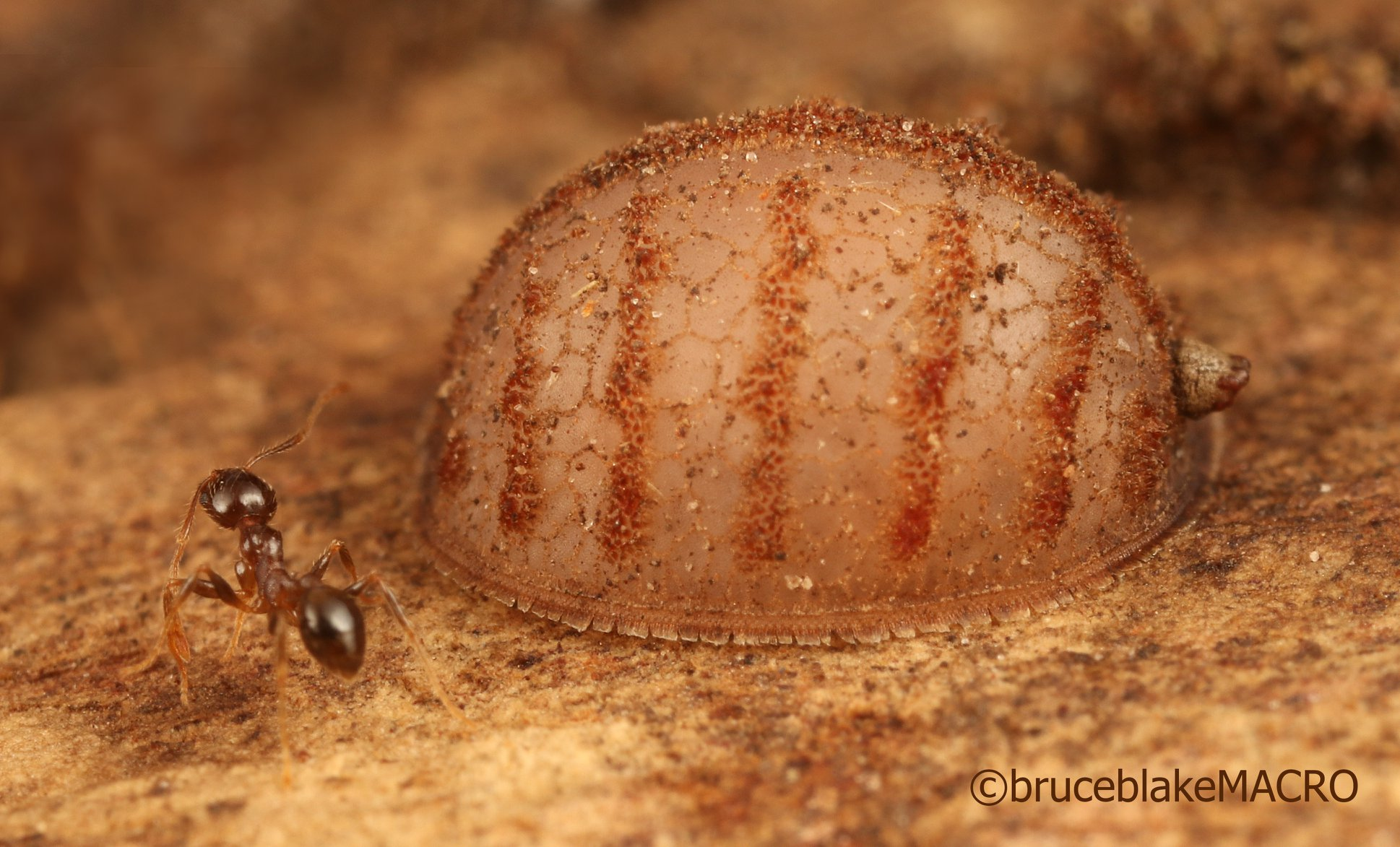
Microdon larvae

=== Genus Microdon ===
The nine New York species is a fraction of the 126 worldwide species. The Microdon larvae live in the nests of ants as scavengers or predators and unlike other syrphid larvae, have no apparent body segmentation.

- Microdon abstrusus,Thompson, 1981 Hidden Ant Fly
- Microdon abditus Thompson, 1981 Broad-footed Ant Fly
- Microdon cothurnatus Bigot, 1884 Orange-legged Ant Fly
- Microdon globosus Fabricius, 1805 Globular Ant Fly
- Microdon manitobensis Curran, 1924 Greater Ant Fly
- Microdon megalogaster Snow, 1892 Black-bodied Ant Fly
- Microdon ocellaris Curran, 1924, Hairy-legged Ant Fly .
- Microdon ruficrus Williston, 1887 Spiny-shield Ant Fly
- Microdon tristis Loew, 1864 Long-horned Ant Fly|

=== Genus Mixogaster ===
- Mixogaster breviventris (Kahl, 1897) The Slender Ant Fly is a rare species.

== Subfamily SYRPHINAE ==
The larvae of Syrphinae are predators of aphids and other plant feeding insects. The role in controlling populations if these occasionally destructive "plant lice' is of interest to science as a possible bological control agents. The adult flies are small to medium sized, many with black and yellow patterning. Many species have elongate bodies. The four tribes of the Syrphidae are well represented in New York with the Syrphini being the most divers and numerous of the tribes while Toxomerini contains the most numerous and widespread species Toxomerus marginatus found across new york for much of the summer.

=== Tribe Bacchini ===
==== Genus Baccha ====
Baccha (Fabricius, 1805) has only one species in New York that is easily overlooked because of its small size.

- Baccha elongata (Cognata) (Fabricius, 1775) The Common Dainty Fly a common species.

==== Genus Melanostoma ====
(Schiner, 1860)

- Melanostoma mellinum (Linnaeus, 1758) The Variable Duskyface is an abundant species.

==== Genus Platycheirus ====
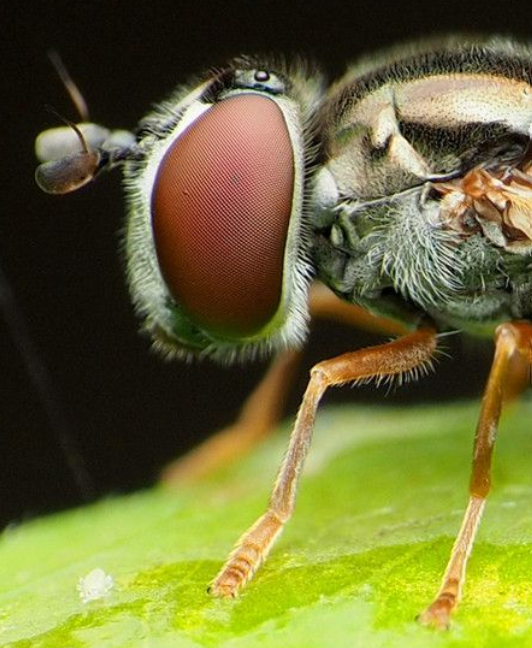
Platycheirus hyperboreus female

A very large genus, perhaps 220 species worldwide and 23 species possibly in New york. In New York state Platycheirus is divided into seven morphological groups based on the shape and ornamentation of the front tarsi and tibia and other characteristics. press "show" below to see table. Species can be difficult to identify, especially females. A key, description, maps, photographs has been published and contains keys to both male and female of the species where possible,

Platycheirus morphological groups for males only
group	front leg	other
Albimanus	Expanded probasitarsus, Tibia expanded over entire length	
Ambiguus	Long curled seta at apex of profemur	
Granditarsus	Expanded probasitarsus in P. granditarsus unmodified on P. rosarium	Distinctive abdominal markings
Maniculatus	Expanded probasitarsus,	
Peltatus	Expanded probasitarsus, tibia expanded at apex	
Pictipes	Unmodified proleg	
Sengus	Long posterior black seta on pro- and meso-tibia	facial pollinosity arranged in oblique ripples or punctures

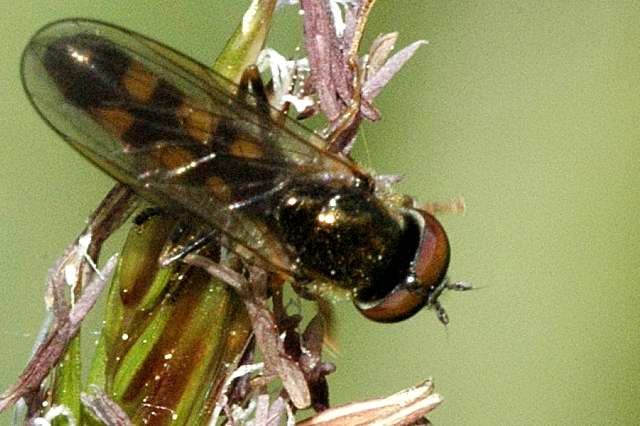
Platycheirus clypeatus male

- Species:
- Platycheirus angustatus
- P. clypeatus
- P. coerulescens
- P. confusus
- P. discimanus
- P. granditarsus
- P. hyperboreus
- P. immarginatus
- P. inversus
- P. modestus
- P. nearcticus
- P. nodosus
- P. normae
- P. obscurus
- P. pictipes
- P. quadratus
- P. rosarum
- P. scamboides
- P. scambus
- P. scutatus
- P. thompsoni
- P. thylax
- P. varipes

=== Tribe Chrysotoxini ===
==== Genus Chrysotoxum ====
Chrysotoxum (Meigen, 1803)

- Chrysotoxum flavifrons, Macquart, 1842 The Blackshield Meadow Fly
- Chrysotoxum laterale, Loew, 1864
- Chrysotoxum pubescens, Loew, 1864 The Yellow-throated Meadow Fly
- Chrysotoxum plumeum, Loew 1864, The Broad-banded Meadow Fly

=== Tribe Paragini ===
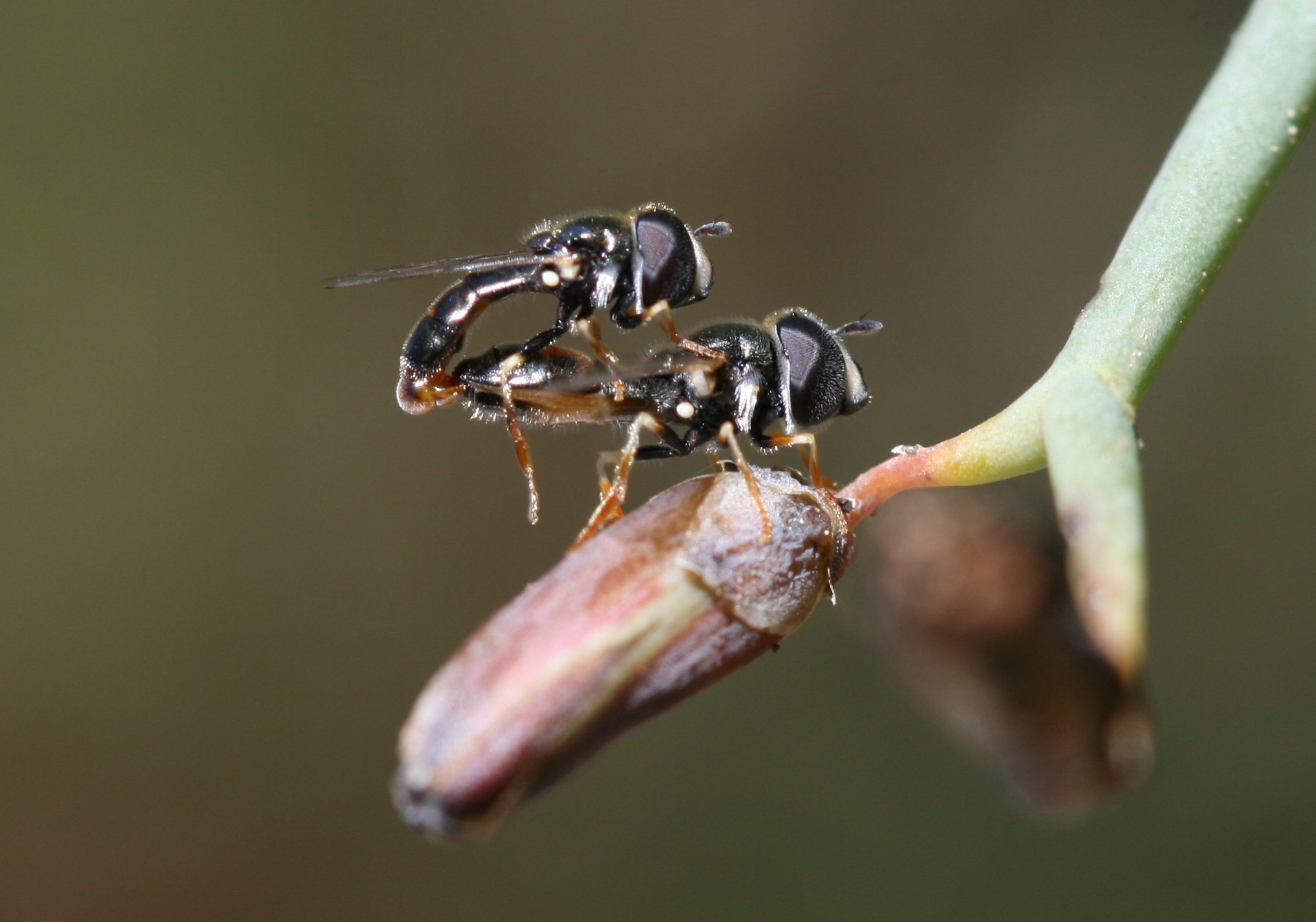
Paragus tibialis (pair)

==== Genus Paragus ====
- Paragus angustifrons (Loew, 1863) Narrow-faced Grass Skimmer
- Paragus tibialis (Fallén, 1817)
- Paragus haemorrhous (Meigen, 1822) Black-backed Grass Skimmer
- Paragus angustistylus (Vockeroth, 1986) Thin-spined Grass Skimmer

=== Tribe Syrphini ===
Syrphini this tribe contains 15 genera and at least 38 species, though more are likely*, found in New York

Genera table *_more_species_likely
Genus	authority	common name	# in N.Y.	Defining characteristics
Allograpta	Osten Sacken, 1875	streaktail	1	small flies, thorax sides with yellow stripe, last abdominal segments lateral bands and parallel stripes.
Dasysyrphus	Enderlein, 1938	Conifer Fly	4	eyes pilose, abdominal margin grooved, abdomen variable yellow markings.
Didea	Macquart, 1834	Lucent	1	sinuous r4+5 vein, distinct yellow spots
Doros	Meigen, 1803	Potterfly	1	shiny black and yellow, wasp mimics.
Epistrophe	Walker	Smoothtail	3	straight R4+5 vein lateral yellow spots on seg. 2, yellow bands on seg. 3&4
Epistrophella	Dušek & Láska, 1967	Smoothtail	1	article needed.
Eupeodes	Osten Sacken, 1877	Aphideater	5*	R4+5 straight, abdomen marginate
Lapposyrphus	Dušek & Láska, 1967	Aphideater	1	vein R 4+5 distinctly dipped, yellow abdminal spots variable
Leucozona	Schiner, 1860	none	1	thickly pilose, white anterior abdomen
Megasyrphus	Dusek & Láska, 1967	Gossamer Fly	1	vein R4+5 sinuous, distinct abdominal bands
Melangyna	Verrall, 1901	Halfband	3	working on it
Meligramma	Frey, 1946	Roundtail	1	vein R4+5 straight, slender abdomen with yellow spots along the sides.
Meliscaeva	Frey, 1946	Thintail	1	vein R4+5 straight, abdomen thin with broad yellow bands
Ocyptamus	Macquart, 1834	Hover Fly	1	very long slender abdomen, brown wing cloud.
Parasyrphus	Matsumura, 1917	Bristleside	1 *	under review
Sphaerophoria	Le Peletier & Serville, 1828	Globetail	5 *	straight R4+5 vein, slender abdomen with yellow stripes, scutum with lateral yellow stripes, male genitalia globose.
Syrphus	Fabricius, 1775	Flower Fly	5	straight R4+5, yellow face and scutellum, dorsal side of lower calypter pilose.
Xanthogramma	Schiner, 1860	Harlequin Fly	1	yellow stripes on scutum black, brown and yellow stripes on abdomen.

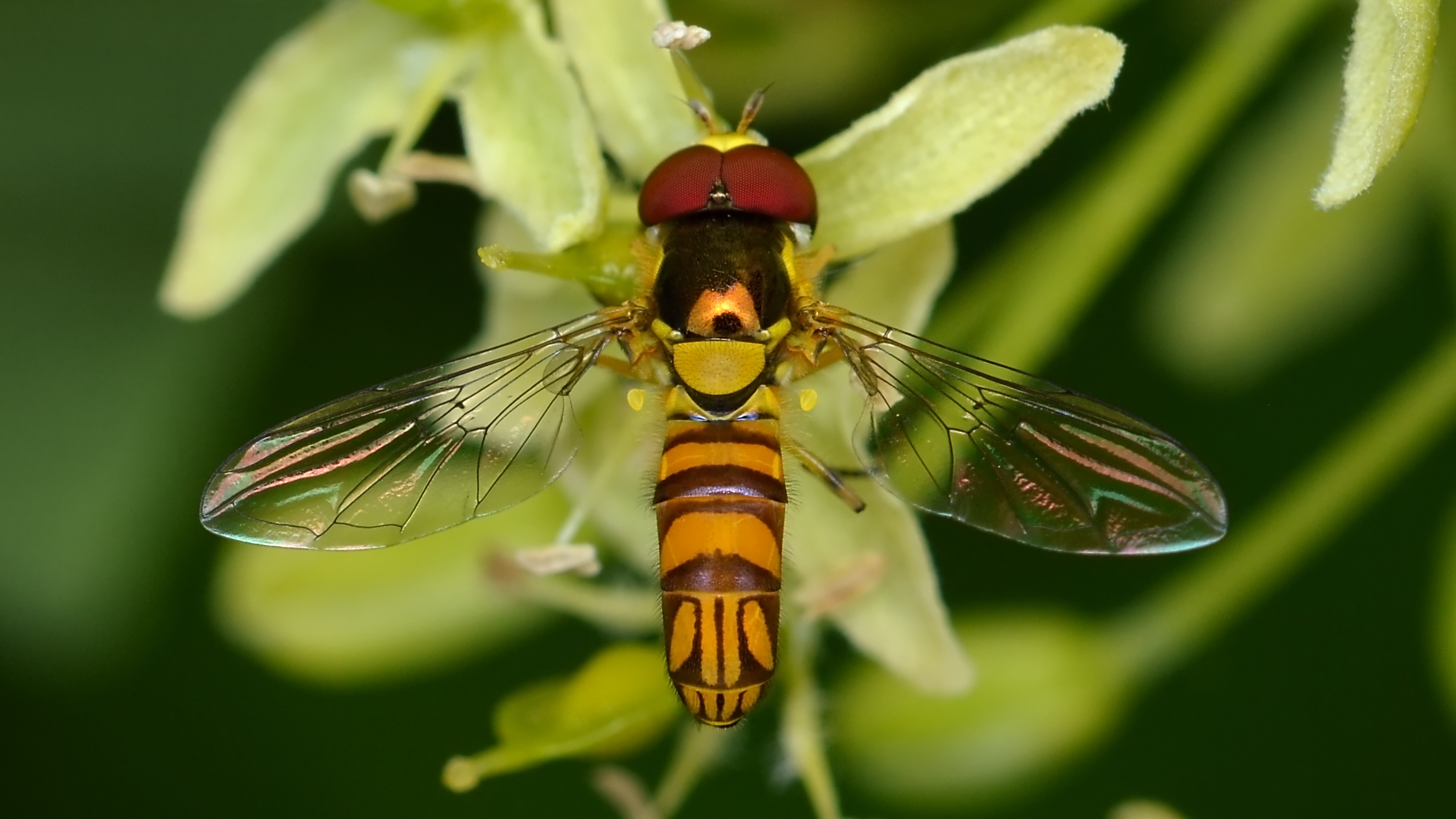
Allograpta obliqua

==== Genus Allograpta ====
Allograpta (Osten Sacken, 1875), once recognized is found to be a common species across the state along with Toxomerus.

- Allograpta obliqua (Say, 1823) Say, T. 1823. Descriptions of dipterous insects of the United States. J. Acad. Nat. Sci. Philad. Oblique Streaktail

==== Genus Dasysyrphus ====
Dasysyrphus (Enderlein, 1938) have recently been reviewed.

- Dasysyrphus laticaudus (Curran, 1925) Boreal Conifer Fly
- Dasysyrphus limatus (Hine, 1922) Narrow-banded Conifer
- Dasysyrphus venustus (Meigen), 1822 Transverse Conifer Fly
- Dasysyrphus intrudens (Osten Sacken, 1877) Confusing Conifer Fly

==== Genus Didea ====
Didea (Macquart, 1834) has a single species in New York.

- Didea fuscipes (Loew, 1863) Undivided Lucent Fly

==== Genus Doros ====
- Doros aequalis (Loew, 1863) Canadian Potter Fly

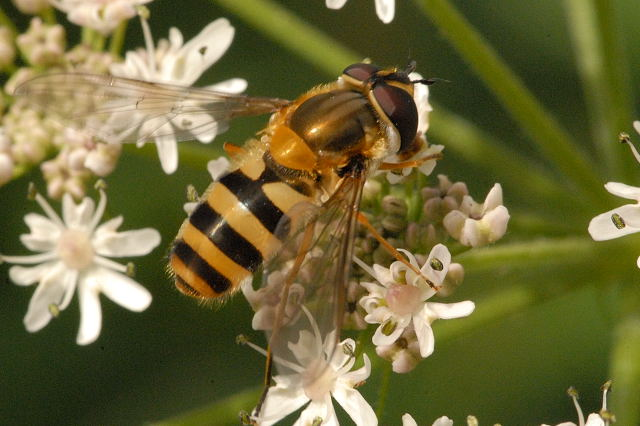
Epistrophe grossulariae

==== Genus Epistrophe ====
- Epistrophe grossulariae (Meigen, 1822) Black-horned Smoothtail
- Epistrophe nitidicollis (Meigen, 1822) Straight-banded Smoothtail
- Epistrophe xanthostoma (Williston, 1887) Emarginate Smoothtail

==== Genus Epistrophella ====
Epistrophella emarginata (Say, 1823) Slender Smoothtail

==== Genus Eupeodes ====
- Eupeodes americanus (Wiedemann, 1830) Long-tailed Aphideater
- Eupeodes latifasciatus (Macquart, 1829) Variable Aphideater
- Eupeodes perplexus (Osburn, 1910) Bare-winged Aphideater
- Eupeodes pomus (Curran, 1921) Short-tailed Aphideater
- Eupeodes volucris (Osten Sacken, 1877) bird hoverfly

==== Genus Lapposyrphus ====
- Lapposyrphus lapponicus (Zetterstedt, 1838) Common Loopwing Aphideater

==== Genus Leucozona ====
Leucozona (Schiner, 1860) with one distinct species in New York. Another species, Leucozona xylotoides, has been observed in states bordering the eastern border of New York.

Leucozona americana (Curran, 1923) American Whitebelt .

==== Genus Megasyrphus ====
- Megasyrphus laxus (Osten Sacken, 1875) Black-legged Gossamer

==== Genus Melangyna ====
Melangyna (Verrall, 1901)

- Melangyna fisherii(Walton, 1911) Large-spotted Halfband
- Melangyna lasiophthalma (Zetterstedt, 1843) Hair-eyed Halfband
- Melangyna umbellatarum (Fabricius, 1794) Bare-winged Halfband

==== Genus Meligramma ====
The Meligramma (Frey, 1946) species in New York is also common in Europe

- Meligramma triangulifera (Zetterstedt, 1843) Variable Roundtail

==== Genus Meliscaeva ====
Meliscaeva (Frey, 1946) our one species is also common in Europe.

- Meliscaeva cinctella Common Thintail

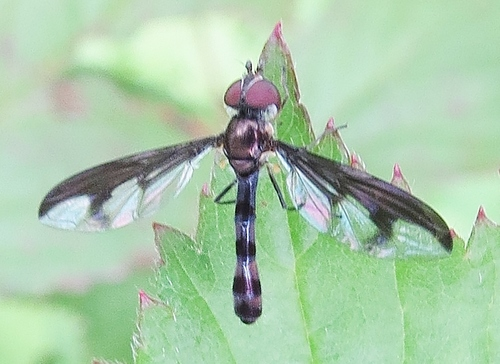
Ocyptamus fuscipennis

==== Genus Ocyptamus ====
- Ocyptamus fuscipennis (Say, 1823) Dusky-winged Hover Fly

==== Genus Parasyrphus ====
- Parasyrphus vockerothi Thompson 2012 Vockeroth's Bristleside

==== Genus Philhelius ====
- Philhelius flavipes (Loew, 1863) American Harlequin Fly

==== Genus Sphaerophoria ====
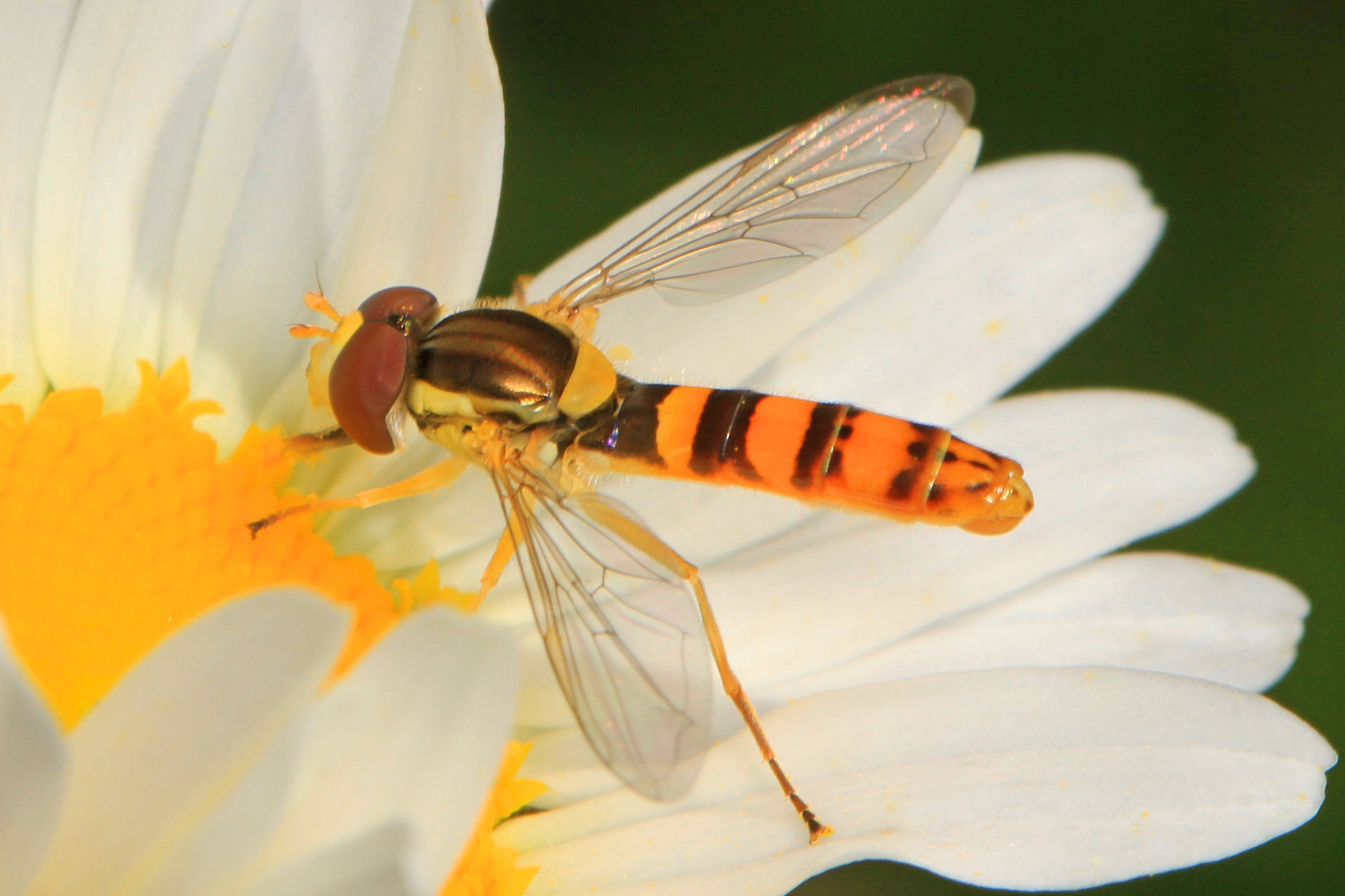
Sphaerophoria philanthus

New York species all with bright yellow and black abdominal markings the thorax is dark with yellow scutellum. yellow markings along the sides and hemispherical male terminalia

- Sphaerophoria asymmetrica (Knutson, 1973) Asymmetric Globetail
- Sphaerophoria contigua (Macquart, 1847) Tufted Globetail
- Sphaerophoria novaeangliae (Johnson, 1916) Black-striped Globetail
- Sphaerophoria philanthus (Meigen, 1822) Black-footed Globetail

==== Genus Syrphus ====
- Syrphus knabi The Eastern Flower Fly.
- Syrphus rectus The Yellow-legged Flower Fly.
- Syrphus torvus The Hairy-eyed Flower Fly
- Syrphus vitripennis The Black-legged Flower Fly.

=== Tribe Toxomerini ===
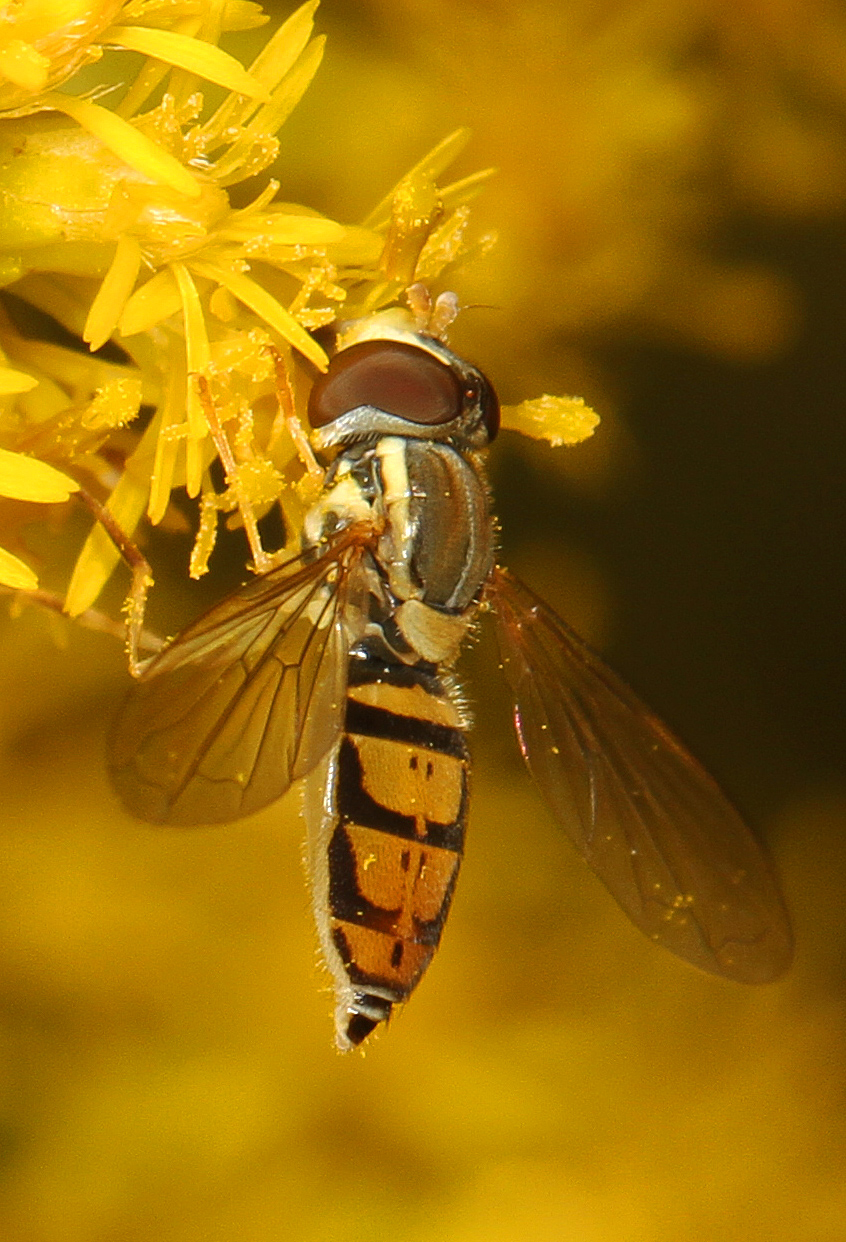
Toxomerus_marginatus

==== Genus Toxomerus ====
- Toxomerus marginatus (Say, 1823) Margined Calligrapher, the most common hoverfly in New York
- Toxomerus politus (Say, 1823) Maize Calligrapher
- Toxomerus geminatus (Say, 1823) Eastern Calligrapher
