= Brachyopa perplexa =

Scientific classification
- Kingdom: Animalia
- Phylum: Arthropoda
- Clade: Pancrustacea
- Class: Insecta
- Order: Diptera
- Family: Syrphidae
- Tribe: Brachyopini
- Subtribe: Brachyopina
- Genus: Brachyopa
- Species: B. perplexa

Binomial name
- Brachyopa perplexa Curran, 1922

Species of fly

Brachyopa perplexa , the hairy-striped sapeater, is an uncommon species of syrphid fly. It has been observed from the Appalachian Mountains to New York State and Quebec, Canada. Hoverflies get their names from the ability to remain nearly motionless while in flight. The adults are also known as flower flies, for they are commonly found around and on flowers, from which they get both energy-giving nectar and protein-rich pollen. Larvae for this genus are of the rat-tailed type. B.perplexa larvae have not been described.

== Description ==
It has a length of between 5.5 and 8.5 mm. The pile of head is yellow with brown cheeks, and brown below the eye. There is a brow stripe from the eyes to the mouth. The antennae are reddish yellow with the arista short plumose to plumose. The thorax is dark gray with four reddish brown stripes. The scutellum is yellow brown covered with short black hairs. The abdomen in large part is yellow orange with longitudinal strip interrupted between segments. The first segment is all black. The legs are dark red with tarsi black.

== Habitat ==
Many individuals have been observed on blooms of Choke Cherry, Black Cherry, Wild Plum and Osmorhiza claytonii.

== Distribution ==
Canada, United States.
