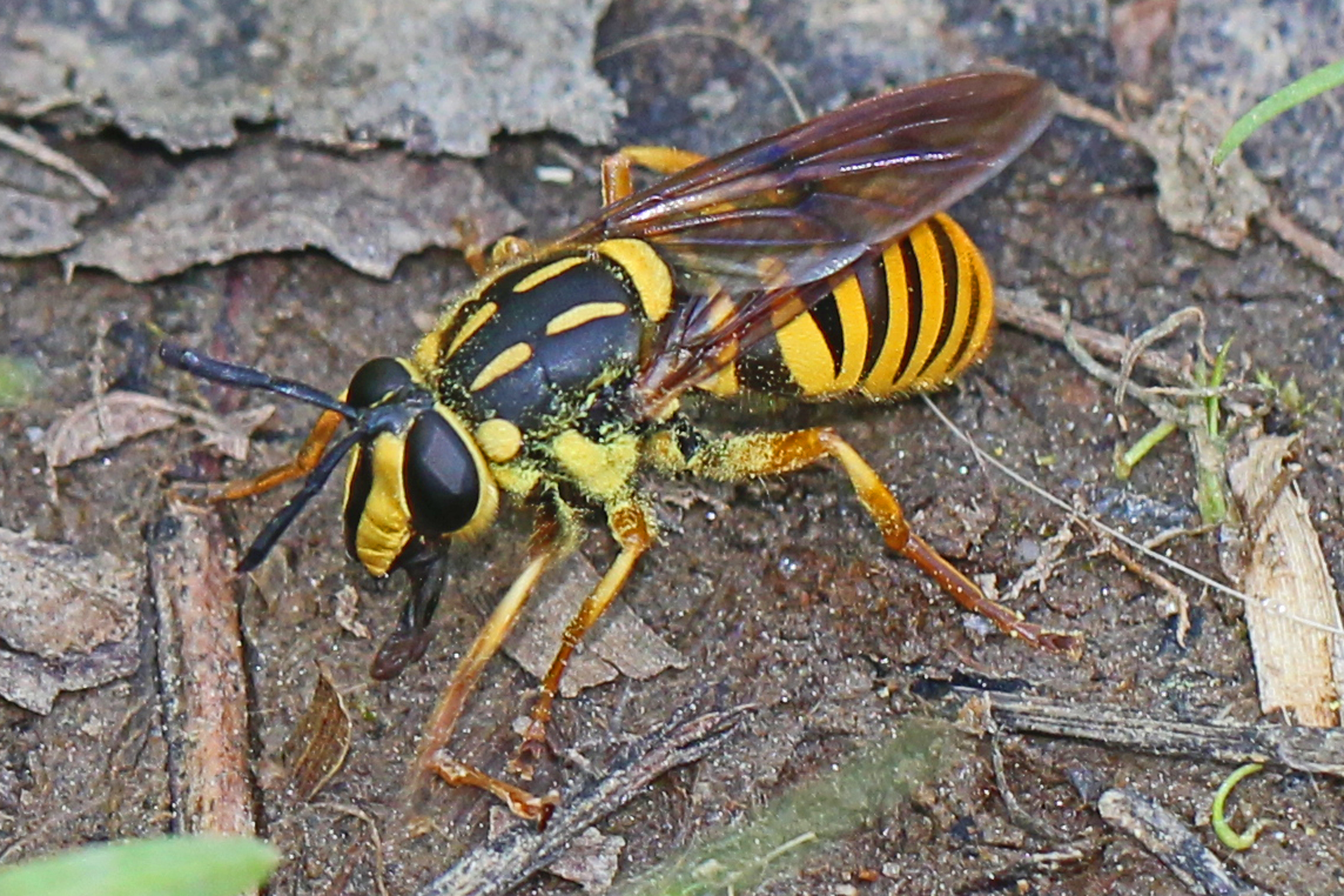
- Sphecomyia vittata

Scientific classification
- Kingdom: Animalia
- Phylum: Arthropoda
- Class: Insecta
- Order: Diptera
- Family: Syrphidae
- Subfamily: Eristalinae
- Tribe: Milesiini
- Subtribe: Criorhinina
- Genus: Sphecomyia
- Species: S. vittata

Binomial name
- Sphecomyia vittata (Wiedemann, 1830)

Synonyms
- Chrysotoxum vittatum Wiedemann, 1830; Psarus ornatus Wiedemann, 1830; Sphecomyia boscii Desmarest, 1848

= Sphecomyia vittata =

Species of fly

Sphecomyia vittata, the long-horned yellowjacket fly, is an uncommon species of syrphid fly observed throughout North America, concentrated in the eastern half of the continent. Hoverflies can remain nearly motionless in flight. The adults are also known as flower flies for they are commonly found on flowers, from which they get both energy-giving nectar and protein-rich pollen. The larvae have been found in sap runs and tree wounds.

== Distribution ==
Canada, United States.

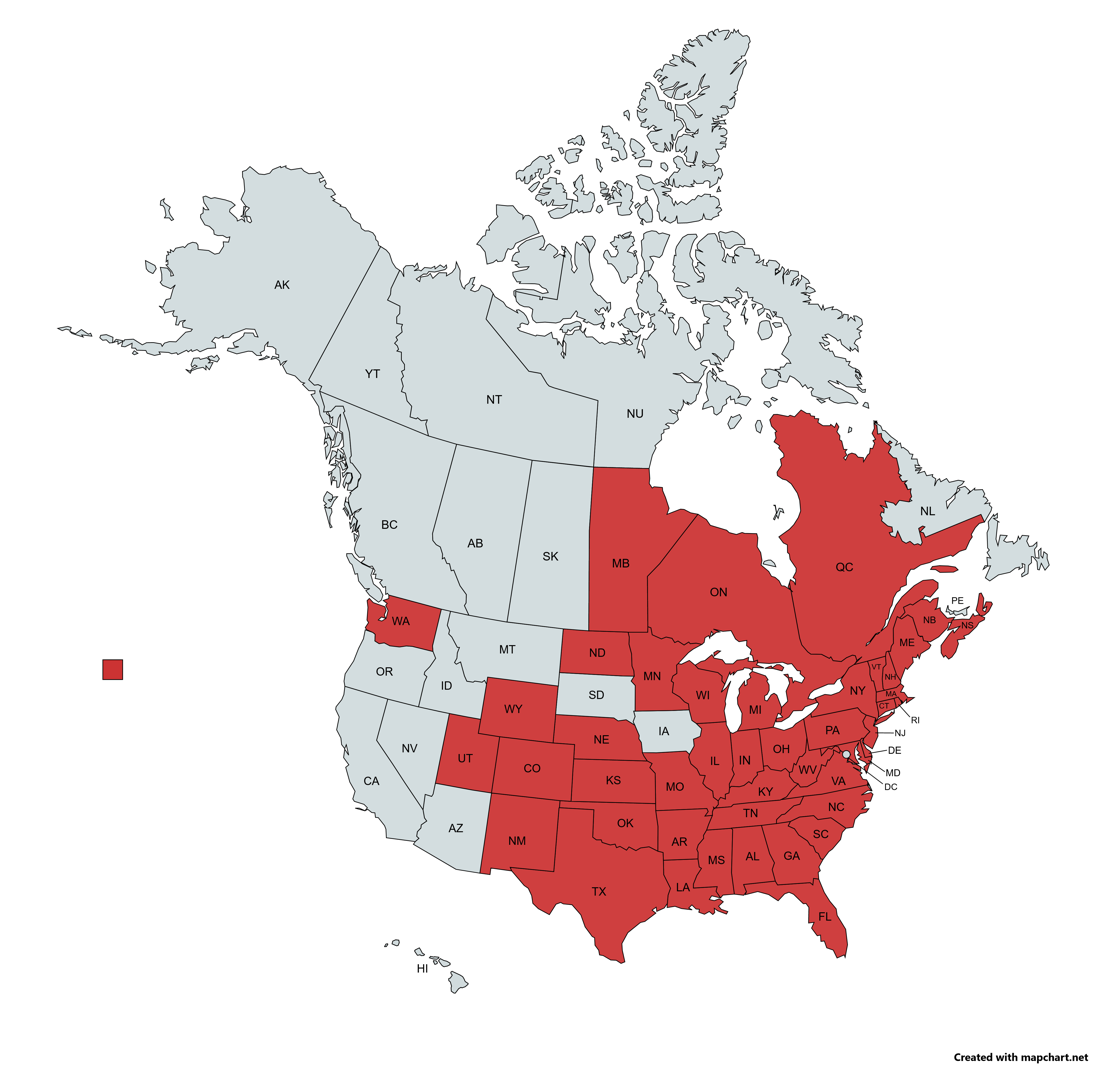
distribution map
