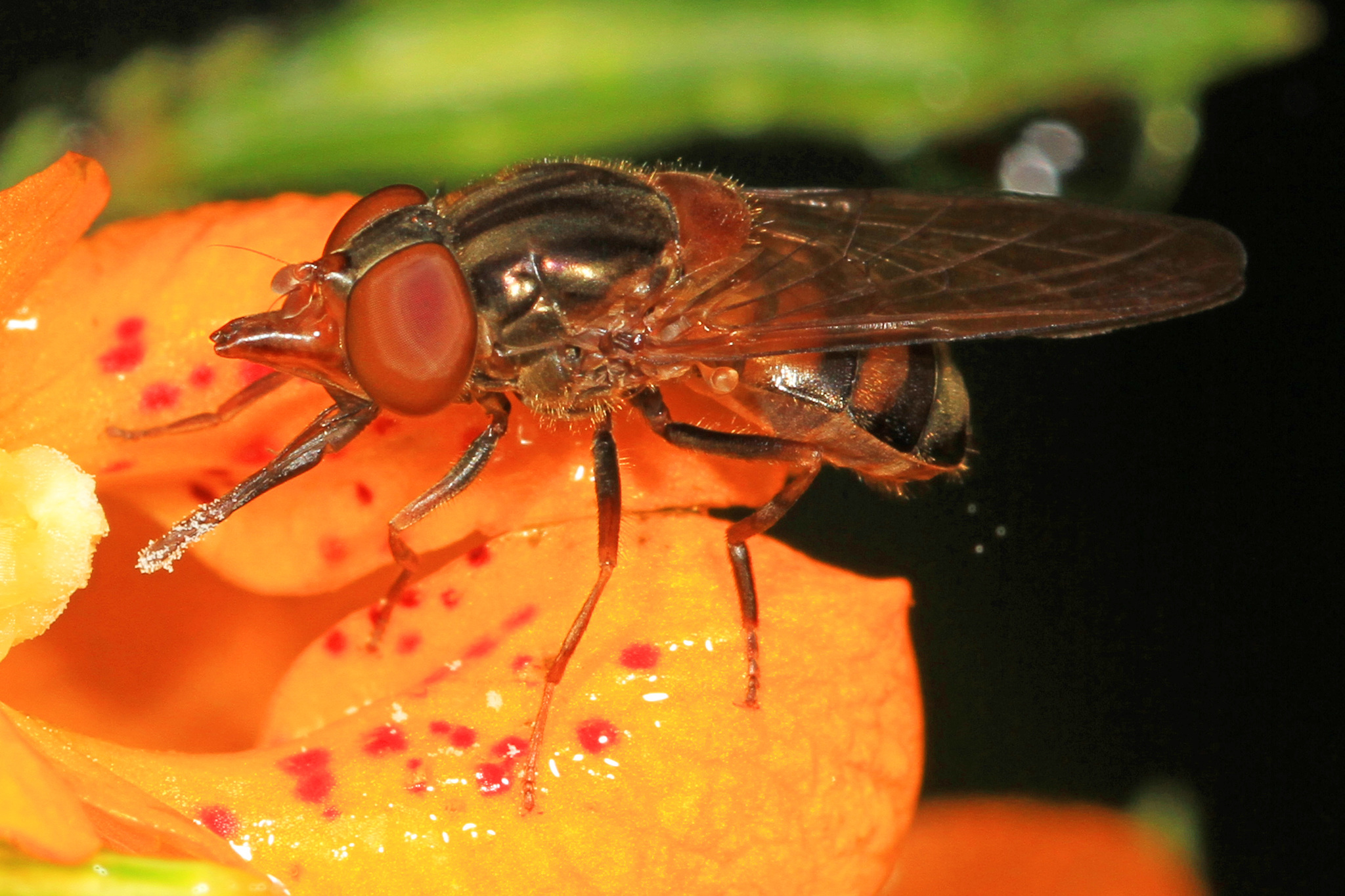
- Rhingia nasica

Scientific classification
- Domain: Eukaryota
- Kingdom: Animalia
- Phylum: Arthropoda
- Class: Insecta
- Order: Diptera
- Family: Syrphidae
- Genus: Rhingia
- Species: R. nasica

Binomial name
- Rhingia nasica Say, 1823

= Rhingia nasica =

Species of fly

Rhingia nasica is a species of syrphid fly in the family Syrphidae. Larvae are associated with animal dung. The species is found in North America.
