= Cynorhinella longinasus =

Scientific classification
- Kingdom: Animalia
- Phylum: Arthropoda
- Clade: Pancrustacea
- Class: Insecta
- Order: Diptera
- Superfamily: Syrphoidea
- Family: Syrphidae
- Subfamily: Eristalinae
- Tribe: Milesiini
- Genus: Cynorhinella
- Species: C. longinasus

Binomial name
- Cynorhinella longinasus Shannon, 1924

Species of fly

Cynorhinella longinasus, commonly known as the eastern longnose fly, is a rare species of syrphid fly recorded from New York, Pennsylvania and New England. Syrphid flies are also known as Hover Flies or Flower Flies because the adults are frequently found hovering around flowers from which they feed on nectar and pollen. Adults are 5.5–7 mm (0.22–0.28 in)long, black with a distinct conical projecting face. The larvae are unknown.
