= Chrysosyrphus latus =

Scientific classification
- Domain: Eukaryota
- Kingdom: Animalia
- Phylum: Arthropoda
- Class: Insecta
- Order: Diptera
- Family: Syrphidae
- Genus: Chrysosyrphus
- Species: C. latus

Binomial name
- Chrysosyrphus latus (Loew, 1863)

Synonyms
- Chrysogaster canadensis Curran, 1933; Chrysogaster latus Loew, 1863

Species of fly

Chrysosyrphus latus (Loew, 1863), the Variable Wrinklehead, is a rare species of syrphid fly observed in the eastern United states and widespread in Canada. Hoverflies can remain nearly motionless in flight. The adults are also known as flower flies for they are commonly found on flowers, from which they get both energy-giving nectar and protein-rich pollen. The larvae are unknown.
