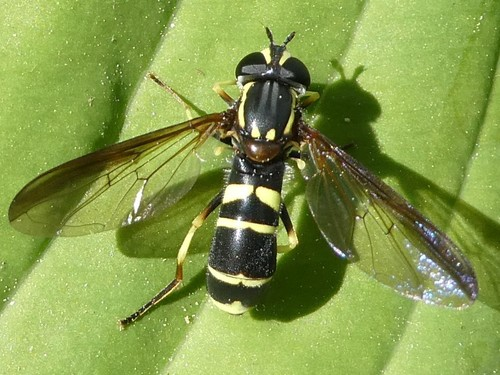

Scientific classification
- Domain: Eukaryota
- Kingdom: Animalia
- Phylum: Arthropoda
- Class: Insecta
- Order: Diptera
- Family: Syrphidae
- Genus: Doros
- Species: D. aequalis

Binomial name
- Doros aequalis Loew, 1863

Synonyms
- Syrphus vittatifrons Say, 1835

= Doros aequalis =

Species of fly

Doros aequalis is a species of syrphid fly in the family Syrphidae.
