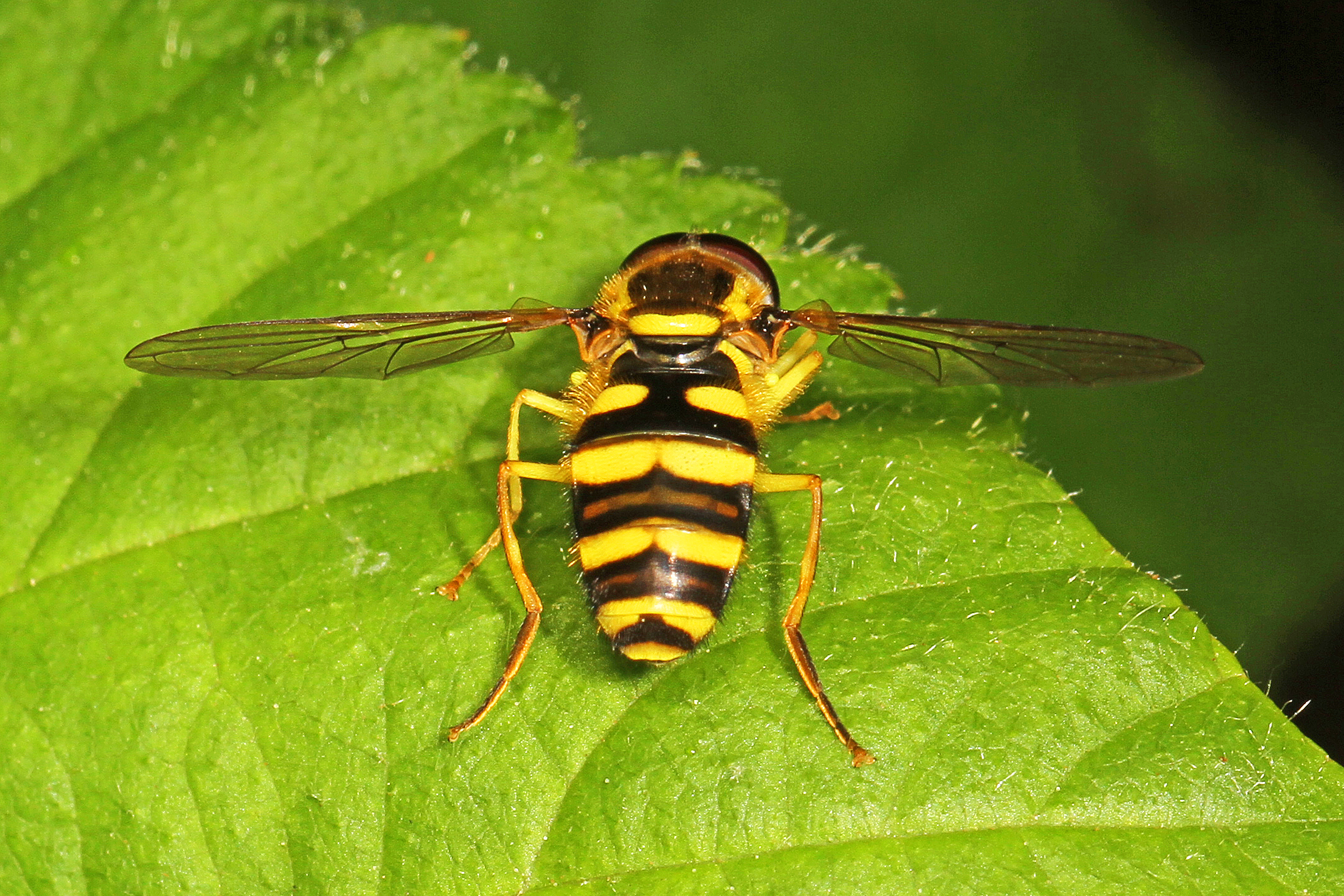

Scientific classification
- Kingdom: Animalia
- Phylum: Arthropoda
- Class: Insecta
- Order: Diptera
- Family: Syrphidae
- Genus: Philhelius
- Species: P. flavipes

Binomial name
- Philhelius flavipes (Loew, 1863)

Synonyms
- Doros flavipes Loew, 1863; Xanthogramma flavipes (Loew, 1863)

= Philhelius flavipes =

Species of fly

Philhelius flavipes is a species of syrphid fly in the family Syrphidae. It is found in North America. Prior to 2018, it was known under the genus name Xanthogramma, a junior synonym.
