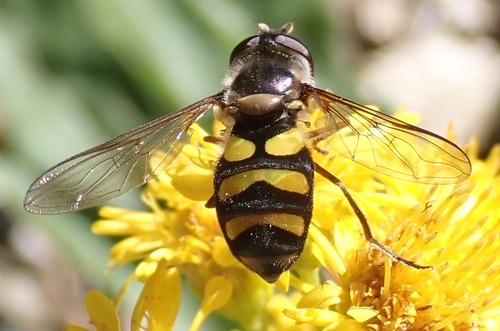

Scientific classification
- Kingdom: Animalia
- Phylum: Arthropoda
- Class: Insecta
- Order: Diptera
- Family: Syrphidae
- Genus: Didea
- Species: D. fuscipes

Binomial name
- Didea fuscipes Loew, 1863

Synonyms
- Didea pacifica Lovett, 1919

= Didea fuscipes =

Species of fly

Didea fuscipes is a species of syrphid fly in the family Syrphidae.
