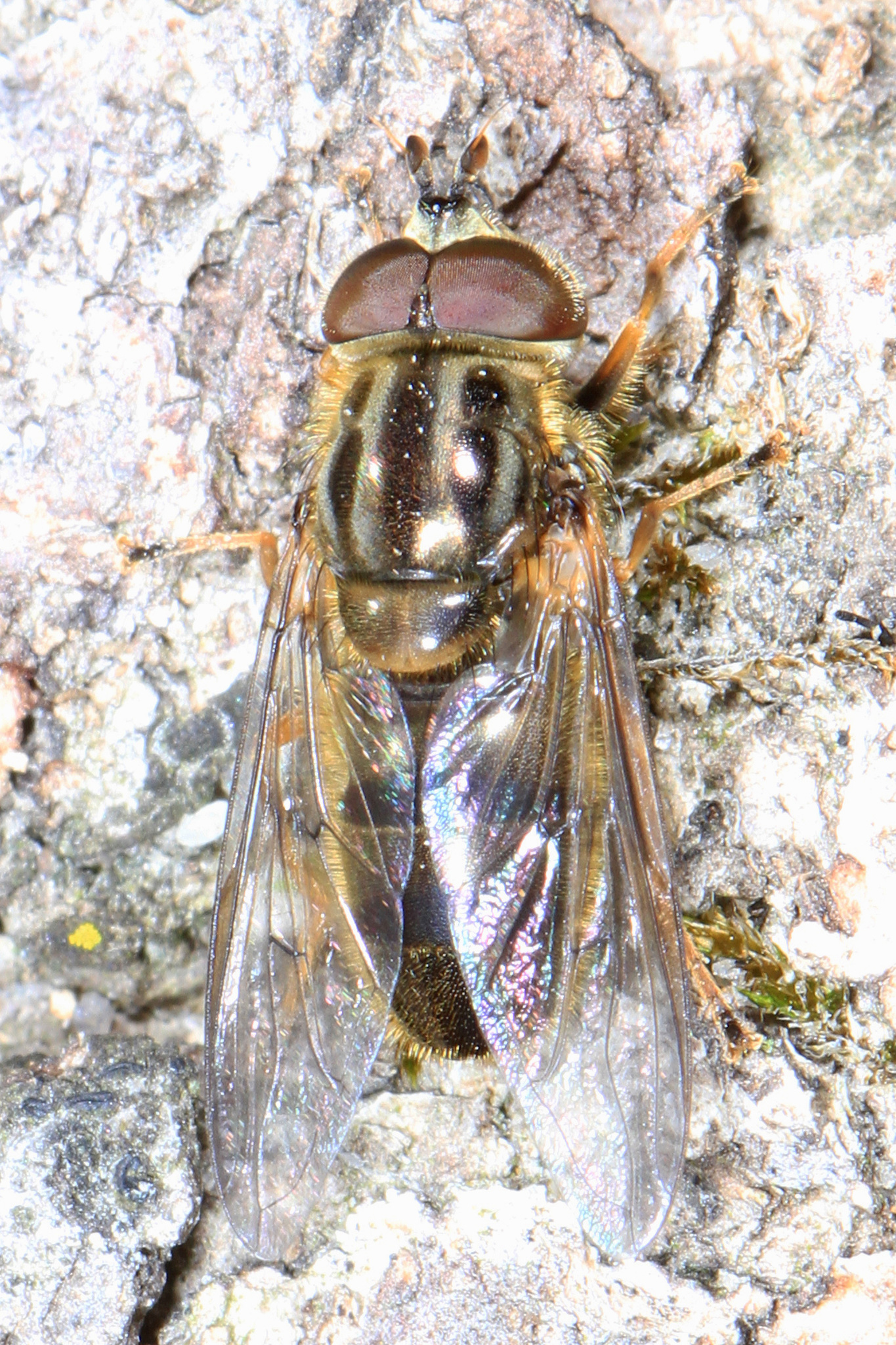

Scientific classification
- Kingdom: Animalia
- Phylum: Arthropoda
- Clade: Pancrustacea
- Class: Insecta
- Order: Diptera
- Family: Syrphidae
- Genus: Ferdinandea
- Species: F. buccata

Binomial name
- Ferdinandea buccata (Loew, 1863)

Synonyms
- Chrysochlamys buccata Loew, 1863; Chrysochlamys dives Osten Sacken, 1877; Chrysochlamys nigripes Osten Sacken, 1877

= Ferdinandea buccata =

Species of fly

Ferdinandea buccata is a species of syrphid fly in the family Syrphidae.
