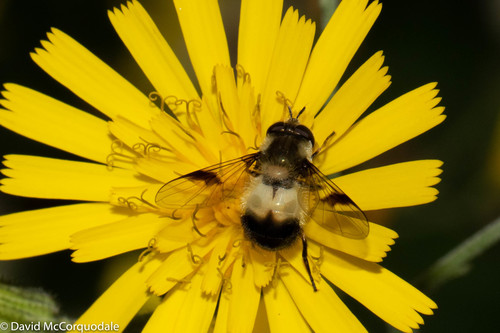
- Cape Breton, Nova Scotia

Scientific classification
- Kingdom: Animalia
- Phylum: Arthropoda
- Class: Insecta
- Order: Diptera
- Family: Syrphidae
- Subfamily: Syrphinae
- Tribe: Syrphini
- Genus: Leucozona
- Species: L. americana

Binomial name
- Leucozona americana Curran 1923

= Leucozona americana =

Hoverfly

Leucozona americana Curran 1923, the American whitebelt fly, is an uncommon species of syrphid fly observed throughout northern North America. Hoverflies can remain nearly motionless in flight. The adults are also known as flower flies for they are commonly found on flowers, from which they get both energy-giving nectar and protein rich pollen. Larvae are not known.
