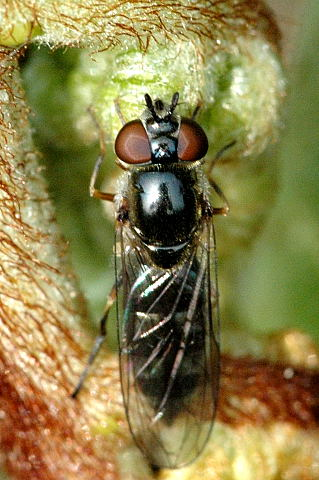
- Platycheirus clypeatus female

Scientific classification
- Kingdom: Animalia
- Phylum: Arthropoda
- Clade: Pancrustacea
- Class: Insecta
- Order: Diptera
- Family: Syrphidae
- Genus: Platycheirus
- Subgenus: Platycheirus
- Species: P. clypeatus

Binomial name
- Platycheirus clypeatus (Meigen, 1822)

Synonyms
- Syrphus clypeatus Meigen, 1822

= Platycheirus clypeatus =

Species of fly

Platycheirus clypeatus is a species of hoverfly. It is found across the Palearctic and in the Nearctic. The larvae feed on aphids. Adults are usually found on the edges of woodland or scrub, heath or along hedgerows where they visit a wide range of flowers.

== Description of male ==
External images

For terminology see Speight key to genera and glossary or Glossary of morphological terminology

Size
6.0–8.8 mm (0.24–0.35 in)
Face
densely Dusted in yellow or grey, with a slightly shining tubercle. The oral margin is rounded at the bottom.

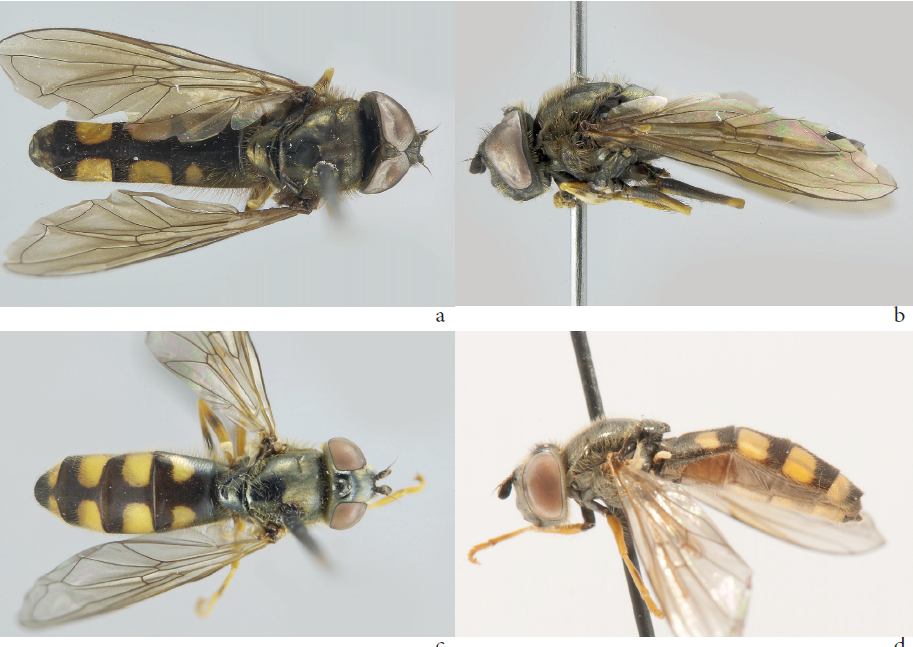
Platycheirus clypeatus male above, female below.

Legs
Pale with darker markings, including a posterior stripe on the fore femur and the basal two-thirds of the mid-femur. Darker areas also appear on mid tarsomeres 4 and 5, the basal three-quarters of the hind femur, the apical three-quarters of the hind tibia, and the hind tarsus. A tuft of 2-3 long, wavy, tightly pressed white hairs adorns the posterior of the fore femur, complemented by black pile elsewhere (see image). The fore tibia broadens from base to tip and has a pointed posterior angle. The first fore tarsomere (T1) is narrower than the tibia's apex, narrowing on the basal third and remaining parallel-sided on the apical two-thirds. There is a shallow groove below. The other fore tarsomeres are slightly narrower than T1. On the mid-femur, up to 13 short black setae (thick hairs) are present on the basal half, along with 4-6 long downward black setae. The mid-tibia features a strong ventral black pile on its basal half.

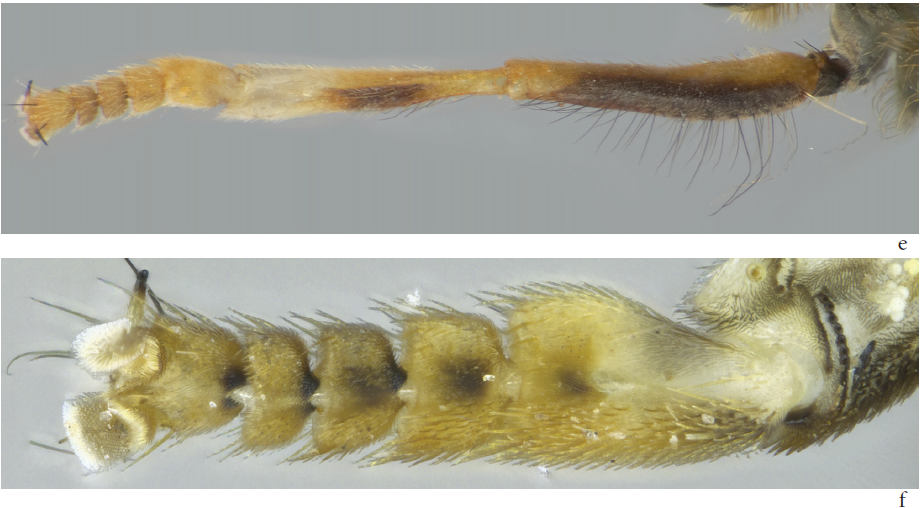
Platycheirus clypeatus male front leg, tarsi underside.

Thorax
The **Scutum and Scutellum** shine in black, lightly dusted on the sides.

Wings
Brown-tinted and entirely microtrichose, (covered with tiny hairs). The halter knob is brown or yellow.

Abdomen
is parallel-sided, displaying yellow or orange spots on the tergites, sometimes with faint silvery dusting. The second tergite features small, circular spots well separated from the front margin, while tergites 3 and 4 have spots that meet the anterior margins. Tergite 5 is entirely dark.

General Anatomy click to enlarge

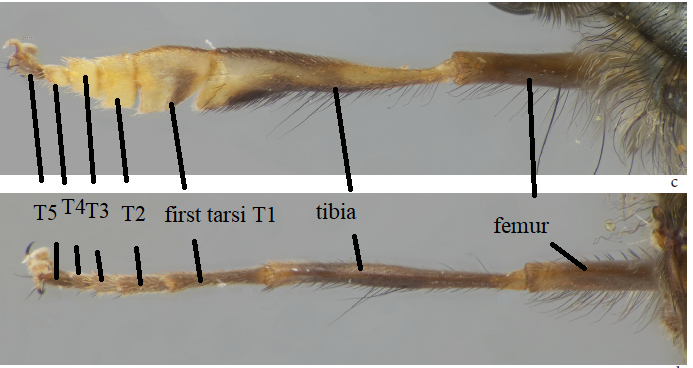
Legs

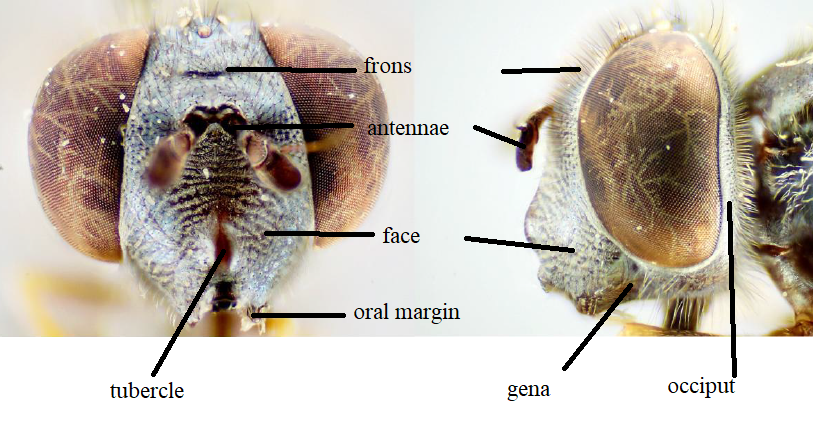
Head

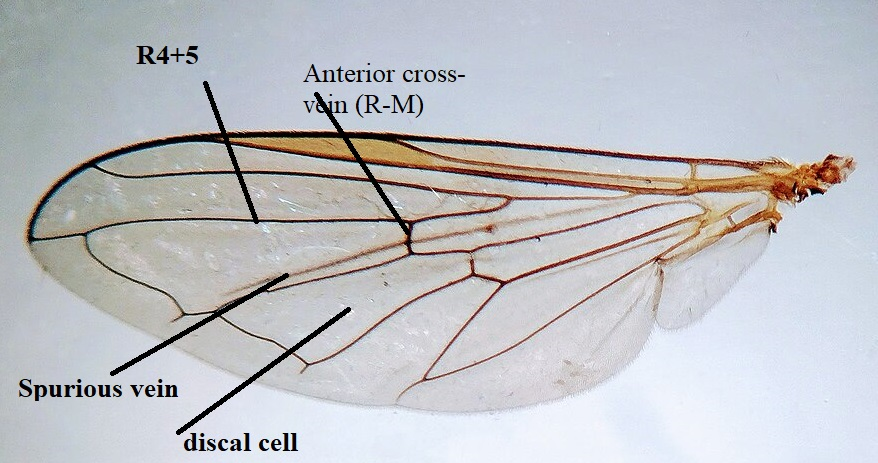
Wing

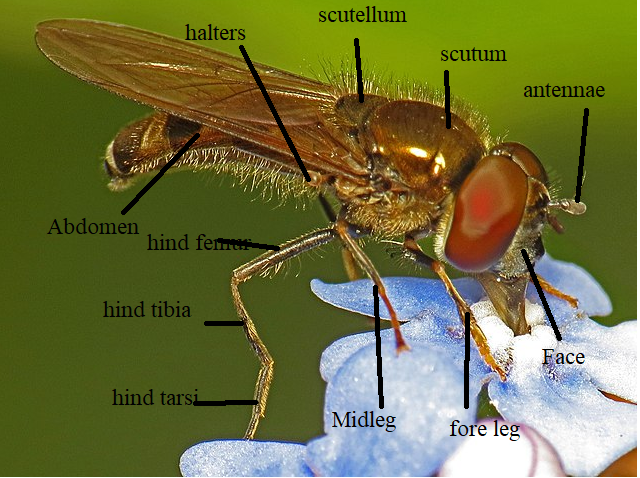
Bod

== Image links ==
For additional information, see these images.

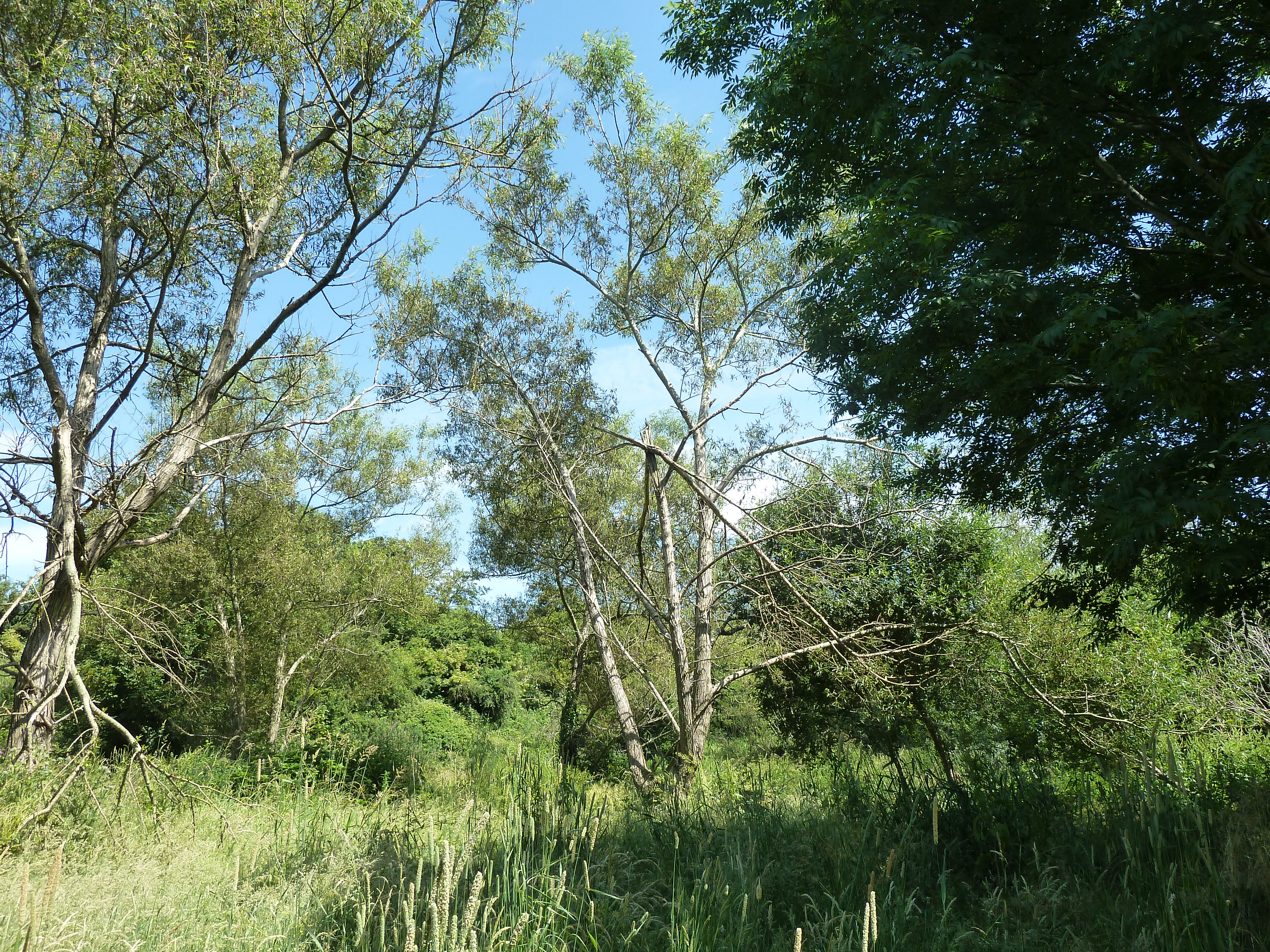
Habitat: Ireland.

== Distribution ==
Palearctic: Fennoscandia south to Iberia and the Mediterranean basin, Ireland east through Europe into Turkey and European Russia and then from the Urals to central Siberia. Nearctic: Alaska to Ontario and south to California.

== Biology ==
Habitat: grassland and fen, margins of ponds, streams, bogs and lakes, wet ditches and canals. It flies April to September.
