= Hiatomyia cyanescens =

Scientific classification
- Kingdom: Animalia
- Phylum: Arthropoda
- Class: Insecta
- Order: Diptera
- Family: Syrphidae
- Genus: Hiatomyia
- Species: H. cyanescens

Binomial name
- Hiatomyia cyanescens (Loew 1863)

Synonyms
- Chilosia cyanescens Loew, 1863

Species of insect

Hiatomyia cyanescens , the cobalt deltawing, is an uncommon species of syrphid fly observed in the northeastern United States. Hoverflies can remain nearly motionless in flight. The adults are also known as flower flies for they are commonly found on flowers from which they get both energy-giving nectar and protein-rich pollen. The larvae are unknown.
