= Parasyrphus vockerothi =

Scientific classification
- Kingdom: Animalia
- Phylum: Arthropoda
- Class: Insecta
- Order: Diptera
- Family: Syrphidae
- Subfamily: Syrphinae
- Tribe: Syrphini
- Genus: Parasyrphus
- Species: P. vockerothi

Binomial name
- Parasyrphus vockerothi Thompson 2012

Hoverfly

Parasyrphus vockerothi (Thompson 2012), or Vockeroth's bristleside, is a common species of syrphid fly observed across northern North America. Hoverflies can remain nearly motionless in flight. The adults are also known as flower flies for they are commonly found on flowers, from which they get both energy-giving nectar and protein rich pollen. Larvae feed on aphids.
