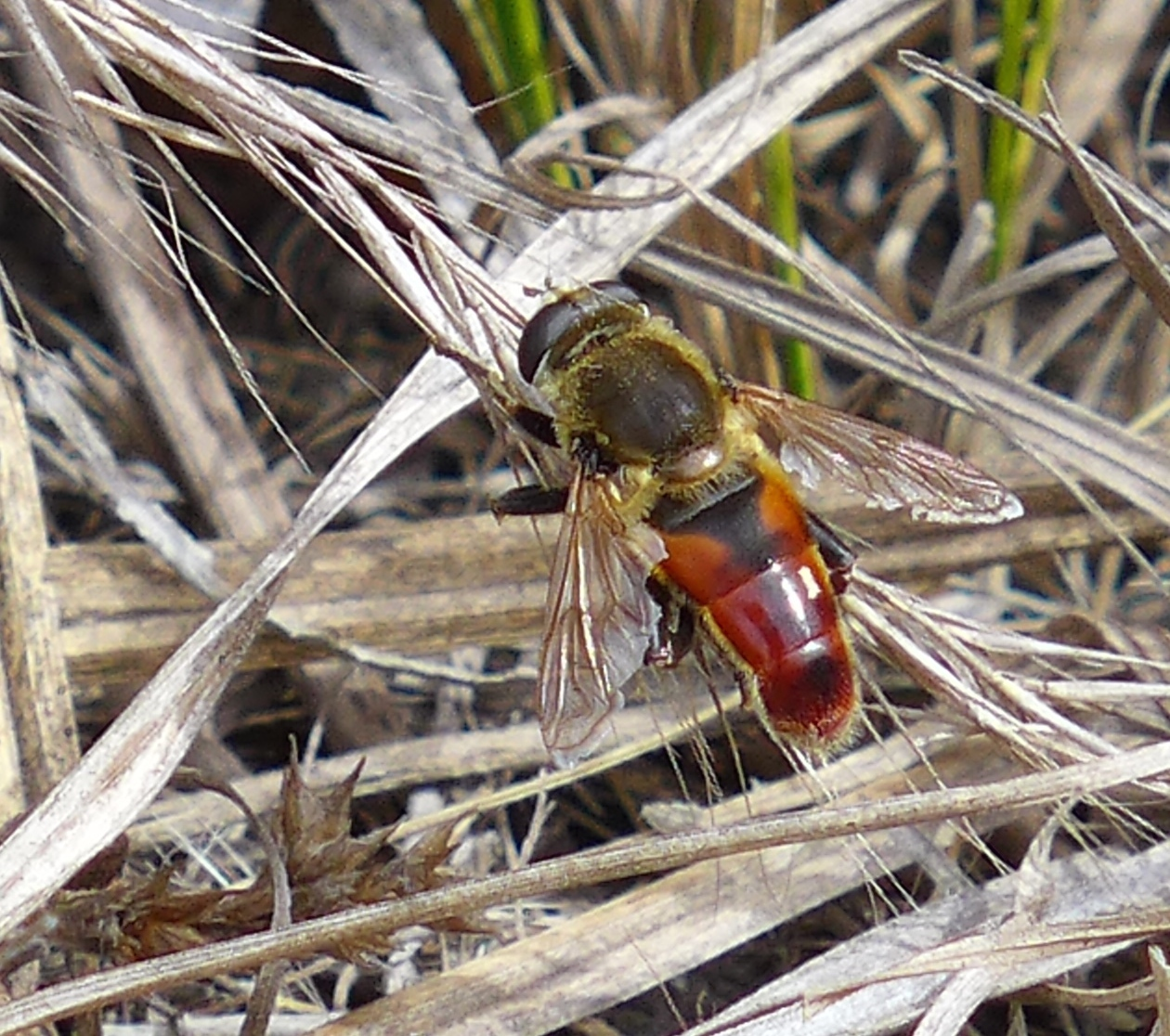
- In California

Scientific classification
- Domain: Eukaryota
- Kingdom: Animalia
- Phylum: Arthropoda
- Class: Insecta
- Order: Diptera
- Family: Syrphidae
- Subfamily: Eristalinae
- Tribe: Eristalini
- Subtribe: Helophilina
- Genus: Polydontomyia; Williston, 1896
- Species: P. curvipes

Binomial name
- Polydontomyia curvipes (Wiedemann, 1830)

Synonyms
- (Species) List: Lejops curvipes (Wiedemann, 1830); Helophilus albiceps Macquart, 1846; Merodon morosus Walker, 1849; Merodona curvipes Wiedemann, 1830; Polydonta bicolor Macquart, 1850

= Polydontomyia =

Dimorphic sickleleg

Genus of fly

Polydontomyia is a genus of rat-tail maggot flies in the family Syrphidae. The genus is monotypic, comprising a single species, Polydontomyia curvipes, also known as the dimorphic sickleleg. It was formerly a member of the genus Lejops.
