= Blera analis =

Scientific classification
- Kingdom: Animalia
- Phylum: Arthropoda
- Class: Insecta
- Order: Diptera
- Family: Syrphidae
- Subfamily: Eristalinae
- Tribe: Milesiini
- Genus: Blera
- Species: B. analis

Binomial name
- Blera analis (Macquart, 1842)

Synonyms
- Milesia analis Macquart, 1842

Species of fly

Blera analis, the orange-tailed wood fly, is an uncommon species of syrphid fly. It was officially described by Macquart, 1842. Hoverflies get their names from their ability to remain nearly motionless while in flight. The adults are also known as flower flies for they are commonly found around and on flowers from which they get both energy-giving nectar and protein-rich pollen. The larvae are of the rat-tailed type, feeding on exuding sap or in the rot holes of trees.

== Distribution ==
They are found in northeastern North America.

== Description ==
For terms, see Morphology of Diptera.

This fly can be recognized by a yellow face, a shiny black thorax and a black abdomen that is widely orange at the apex and a length of between 9 and 13 mm. A similar appearing species Blera fallax is found in Europe.

Head

The frontal triangle of the male is bare and shining light orangish-yellow anteriorly, but broadly pollinose posteriorly. In the female the front is orangish-yellow, shining below and dusted and with a short yellowish pile above. The upper third of the vertex is blackish. The face is light orangish-yellow with a light dusting of white pile. The face is much projecting and shiny at antenna base. There is a black spot below the lower eye margin. The antennae are orangish-yellow, like the face, with the first and second joints with some black pile above. The flagellum is large and rounded. The arista is reddish-black. The antennal process, is gently convex in the middle. The eyes are reddish-brown. The eyes of the male are slightly holoptic while in the female the eyes are separated slightly. The occiput is black, dusted with white near the eyes.

Thorax

The scutum is entirely metallic greenish-black, covered with whitish pile. The white pile is denser along humeri (postpronotum). The pleurae have tufts of dense, short white hair dusted with white pollen.

Abdomen

The abdomen is shiny black with short black pile and orange apex. Segments two and three are black and have long white hair at the sides. Segment four is yellow-orange, with black V-shape at the base, center on male. The female has a larger black U-shape that is more rounded. Segment five is entirely yellow-orange with some black pile anterior but the rest is orange. The abdomen is bluish black, shining, with a short black pile, on the sides of the second segment longer and whitish. The black encroaches more or less on the fourth segment, usually forming a more or less triangular dilatation. The remainder of the abdomen is conspicuously orange-yellow, with the same colored pile.

Wing

The wings are hyaline with a yellowish tinge along the front edge. The vein R_{4+5} is almost straight and joins the costa just before the tip of the wing. The first posterior cell r_{4+5} is acute apically and extends almost to the wing margin before the tip.

Legs

The legs are chiefly black, with a black and light yellow pile. The femora are black, tips light yellow. The tibiae are brownish and densely covered with a white pile. The base and tips more yellowish-orange. The hind tibiae are more yellowish. The tarsi are light yellow, last joint black. The tip of femora and the base and end of the front and middle tibiae and the narrow base are light yellow. The end of the hind tibiae, and all the tarsi, except the last two joints are light yellow; The front and middle tibiae more brownish in the middle.

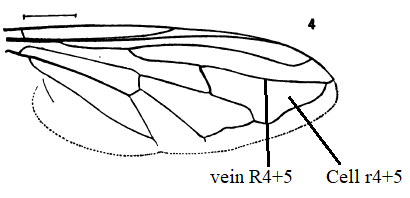
Blera wing veins

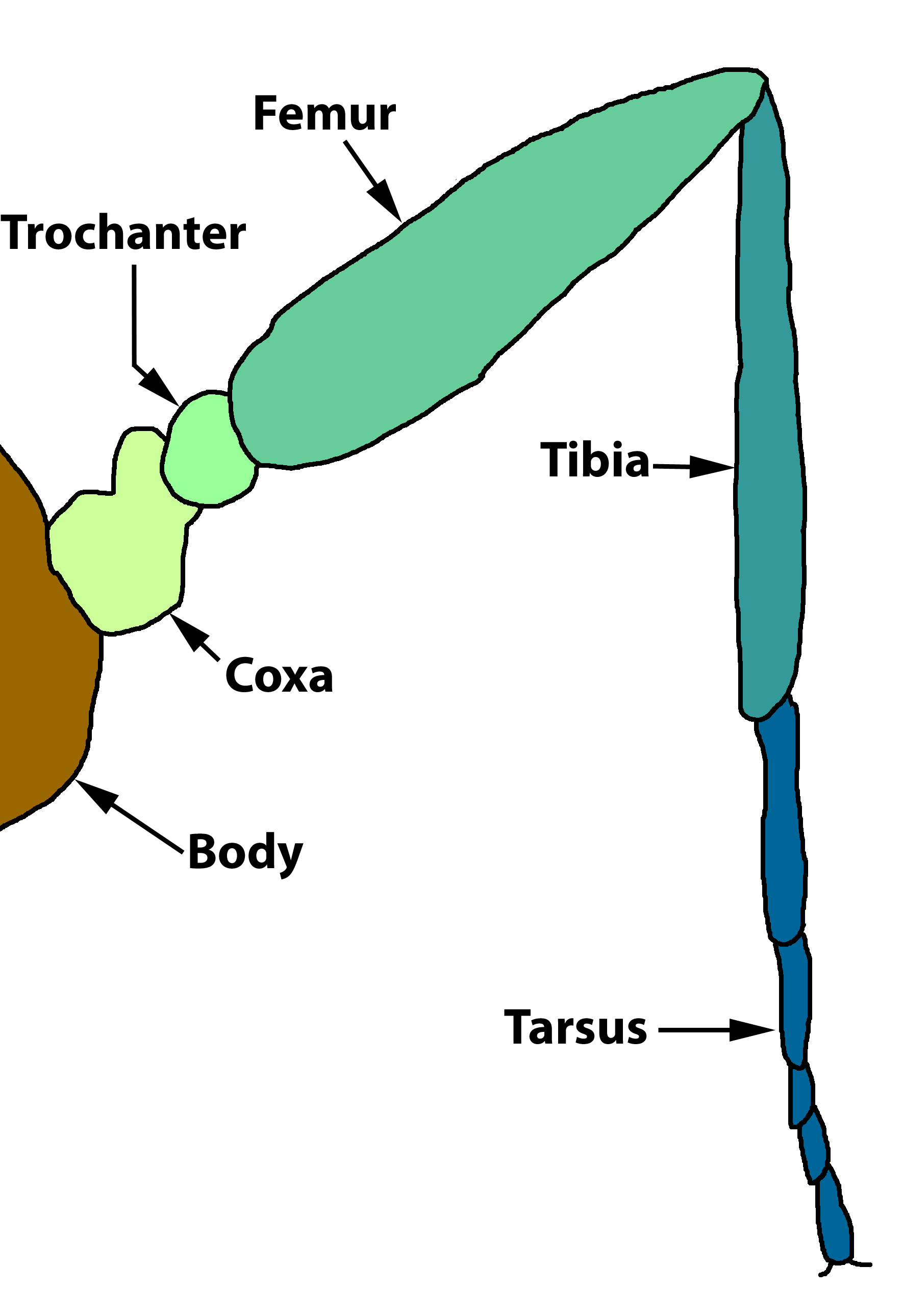
Insect leg

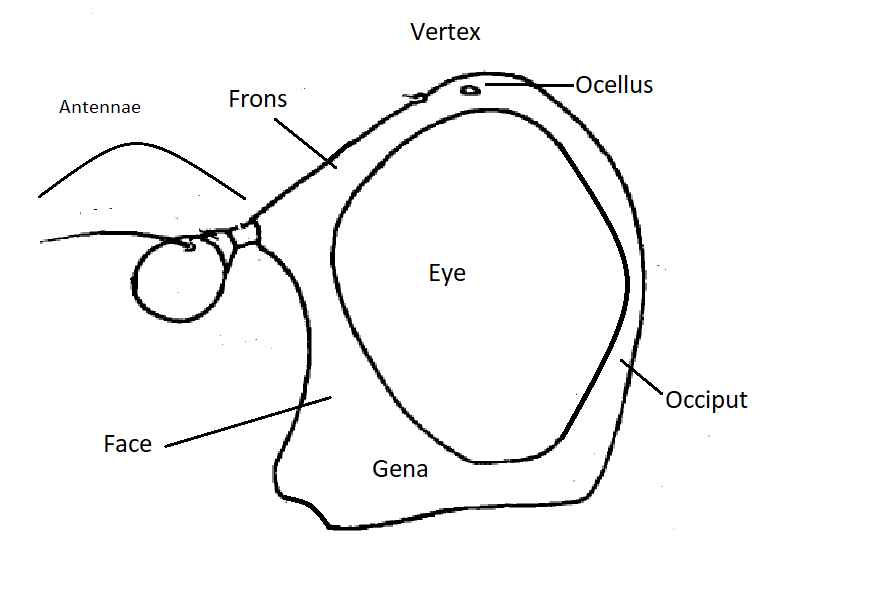
profile syrphid head

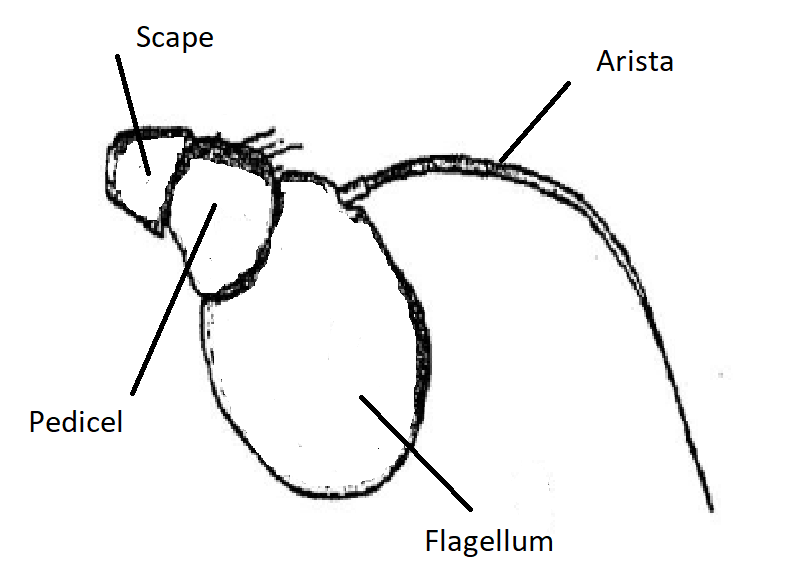
Antenna syrphid

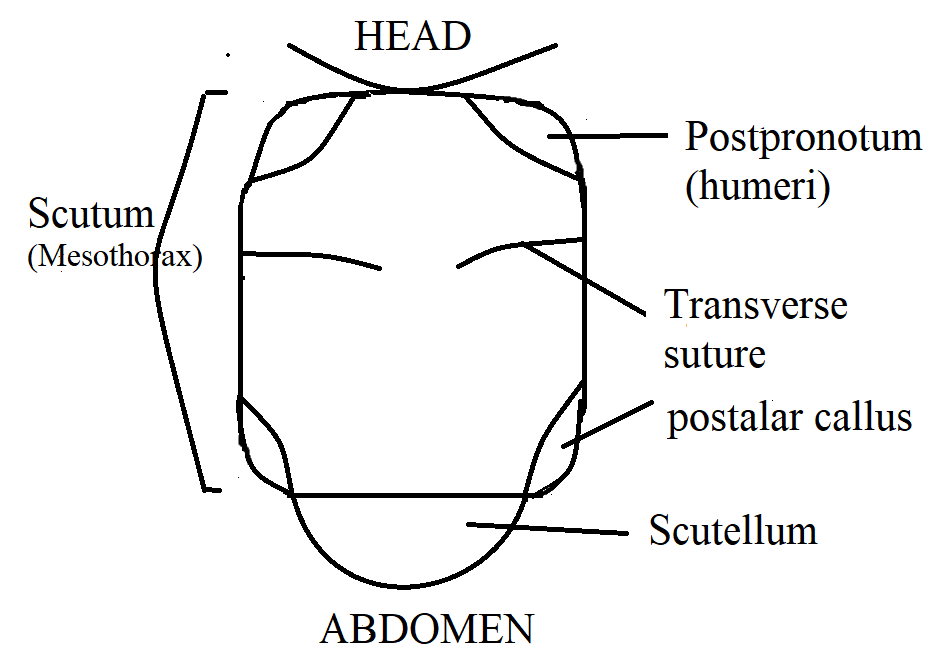
dorsal view of syrphid thorax
