= Blera eoa =

Scientific classification
- Kingdom: Animalia
- Phylum: Arthropoda
- Class: Insecta
- Order: Diptera
- Family: Syrphidae
- Subfamily: Eristalinae
- Tribe: Milesiini
- Genus: Blera
- Species: B. eoa

Binomial name
- Blera eoa (Stackelberg, 1928)

Synonyms
- Cynorrhina eoa Stackelberg, 1928; Blera velox Violovich, 1976

Species of fly

Blera eoa is a species of hoverfly normally associated with pine trees in Northern Sweden and Siberia. It is very similar to Blera fallax, except that its abdomen is all black.

The larvae, typical rat-tailed maggots, normally develop in damp rot holes of felled or felled pine trees.

== Distribution ==
Russia, Sweden.
