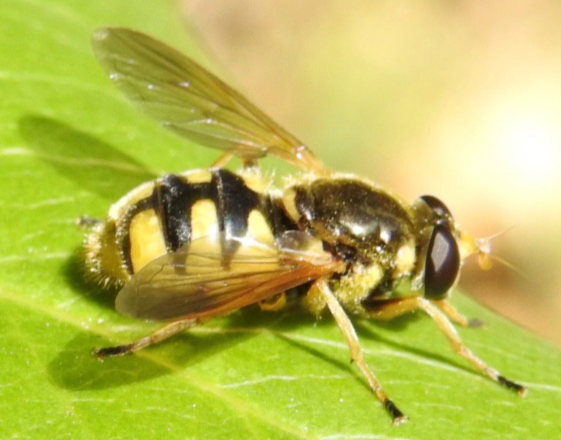

Scientific classification
- Kingdom: Animalia
- Phylum: Arthropoda
- Class: Insecta
- Order: Diptera
- Family: Syrphidae
- Subfamily: Eristalinae
- Tribe: Milesiini
- Genus: Blera
- Species: B. humeralis

Binomial name
- Blera humeralis (Williston, 1882)

Synonyms
- Criorrhina humeralis Williston, 1882

= Blera humeralis =

Species of fly

Blera humeralis, the yellow-legged wood fly, is an uncommon species of syrphid fly officially described by Samuel Wendell Williston in 1882. Hoverflies are so-named for the ability to remain nearly motionless while in flight. The adults are known as flower flies, as they are commonly found around and on flowers from which they get energy-giving nectar and protein-rich pollen. The larvae are of the rat-tailed type, feeding on exuding sap or in the rot holes of trees.

== Distribution ==
This Nearctic species is distributed along the coast in Western North America.

== Description ==
=== Thorax ===
The thorax is shining black, clothed with orange-yellowish pile and with four more or less distinct cupreous stripes (vittae). The postpronotum (humeri) is opaque yellow. The scutellum is shining black, with a yellow margin. A large yellow spot is noted on the mesopleural from the transverse suture to the middle legs.

=== Abdomen ===
The abdomen is black with wide yellow stripes. These finger-like stripes do not touch in the middle, but leave what appears to be a black medial stripe. The first segment is narrow, black, and is obscured by the scutellum. The second segment has a large triangular yellow spot, rounded towards the mid-back and very broad laterally. The third segment has a yellow stripe that is more rectangular in shape, but also blunt towards the middle. The yellow along the lateral margins does not quite touch. In the female, the yellow bands on the third and fourth segments are more broadly separated than in the male. The abdominal pile is fulvous (dull orange) and long on the basal angles, black on the apical half or less of the second and third segments, and the pile is more-or-less black on the disc of the fourth. The fifth segment is yellow, except for the black tip, which is prolonged narrowly to the front in the middle.

=== Wing ===
The wings are cinereous (ashy grey) hyaline, somewhat clouded on the outer part with the veins at the base and in front yellow. The stigma is yellow. The squamae Calypter are whitish, with a yellow border and pale yellow fringe. The Halteres are yellow. The vein R_{4+5} is almost straight, and joins the costa just before the tip of the wing. The first posterior cell (r_{4+5}) is acute apically and extends almost to the wing margin before the tip.

=== Legs ===
The legs are yellow and brownish black. The coxa are black. The front and mid-femur are black with small yellow at the apices. The hind femur is black with about half the apices yellow. The front and mid-tibia are yellow. the hind tibia is yellow with a brown black ring distally. The front and middle basitarsi are yellow. The hind basitarsi are yellow, with a brown tinge above. The last three tarsomeres of all legs are black, with the other tarsomeres yellow.

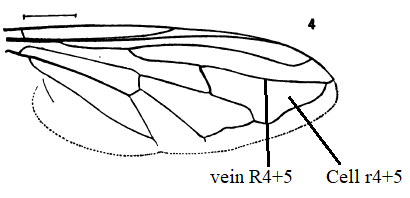
Blera humeralis wing veins

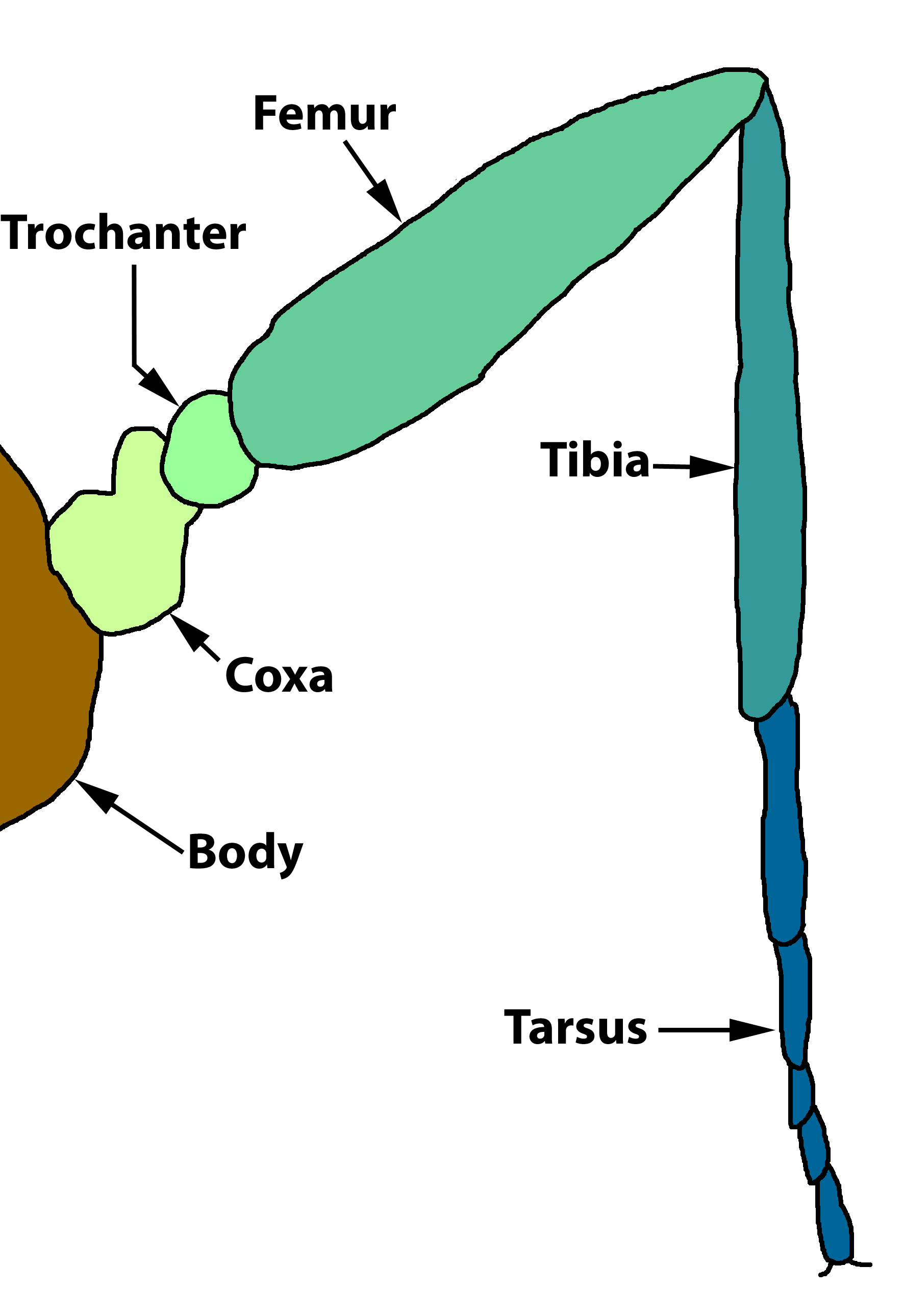
Insect leg

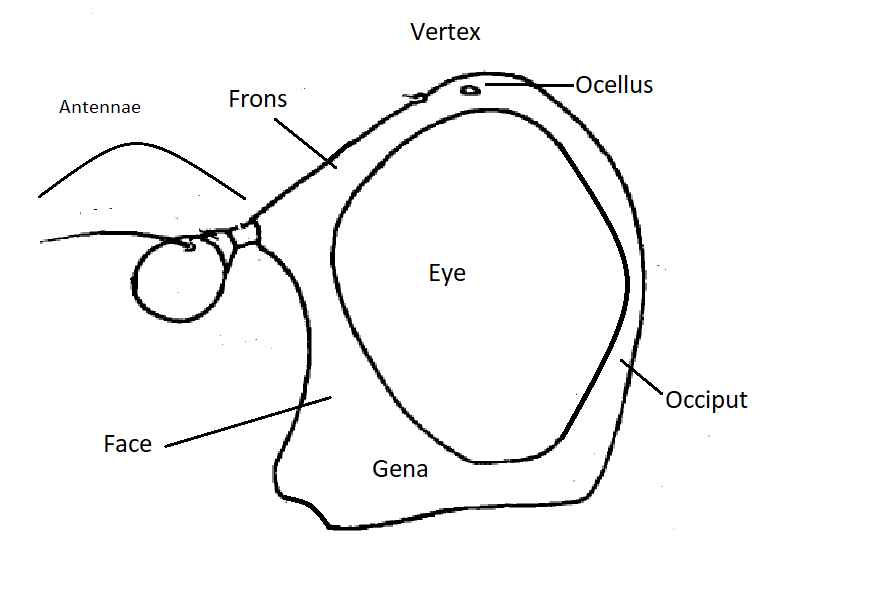
profile syrphid head

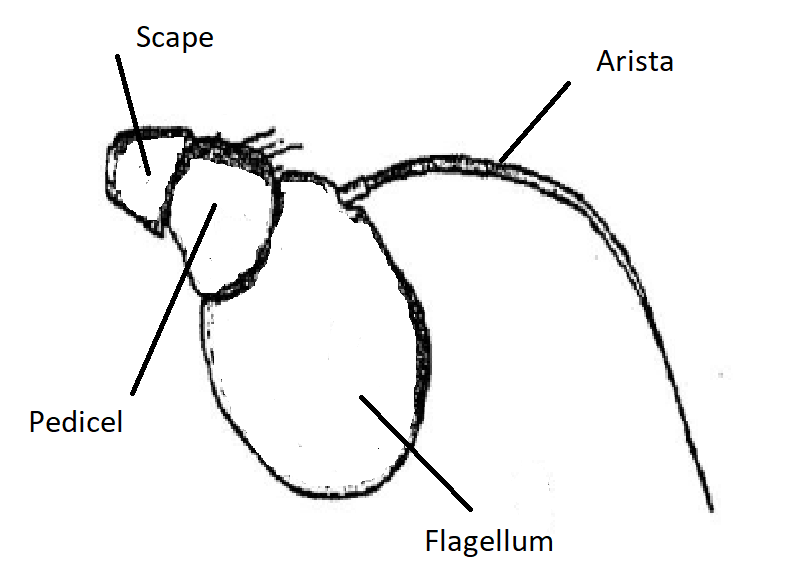
Antenna syrphid

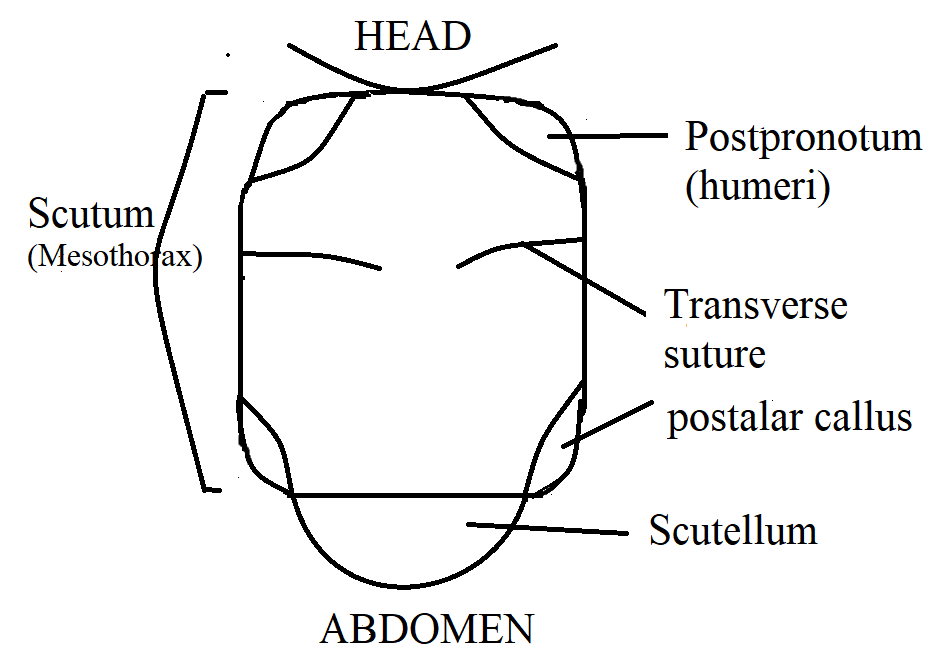
dorsal view of Syrphid thorax

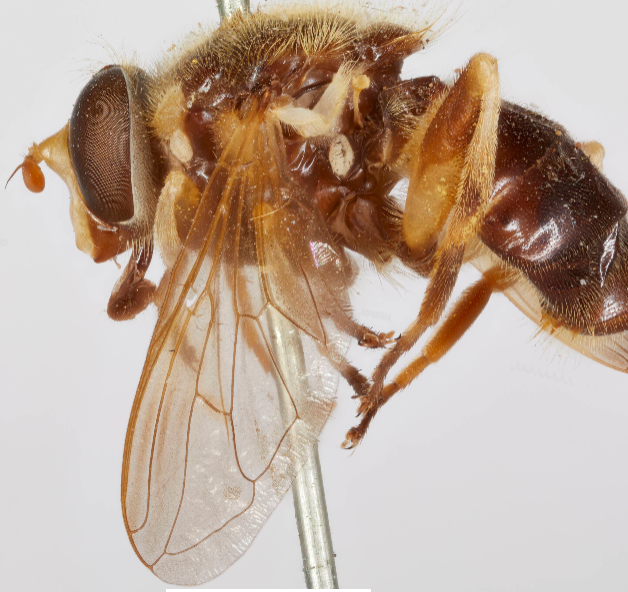
Blera humeralis side view
