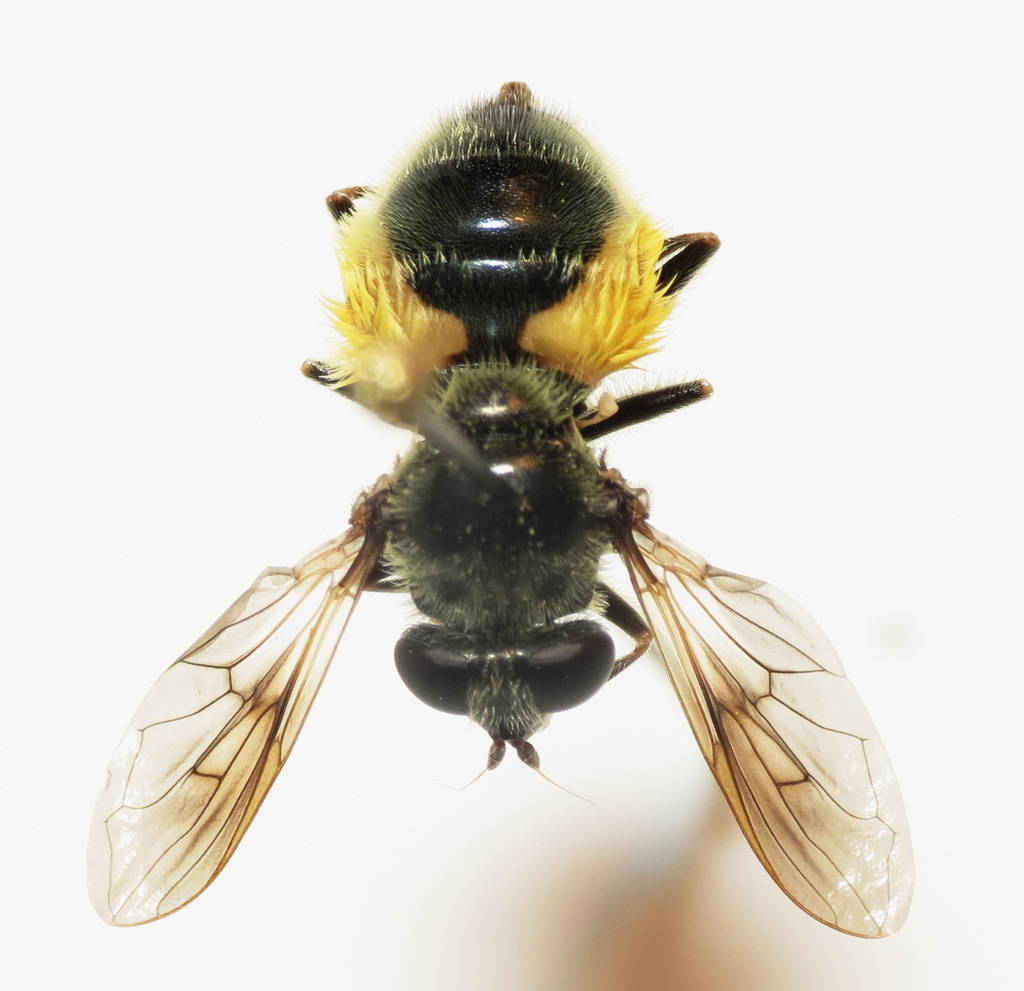

Scientific classification
- Kingdom: Animalia
- Phylum: Arthropoda
- Class: Insecta
- Order: Diptera
- Family: Syrphidae
- Subfamily: Eristalinae
- Tribe: Milesiini
- Genus: Blera
- Species: B. umbratilis

Binomial name
- Blera umbratilis (Williston, 1882)

Synonyms
- Criorhina umbratilis Williston, 1882

= Blera umbratilis =

Species of fly

Blera umbratilis, the hairy wood fly, is an uncommon species of syrphid fly first officially described by Williston in 1887. Hoverflies get their names from the ability to remain nearly motionless while in flight. The adults are also known as flower flies for they are commonly found around and on flowers, from which they get both energy-giving nectar and protein-rich pollen. The larvae are of the rat-tailed type, feeding on exuding sap or in the rot holes of trees.

== Distribution ==
This is a Nearctic species of the eastern and central areas of the United States. External map

== Description ==
For terms see Morphology of Diptera. External images

Size
10mm.

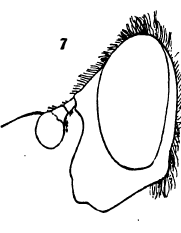

Head

The front is broader above than in the preceding species, mostly shining, with rather long yellowish pile; The face is black, thickly dusted with white on the sides, and with a bare black median stripe vitta and the cheeks shining. The face is considerably excavated below, produced downward and somewhat forwards. The antennae reddish-brown, and the flagellum is orbicular. The frontal prominence is relatively small, The occiput is black, with yellowish pile and gray pollen.

Thorax

The dorsum of the thorax, scutum and Blera postpronotum are, shining black, with rather abundant, obscurely yellow pile. The pile is black across the middle. The scutellum and pleura are black with yellow pile.

Abdomen

The abdomen is short, oval; black, shining, with short black pile. The sides of the second segment are broadly orange yellow. The third segment is less broadly orange-yellow and the fourth segment is narrowly orange-yellow. The black ground color is, however, almost wholly obscured by thick woolly orange yellow pile, extending less broadly on the sides of the third segment, and narrowly on the margin of the fourth. The pile of the second segment in the middle is short yellow.

Wing

The wings are somewhat brownish, a little lighter at the base. There is a darker cloud near the fork of the second (R_{2+3}) and third veins (R_{4+5}). The vein R_{4+5} is almost straight and joins the costa just before the tip of the wing. The first posterior cell R_{4+5} is acute apically and extends almost to the wing margin before the tip.

Legs

The legs are black, with yellowish white pile. The base of middle femora and basal two-thirds of hind femora are yellow. The basal end of front and middle tibiae and all the tarsi, except the last two joints and hind metatarsi are yellow.

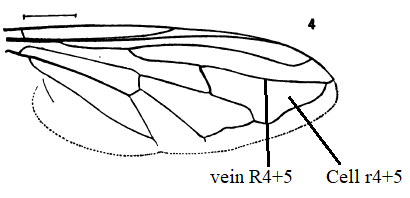
Blera wing veins

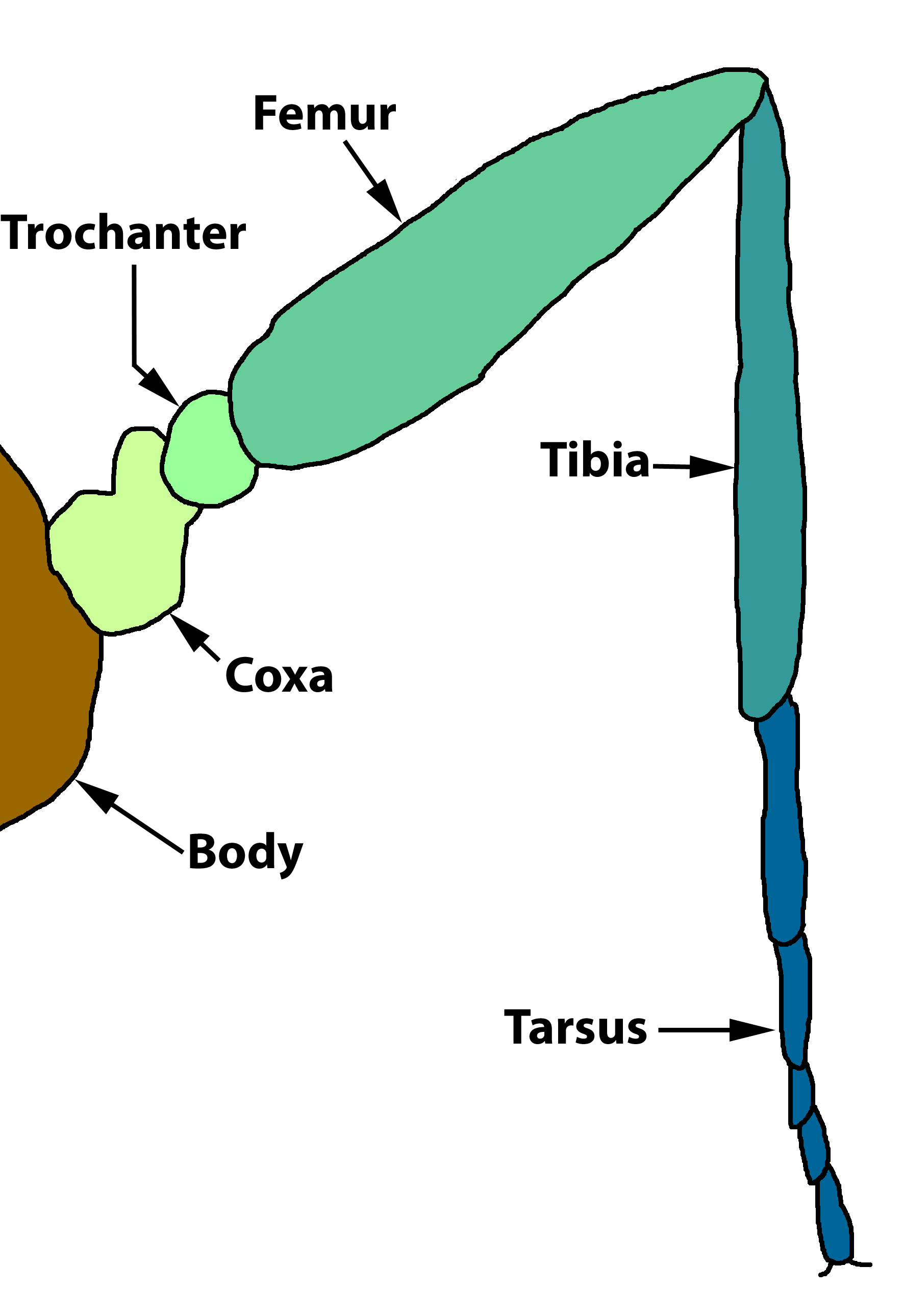
Insect leg

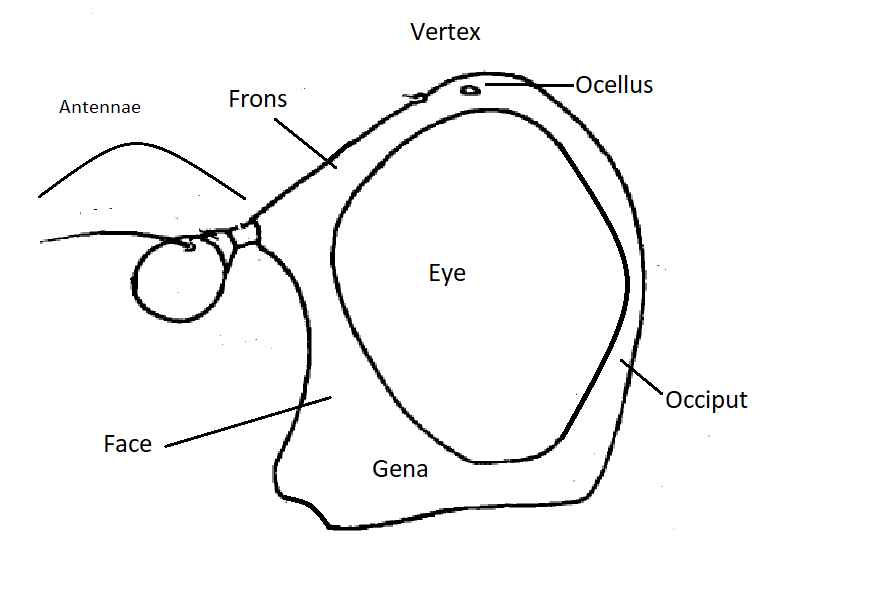
profile syrphid head

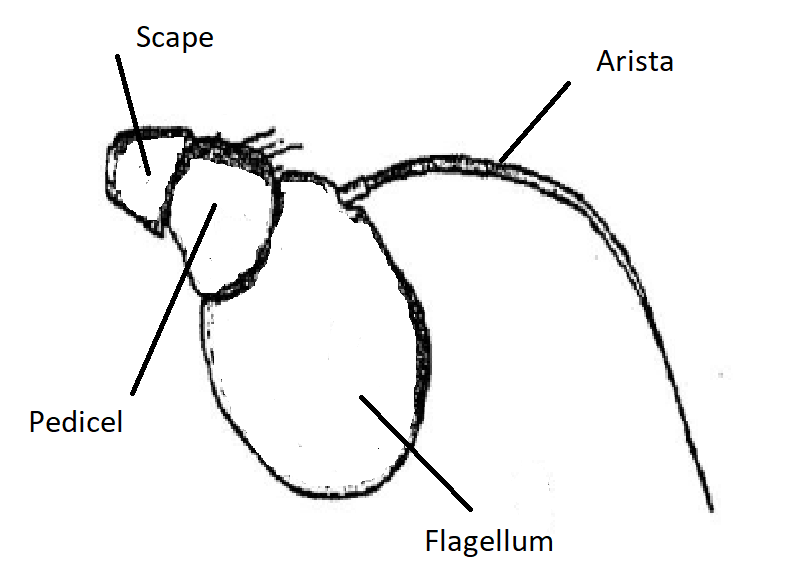
Antenna syrphid

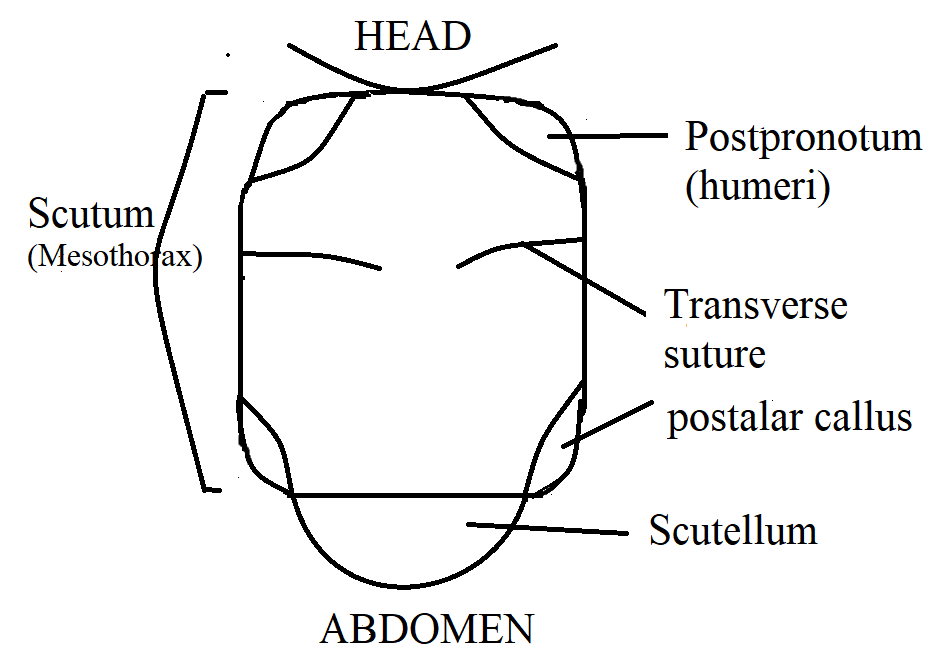
dorsal view of Syrphid thorax

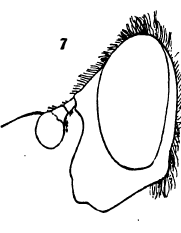
Blera umbratilis
