= Blera notata =

Scientific classification
- Kingdom: Animalia
- Phylum: Arthropoda
- Class: Insecta
- Order: Diptera
- Family: Syrphidae
- Subfamily: Eristalinae
- Tribe: Milesiini
- Genus: Blera
- Species: B. notata

Binomial name
- Blera notata (Wiedemann, 1830)

Synonyms
- Milesia notata Wiedemann, 1830; Spilomyia pallipes Bigot, 1884; Syrphus profusus Walker, 1849

Species of fly

Blera notata , the ornate wood fly, is a rare species of syrphid fly first officially described by Weidemann in 1830. Hoverflies get their names from the ability to remain nearly motionless while in flight. The adults, also known as flower flies for they are commonly found around and on flowers from which they get both energy-giving nectar and protein rich pollen. The larvae are of the rat-tailed type, feeding on exuding sap or in the rot holes of trees.

== Distribution ==
United States.
