= Blera johnsoni =

Scientific classification
- Kingdom: Animalia
- Phylum: Arthropoda
- Class: Insecta
- Order: Diptera
- Family: Syrphidae
- Subfamily: Eristalinae
- Tribe: Milesiini
- Genus: Blera
- Species: B. johnsoni

Binomial name
- Blera johnsoni (Coquillett, 1894)

Synonyms
- Cynorhina johnsoni Coquillett, 1894

Species of fly

Blera johnsoni is a species of hoverfly in the family Syrphidae.

== Distribution ==
United States.
