= Blera flukei =

Scientific classification
- Kingdom: Animalia
- Phylum: Arthropoda
- Class: Insecta
- Order: Diptera
- Family: Syrphidae
- Subfamily: Eristalinae
- Tribe: Milesiini
- Genus: Blera
- Species: B. flukei

Binomial name
- Blera flukei (Curran, 1953)

Synonyms
- Cynorhina flukei Curran, 1953

Species of fly

Blera flukei, the red-cheeked wood fly, is a rare species of syrphid fly first officially described by Curran, 1953 as Cynorhina flukei. Hoverflies get their names from the ability to remain nearly motionless while in flight. The adults are also known as flower flies for they are commonly found around and on flowers, from which they get both energy-giving nectar and protein-rich pollen. The larvae are of the rat-tailed type, feeding on exuding sap or in the rot holes of trees.

== Distribution ==
This is a nearctic species that is distributed across the Northern United States and Southern Canada from Alaska to Oregon and into Idaho. External map

== Description ==
For terms see Morphology of Diptera. External images of Blera flukei

Size 11 to 13 mm
Head

The face is elongate conical anteroventrally. The facial orbits are a pale yellow pollinose, with short, fine black and yellow hair. The gena have a trace of small brown spot close to the oral margin. The vertical triangle is shining black and with long black hair. The ocellar triangle and upper three fourths of the occiput are black. The frontal orbits are pale yellow pollinose. The antennifers are very pronounced making face in profile deeply excavated behind the antennae. The antennae are orange with pale brown arista. The occiput is gray pollinose and with brassy yellow hair except the upper orbital cilia which are black.

Thorax

The scutum is shining blue-black, with black pile usually with a narrow band (fascia) of yellowish pile in the front and sometimes with scattered yellowish or tawny hair on the disc and with a patch of gray pollen inside the humeri. The pile of the female scutum is wholly brassy yellow.

Abdomen

The abdomen is shining blue-black, mostly clothed with black pile. The sides of the second tergite bear a large triangle of brassy yellow pile, and there is a very small patch on the anterior angles of the fourth tergite. The external genitalia may be partly or wholly pale pilose.

Wing

The wings are ashy gray and hyaline. The anterior veins are reddish yellow. The base of the wings are pale orange. The vein R_{4+5} is almost straight and joins the costa just before the tip of the wing. The first posterior cell (r_{4+5}) is acute apically and extends almost to the wing margin before the tip.

Legs

The legs are black and yellow. The femurs are black with black pile and are reddish yellow near the distal joints. The tibia is yellow with black bands covering to as little as their median third. The tarsi are yellow except the distal two tarsomeres that are black.

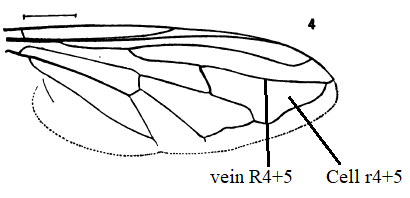
Blera wing veins

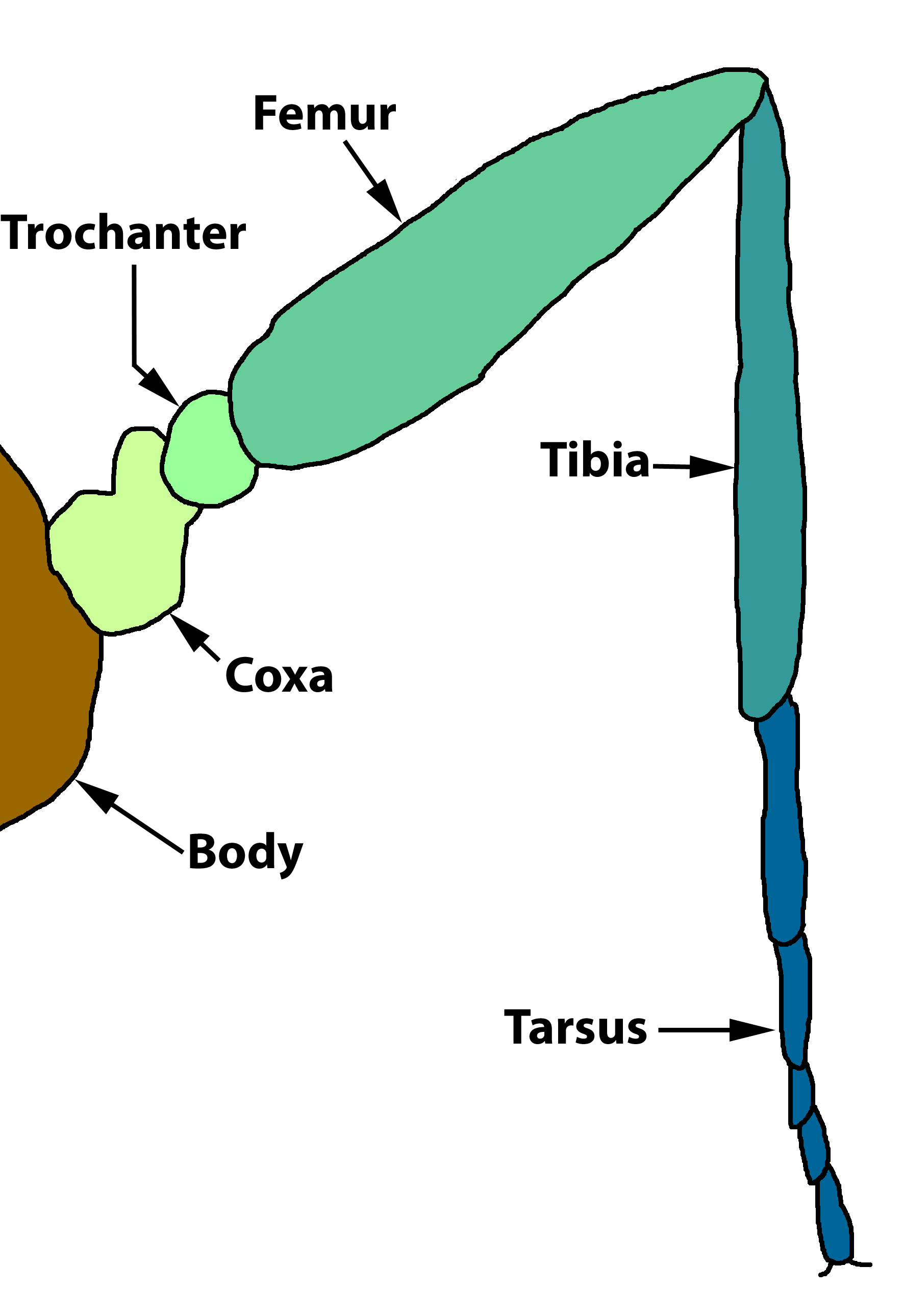
Insect leg

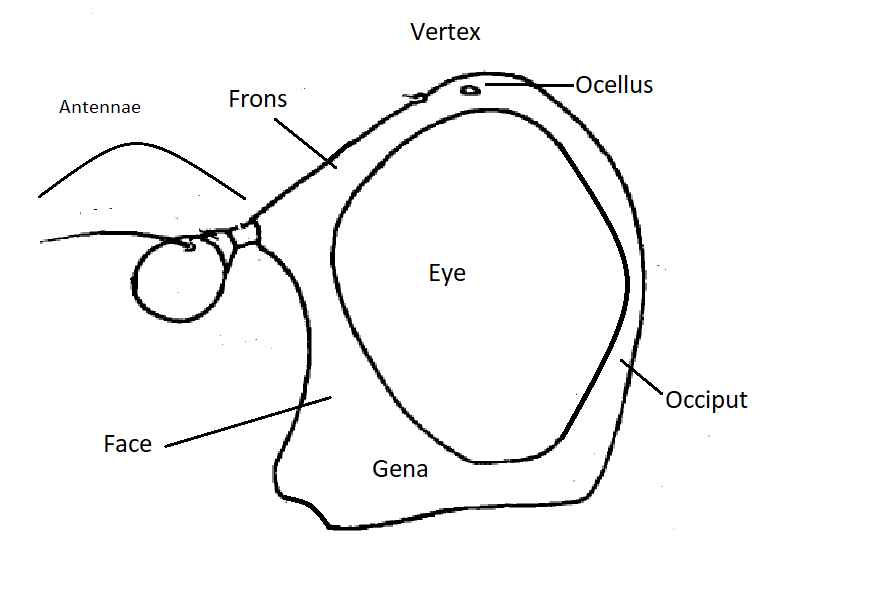
profile syrphid head

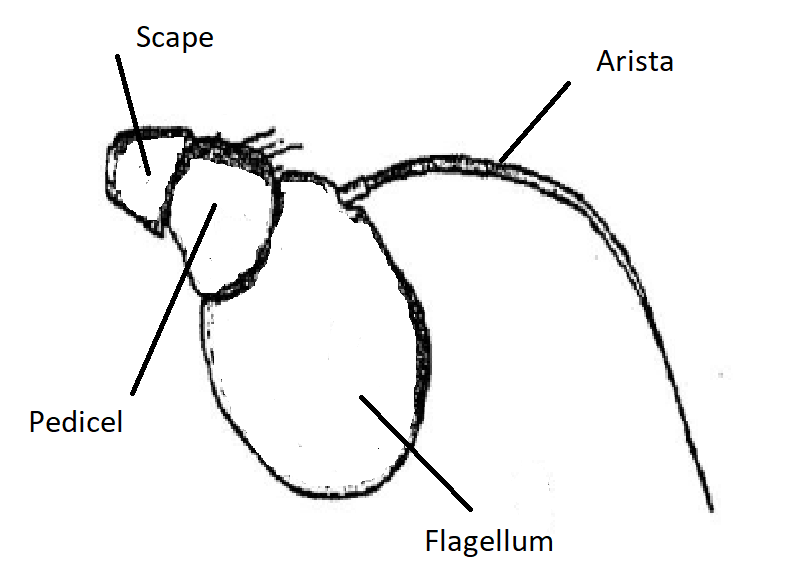
Antenna syrphid

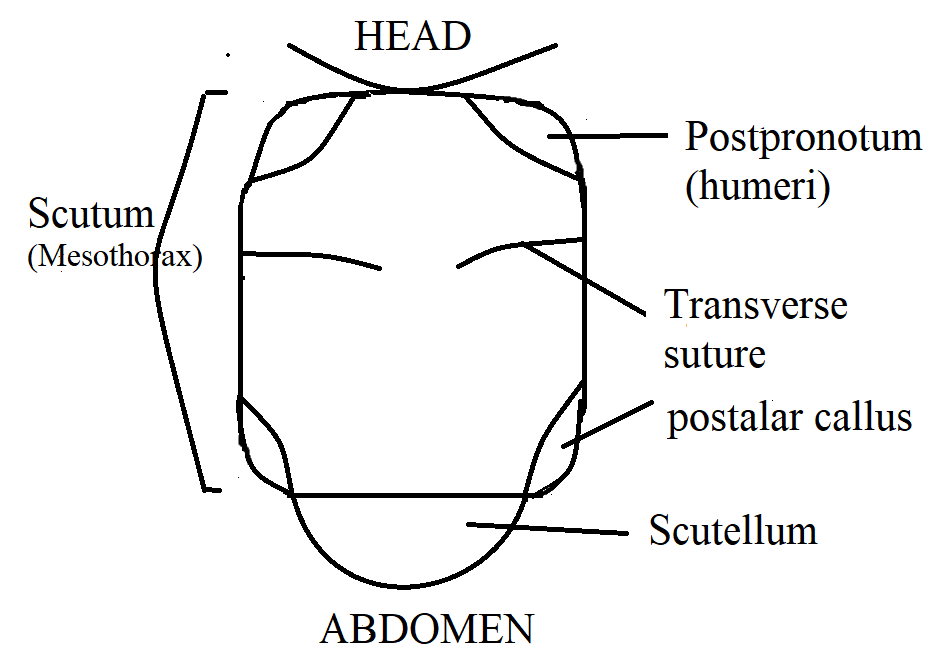
dorsal view of Syrphid thorax
