= Blera garretti =

Scientific classification
- Kingdom: Animalia
- Phylum: Arthropoda
- Class: Insecta
- Order: Diptera
- Family: Syrphidae
- Subfamily: Eristalinae
- Tribe: Milesiini
- Genus: Blera
- Species: B. garretti

Binomial name
- Blera garretti (Curran, 1924)

Synonyms
- Cynorhina garretti Curran, 1924

Species of fly

Blera garretti is a species of hoverfly in the family Syrphidae.

== Distribution ==
Canada, United States.
