= Blera metcalfi =

Scientific classification
- Kingdom: Animalia
- Phylum: Arthropoda
- Class: Insecta
- Order: Diptera
- Family: Syrphidae
- Subfamily: Eristalinae
- Tribe: Milesiini
- Genus: Blera
- Species: B. metcalfi

Binomial name
- Blera metcalfi (Curran, 1925)

Synonyms
- Cynorhina metcalfi Curran, 1925

Species of fly

Blera metcalfi, Metcalf's wood fly, is a rare species of syrphid fly first officially described by Curran in 1925 Hoverflies get their name from the ability to remain nearly motionless while in flight. The adults are also known as flower flies for they are commonly found around and on flowers from which they get both energy-giving nectar and protein rich pollen. The larvae are of the rat-tailed type feeding on exuding sap or in the rot holes of trees.

== Distribution ==
This is a Nearctic species with a single report from the Eastern United States. External map

== Description ==
For terms see Morphology of Diptera.

Length 11.5 to 12 mm.

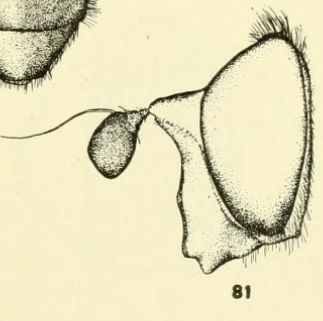
Blera metcalfi

Head

The frons is pale waxy yellow with a median black stripe (vitta). In the middle of the black stripe is a long longitudinal depression. The frons is densely covered with yellowish white pollen. The frontal triangle is without pile. The vertical triangle is long and moderately acute, black, with yellow pile. The Face is also pale waxy yellow and has median stripe just on the lower two-thirds. The face is covered with very a fine, almost white pile on the side margins, elsewhere densely covered with yellowish pollen. The gena are shining black or piceous. In profile the face appears slightly receding, with a moderate, long swelling below the middle. The antennae are black, the flagellum is more brown. The arista is luteous with the apical fourth black. The eyes are contiguous Holoptic in the male, more strongly so before the vertical triangle The frontal prominence has white pile on the side margins and the lower sides of the prominence. The occiput is yellowish grey pollinose, with yellowish white pile which becomes more yellowish above.

Thorax

The scutum is piceous. The dorsum cupreous black and the humeri yellowish. The scutellum is brownish black, shining, its apex yellowish. The pile is pale yellowish and longer on the pleurae.

Abdomen

The abdomen with two pairs of spots in the male.

The abdomen is piceous blackish with the basal portions of the third and fourth segments and the basal portion of the second more blackish. The second segment has a pair of yellow spots, their outer ends occupying a little more than half the segment and joining the broad lateral margins of the first segment. Their hind margins are sinuate, the spots narrowed somewhat inside their outer ends by a concavity, and their inner ends narrow and obtusely rounded, directed just a little caudad. The third segment with a pair of small, triangular basal spots. Broad triangular apices of the second and third segments and the small triangular apex of the fourth, black pilose, elsewhere with yellowish pile. The venter is yellowish.

Wing

The wings are subhyaline with a yellowish stigma.stigma Squamae Calypter white, with pallid yellow border and fringe. Halteres pale yellow. The vein R_{4+5} is almost straight and joins the costa just before the tip of the wing. The first posterior cell R4+5 is acute apically and extends almost to the wing margin before the tip.

Legs

The legs shining brownish. The basal third of the hind femora with the apices of all the femora, the base of the hind tibiae and the first three segments of the anterior four tarsi, all yellow in color. The hind femora are yellow on the basal fourth. The third tarsal segment is sometimes darker. The anterior four tibiae are yellow, with obscure darker bands, very broad and brownish on the front ones, where they occupy about half the subapical area, narrower near the middle of the median tibiae.

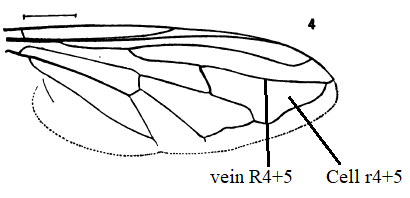
Blera wing veins

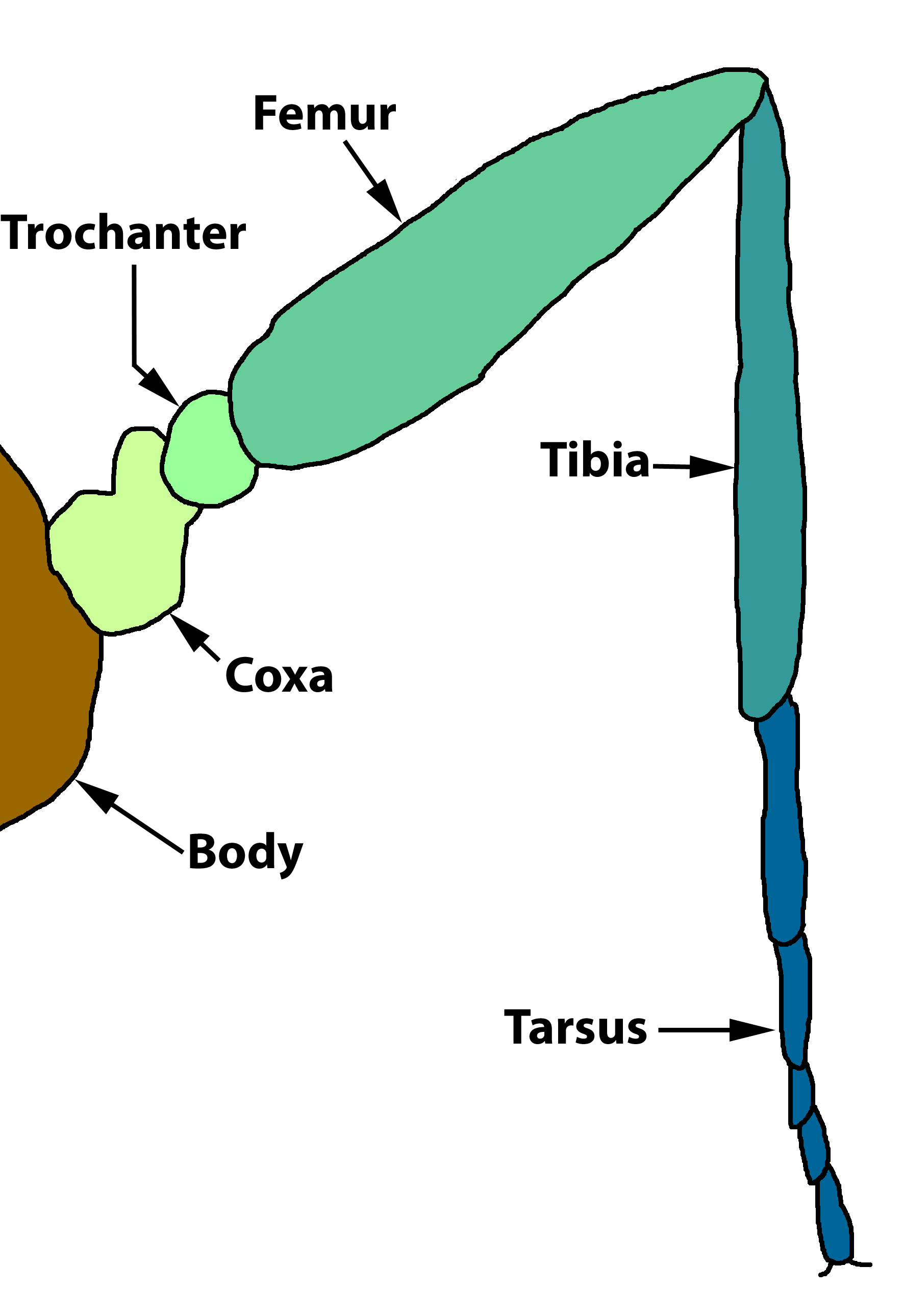
Insect leg

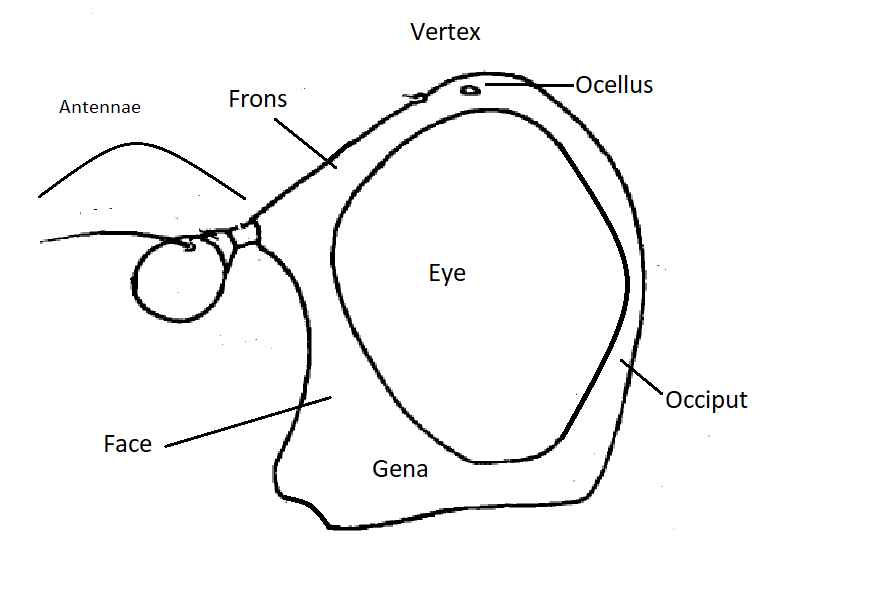
profile syrphid head

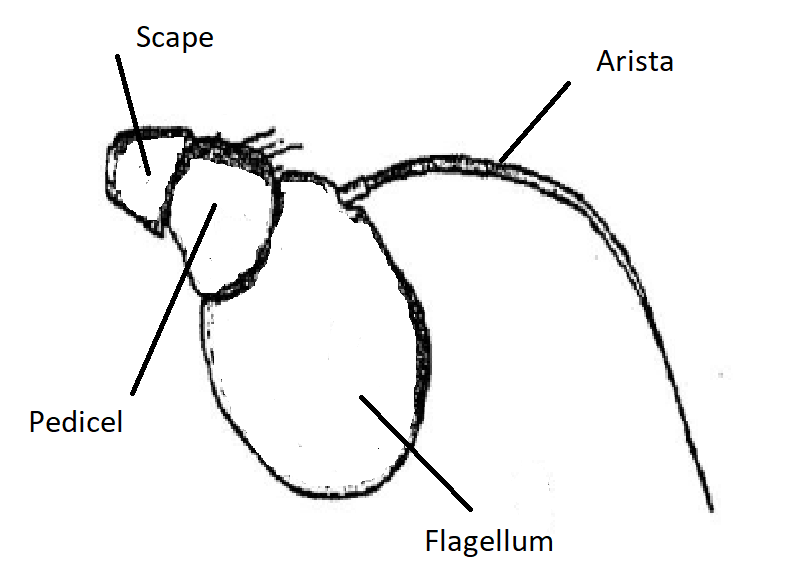
Antenna syrphid

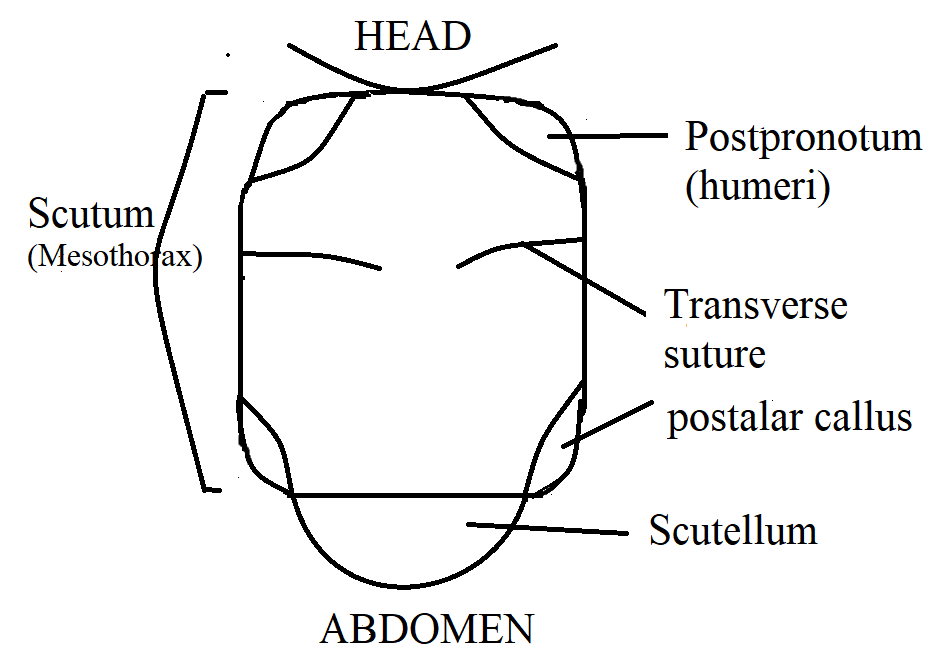
dorsal view of Syrphid thorax
