= Blera chillcotti =

Scientific classification
- Kingdom: Animalia
- Phylum: Arthropoda
- Class: Insecta
- Order: Diptera
- Family: Syrphidae
- Subfamily: Eristalinae
- Tribe: Milesiini
- Genus: Blera
- Species: B. chillcotti

Binomial name
- Blera chillcotti Thompson, 2012

Species of fly

Blera chillcotti is a species of hoverfly in the family Syrphidae.

== Distribution ==
Nepal.
