= Blera ferdinandi =

Scientific classification
- Kingdom: Animalia
- Phylum: Arthropoda
- Class: Insecta
- Order: Diptera
- Family: Syrphidae
- Subfamily: Eristalinae
- Tribe: Milesiini
- Genus: Blera
- Species: B. ferdinandi

Binomial name
- Blera ferdinandi (Hervé-Bazin, 1914)

Synonyms
- Cynorrhina ferdinandi Hervé-Bazin, 1914

Species of fly

Blera ferdinandi is a species of hoverfly in the family Syrphidae.

== Distribution ==
Japan.
