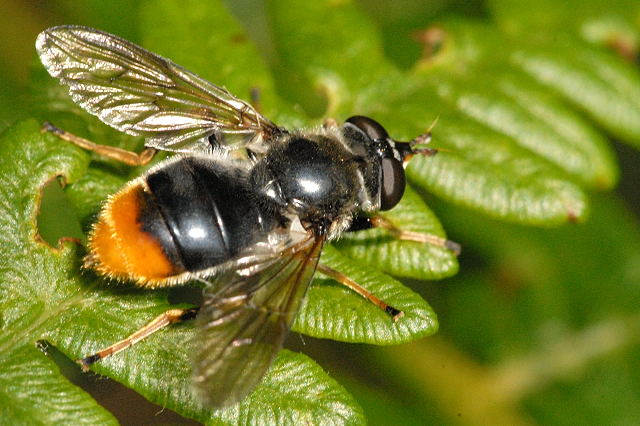
- Blera fallax female

Scientific classification
- Kingdom: Animalia
- Phylum: Arthropoda
- Clade: Pancrustacea
- Class: Insecta
- Order: Diptera
- Family: Syrphidae
- Subfamily: Eristalinae
- Tribe: Milesiini
- Genus: Blera; Billberg, 1820

Type species
- Musca fallax Linnaeus, 1758

Synonyms
- Cynorhina Williston, 1887; Cynorrhina Verrall, 1901; Penthesilea Meigen, 1800

= Blera (fly) =

Genus of flies

Blera is primarily a North American genus, though there are 3 species from Europe. The genus is characterized by the following characters:

- face with distinct central knob, less developed in females; frons distinctly produced
- antennae shorter than head width, arista dorsal
- body covered long sometimes dense hairs
- legs simple bare and undeveloped metasternite
- short apical section of vein R 4+5

The larvae are found in decaying heartwood in roots of trees and stumps.

There are keys to American and British species. external map

== Species ==
- Blera ambigua (Shiraki, 1968)
- Blera analis (Macquart, 1842)
- Blera armillata (Osten Sacken, 1875)
- Blera badia (Walker, 1849)
- Blera chillcotti Thompson, 2012
- Blera confusa Johnson, 1913
- Blera eoa (Stackelberg, 1928)
- Blera equimacula Huo, Ren & Zheng, 2007
- Blera fallax (Linnaeus, 1758)
- Blera ferdinandi (Hervé-Bazin, 1914)
- Blera flukei (Curran, 1953)
- Blera garretti (Curran, 1924)
- Blera himalaya Thompson, 2000
- Blera humeralis (Williston, 1882)
- Blera japonica (Shiraki, 1930)
- Blera johnsoni (Coquillett, 1894)
- Blera kyotoensis (Shiraki, 1952)
- Blera lonigseta Barkalov & Cheng, 2011
- Blera metcalfi (Curran, 1925)
- Blera nigra (Williston, 1887)
- Blera nigrescens Shiraki, 1968
- Blera nigripes (Curran, 1925)
- Blera nitens (Stackelberg, 1923)
- Blera notata (Wiedemann, 1830)
- Blera ochrozona (Stackelberg, 1928)
- Blera pictipes (Bigot, 1884)
- Blera robusta (Curran, 1922)
- Blera scitula (Williston, 1887)
- Blera shirakii Barkalov & Mutin, 1991
- Blera umbratilis (Williston, 1887)
- Blera violovitshi Mutin, 1991
- Blera yudini Barkalov, 1991
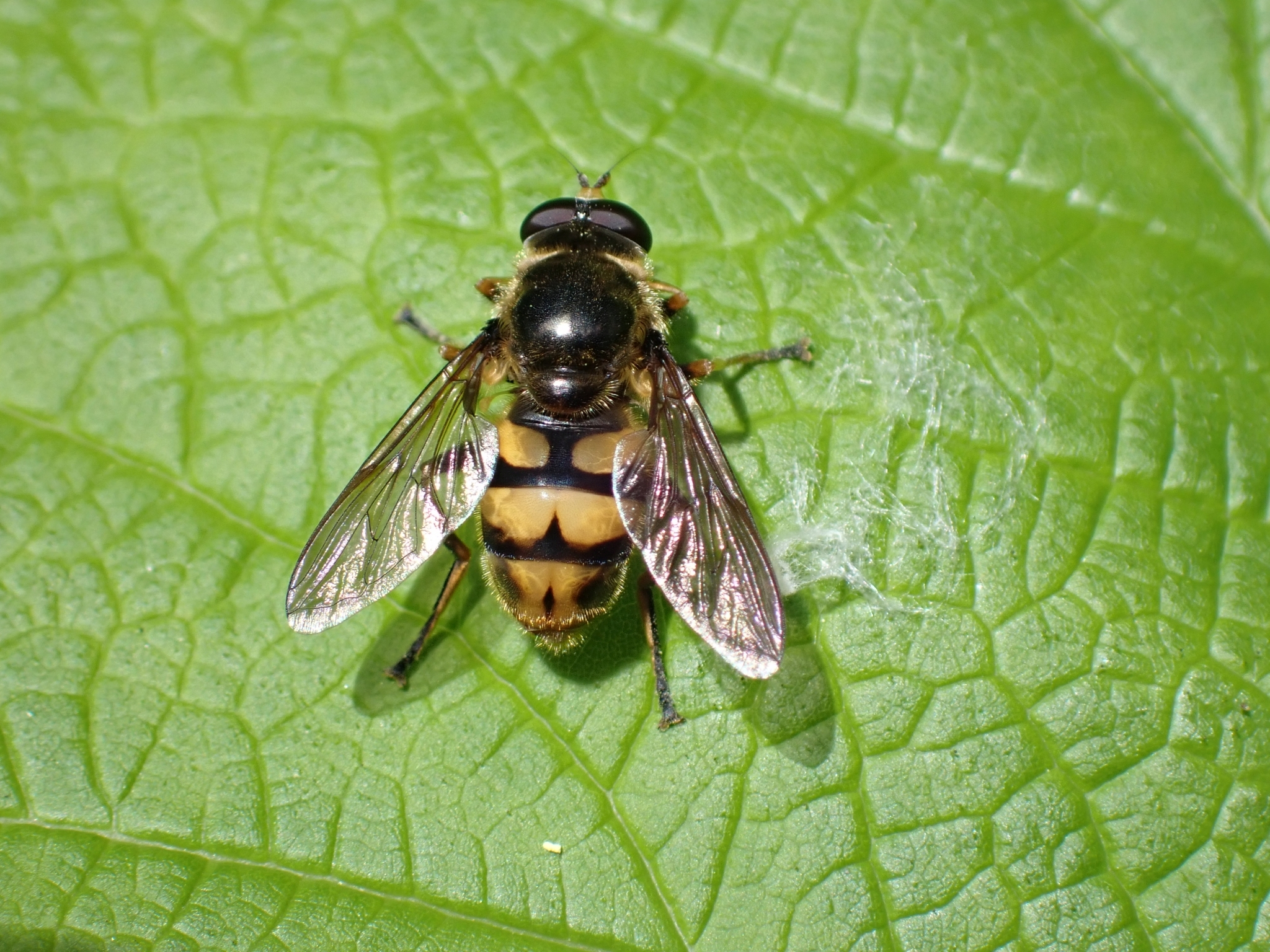
Western Wood Fly
Blera scitula

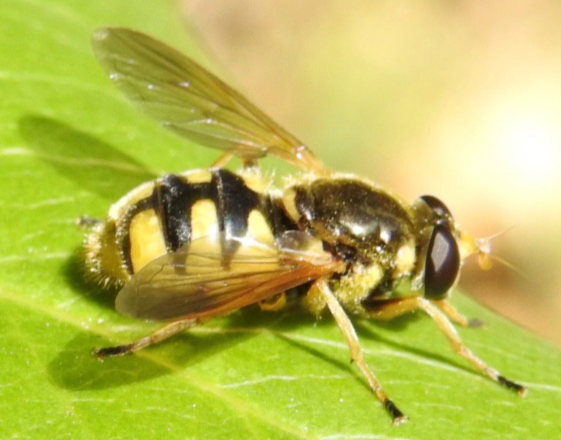
Yellow-legged Wood Fly
Blera humeralis

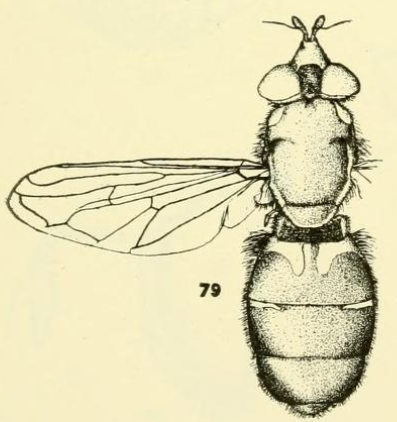
The Painted Wood Fly
Blera pictipes

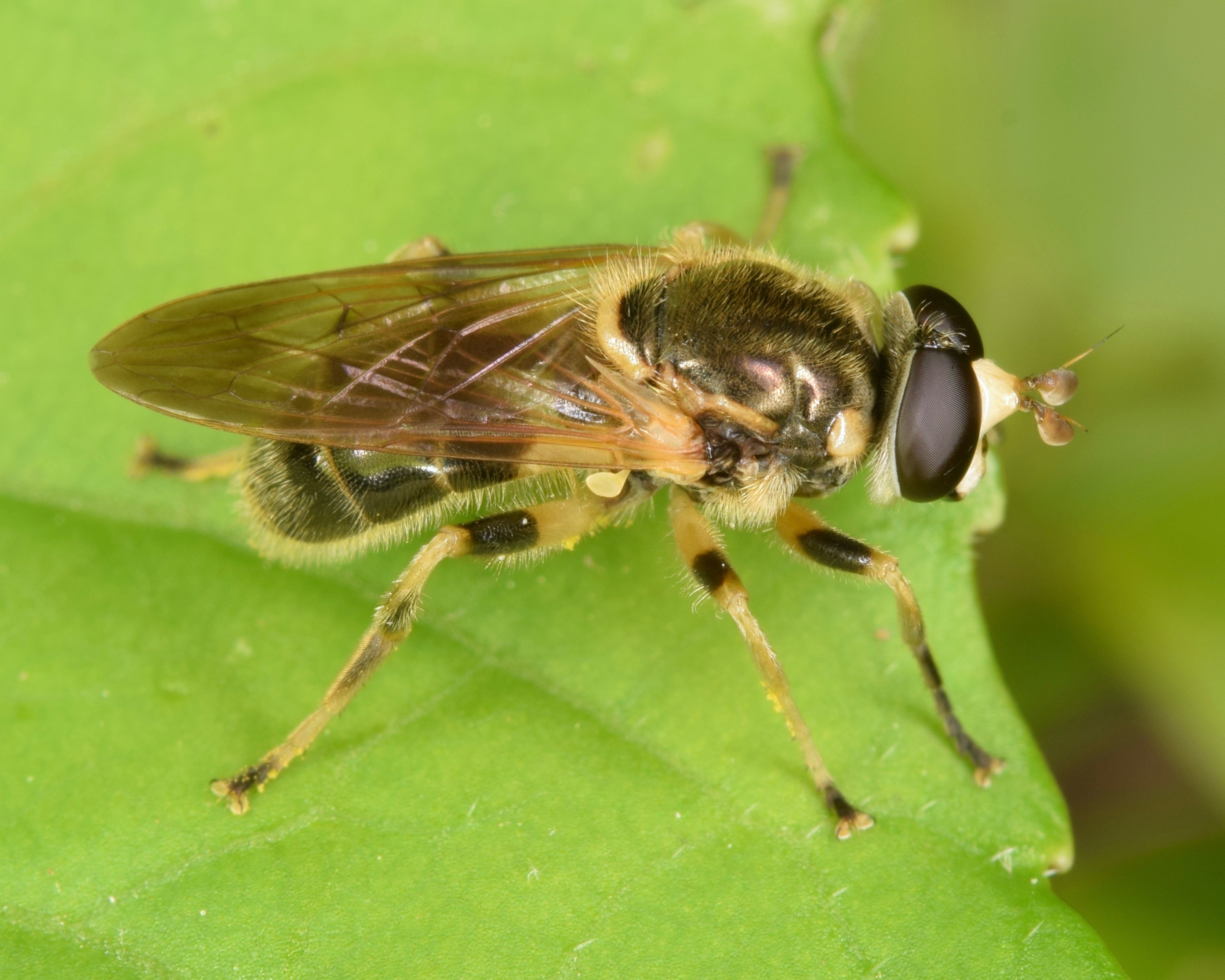
Painted Wood Fly
Blera pictipes
