= Blera nigrescens =

Scientific classification
- Kingdom: Animalia
- Phylum: Arthropoda
- Class: Insecta
- Order: Diptera
- Family: Syrphidae
- Subfamily: Eristalinae
- Tribe: Milesiini
- Genus: Blera
- Species: B. nigrescens

Binomial name
- Blera nigrescens Shiraki, 1968

Species of fly

Blera nigrescens is a species of hoverfly in the family Syrphidae.

== Distribution ==
Japan.
