= Blera yudini =

Scientific classification
- Kingdom: Animalia
- Phylum: Arthropoda
- Class: Insecta
- Order: Diptera
- Family: Syrphidae
- Subfamily: Eristalinae
- Tribe: Milesiini
- Genus: Blera
- Species: B. yudini

Binomial name
- Blera yudini Barkalov, 1991

Species of fly

Blera yudini is a species of hoverfly in the family Syrphidae.

== Distribution ==
Russia.
