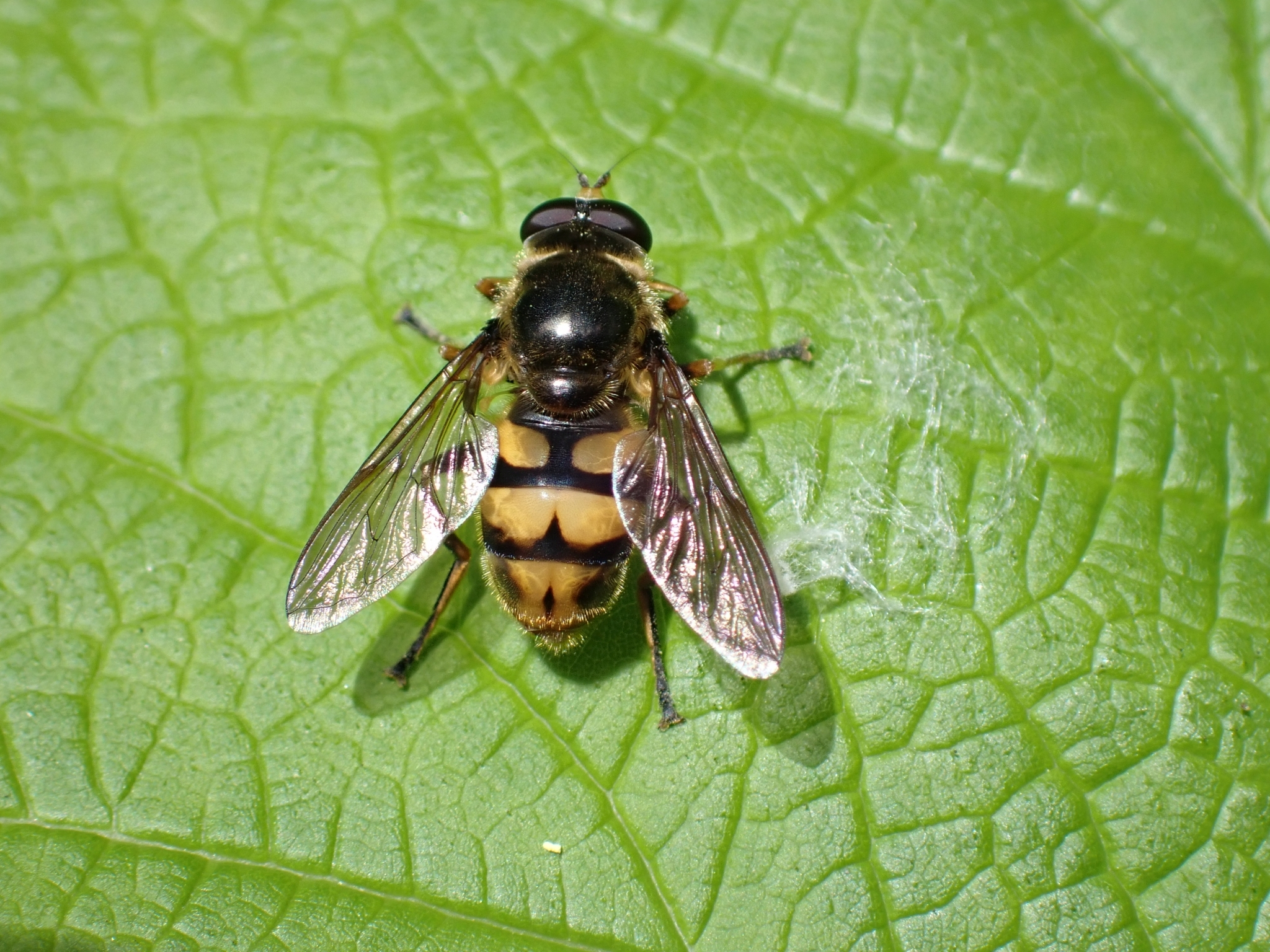

Scientific classification
- Kingdom: Animalia
- Phylum: Arthropoda
- Class: Insecta
- Order: Diptera
- Family: Syrphidae
- Subfamily: Eristalinae
- Tribe: Milesiini
- Genus: Blera
- Species: B. scitula

Binomial name
- Blera scitula (Williston, 1882)

Synonyms
- Criorhina scitula Williston, 1882

= Blera scitula =

Species of fly

Blera scitula, the western wood fly, is an uncommon species of syrphid fly first officially described by Williston in 1882. Hoverflies get their names from the ability to remain nearly motionless while in flight. The adults are also known as flower flies, for they are commonly found around and on the flowers from which they get both energy-giving nectar and protein-rich pollen. The larvae of Blera are of the rat-tailed type, feeding on exuding sap or in the rot holes of trees.

== Distribution ==
This is a Nearctic species found on the western coastal area of North America. External image

== Description ==
For terms see Morphology of Diptera. External images

Size 10 to 13 mm.
Head

The frontal triangle is opaque yellow, The vertical triangle is black, with black pile. In the female the frons is moderately narrowed above and yellow on the lower fourth, shining greenish black elsewhere except thinly reddish pollinose in front of the ocelli. The pile is black. The pile is longer on the ocellar triangle and is yellow at the vertex. The face is yellow, with yellow pollen and a prominent rounded tubercle in the middle. The gena are shining black. The antennae are red with the flagellum obscurely brownish above. The arista is brown. The frontal prominence is yellow with side margins and the lower sides with sparse, short yellowish pile. The eyes are contiguous Holoptic in the male. The occiput is greyish yellow pollinose, with bright yellow pile.

Thorax

The dorsum of thorax (scutum) is aeneous with pile bright yellow before the transverse suture, on the narrow lateral margins and immediately in front of the scutellum. The humeri (postpronotum) and border of the scutum are yellow. The area on the disc behind the suture is black. In the female there is a patch of black pile before the ends of the thoracic suture and the scutellum is aeneous with long, bright yellow pile, but there are some black hairs on the disc.

Abdomen

The abdomen is black with bold yellow spots. The second segment has a pair of large yellow spots, rounded interiorly and directed forward laterally so that they touch the anterior margin towards the sides. The third segment has a broad, complete basal yellow band (fascia) occupying at least half, sometimes four-fifths the length of the segment on each side of the median notch, considerably or moderately narrowed towards the sides, never going over the side margins in more than half the length of the segment, sometimes only narrowly at the anterior angles. The fourth segment is variable, sometimes all black, but most frequently with a triangular spot on the anterior angles and a pair of narrowly separated triangular spots in the middle at the base reddish yellow. Sometimes all of these markings may be more or less fused with the central black stripe (vitta) usually distinct. The fifth abdominal segment is yellowish basally, more broadly so in the middle. The pile slightly shorter throughout. In the female the abdominal bands are narrower, the second and third segments are usually narrowly interrupted in the middle, fifth segment is yellowish basally, more broadly so in the middle and the pile is slightly shorter throughout. The hypopygium usually reddish.

Genitalia

The genitalia were described by Metcalf in 1921

Wings

The wings are cinereous hyaline, somewhat yellowish on the basal portion anteriorly. The squamae Calypter are white, with a yellow border and fringe. The halteres (#9) are yellow. The vein R_{4+5} is almost straight and joins the costa just before the tip of the wing. The first posterior cell r_{4+5} is acute apically and extends almost to the wing margin before the tip.

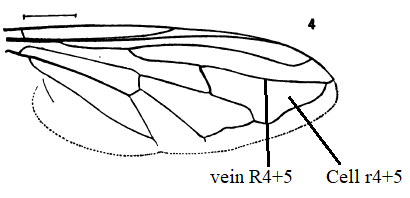
Blera wing veins

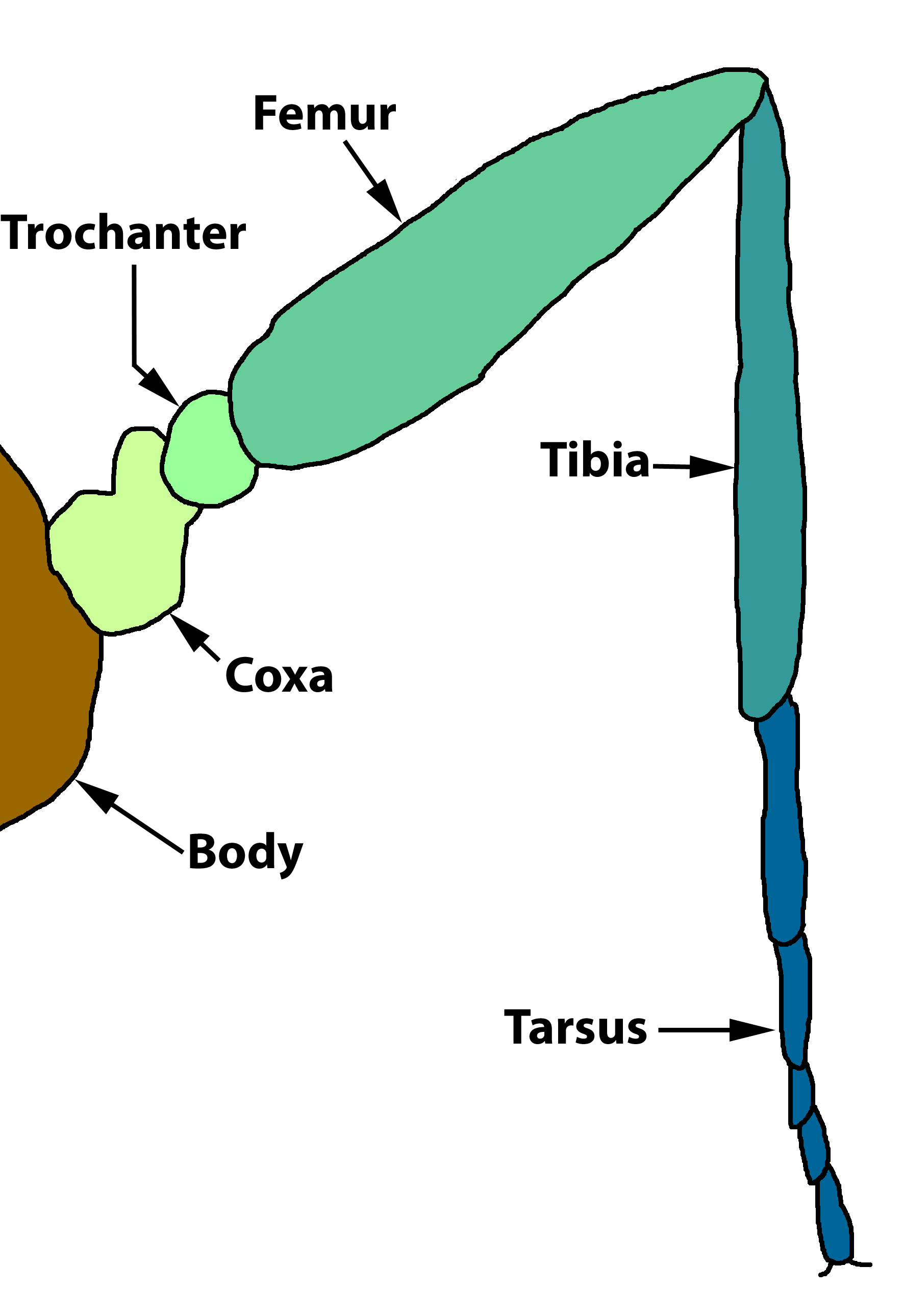
Insect leg

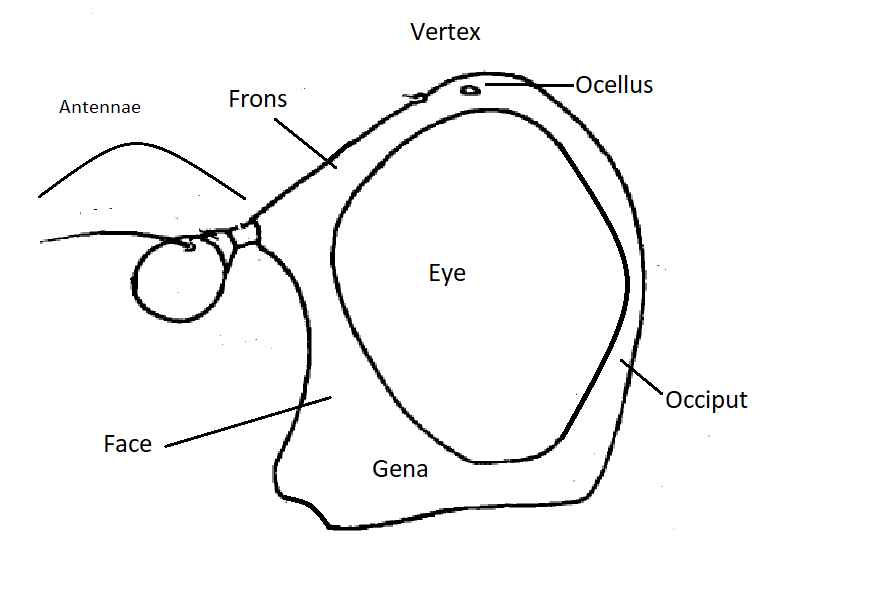
profile syrphid head

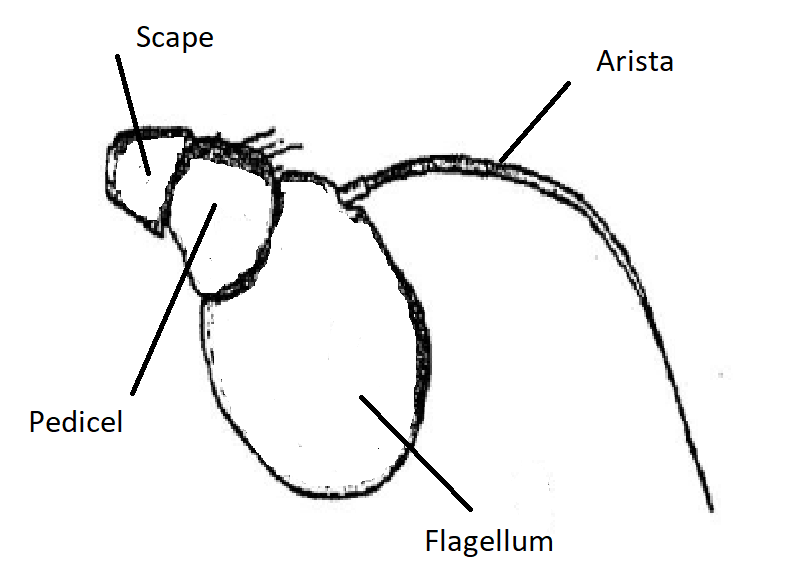
Antenna syrphid

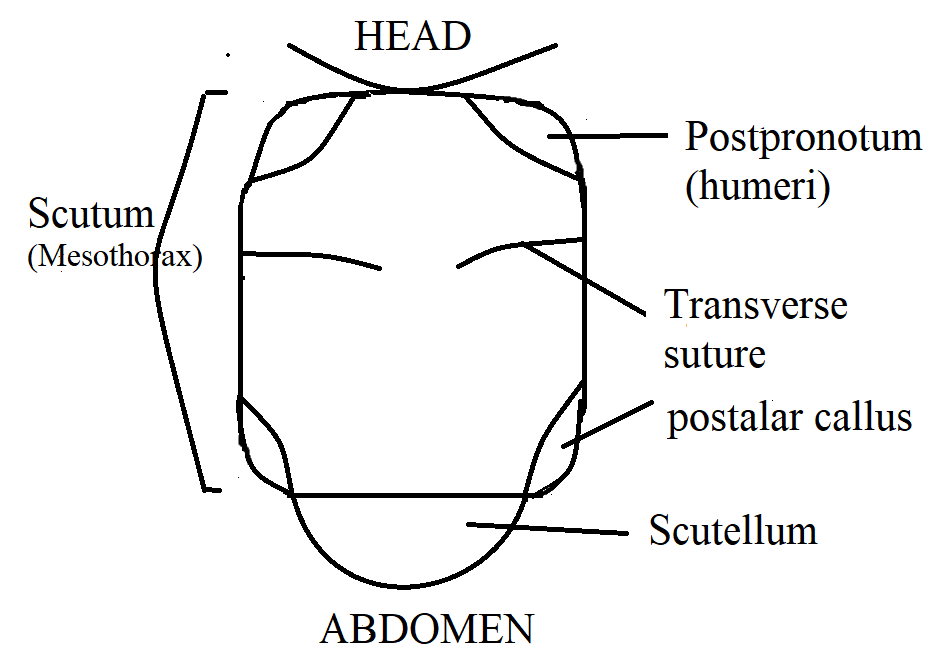
dorsal view of Syrphid thorax

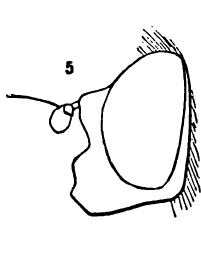
Blera scitula head profile
