= Blera armillata =

Scientific classification
- Kingdom: Animalia
- Phylum: Arthropoda
- Class: Insecta
- Order: Diptera
- Family: Syrphidae
- Subfamily: Eristalinae
- Tribe: Milesiini
- Genus: Blera
- Species: B. armillata

Binomial name
- Blera armillata (Osten Sacken, 1875)

Synonyms
- Criorrhina armillata Osten Sacken, 1875; Cynorhina hunteri Curran, 1925; Cynorhina pacifica Curran, 1953

Species of fly

Blera armillata, the orange-faced wood fly, is an uncommon species of syrphid fly first officially described by Osten Sacken in 1875. Hoverflies get their names from the ability to remain nearly motionless while in flight. The adults are also known as flower flies for they are commonly found around and on flowers, from which they get both energy-giving nectar and protein-rich pollen. The larvae are of the rat-tailed type, feeding on exuding sap or in the rot holes of trees.

== Distribution ==
External map

Widely distributed in North America

== Description ==
For terms see Morphology of Diptera.

External images

The combination of entirely black abdomen, pale scutum and black gena distinguishes this from most other Blera .

Length 10–14 mm

Head

The face and front above the antennae are honey-yellow. There is a black spot on the gena. The upper part of front and vertex are blackish-bronze in color, with some dull orange. The antennae are yellow with a black arista.

Thorax

The scutum, scutellum and postpronotum are a greenish-bronze color, clothed with erect dull orange pile. The pleurae areblack.

Abdomen

The abdomen is black, shining and clothed with black pile. There is a small tuft of yellow pile on each side at the base.

Wing

Two-thirds of the wings near the thorax are tinged with yellow, the remainder is gray extends along the posterior margin as far as the axillary incision. The vein R_{4+5} is almost straight and joins the costa (C) just before the tip of the wing. The first posterior cell (_{r4+5}) is acute apically and extends almost to the wing margin before the tip. The halteres (#9) are yellow.

Legs

The coxa and about two thirds of the femur are black with the end of the femur yellow. The tibiae are mostly yellow, a black ring in the middle. The three basal joints of the tarsi are of a yellow. The last two tarsal joints are black.

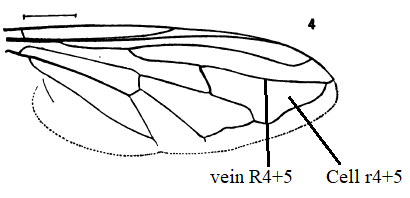
Blera wing veins

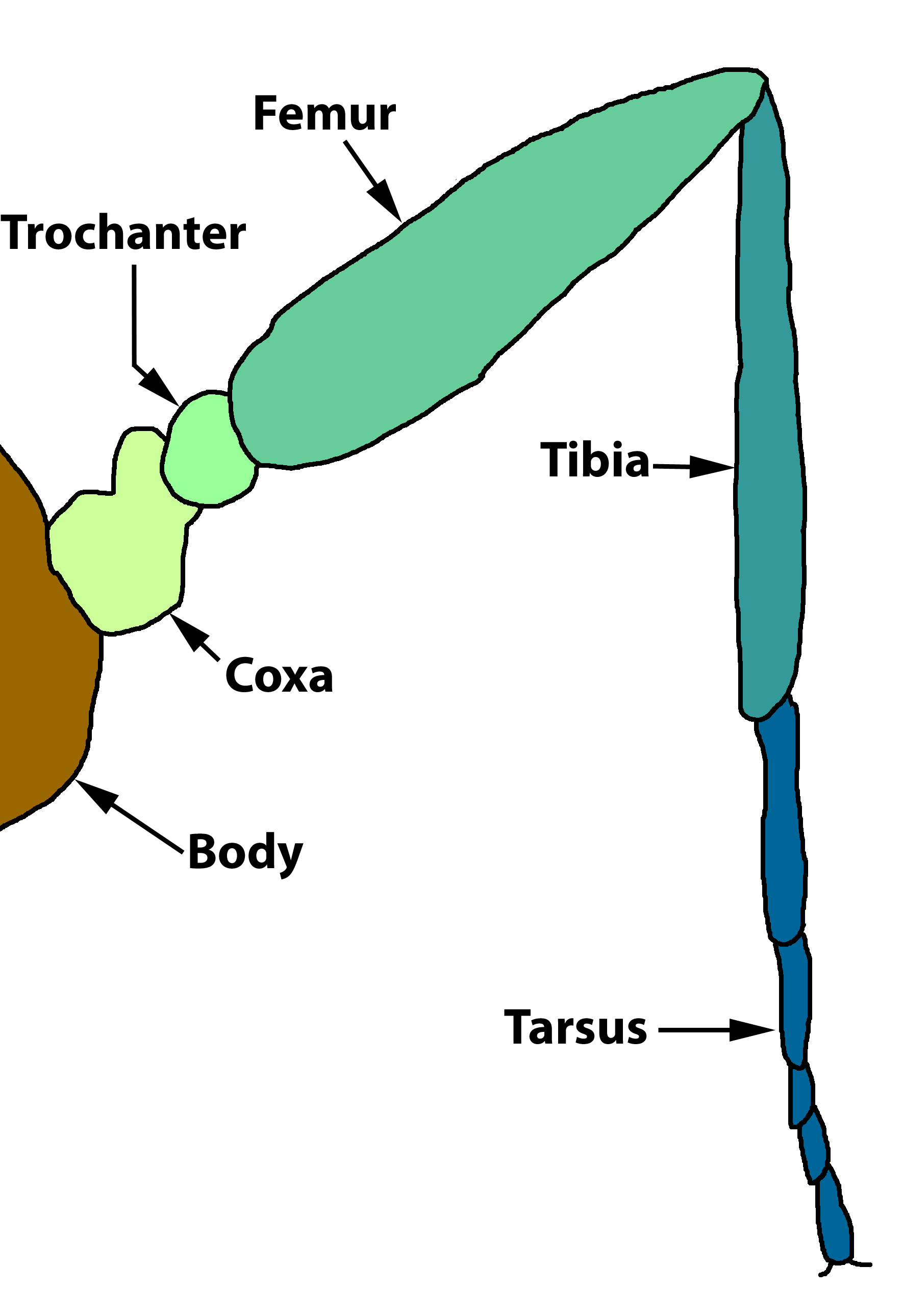
Insect leg

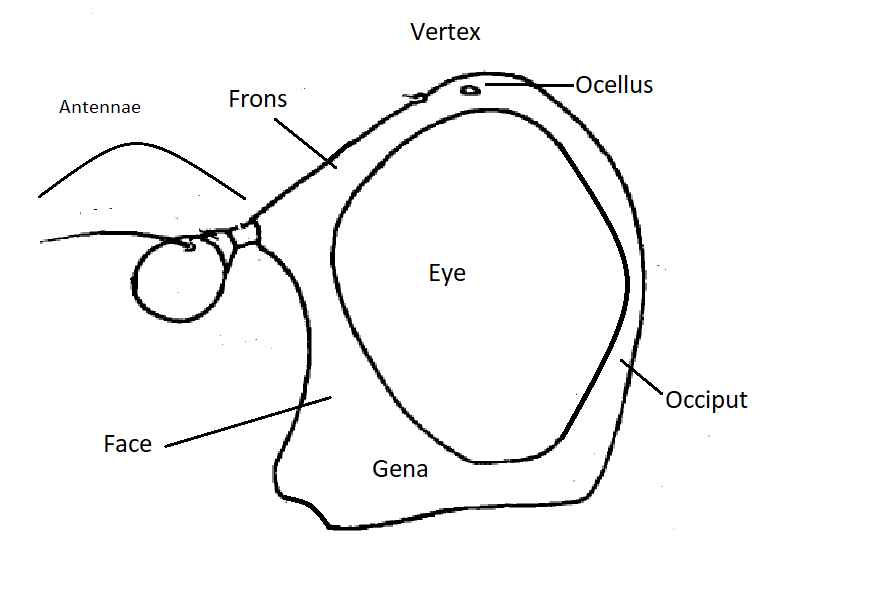
profile syrphid head

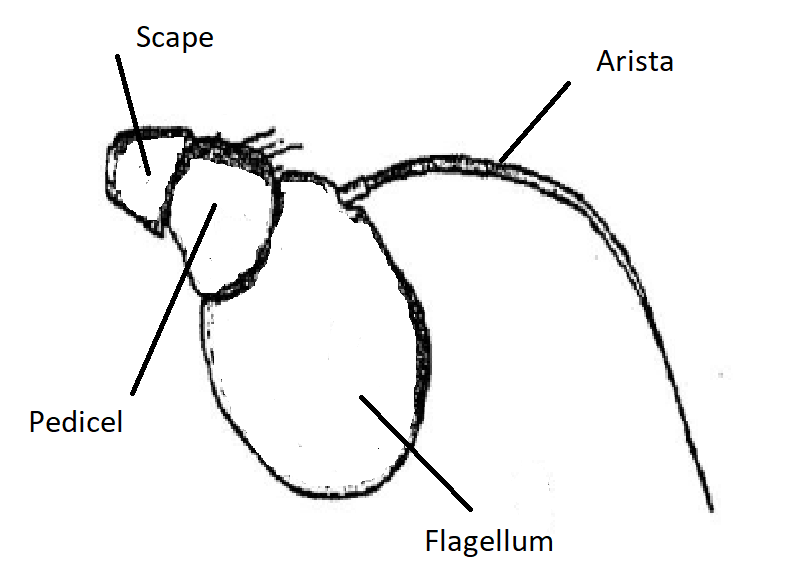
Antenna syrphid

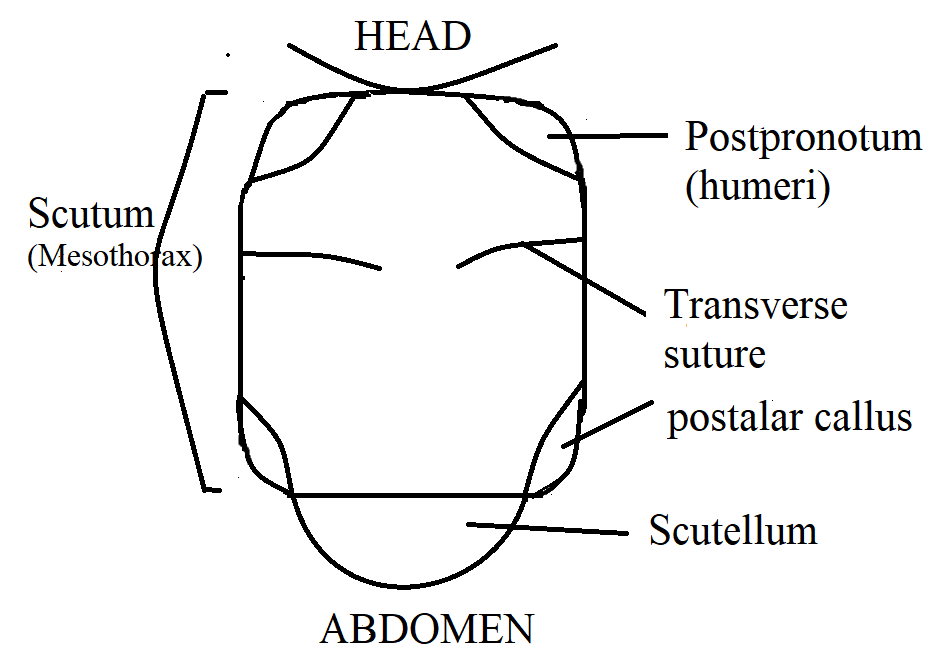
dorsal view of Syrphid thorax
