= Blera nigripes =

Scientific classification
- Kingdom: Animalia
- Phylum: Arthropoda
- Class: Insecta
- Order: Diptera
- Family: Syrphidae
- Subfamily: Eristalinae
- Tribe: Milesiini
- Genus: Blera
- Species: B. nigripes

Binomial name
- Blera nigripes (Curran, 1925)

Synonyms
- Cynorhina nigripes Curran, 1925

Species of fly

Blera nigripes is a species of hoverfly in the family Syrphidae.

== Distribution ==
Canada, United States.
