= Blera nitens =

Scientific classification
- Kingdom: Animalia
- Phylum: Arthropoda
- Clade: Pancrustacea
- Class: Insecta
- Order: Diptera
- Family: Syrphidae
- Subfamily: Eristalinae
- Tribe: Milesiini
- Genus: Blera
- Species: B. nitens

Binomial name
- Blera nitens (Stackelberg, 1923)

Synonyms
- Cynorrhina nitens Stackelberg, 1923; Cynorrhina nitens var. pallipesStackelberg, 1923

Species of fly

Blera nitens is a species of hoverfly in the family Syrphidae.

== Distribution ==
Russia.
