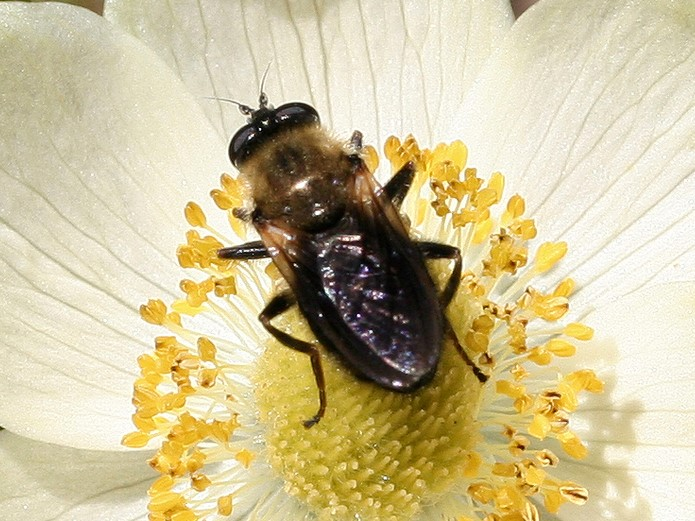

Scientific classification
- Kingdom: Animalia
- Phylum: Arthropoda
- Class: Insecta
- Order: Diptera
- Family: Syrphidae
- Subfamily: Eristalinae
- Tribe: Milesiini
- Genus: Blera
- Species: B. robusta

Binomial name
- Blera robusta (Curran, 1922)

Synonyms
- Cynorhina robusta Curran, 1922

= Blera robusta =

Species of fly

Blera robusta, the greenish wood fly, is a rare species of syrphid fly first officially described by Curran in 1922. Hoverflies get this name from the ability to remain nearly motionless while in flight. The adults are also known as flower flies, for they are commonly found around and on the flowers from which they get both energy-giving nectar and protein rich pollen. The larvae are of the rat-tailed type, feeding on exuding sap or in the rot holes of trees.

== Distribution ==
This is a Nearctic species located in the Northwestern United States and in Southwestern Canada. External map

== Description ==
For terms see Morphology of Diptera.

=== Size ===
11 mm (0.43 in).

=== Head ===
The front is shining black with black pile. The sides are somewhat narrowed above. The face is mostly glossy brownish black but with an area of yellow immediately below the antennae and at the sides. The gena is black with yellow pile. The face is thinly covered with silvery pollen. The side margins of the face covered sparsely with whitish pile. In profile the sub-keel-shaped face is slightly produced below the middle, indicating a long brown and black pilose tubercle. The pile under the eyes is yellowish. The antennae are black with a reddish brown circular flagellum. The arista is black. The frontal prominence is narrowly reddish apically. The pile, on the lower half of the occiput is brown on the lower half and black on the upper half, with areas of grayish white pollen.

=== Thorax ===
The dorsum of the thorax (scutum) is shining blue-black and thickly clothed with long, pale yellow pile. The scutellum is shining black and covered with moderately long pale yellow pile. The pleurae margined with reddish except below. The sides are bare except on the meso and sternopleura that are covered with long yellow pile.

=== Abdomen ===
The abdomen is black pilose except the immediate basal corners which bear yellow pile and wholly shining black, with a strong purplish reflection, The first two ventral segments are yellow apically at the sides.

=== Wing ===
The wings are moderately brownish, less so outwardly, with conspicuously yellow bases. The stigma is faintly brownish. The calypters and fringe are whitish yellow. The halteres (#9) are yellow. The vein R_{4+5} is almost straight and joins the costa just before the tip of the wing. The first posterior cell r_{4+5} is acute apically and extends almost to the wing margin before the tip.

=== Legs ===
The legs are blackish covered in short black pile, somewhat longer on the femora. The femora are tipped with yellow. The bases and ends of the tibiae are yellow as are the first three joints of the anterior four and second and third of the hind tarsi .

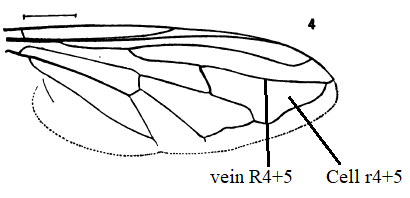
Blera wing veins

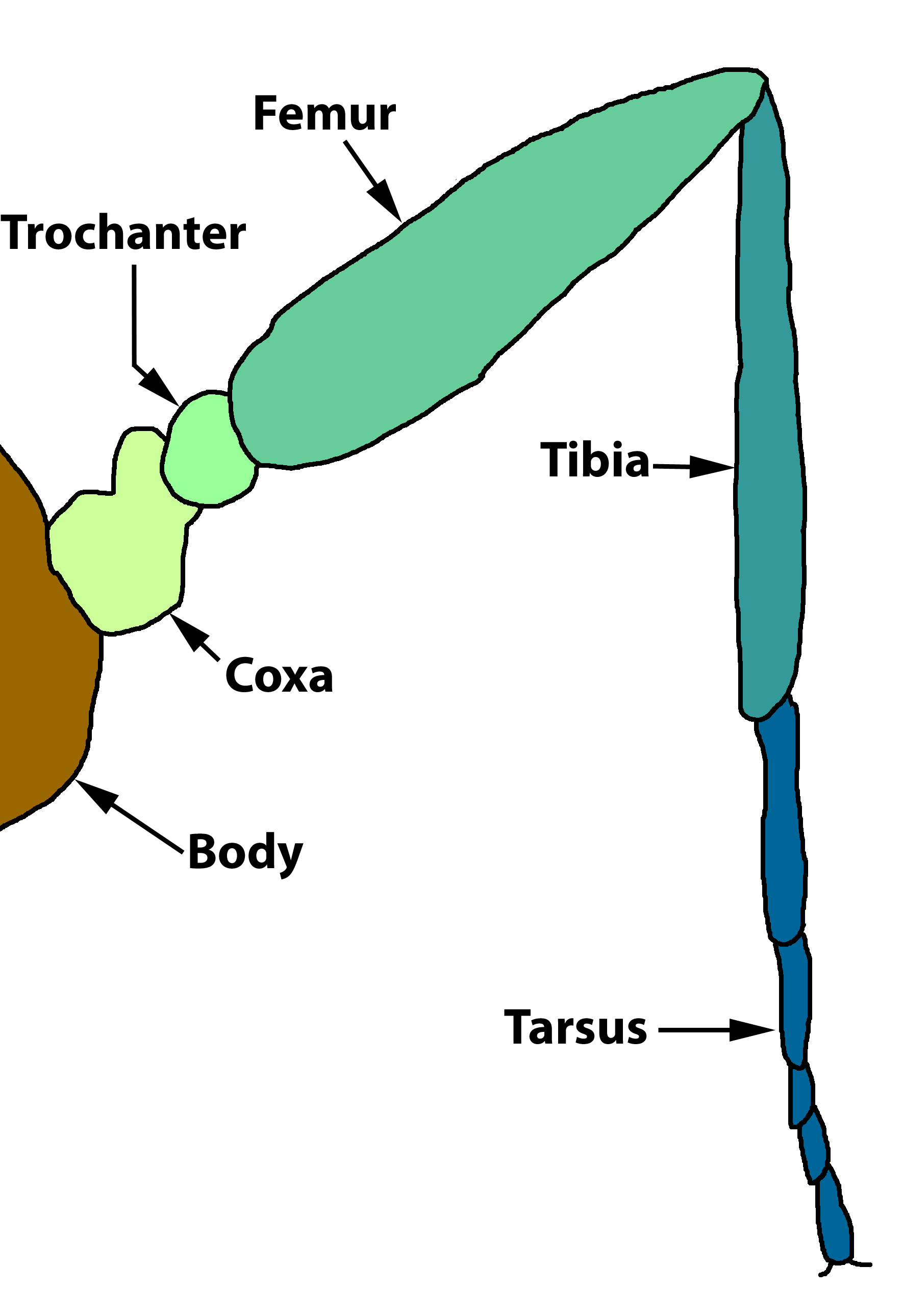
Insect leg

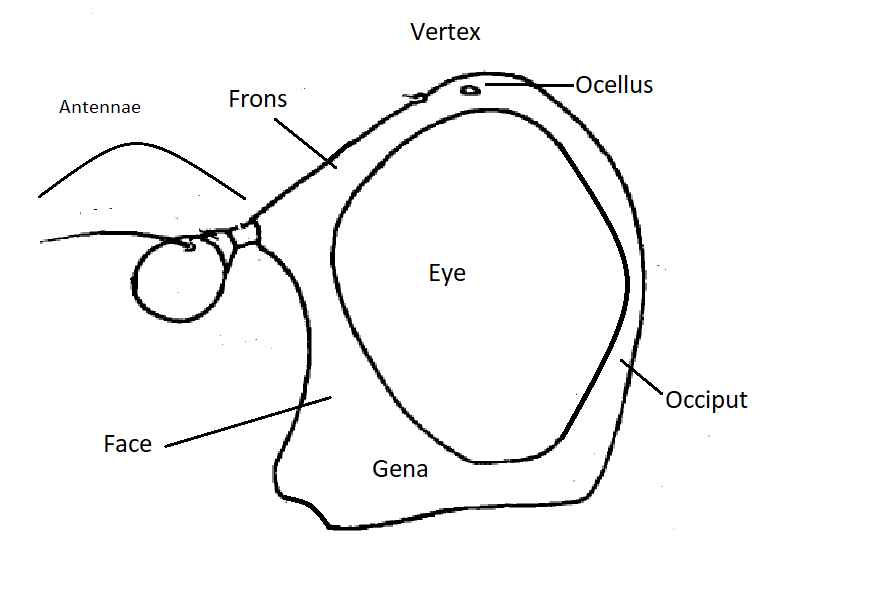
profile syrphid head

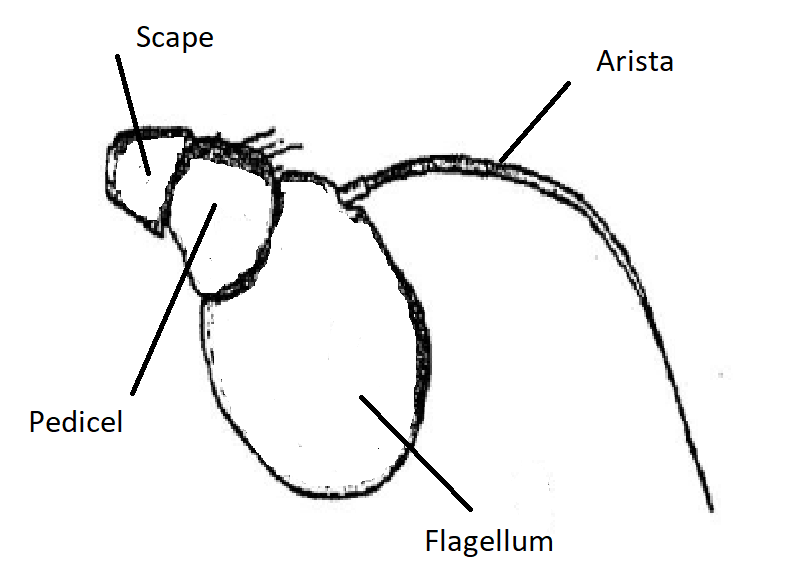
Antenna syrphid

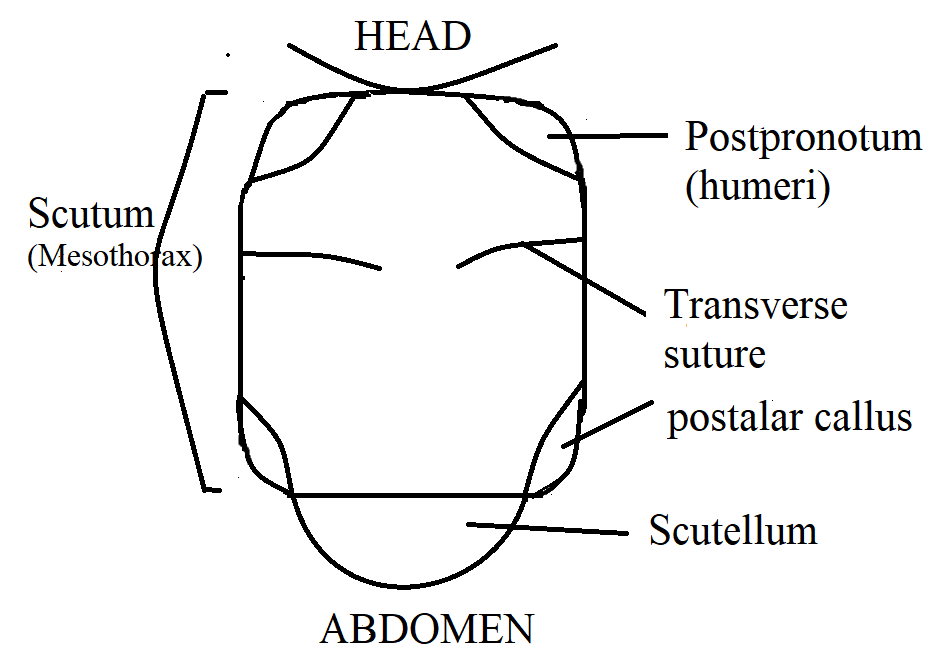
Dorsal view of Syrphid thorax
