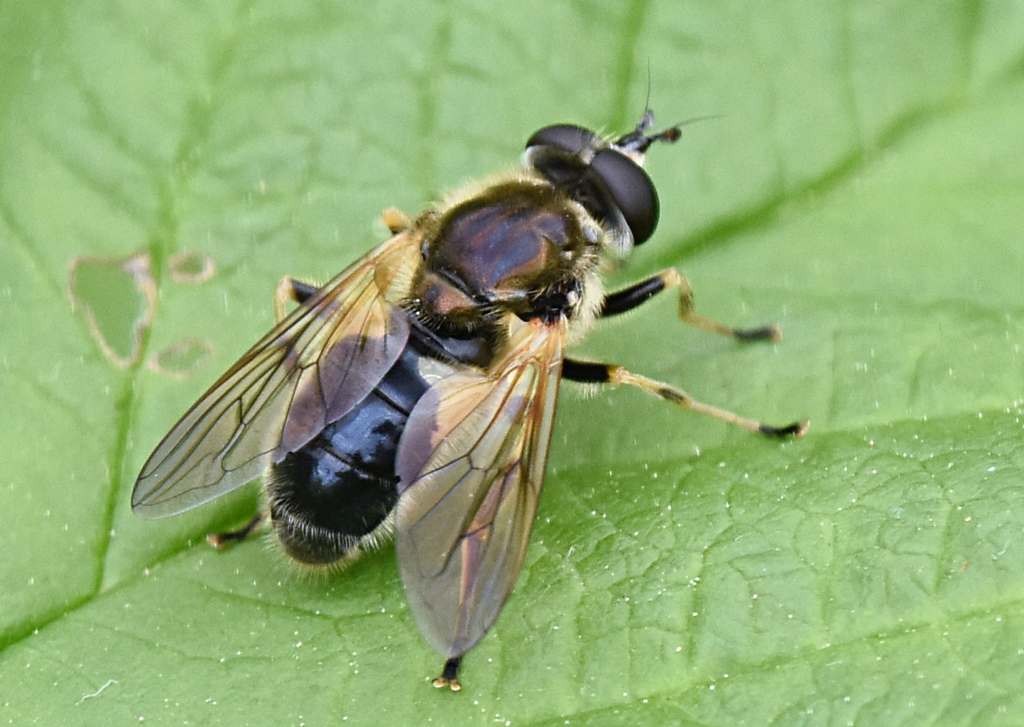

Scientific classification
- Kingdom: Animalia
- Phylum: Arthropoda
- Class: Insecta
- Order: Diptera
- Family: Syrphidae
- Subfamily: Eristalinae
- Tribe: Milesiini
- Genus: Blera
- Species: B. badia

Binomial name
- Blera badia (Walker, 1849)

Synonyms
- Eristalis intersistens Walker, 1849; Milesia ischiaca Harris, 1835; Xylota badia Walker, 1849

= Blera badia =

Species of fly

Blera badia, the Common Wood Fly, is a common species of syrphid fly first officially described by Walker in 1849. Hoverflies get their names from the ability to remain nearly motionless while in flight. The adults are also known as flower flies, for they are commonly found around and on flowers, from which they get both energy-giving nectar and protein-rich pollen. The larvae are of the rat-tailed type, feeding on exuding sap or in the rot holes of trees.

== Distribution ==
External map This is a nearctic species that is widely distributed in Eastern and Central North America.

== Description ==
For terms, see Morphology of Diptera.

External images

Size
10 to 11 mm
Head

The frontal triangle is black, shining, with dust near the orbits. The face is yellowish white and thickly covered with silvery dust. There is a medial shining black stripe (vitta) from just below the antennae to the oral cavity. The gena is shining black from near the eye to the oral opening. The antennae are black, with the flagellum more brow and a brown arista. The occiput is black, with whitish pile and thickly covered with grayish dust.

Thorax

The thorax and postpronotum are greenish-black, shining, with rather long dusky pile. The pile more abundant and whitish on the pleurae.

Abdomen

The abdomen is a deep shining greenish-black, with short erect black pile and on the sides and on the last segment the pile is longer and yellowish white. The second segment has on the sides large yellow triangles extending for the whole length of the segment and the triangles are continuing on the side of the third segment, narrowly in the male, more broadly in the female. The triangles are covered with abundant yellow pile. Genitalia described by Metcalf in 1921

Wing

The vein _{R4+5} is almost straight and joins the costa(C) just before the tip of the wing. The first posterior cell (r_{4+5}) is acute apically and extends almost to the wing margin before the tip.

Legs

The legs are black and yellow with black or yellow pile matching the color of the leg. The front femur is black, except the tips at both joints are yellow. The front tibia is yellow with a back ring near the tarsi. The front tarsi pale yellow, except the last three tarsomeres are black. Middle legs, similar to the description of the front legs. The hind femur is mostly yellow except a wide black preapical ring. The hind tibia black with yellow at the joints. The hind tarsi are yellow, with the last three tarsomeres black.

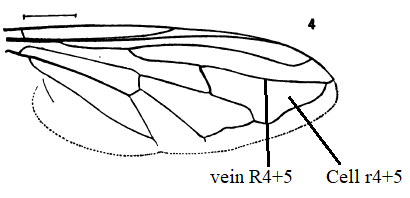
Blera wing veins

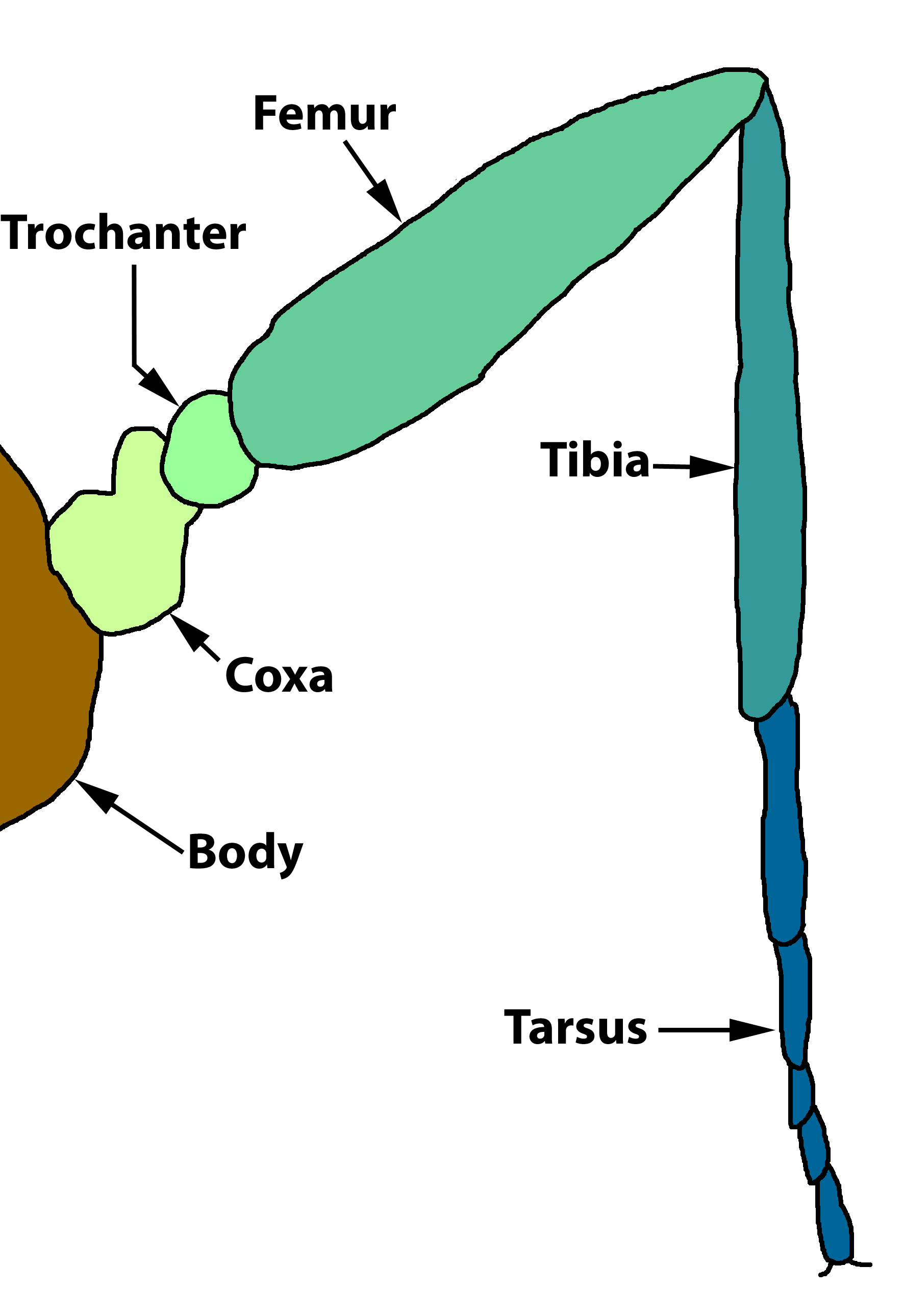
Insect leg

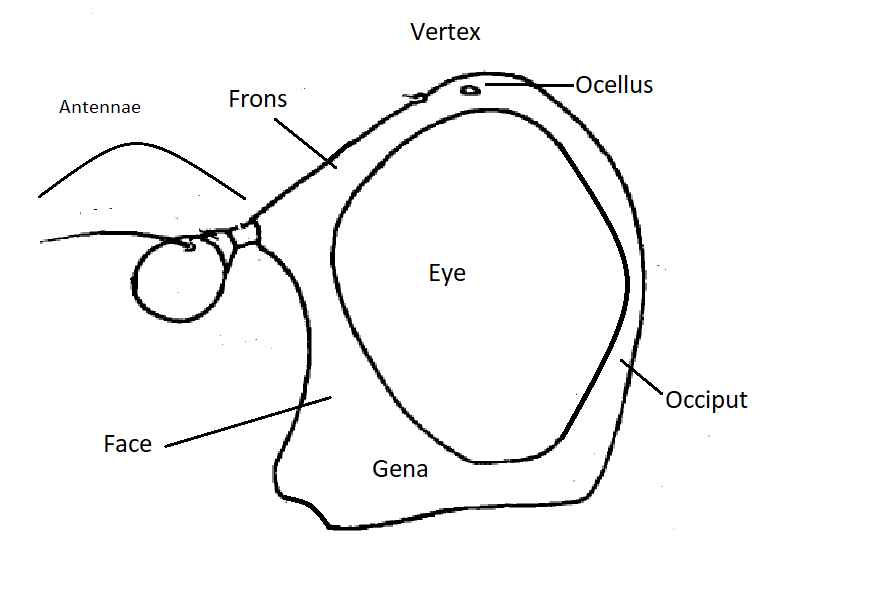
profile syrphid head

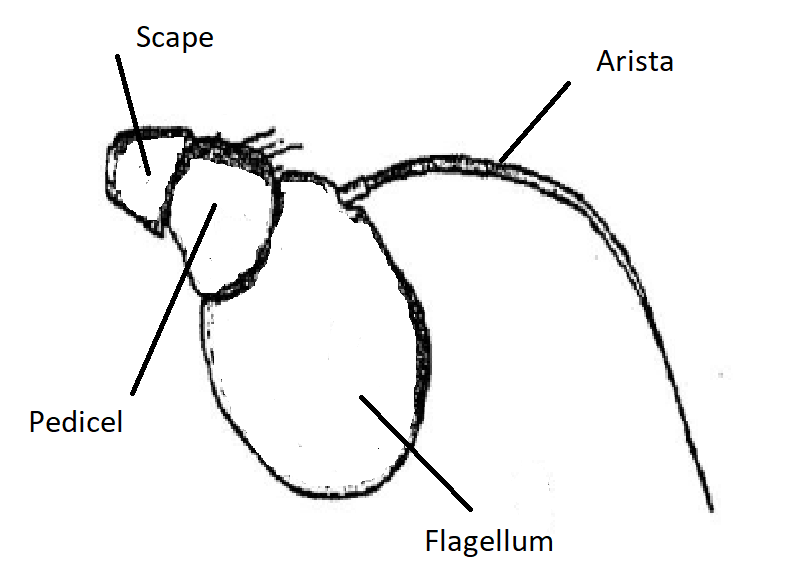
Antenna syrphid

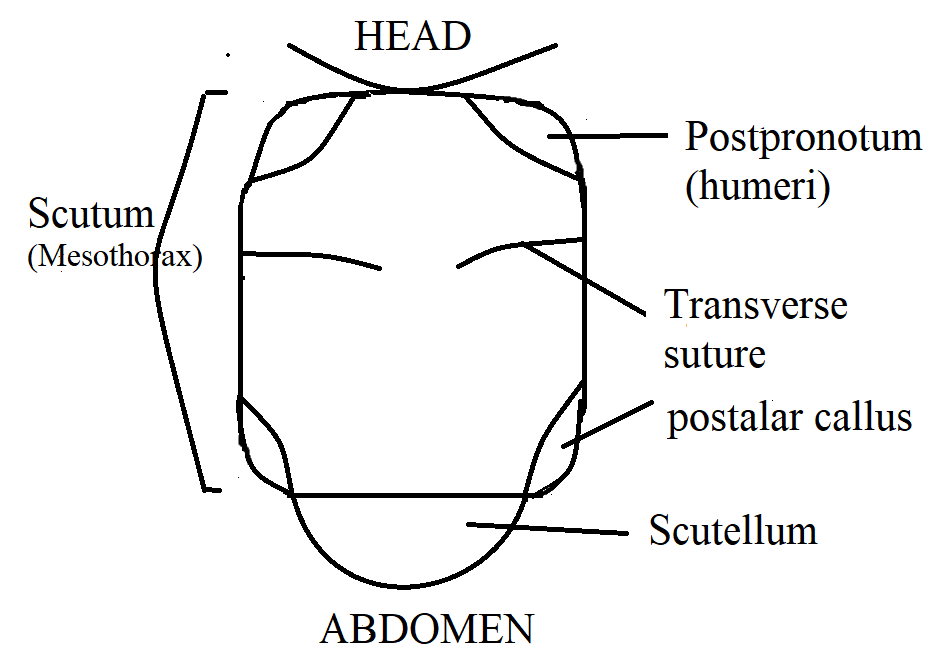
dorsal view of Syrphid thorax
