= Blera shirakii =

Scientific classification
- Kingdom: Animalia
- Phylum: Arthropoda
- Class: Insecta
- Order: Diptera
- Family: Syrphidae
- Subfamily: Eristalinae
- Tribe: Milesiini
- Genus: Blera
- Species: B. shirakii

Binomial name
- Blera shirakii Barkalov & Mutin, 1991

Synonyms
- Xylota basalis Shiraki, 1968

Species of fly

Blera shirakii is a species of hoverfly in the family Syrphidae.

== Distribution ==
Japan.
