= Blera ambigua =

Scientific classification
- Kingdom: Animalia
- Phylum: Arthropoda
- Class: Insecta
- Order: Diptera
- Family: Syrphidae
- Subfamily: Eristalinae
- Tribe: Milesiini
- Genus: Blera
- Species: B. ambigua

Binomial name
- Blera ambigua (Shiraki, 1968)

Synonyms
- Myolepta ambiguum Shiraki, 1968

Species of fly

Blera ambigua is a species of hoverfly in the family Syrphidae.

== Distribution ==
Japan.
