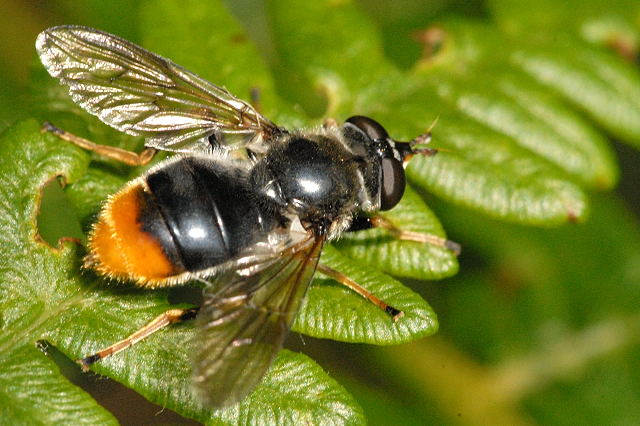
- female

Conservation status
- Least Concern (IUCN 3.1)

Scientific classification
- Kingdom: Animalia
- Phylum: Arthropoda
- Class: Insecta
- Order: Diptera
- Family: Syrphidae
- Subfamily: Eristalinae
- Tribe: Milesiini
- Genus: Blera
- Species: B. fallax

Binomial name
- Blera fallax (Linnaeus, 1758)

Synonyms
- Musca fallax Linnaeus, 1758; Blera nipponica Shiraki, 1968; Musca ruficaudis De Geer, 1776; Syrphus seminiger Panzer, 1804; Syrphus semirufus Fabricius, 1794

= Blera fallax =

Species of fly

Blera fallax, the pine hoverfly or roodkapje, is a rare species of hoverfly normally associated with mature pine trees in Northern and Central Europe.

== Distribution and habitat ==
Blera fallax is found in northern and central Eurasia from central Scandinavia east to Siberia and Japan, with a relict population in Scotland. At lower latitudes they are typically found in mountain forests where there are more pine and spruce, even up to subalpine dwarf mountain pine (Pinus mugo) forests. They prefer pine forests, particularly Scots pine (Pinus sylvestris) but also other pine species and spruce (Picea where there is high humidity and rotting dead timber.

== Biology ==
Blera fallax larva, which are of the rat-tailed maggot type, normally develop in damp rot holes of felled or fallen pine trees, notably the Scots pine, though it will occur with other conifers. Preference is for large stumps where there has been some heartwood softening by the fungus Phaeolus schweinitzii. Adult flies have been seen feeding on wild raspberry flowers, but little else is known about adult behaviour. Other authors have recorded the adults feeding on a wide ariety of flowers. The adult pine hoverflies have been observed sunning on the cut ends of conifer stumps and on the ground next to cut or fallen trees, The males fly fast and low through the forest clearing, through or close to the vegetation, especially close to clumps of plants, such a raspberries, that are in flower.

== Conservation ==
Blera fallax has an isolated relict subpopulation in the pine forests of northern Scotland. In 2008, attempts had been made on RSPB sites to create artificial rot holes in felled pine stumps. These attempts led to a slight increase in numbers of adults in some areas, though numbers were still very low and prompted some concern. In 2016, the species was only found at two sites in Strathspey, Scotland. The Scottish subpopulation of Blera fallax was deemed to be critically endangered and "as rare as the Scottish wildcat and even less common than the giant panda".

In 2016, the Royal Zoological Society of Scotland began to breed Blera fallax larvae as part of a conservation breeding programme at Highland Wildlife Park. In April 2019, the programme announced their first captive adult flies, which were raised as larvae in jam jars and pupated in hummus pots. In 2020, the programme reported a then-record breeding season of 156 hatched larvae.

After the 2021 breeding season, in which 130 larvae had successfully pupated, the Highland Wildlife Park conducted staggered releases of larvae in October 2021 and March 2022 across three sites at RSPB Abernethy Forest and Glenmore Forest Park. In October 2022, the Rare Invertebrates in the Cairngorms (RIC) project conducted surveys in the previously-unoccupied pine stumps around Cairngorms National Park and concluded the pine hoverflies had completed a full breeding cycle and successfully bred a new generation of larvae in the wild.

As of June 2025, the Highland Wildlife Park announced they had and will continue to conduct yearly releases of "thousands of pine hoverflies" in the aforementioned protected sites over the summer to strengthen the reintroduced Blera fallax and enable habitat expansion.

=== In popular culture ===
In March 2021, Marvelous Europe, a video game publisher, donated £20,000 to the RIC project. Later that same month, they partnered with Scummy Mummies co-host Ellie Gibson to raise awareness for the Blera fallax conservation programme by hosting a Twitch livestream of Story of Seasons: Pioneers of Olive Town where participants would have the chance to name the hatched pine hoverfly larvae. On 26 March 2021, the company held a "seed grower contest", where entrants were provided with a seed pack and asked to post weekly updates, and the winner who had grown the tallest seed would be given the honor of naming the new hoverfly incubation room at Highland Wildlife Park.

In August 2025, Marvelous Europe and North America jointly announced plans to release Pine Hoverfly-themed outfit DLC pack for their upcoming title, Story of Seasons: Grand Bazaar, the net proceeds of which would go to the Royal Zoological Society of Scotland's RIC project.
