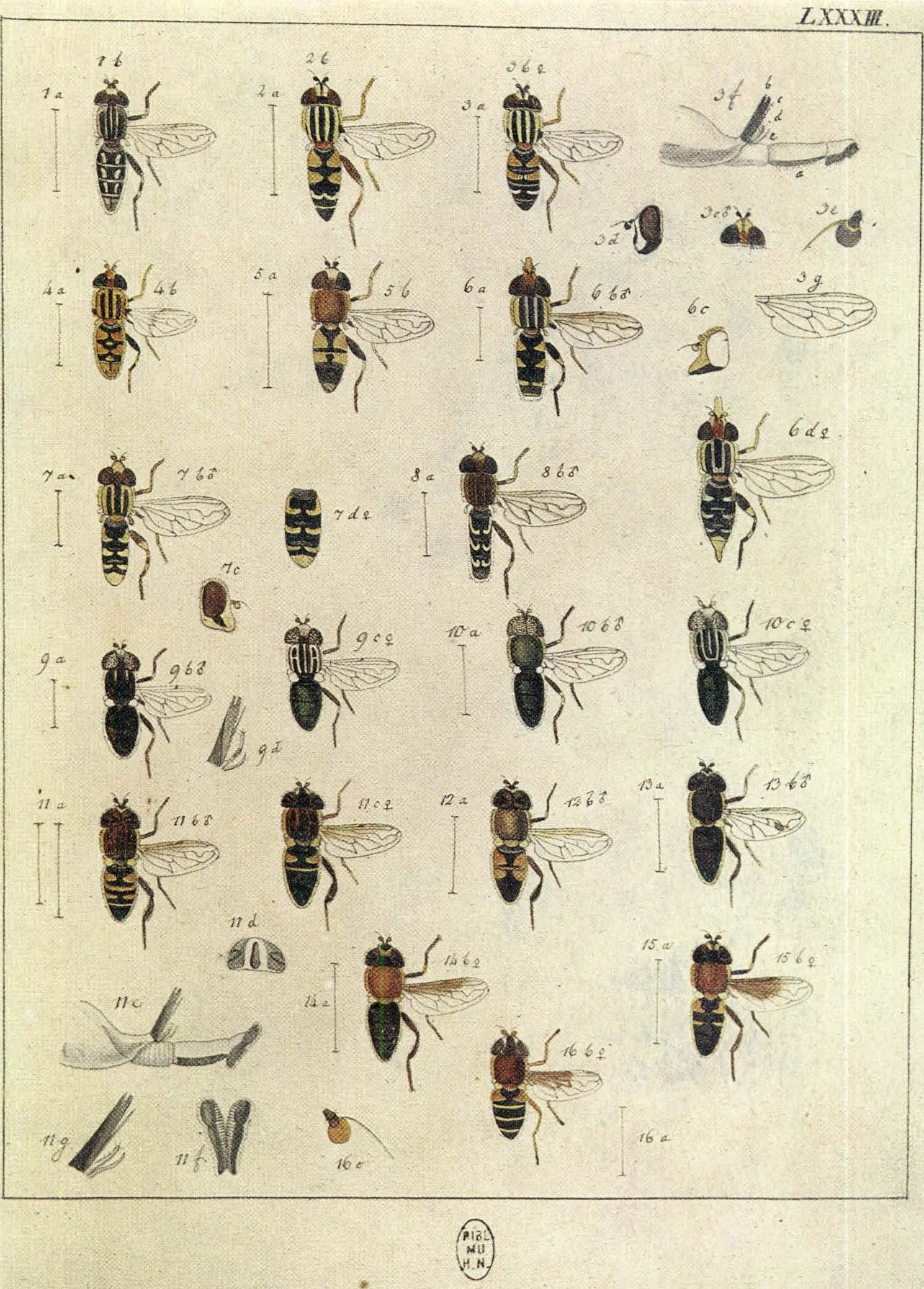
- Anasimyia lunulata in Meigen Europäischen Zweiflügeligen (figure 7)

Scientific classification
- Kingdom: Animalia
- Phylum: Arthropoda
- Class: Insecta
- Order: Diptera
- Family: Syrphidae
- Genus: Anasimyia
- Species: A. lunulata

Binomial name
- Anasimyia lunulata (Meigen, 1822)

= Anasimyia lunulata =

Species of fly

Anasimyia lunulata is a European species of hoverfly.

== Description ==
External images The wing length is 5 ·75-8 ·5 mm. Face extends beyond antennal knob in side view but is not pointed (see Anasimyia lineata). Male tergite 4 black pattern in the form of a V.Tergite 3 pale markings straight along posterior edge. Female tergites 3 and 4 with markings which are transverse along their posterior edge. Antennae entirely pale orange. The male genitalia are figured by Van der Goot (1981)

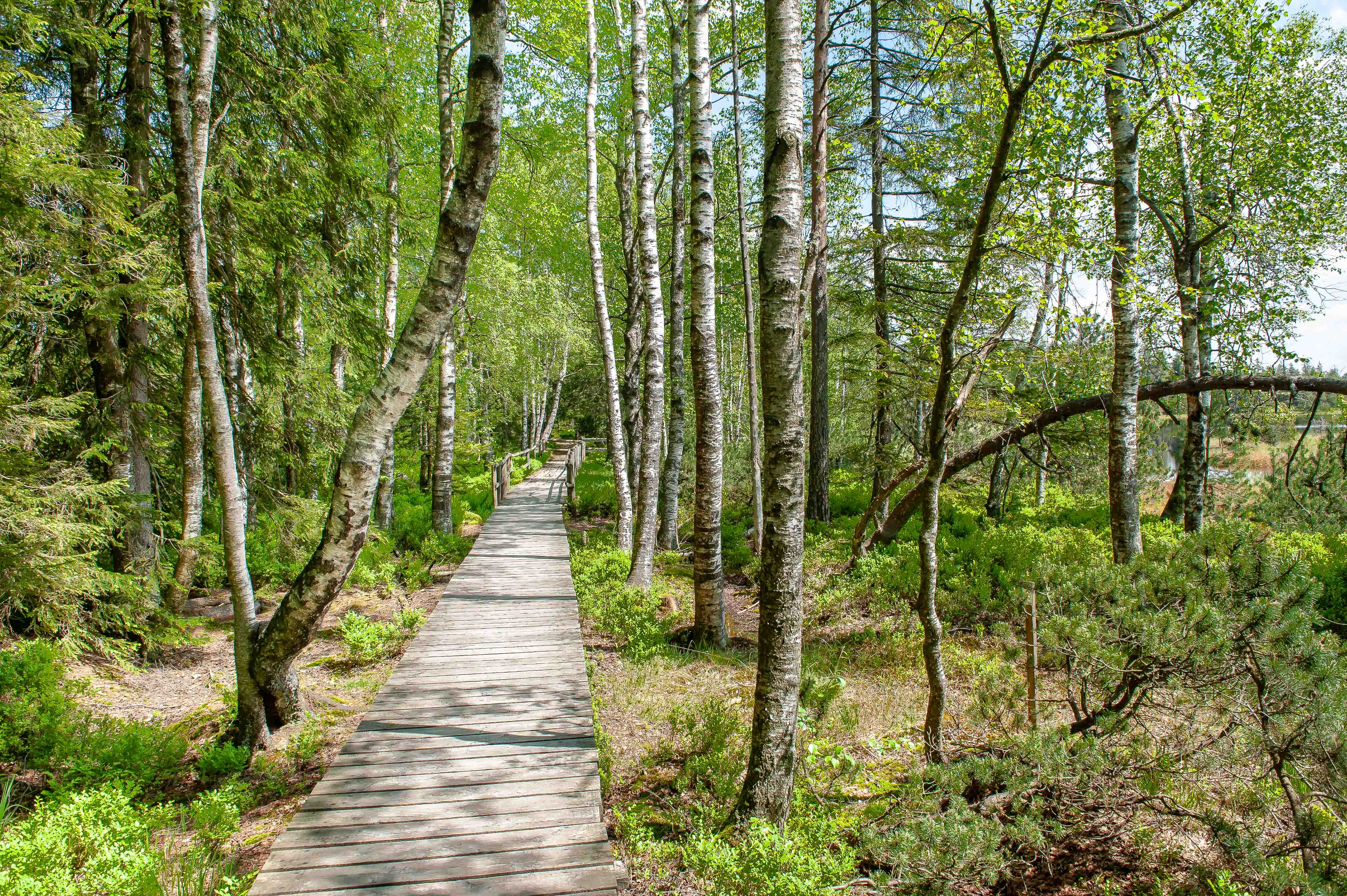
Habitat.Kaltenbronn.Germany

== Habits ==
A peatland (valley bogs and transition mires, cutover bogs) species found in similar habitats to Parhelophilus consimilis. More generally wetland including margins of dystrophic lakes, ponds and pools with Menyanthes and taiga wetlands. Flowers visited include Menyanthes, white umbels, Caltha, Ranunculus. Flies May to end August. The larva is aquatic and microphagous in rotting plant debris.

== Distribution ==
A. lunulata is a Palearctic species with a wide distribution in Europe East to central Siberia.
