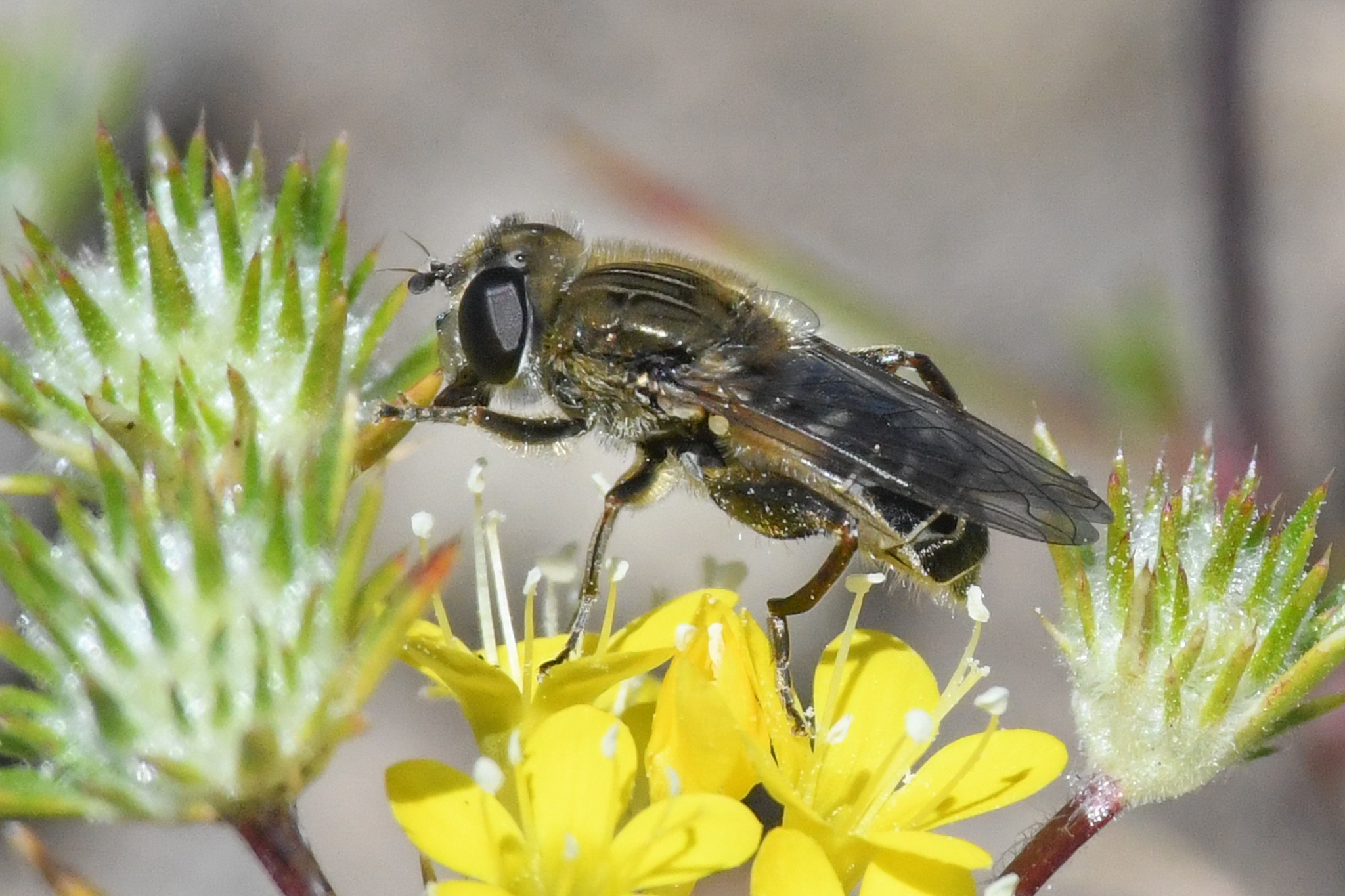
- Asemosyrphus polygrammus, common sickleleg, California

Scientific classification
- Kingdom: Animalia
- Phylum: Arthropoda
- Clade: Pancrustacea
- Class: Insecta
- Order: Diptera
- Family: Syrphidae
- Genus: Asemosyrphus
- Species: A. polygrammus

Binomial name
- Asemosyrphus polygrammus (Loew, 1872)

Synonyms
- Lejops polygrammus (Loew, 1872); Helophilus polygrammus Loew, 1872

= Asemosyrphus polygrammus =

Species of fly

Asemosyrphus polygrammus, the common sickleleg or northern sickleleg, is a species of rat-tail maggot fly in the family Syrphidae.

This species was formerly a member of the genus Lejops.
