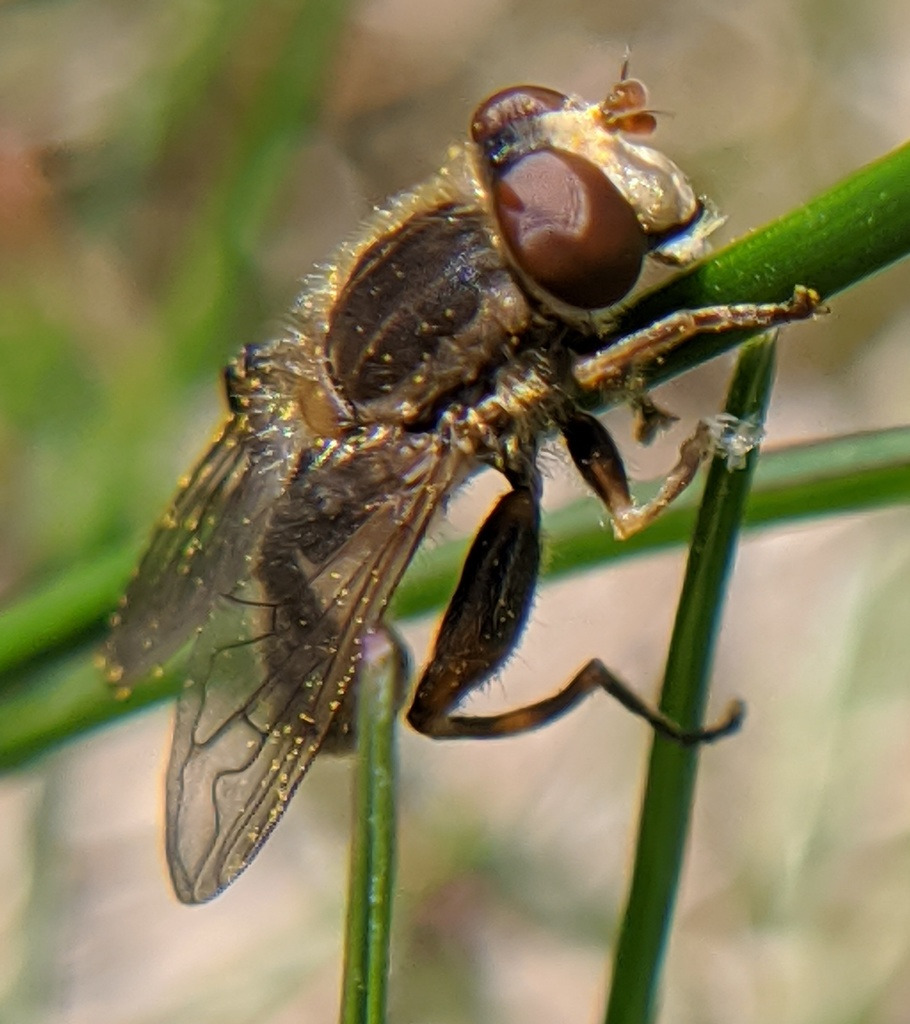

Scientific classification
- Domain: Eukaryota
- Kingdom: Animalia
- Phylum: Arthropoda
- Class: Insecta
- Order: Diptera
- Family: Syrphidae
- Subfamily: Eristalinae
- Tribe: Eristalini
- Subtribe: Helophilina
- Genus: Anasimyia
- Species: A. bilinearis

Binomial name
- Anasimyia bilinearis (Williston, 1887)

Synonyms
- Helophilus bilineatus Williston ,1887

= Anasimyia bilinearis =

Species of insect

Anasimyia bilinearis, the two-lined swamp fly, is an uncommon species of syrphid fly observed throughout North America. Hoverflies can remain nearly motionless in flight. The adults are also known as flower flies for they are commonly found on flowers from which they get both energy-giving nectar and protein-rich pollen. Larvae of this genus are of the rat-tailed type living in aquatic environments.
