= Parhelophilus porcus =

Scientific classification
- Kingdom: Animalia
- Phylum: Arthropoda
- Class: Insecta
- Order: Diptera
- Family: Syrphidae
- Tribe: Eristalini
- Subtribe: Helophilina
- Genus: Parhelophilus
- Species: P. porcus

Binomial name
- Parhelophilus porcus (Walker ,1849)

Species of fly

Parhelophilus porcus (Walker, 1849), the black bog fly, is an uncommon species of syrphid fly observed in Northern North America. Hoverflies can remain nearly motionless in flight. The adults are also known as flower flies for they are commonly found on flowers from which they get both energy-giving nectar and protein-rich pollen. The larvae are the long tailed "rat-tailed" type.
