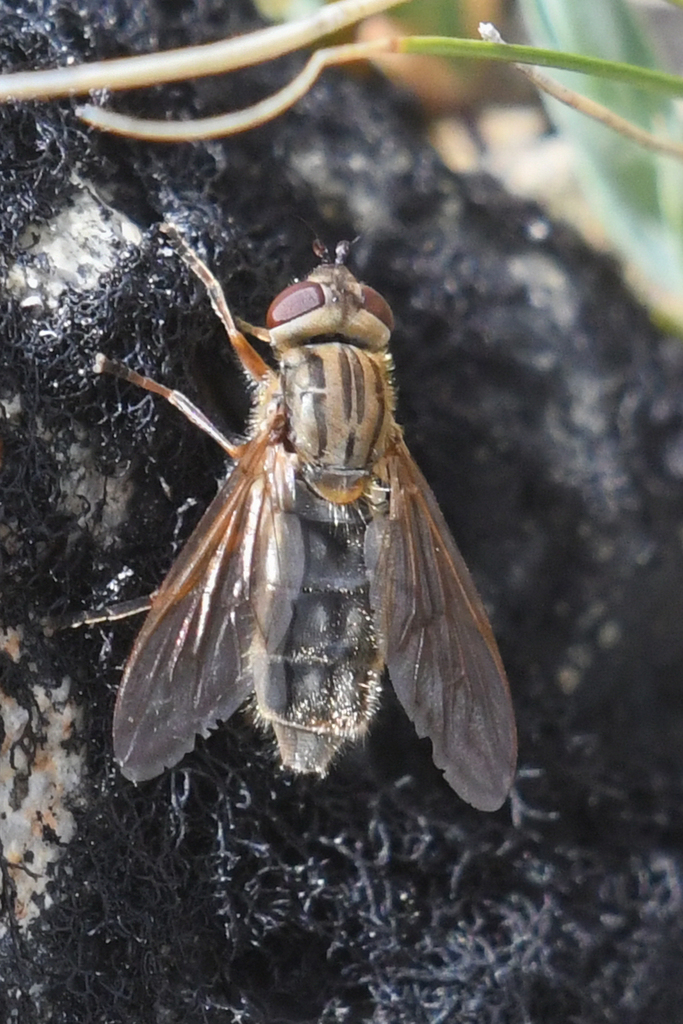

Scientific classification
- Kingdom: Animalia
- Phylum: Arthropoda
- Class: Insecta
- Order: Diptera
- Family: Syrphidae
- Tribe: Eristalini
- Subtribe: Helophilina
- Genus: Parhelophilus
- Species: P. brooksi

Binomial name
- Parhelophilus brooksi Curran, 1927

Synonyms
- Lunomyia pollinaria Fluke, 1939

= Parhelophilus brooksi =

Species of fly

Parhelophilus brooksi is a rare species of syrphid fly observed in northern North America. Hoverflies can remain nearly motionless in flight. The adults are also known as flower flies for they are commonly found on flowers, from which they get both energy-giving nectar and protein-rich pollen. The larvae of this species are unknown but in this genera larvae are of the tong-tailed type (rat-tailed)

== Distribution ==
This is a nearctic species found in British Columbia, Wisconsin, Minnesota and Quebec.
