= Austrophilus =

Scientific classification
- Kingdom: Animalia
- Phylum: Arthropoda
- Clade: Pancrustacea
- Class: Insecta
- Order: Diptera
- Family: Syrphidae
- Subfamily: Eristalinae
- Tribe: Eristalini
- Subtribe: Helophilina
- Genus: Austrophilus; Thompson, 2000.

Type species
- Helophilus terraereginae Ferguson, 1926

Genus of flies

Austrophilus is a genus of hoverflies. There are 5 known species, all found in the Australia region. Austrophilus is closely related to Habromyia.

== Species ==
- Austrophilus helophiloides (Walker, 1861)
- Austrophilus laticornis (Bigot, 1884)
- Austrophilus necopinus Thompson, 2000
- Austrophilus obscurus Thompson, 2000
- Austrophilus terraereginae (Ferguson, 1926)
