= Parhelophilus divisus =

Scientific classification
- Kingdom: Animalia
- Phylum: Arthropoda
- Class: Insecta
- Order: Diptera
- Family: Syrphidae
- Tribe: Eristalini
- Subtribe: Helophilina
- Genus: Parhelophilus
- Species: P. divisus

Binomial name
- Parhelophilus divisus (Loew, 1863)

Species of insect

Parhelophilus divisus ( Loew 1863 ) the yellow-legged bog fly, is a rare species of syrphid fly observed in the northeastern United States. Hoverflies can remain nearly motionless in flight. The adults are also known as flower flies for they are commonly found on flowers, from which they get both energy-giving nectar and protein rich pollen. The larvae are the long tailed "rat-tailed" type.
