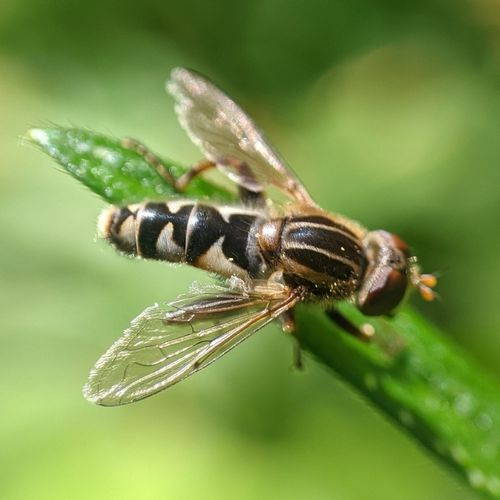

Scientific classification
- Domain: Eukaryota
- Kingdom: Animalia
- Phylum: Arthropoda
- Class: Insecta
- Order: Diptera
- Family: Syrphidae
- Tribe: Eristalini
- Subtribe: Helophilina
- Genus: Anasimyia
- Species: A. anausis

Binomial name
- Anasimyia anausis (Meigen 1822)

= Anasimyia anausis =

Species of insect

Anasimyia anausis (Meigen 1822), the moon-shaped swamp fly, is a fairly common species of syrphid fly observed across North America. Hoverflies can remain nearly motionless in flight. The adults are also known as flower flies for they are commonly found on flowers from which they get both energy-giving nectar and protein rich pollen. Larvae of this genus are of the rat-tailed type living in aquatic environments.
