= Anasimyia grisescens =

Scientific classification
- Domain: Eukaryota
- Kingdom: Animalia
- Phylum: Arthropoda
- Class: Insecta
- Order: Diptera
- Family: Syrphidae
- Tribe: Eristalini
- Subtribe: Helophilina
- Genus: Anasimyia
- Species: A. grisescens

Binomial name
- Anasimyia grisescens (Hull, 1943)

Synonyms
- Lejops grisescens Hull, 1943

Species of fly

Anasimyia grisescens , (Hull, 1943), the Long-spurred Swamp Fly , is a rare species of syrphid fly observed on the Atlantic coast of the United States. Syrphid flies are also known as Hover Flies or Flower Flies because the adults are frequently found hovering around flowers from which they feed on nectar and pollen. They are 7.2–10.1 mm (0.28–0.40 in) long. The larvae are unknown.
