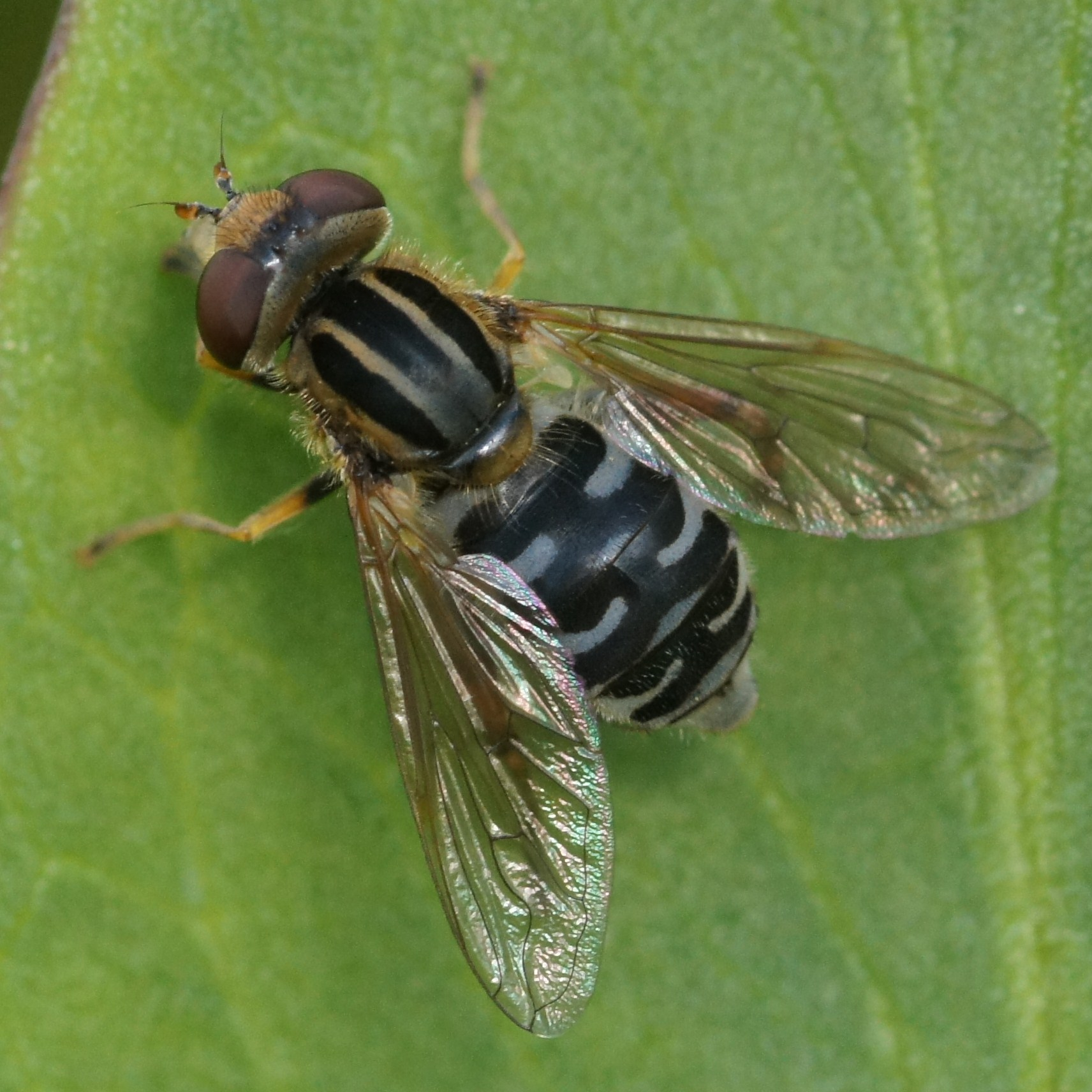
- Anasimyia interpuncta female

Scientific classification
- Kingdom: Animalia
- Phylum: Arthropoda
- Class: Insecta
- Order: Diptera
- Family: Syrphidae
- Subfamily: Eristalinae
- Tribe: Eristalini
- Subtribe: Helophilina
- Genus: Anasimyia
- Species: A. interpuncta

Binomial name
- Anasimyia interpuncta (Harris, 1776)

= Anasimyia interpuncta =

Species of fly

Anasimyia interpuncta is a European species of hoverfly.
