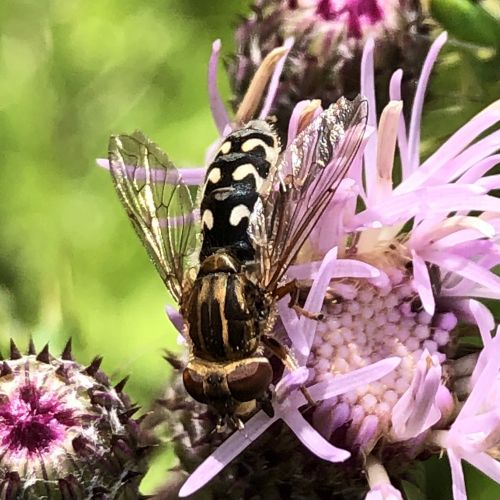
- Netherlands

Scientific classification
- Kingdom: Animalia
- Phylum: Arthropoda
- Class: Insecta
- Order: Diptera
- Family: Syrphidae
- Genus: Anasimyia
- Species: A. transfuga

Binomial name
- Anasimyia transfuga (Linnaeus, 1758)

= Anasimyia transfuga =

Species of fly

Anasimyia transfuga is a Palearctic species of hoverfly.

== Description ==
External images For terms see Morphology of Diptera
The wing length 6-8·25 mm. Dark ground colour with steeply inclined hooked markings (the inner limb is strongly oblique). Very similar to A. contracta, but transfuga has the lateral margins of tergite 2 less concave than in contracta. There are also differences in the grey dusting of the sternites (sternites 2 and 3 are completely grey dusted in the male of transfuga).

Keys and accounts

- Coe R.L. (1953) Syrphidae
- Van Veen, M. (2004) Hoverflies of Northwest Europe
- Van der Goot, V.S. (1981) De zweefvliegen van Noordwest - Europa en Europees Rusland, in het bijzonder van de Benelux
- Bei-Bienko, G.Y. & Steyskal, G.C. (1988) Keys to USSR insects. Diptera

== Habits ==
A wetland species found on tall emergent pond side vegetation, margins of mesotrophic pools and lakes with Scirpus or Sparganium. Flowers visited include Caltha palustris, Ranunculus repens, white umbellifers, Sonchus arvensis, Sorbus aucuparia and Taraxacum. Flies early May to July. The larva is aquatic and microphagous in rotting plant debris. Flies April to October.

== Distribution ==
A Palearctic species with a wide distribution in Europe East to Siberia.
