= Parhelophilus obsoletus =

Scientific classification
- Domain: Eukaryota
- Kingdom: Animalia
- Phylum: Arthropoda
- Class: Insecta
- Order: Diptera
- Family: Syrphidae
- Genus: Parhelophilus
- Species: P. obsoletus

Binomial name
- Parhelophilus obsoletus (Loew, 1863)

Synonyms
- Helophilus obsoletus Loew, 1863

Species of fly

Parhelophilus obsoletus (Loew, 1863), the Unadorned Bog Fly, is a fairly common species of syrphid fly observed across Canada and the northeastern and central United States. Hoverflies can remain nearly motionless in flight. The adults are also known as flower flies for they are commonly found on flowers, from which they get both energy-giving nectar and protein-rich pollen. The larvae are unknown.
