= Ohmyia =

Scientific classification
- Kingdom: Animalia
- Phylum: Arthropoda
- Class: Insecta
- Order: Diptera
- Family: Syrphidae
- Subfamily: Eristalinae
- Tribe: Eristalini
- Subtribe: Helophilina
- Genus: Ohmyia; Thompson, 1999
- Species: O. omya

Binomial name
- Ohmyia omya (Thompson, 1999)

Species of fly

Ohmyia omya is a species of South American hoverfly. It is the only species in the genus Ohmyia.
