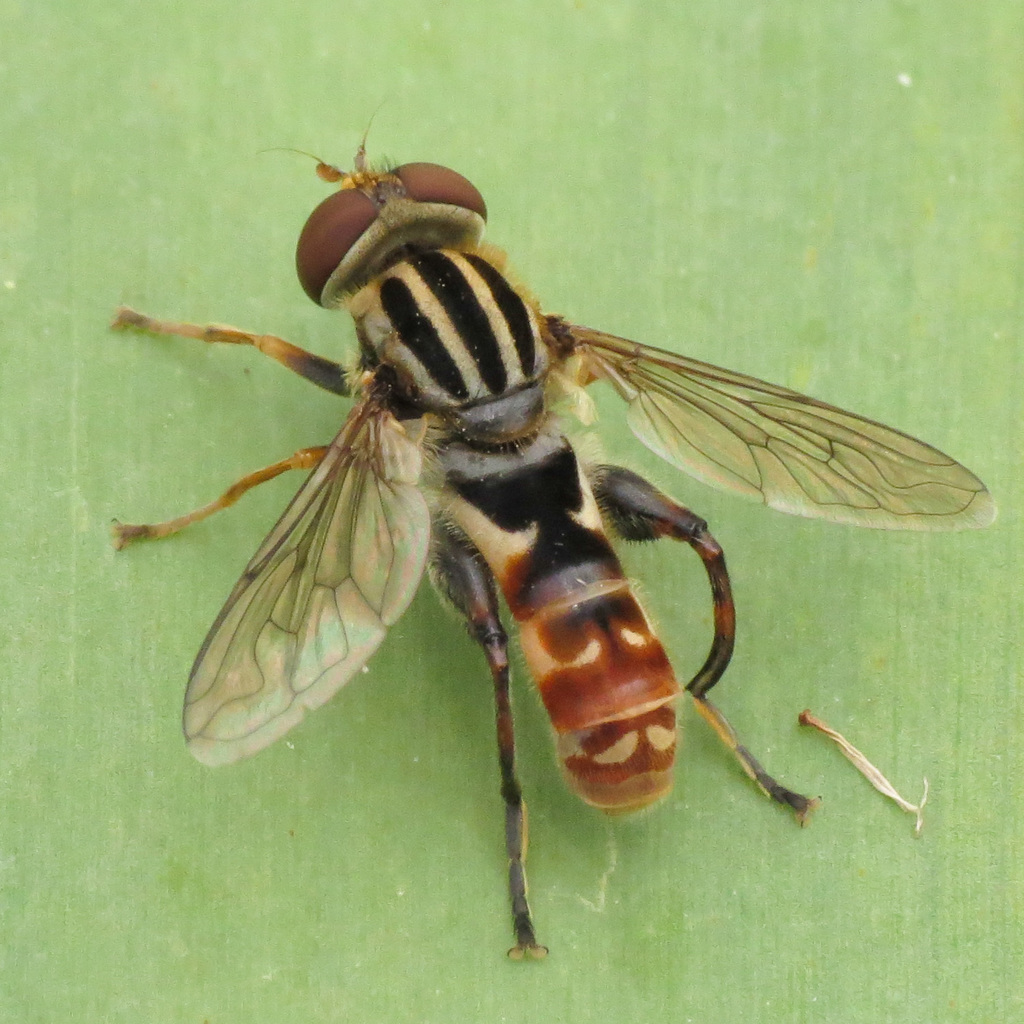

Scientific classification
- Kingdom: Animalia
- Phylum: Arthropoda
- Clade: Pancrustacea
- Class: Insecta
- Order: Diptera
- Family: Syrphidae
- Genus: Anasimyia
- Species: A. chrysostoma

Binomial name
- Anasimyia chrysostoma (Weidemann, 1830)

Synonyms
- Lejops chrysostomus Weidemann, 1830; Eristalis chrysostomus Weidemann, 1830; Lejops orion Hull, 1943; Lejops relictus Curran and Fluke, 1926

= Anasimyia chrysostoma =

Species of insect

Anasimyia chrysostoma, the lump-legged swamp fly, is a fairly common species of syrphid fly observed across the United States and Canada. Hoverflies can remain nearly motionless in flight. The adults are also known as flower flies for they are commonly found on flowers from which they get both energy-giving nectar and protein-rich pollen. Larvae of this genus are of the rat-tailed type living in aquatic environments.
