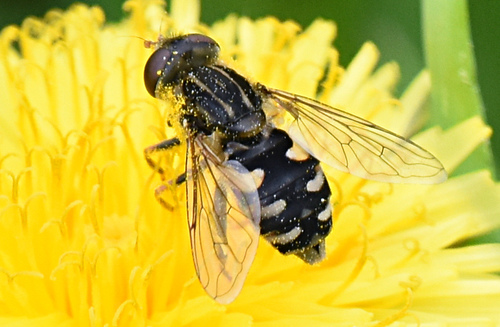

Scientific classification
- Domain: Eukaryota
- Kingdom: Animalia
- Phylum: Arthropoda
- Class: Insecta
- Order: Diptera
- Family: Syrphidae
- Genus: Parhelophilus
- Species: P. rex

Binomial name
- Parhelophilus rex Curran & Fluke, 1922

= Parhelophilus rex =

Species of fly

Parhelophilus rex (Curran and Fluke, 1922), the Dusky Bog Fly , is a fairly common species of syrphid fly observed in northern North America. Hoverflies can remain nearly motionless in flight. The adults are also known as flower flies for they are commonly found on flowers, from which they get both energy-giving nectar and protein-rich pollen. The larvae are unknown.
