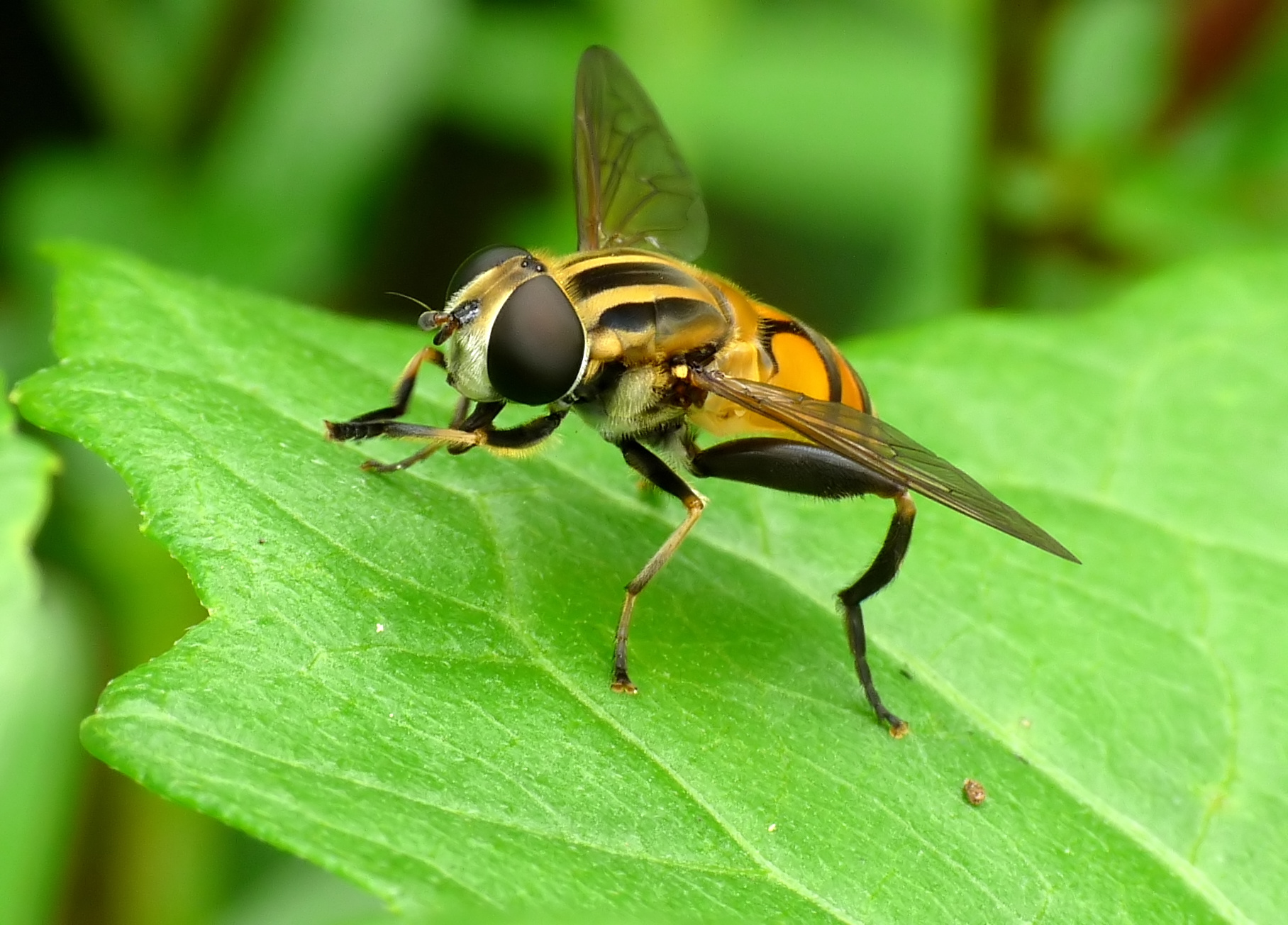
- Mesembrius insignis

Scientific classification
- Kingdom: Animalia
- Phylum: Arthropoda
- Class: Insecta
- Order: Diptera
- Family: Syrphidae
- Subfamily: Eristalinae
- Tribe: Eristalini
- Subtribe: Helophilina
- Genus: Mesembrius; Rondani, 1857

= Mesembrius =

Genus of flies

Mesembrius is a genus of hoverflies, containing over 50 described species.

== Selected species ==
Subgenus: Mesembrius – Old World tropics

- Mesembrius peregrinus (Loew, 1846)

Subgenus: Vadonimyia – Madagascar

- Mesembrius discophora Séguy, 1951

== Species ==
The following species are part of the genus Mesembrius:

- Mesembrius aduncatus
- Mesembrius africanus
- Mesembrius bengalensis
- Mesembrius caffer
- Mesembrius capensis
- Mesembrius cyanipennis
- Mesembrius discophorus
- Mesembrius formosanus
- Mesembrius gracilifolius
- Mesembrius hainanensis
- Mesembrius hilaris
- Mesembrius ingratus
- Mesembrius lagopus
- Mesembrius longipenitus
- Mesembrius madagascariensis
- Mesembrius minor
- Mesembrius morio
- Mesembrius niveiceps
- Mesembrius peregrinus
- Mesembrius perforatus
- Mesembrius quadrivittatus
- Mesembrius ruficauda
- Mesembrius senegalensis
- Mesembrius simplicipes
- Mesembrius strigilatus
- Mesembrius sulcus
- Mesembrius tarsatus
- Mesembrius tuberosus
- Mesembrius vestitus
