= Arctosyrphus =

Scientific classification
- Kingdom: Animalia
- Phylum: Arthropoda
- Class: Insecta
- Order: Diptera
- Family: Syrphidae
- Subfamily: Eristalinae
- Tribe: Eristalini
- Subtribe: Helophilina
- Genus: Arctosyrphus; Frey, 1918
- Species: A. willingii

Binomial name
- Arctosyrphus willingii (Smith, 1912)

Genus of fly

Arctosyrphus is a genus of rat-tail maggot flies in the family Syrphidae. This genus has a single species, Arctosyrphus willingii. It was formerly a member of the genus Lejops.
