= Chasmomma =

Scientific classification
- Kingdom: Animalia
- Phylum: Arthropoda
- Class: Insecta
- Order: Diptera
- Family: Syrphidae
- Subfamily: Eristalinae
- Tribe: Eristalini
- Subtribe: Helophilina
- Genus: Chasmomma; Bezzi, 1915

Genus of flies

Chasmomma is a genus of hoverflies.

== Species ==
- Chasmomma nigrum Curran, 1927
