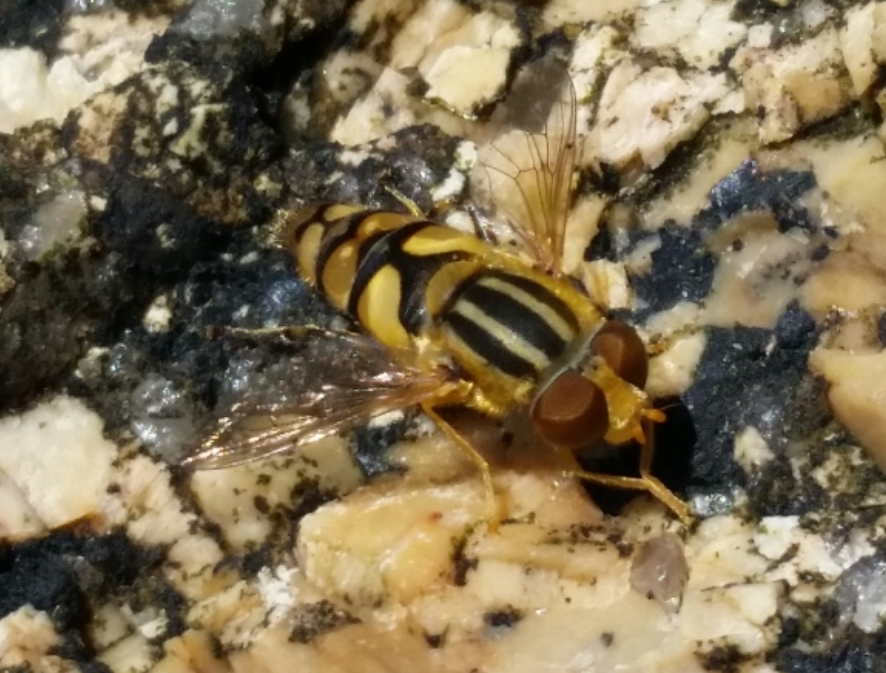

Scientific classification
- Domain: Eukaryota
- Kingdom: Animalia
- Phylum: Arthropoda
- Class: Insecta
- Order: Diptera
- Family: Syrphidae
- Genus: Parhelophilus
- Species: P. laetus

Binomial name
- Parhelophilus laetus (Loew, 1963)

Synonyms
- Helophilus aureopilis Townsend, 1895; Helophilus laetus Loew, 1863

= Parhelophilus laetus =

Species of insect

Parhelophilus laetus (Loew, 1863), the Common Bog Fly , is a common species of syrphid fly observed across northern North America. Hoverflies can remain nearly motionless in flight. The adults are also known as flower flies for they are commonly found on flowers, from which they get both energy-giving nectar and protein-rich pollen. The larvae are unknown.
