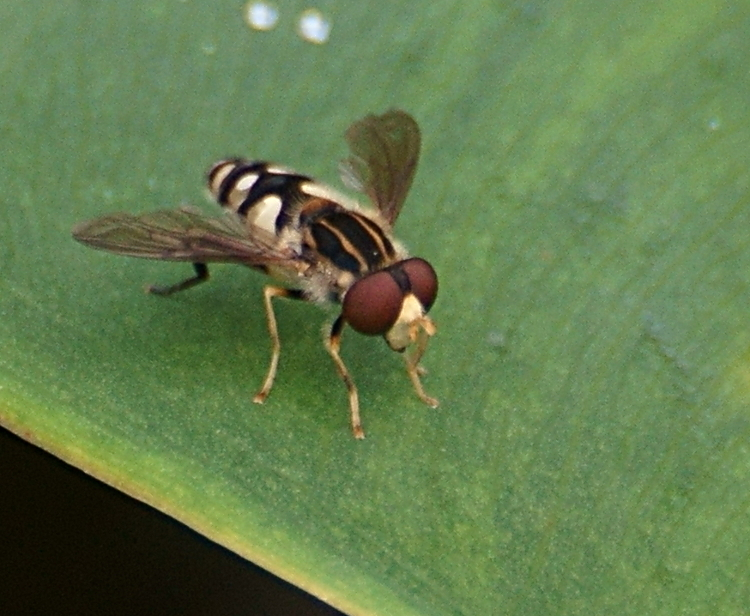

Scientific classification
- Kingdom: Animalia
- Phylum: Arthropoda
- Class: Insecta
- Order: Diptera
- Family: Syrphidae
- Genus: Parhelophilus
- Species: P. flavifacies

Binomial name
- Parhelophilus flavifacies (Bigot, 1883)

Synonyms
- Helophilus anniae Brimley, 1923; Helophilus flavifacies Bigot, 1883

= Parhelophilus flavifacies =

Species of fly

Parhelophilus flavifacies, the Black-legged Bog Fly, is a rare species of syrphid fly observed in the Eastern United States and Canada. Hoverflies can remain nearly motionless in flight. The adults are also known as flower flies for they are commonly found on flowers, from which they get both energy-giving nectar and protein-rich pollen. The larvae are the long tailed "rat-tailed" type.
