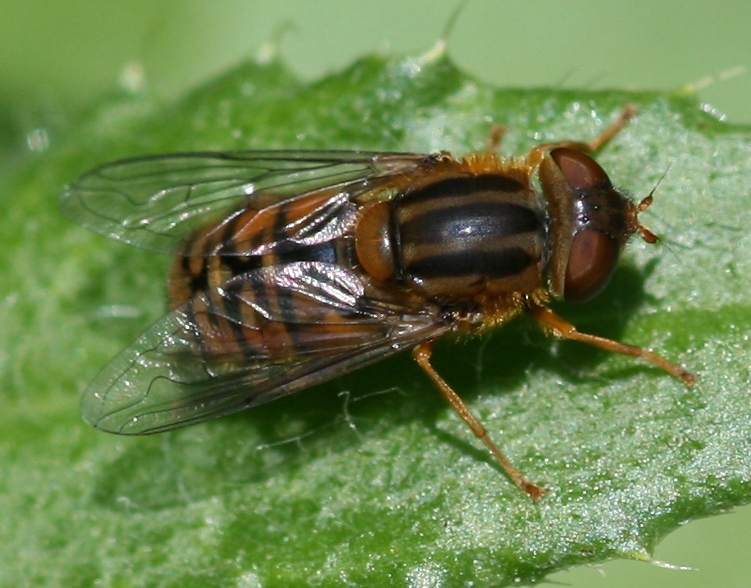

Scientific classification
- Kingdom: Animalia
- Phylum: Arthropoda
- Class: Insecta
- Order: Diptera
- Family: Syrphidae
- Genus: Parhelophilus
- Species: P. versicolor

Binomial name
- Parhelophilus versicolor Fabricius, 1787

= Parhelophilus versicolor =

Species of fly

Parhelophilus versicolor is a European hoverfly.

== Description ==
External images For terms see Morphology of Diptera
Wing length is 7–9 mm. There is no posteroventral tubercle at base of Femur 3. Face is convex. Occiput has yellow hairs only. Reemer (2000) figures the male genitalia. The larva is figured by Hartley (1961) See references for determination.

== Distribution ==
Palearctic Southern Fennoscandia South to Iberia and the Mediterranean basin. Ireland East through Europe into Turkey and European Russia then to western Siberia.

== Biology ==
Habitat: Wetland. Fen, marsh and reed beds. Flowers visited include white umbellifers, Aegopodium podagraria, Cardamine, Cistus, Crataegus, Euphorbia, Filipendula ulmaria, Galium, Leontodon, Sorbus aucuparia. Flies May to August. The larva is aquatic. It has been collected from decaying rhizomes of Typha.
