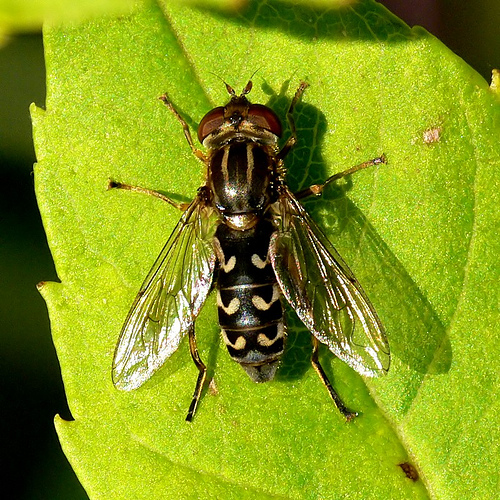

Scientific classification
- Kingdom: Animalia
- Phylum: Arthropoda
- Class: Insecta
- Order: Diptera
- Family: Syrphidae
- Genus: Anasimyia
- Species: A. contracta

Binomial name
- Anasimyia contracta Claussen & Torp, 1980

= Anasimyia contracta =

Species of fly

Anasimyia contracta is a European species of hoverfly.

== Description ==
The wing length 5 to 7.5 mm. Tergite 2 is narrower than it is long and it has greyish 'hockey stick' shaped markings. A. transfuga has similar markings but with tergite 2 parallel sided and wider than long.

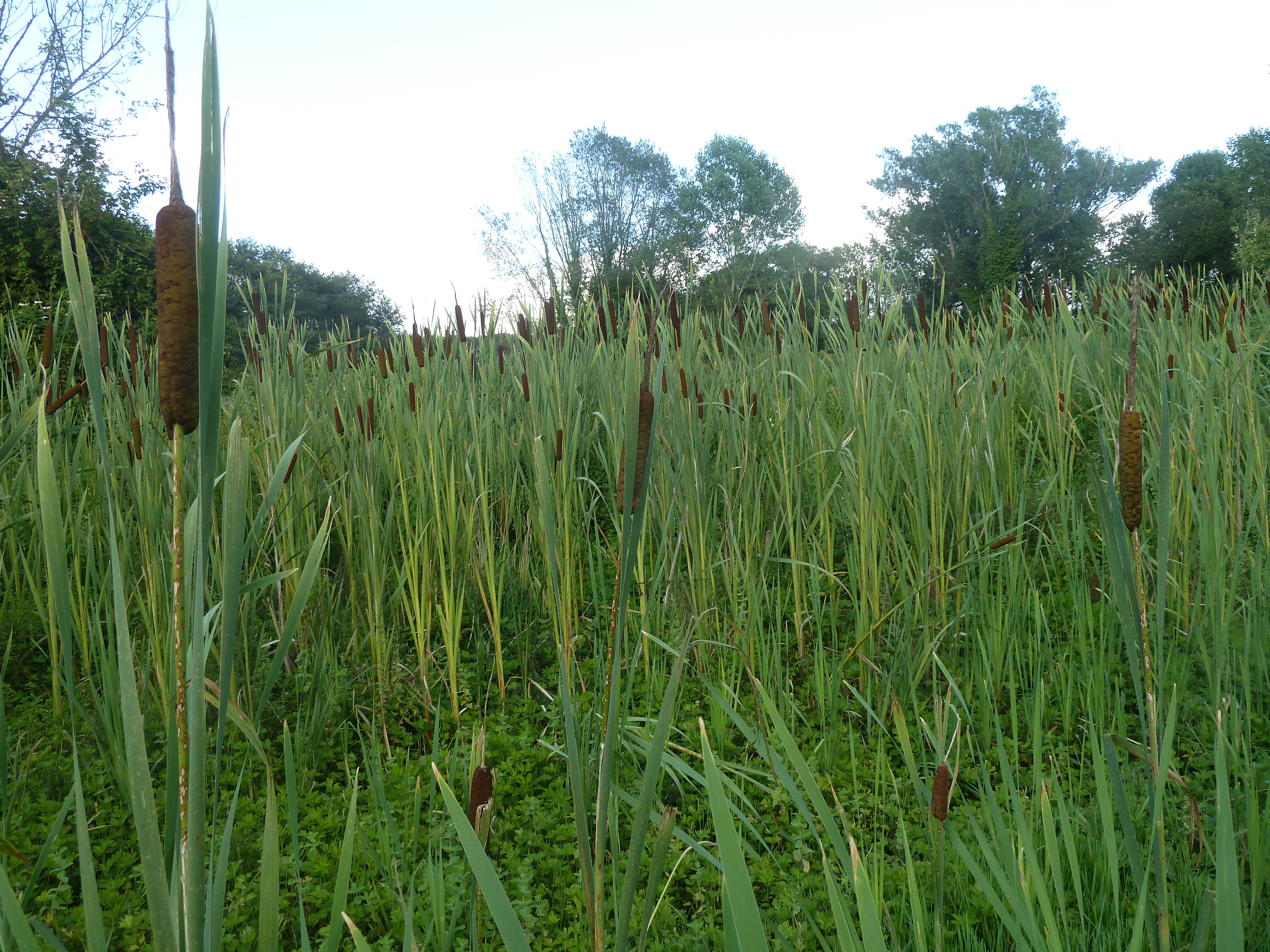
Habitat.Italy

== Habits ==
A wetland species found near ponds with Typha, especially in fens. Flowers visited include white umbellifers, Menyanthes, Ranunculus, Myosotis, Potentilla palustris, Sorbus aucuparia and Potentilla palustris The larva has been found among debris of dead Typha stalks beneath the water surface.

== Distribution ==
West Palearctic Ireland eastwards through central Europe to European Russia.
