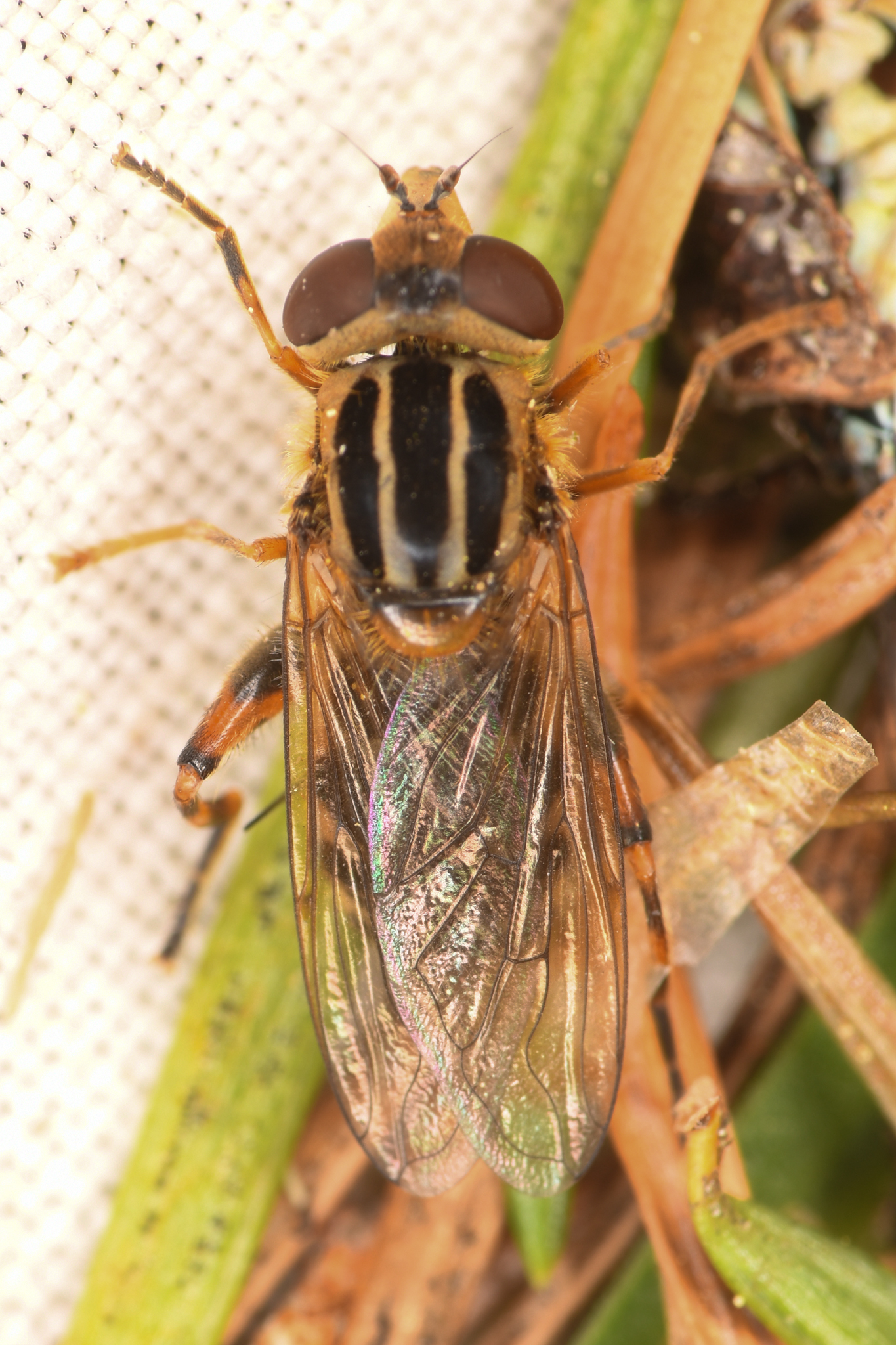

Scientific classification
- Kingdom: Animalia
- Phylum: Arthropoda
- Class: Insecta
- Order: Diptera
- Family: Syrphidae
- Genus: Eurimyia
- Species: E. stipata

Binomial name
- Eurimyia stipata (Walker, 1849)

Synonyms
- Helophilus stipatus Walker 1849; Helophilus anausis Walker 1849; Helophilus conostoma Williston 1886

= Eurimyia stipata =

Species of fly

Eurimyia stipata, the long-nosed swamp fly, is a species of syrphid fly observed across northern North America. Syrphid flies are also known as Hover Flies or Flower Flies because the adults are frequently found hovering around flowers from which they feed on nectar and pollen. Adults are 11.7–17.1 mm (0.46–0.67 in) long with a striped scutum and sawtooth yellow abdominal spots . Larvae of this genus are aquatic.
