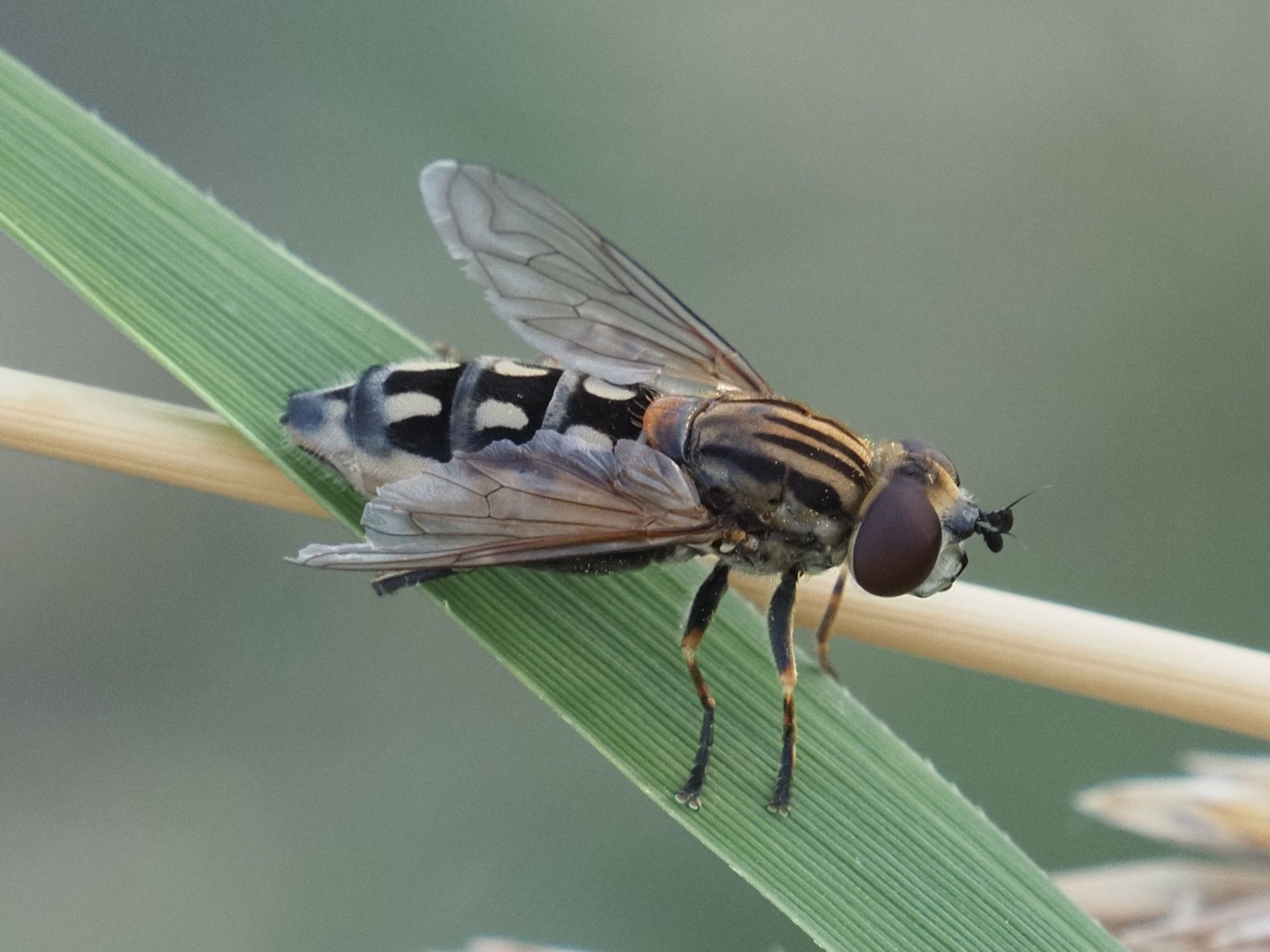
- Lejops vittatus, Austria

Scientific classification
- Kingdom: Animalia
- Phylum: Arthropoda
- Class: Insecta
- Order: Diptera
- Family: Syrphidae
- Subfamily: Eristalinae
- Tribe: Eristalini
- Subtribe: Helophilina
- Genus: Lejops; Rondani, 1857

Type species
- Mallota vittata Meiden, 1822

Synonyms
- Liops Verrall, 1882

= Lejops =

Genus of flies

Lejops is a genus of hoverflies, closely related to the genera Helophilus, Quichuana and Mallota.

This genus formerly contained the following subgenera which have been elevated to genus level: Anasimyia, Eurimyia, Asemosyrphus, Lunomyia, Polydontomyia, and Arctosyrphus. The species of these genera are sometimes treated as species of Lejops.

== Species ==
These three species are members of the genus Lejops.

- Lejops barbiellinii (Ceresa, 1934) - Brazil
- Lejops pilosus (Hunter, 1897)
- Lejops vittatus (Meigen, 1822) - Europe and Asia
