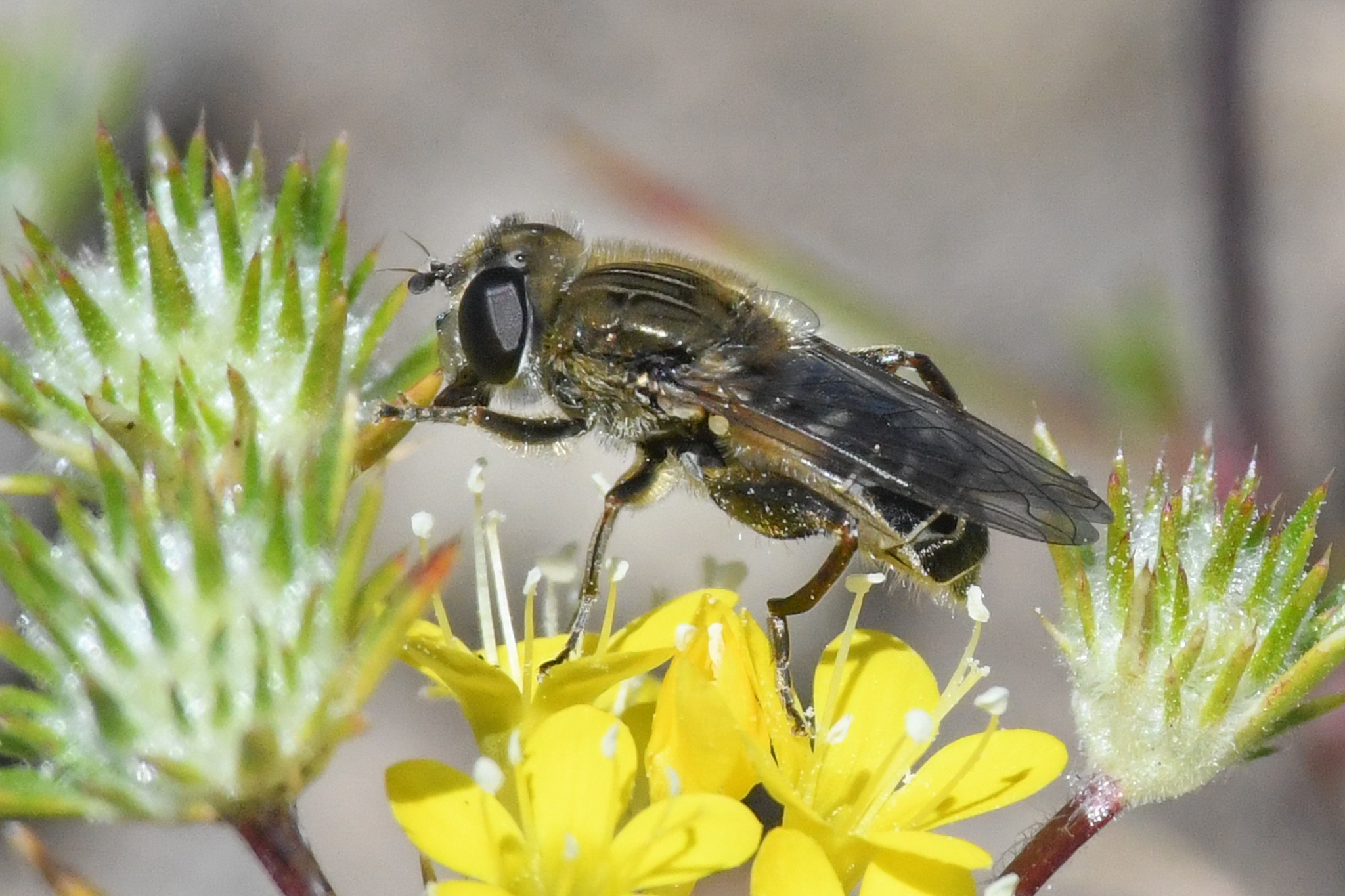
- Asemosyrphus polygrammus, common sickleleg, California

Scientific classification
- Domain: Eukaryota
- Kingdom: Animalia
- Phylum: Arthropoda
- Class: Insecta
- Order: Diptera
- Family: Syrphidae
- Subfamily: Eristalinae
- Tribe: Eristalini
- Subtribe: Helophilina
- Genus: Asemosyrphus; Bigot, 1882

= Asemosyrphus =

Genus of flies

Asemosyrphus is a genus of rat-tail maggot flies in the family Syrphidae. There are three described species in Asemosyrphus. They were formerly members of the genus Lejops.

== Species ==
These three species belong to the genus Asemosyrphus:

- Asemosyrphus arquatus (Say, 1829)
- Asemosyrphus mexicanus (Macquart, 1842) (southern sickleleg)
- Asemosyrphus polygrammus (Loew, 1872) (common sickleleg)
