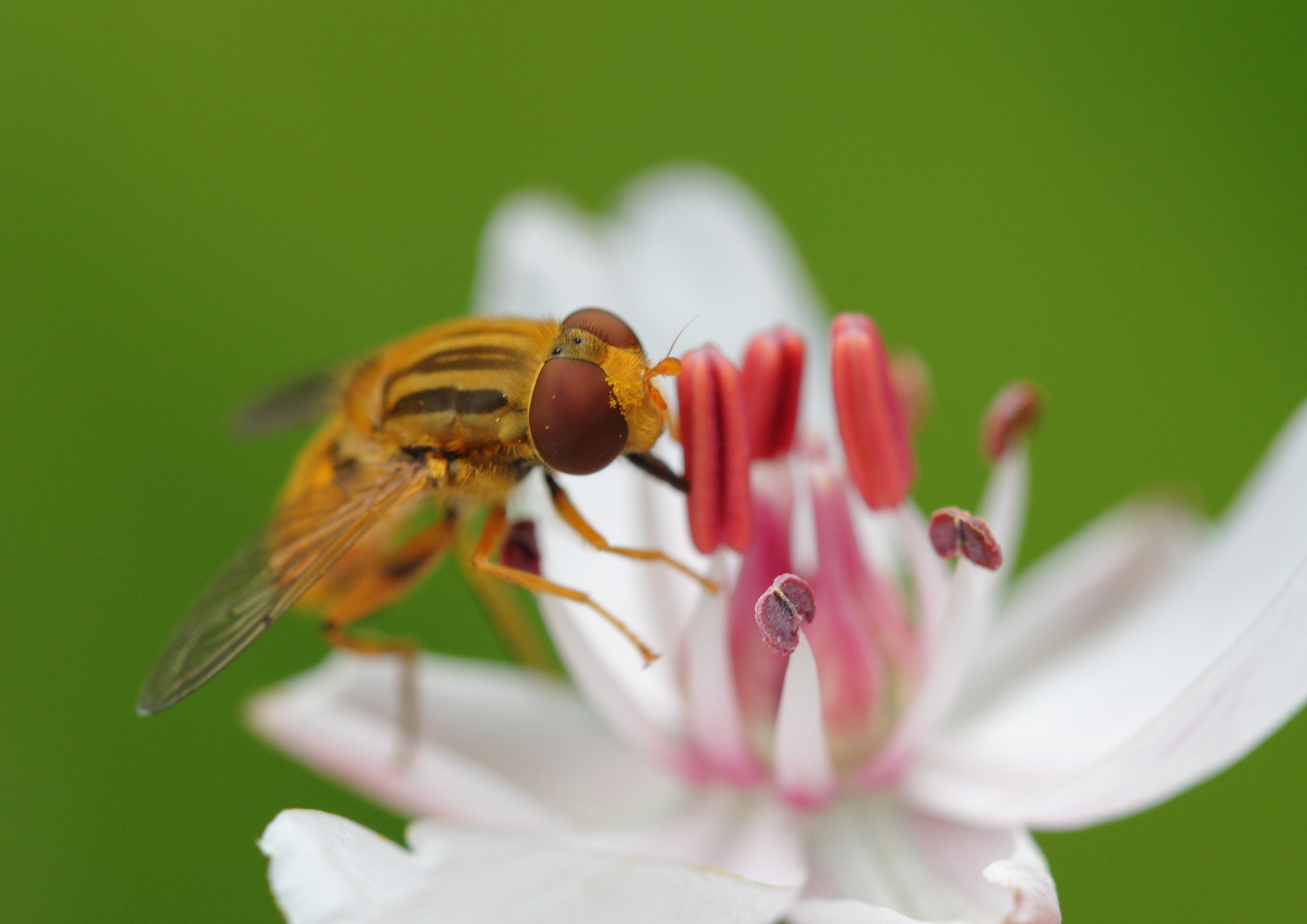

Scientific classification
- Kingdom: Animalia
- Phylum: Arthropoda
- Class: Insecta
- Order: Diptera
- Family: Syrphidae
- Genus: Parhelophilus
- Species: P. frutetorum

Binomial name
- Parhelophilus frutetorum (Fabricius, 1775)

= Parhelophilus frutetorum =

Species of fly

Parhelophilus frutetorum is a European hoverfly.
