= Lunomyia =

Scientific classification
- Domain: Eukaryota
- Kingdom: Animalia
- Phylum: Arthropoda
- Class: Insecta
- Order: Diptera
- Family: Syrphidae
- Subfamily: Eristalinae
- Tribe: Eristalini
- Subtribe: Helophilina
- Genus: Lunomyia; Curran & Fluke, 1926
- Species: L. cooleyi

Binomial name
- Lunomyia cooleyi (Seamans, 1917)

Genus of flies

Lunomyia is a genus of rat-tail maggot flies in the family Syrphidae. This genus has a single species, Lunomyia cooleyi. It was formerly a member of the genus Lejops.
