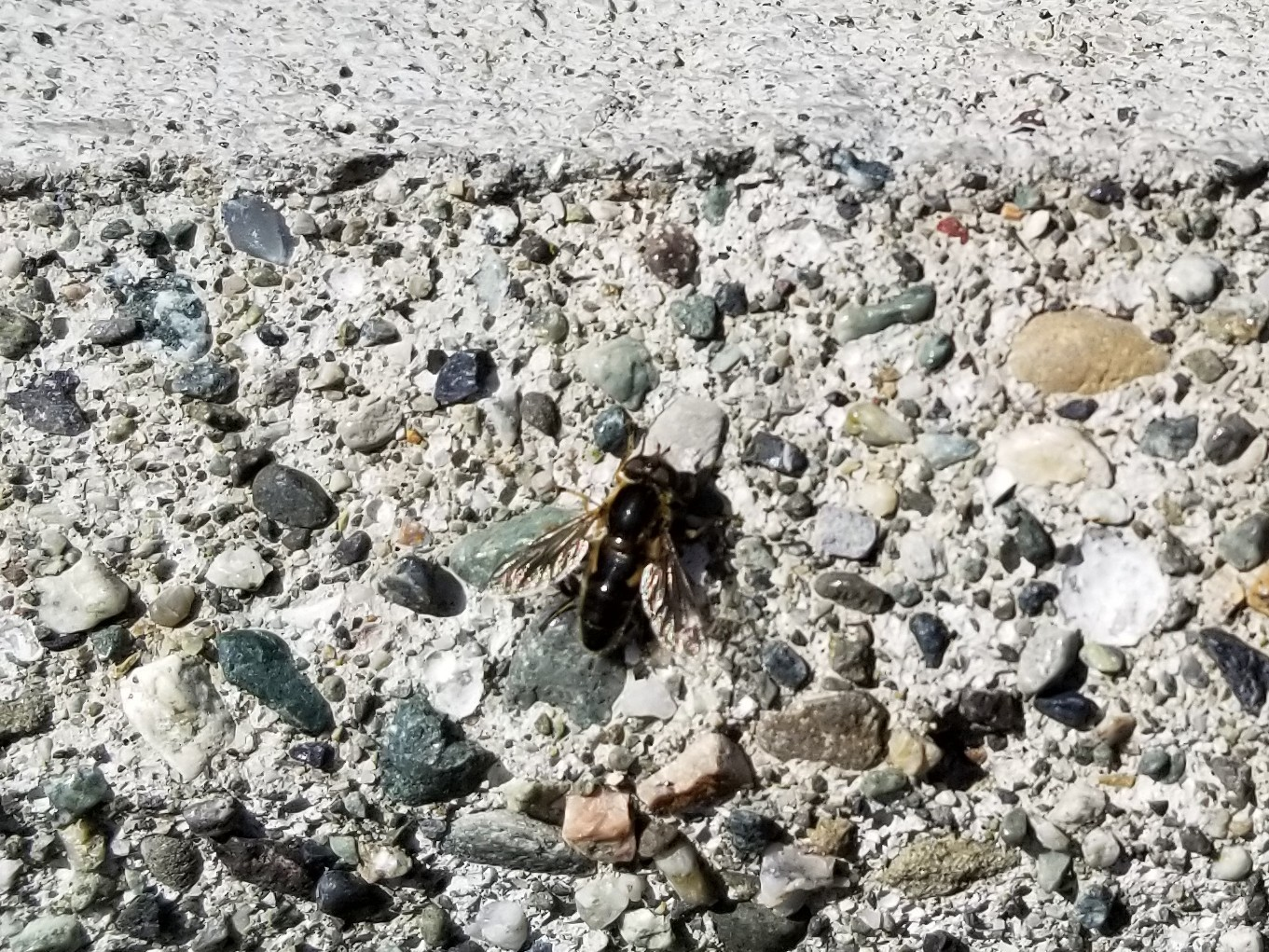
- Anasimyia perfidiosus, Anchorage, Alaska

Scientific classification
- Domain: Eukaryota
- Kingdom: Animalia
- Phylum: Arthropoda
- Class: Insecta
- Order: Diptera
- Family: Syrphidae
- Genus: Anasimyia
- Species: A. perfidiosus

Binomial name
- Anasimyia perfidiosus (Hunter, 1897)

Synonyms
- Lejops perfidiosus (Hunter, 1897); Pterallastes perfidiosus Hunter, 1897

= Anasimyia perfidiosus =

Species of fly

Anasimyia perfidiosus is a species of syrphid fly in the family Syrphidae, found in North America.

This species was formerly a member of the genus Lejops, and is sometimes called Lejops perfidiosus.
