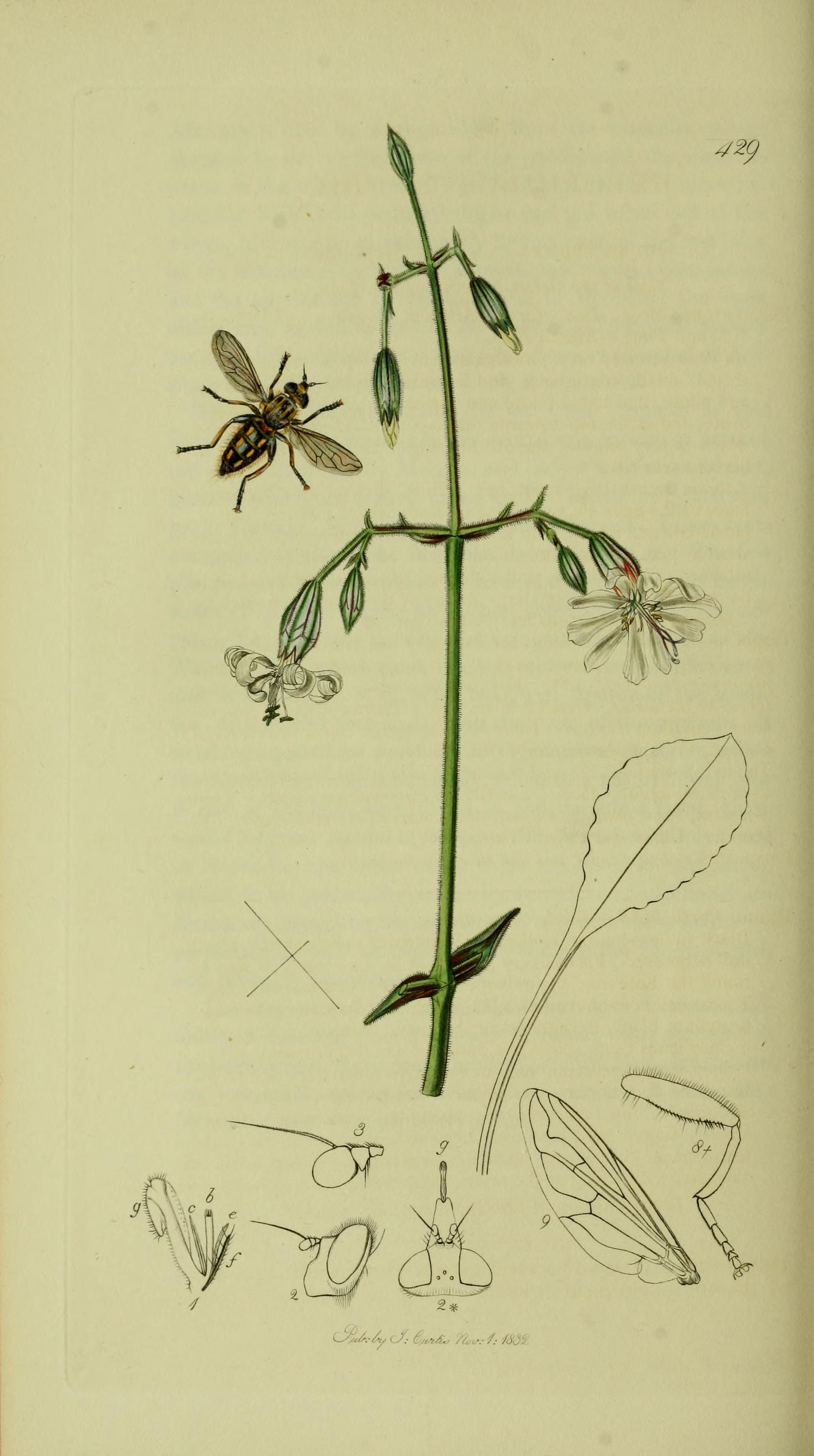

Scientific classification
- Kingdom: Animalia
- Phylum: Arthropoda
- Class: Insecta
- Order: Diptera
- Family: Syrphidae
- Genus: Lejops
- Species: L. vittatus

Binomial name
- Lejops vittatus (Meigen, 1822)

= Lejops vittatus =

Species of fly

Lejops vittatus is a European species of hoverfly.
