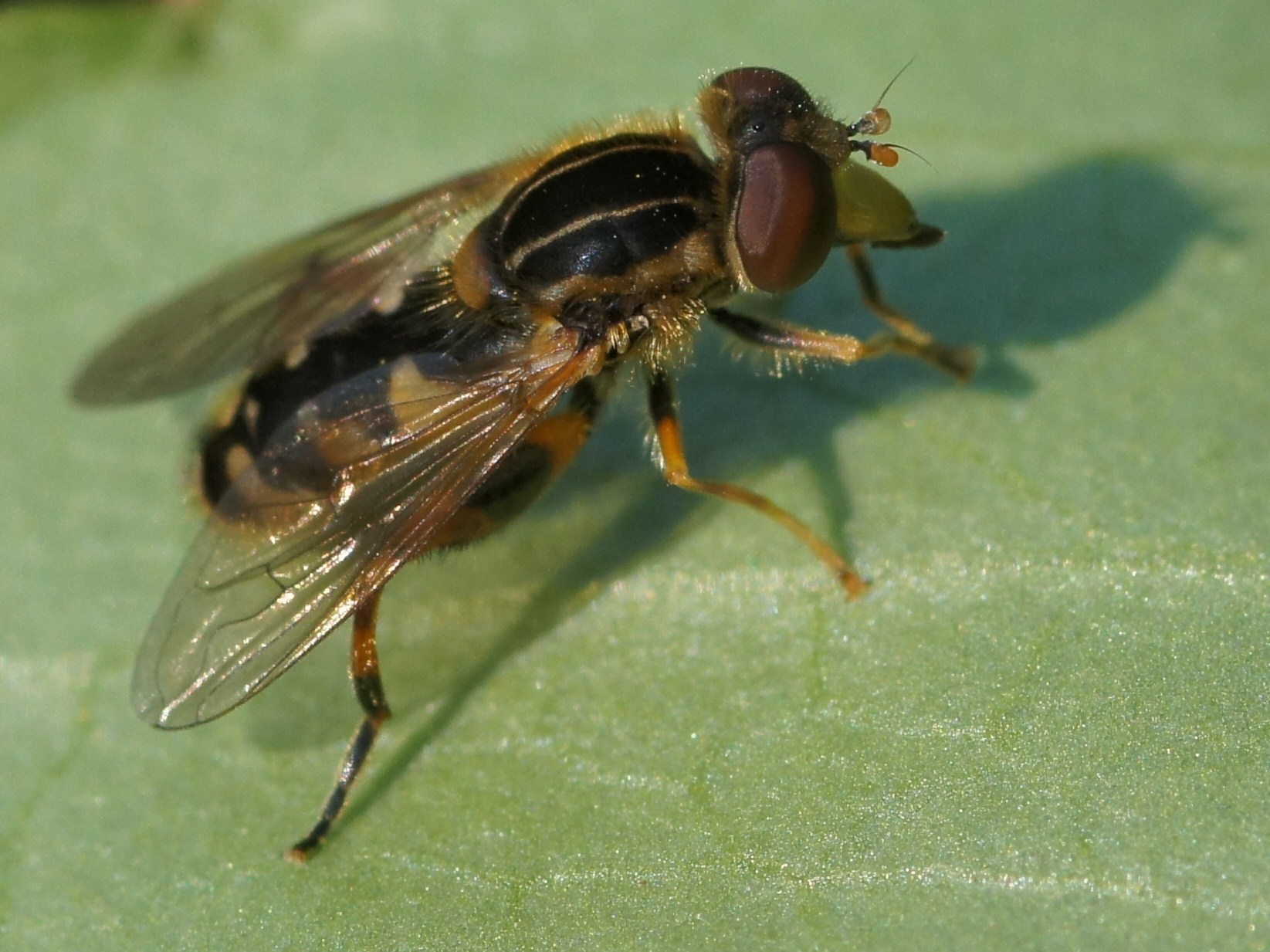
- Anasimyia lineata female

Scientific classification
- Kingdom: Animalia
- Phylum: Arthropoda
- Class: Insecta
- Order: Diptera
- Family: Syrphidae
- Genus: Anasimyia
- Species: A. lineata

Binomial name
- Anasimyia lineata (Fabricius, 1787)

= Anasimyia lineata =

Species of fly

Anasimyia lineata is a Palaearctic species of hoverfly.

== Description ==
External images The face protrudes forwards as a long snout which tapers to a point. The body has dark ground colour. The male has triangular orange markings on the tergites (especially on tergite 2). Female markings are orange or grey. The stigma is in the form of a dark patch between the veins.

Keys and accounts

- Coe R.L. (1953) Syrphidae
- Van Veen, M. (2004) Hoverflies of Northwest Europe
- Van der Goot, V.S. (1981) De zweefvliegen van Noordwest - Europa en Europees Rusland, in het bijzonder van de Benelux
- Bei-Bienko, G.Y. & Steyskal, G.C. (1988) Keys to USSR insects. Diptera

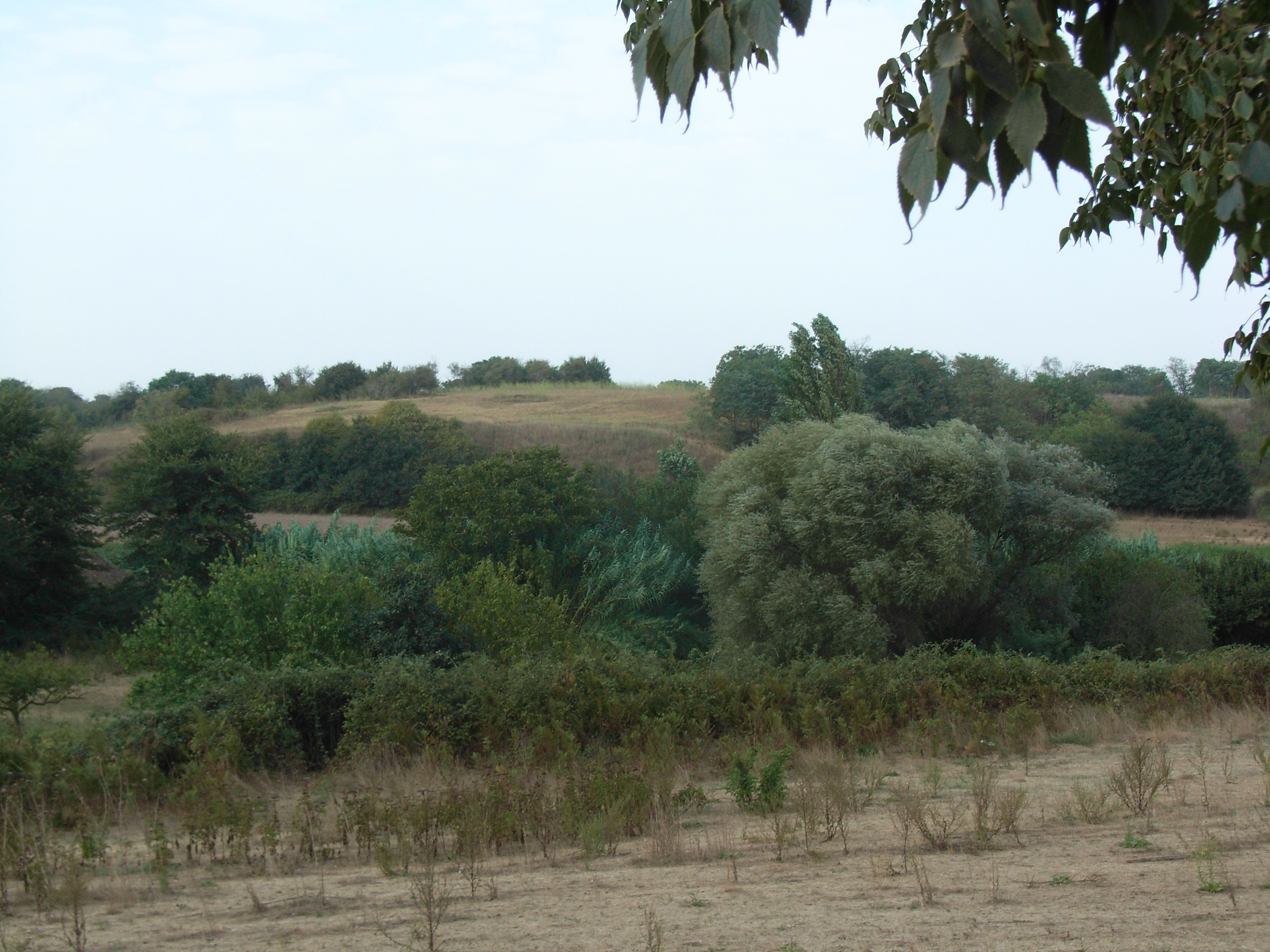
Habitat.Italy

== Habits ==
Wetlands including bog, fen and marsh, pond-side and riverine fen and alluvial wetlands, such as oxbow lakes. Flowers visited include Alisma plantago-aquatica, Caltha, Cardamine pratense, Cicuta viros, Lythrum salicaria, Menyanthes trifoliata, Nymphaea alba, Potentilla anserina, Ranunculus, Lychnis flos-cuculi, Sorbus aucuparia, Crataegus and Anthriscus sylvestris. The larva is aquatic and microphagous in rotting plant debris. It is illustrated by Rotheray (1993)

== Distribution ==
Entire temperate Palearctic.
