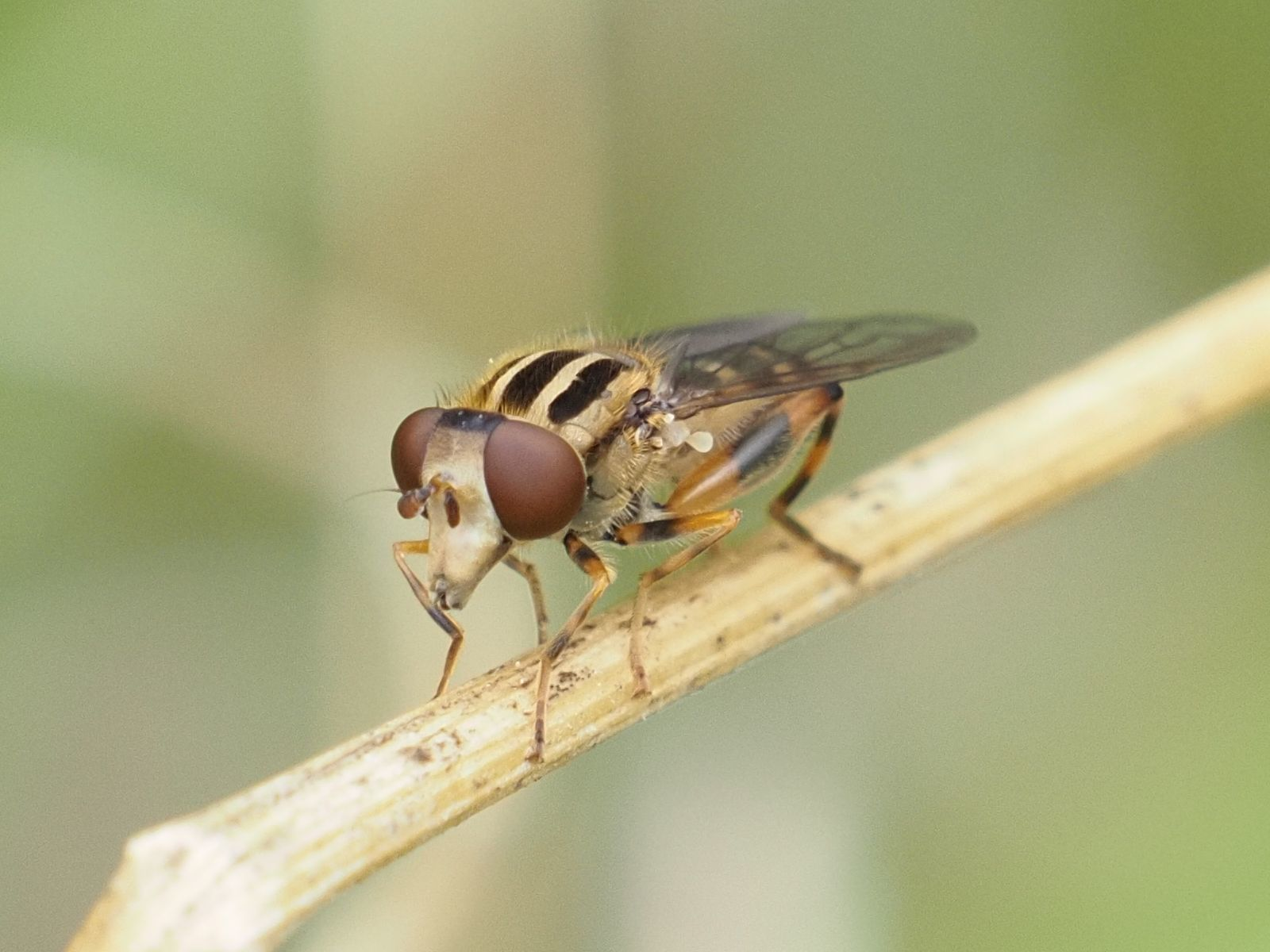
- Eurimyia lineata, striped swamp fly, Austria

Scientific classification
- Domain: Eukaryota
- Kingdom: Animalia
- Phylum: Arthropoda
- Class: Insecta
- Order: Diptera
- Family: Syrphidae
- Subfamily: Eristalinae
- Tribe: Eristalini
- Subtribe: Helophilina
- Genus: Eurimyia; Bigot, 1883

= Eurimyia =

Genus of flies

Eurimyia is a genus of rat-tail maggot flies in the family Syrphidae. There are three described species in Eurimyia. They were formerly members of the genus Lejops.

== Species ==
- Eurimyia japonica (Shiraki, 1930)
- Eurimyia lineata (Fabricius, 1787) (striped swamp fly)
- Eurimyia stipata (Walker, 1849) (long-nosed swamp fly)
