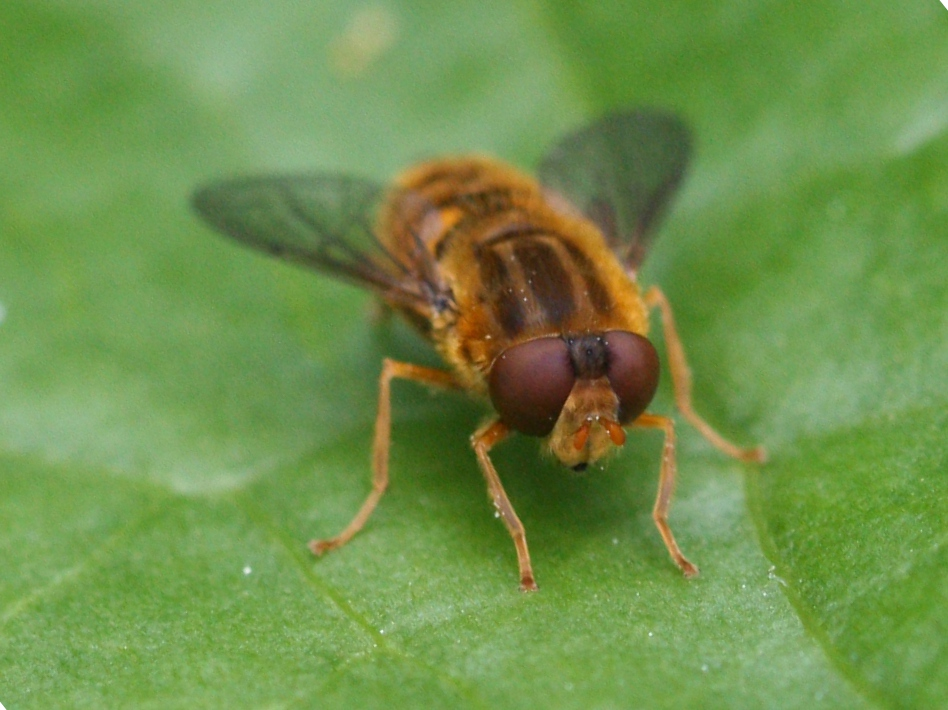
- Parhelophilus species (male)

Scientific classification
- Kingdom: Animalia
- Phylum: Arthropoda
- Class: Insecta
- Order: Diptera
- Family: Syrphidae
- Subfamily: Eristalinae
- Tribe: Eristalini
- Subtribe: Helophilina
- Genus: Parhelophilus; Girschner, 1897

= Parhelophilus =

Genus of flies

Parhelophilus is a genus of hoverflies. They are slightly smaller than flies of the genus Helophilus, and have a Holarctic distribution.

== Species ==
- P. almasyi Szilády, 1940
- P. brooksi Curran, 1927
- P. consimilis (Malm, 1863)
- P. crococoronatus Reemer, 2000
- P. currani Fluke, 1953
- P. divisus (Loew, 1863)
- P. flavifacies (Bigot, 1883)
- P. frutetorum (Fabricius, 1775)
- P. integer (Loew, 1963)
- P. kurentzovi Violovich, 1960
- P. laetus (Loew, 1963)
- P. obscurior Violovich, 1960
- P. obsoletus (Loew, 1863)
- P. porcus (Walker, 1849)
- P. rex Curran and Fluke, 1922
- P. sibiricus (Stackelberg, 1924)
- P. versicolor (Fabricius, 1794)
