= Dolichogyna =

Scientific classification
- Kingdom: Animalia
- Phylum: Arthropoda
- Class: Insecta
- Order: Diptera
- Family: Syrphidae
- Subfamily: Eristalinae
- Tribe: Eristalini
- Subtribe: Helophilina
- Genus: Dolichogyna; Macquart, 1842

Type species
- Dolichogyna chiliensis Guerin-Meneville, 1835

Genus of flies

Dolichogyna is a genus of hoverflies.

== Species ==
- Dolichogyna abrupta Hine, 1914
- Dolichogyna boliviana Lagrange, 1993
- Dolichogyna chilensis (Guerin-Meneville, 1835)
- Dolichogyna chiliensis (Guérin, 1835)
- Dolichogyna hinei Fluke, 1951
- Dolichogyna minotaurus (Speiser, 1914)
- Dolichogyna mulleri Fluke, 1951
- Dolichogyna nigripes Bigot, 1884
- Dolichogyna pennipes (Sack, 1941)
- Dolichogyna peruana Sack, 1941
- Dolichogyna peruviensis Lagrange, 1993
- Dolichogyna picta (Philippi, 1865)
- Dolichogyna reynoldsi Shanno' & Aubertin, 1933
- Dolichogyna rostrata (Macquart, 1846)

from gbif
