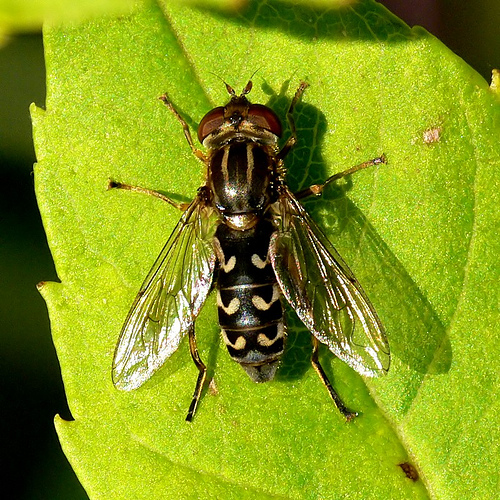
- Anasimyia contracta

Scientific classification
- Domain: Eukaryota
- Kingdom: Animalia
- Phylum: Arthropoda
- Class: Insecta
- Order: Diptera
- Family: Syrphidae
- Subfamily: Eristalinae
- Tribe: Eristalini
- Subtribe: Helophilina
- Genus: Anasimyia; Schiner, 1864

= Anasimyia =

Genus of flies

Anasimyia is a genus of wetland hoverflies with aquatic larvae. The genus was formerly regarded as a subgenus of the similar Lejops, and recently elevated to genus.

== Species ==
- Anasimyia anausis (moon-shaped swamp fly)
- Anasimyia annulipes (Macquart, 1850)
- Anasimyia bilinearis (Williston, 1887) (two-lined swamp fly)
- Anasimyia borealis (Cole, 1921)
- Anasimyia chrysostoma (Wiedemann, 1830) (lump-legged swamp fly)
- Anasimyia contracta Claussen & Torp, 1980
- Anasimyia diffusa Locke, Skevington & Vockeroth, 2019 (smooth-legged swamp fly)
- Anasimyia distincta (Williston, 1887) (short-spurred swamp fly)
- Anasimyia femorata Simic, 1987
- Anasimyia grisescens (Hull 1943) (long-spurred swamp fly)
- Anasimyia interpuncta (Harris, 1776)
- Anasimyia inundata (Violovitsh, 1979)
- Anasimyia japonica (Shiraki, 1930)
- Anasimyia lineata (Fabricius, 1787)
- Anasimyia lunulata (Meigen, 1822)
- Anasimyia matutina Locke, Skevington & Vockeroth, 2019 (small-spotted swamp fly)
- Anasimyia perfidiosus (Hunter, 1897) (treacherous swamp fly)
- Anasimyia smirnovi (Stackelberg, 1924)
- Anasimyia subtransfugus (Stackelberg, 1963)
- Anasimyia transfuga (Linnaeus, 1758)

== Gallery ==
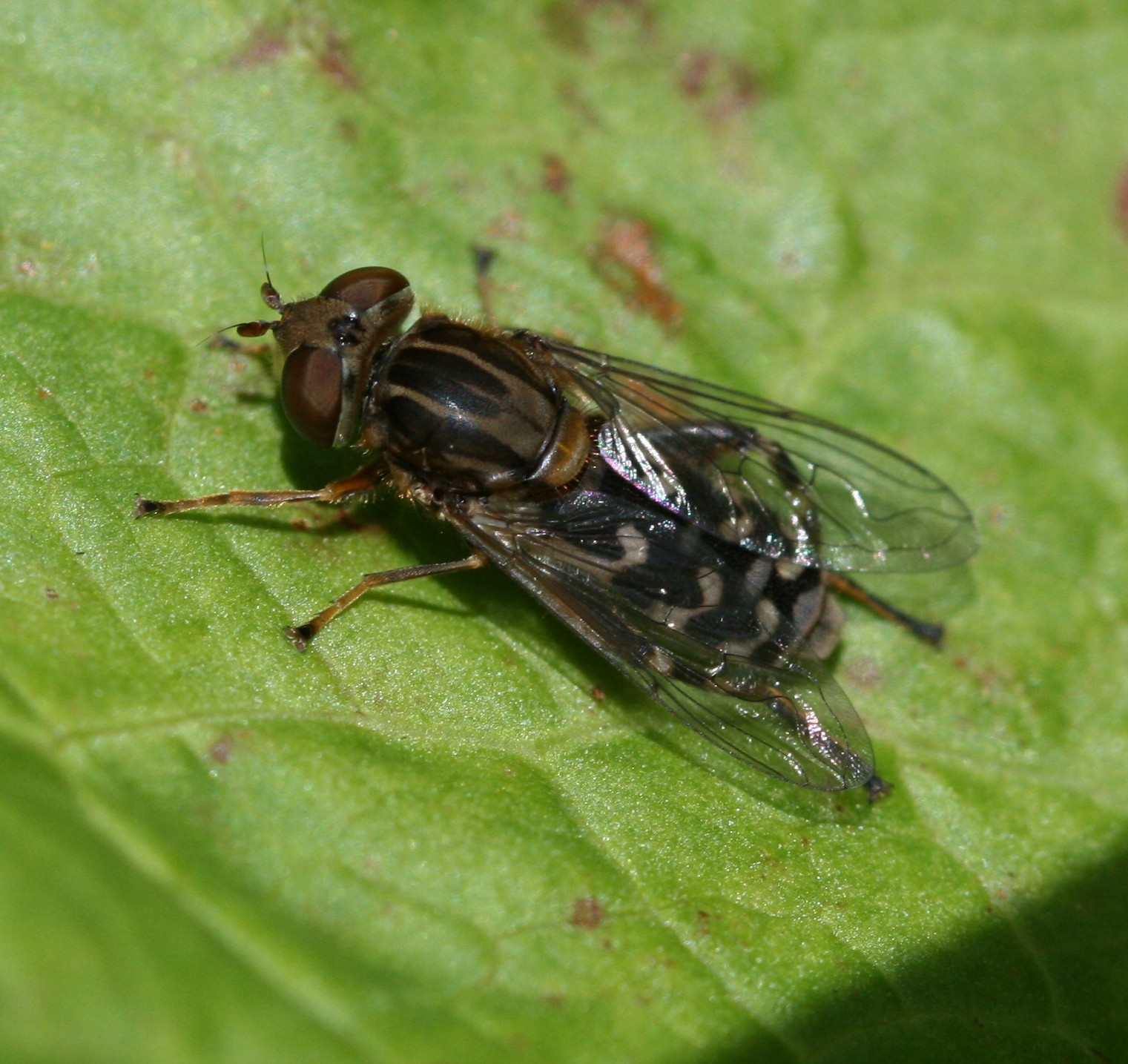
Anasimyia contracta

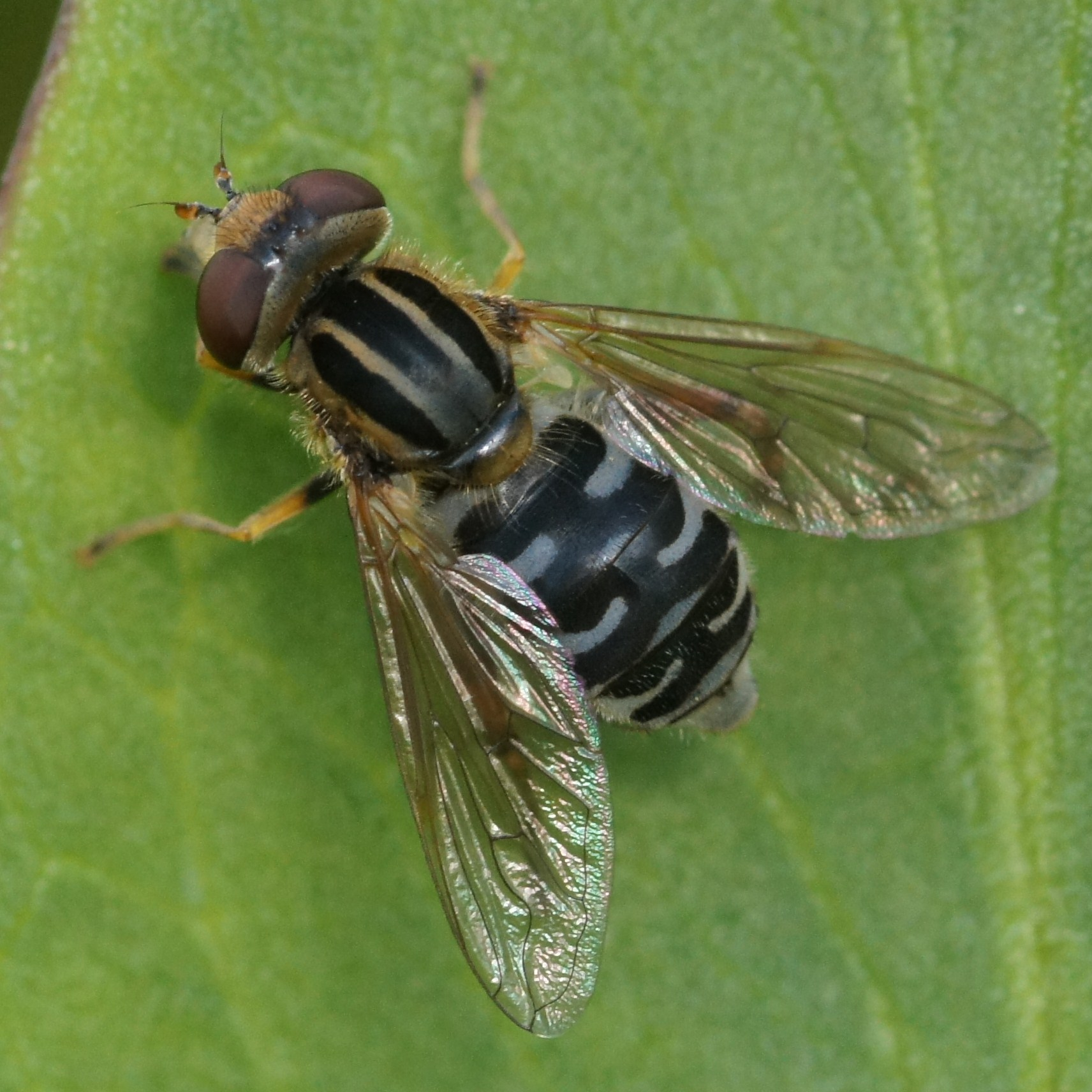
Anasimyia interpuncta

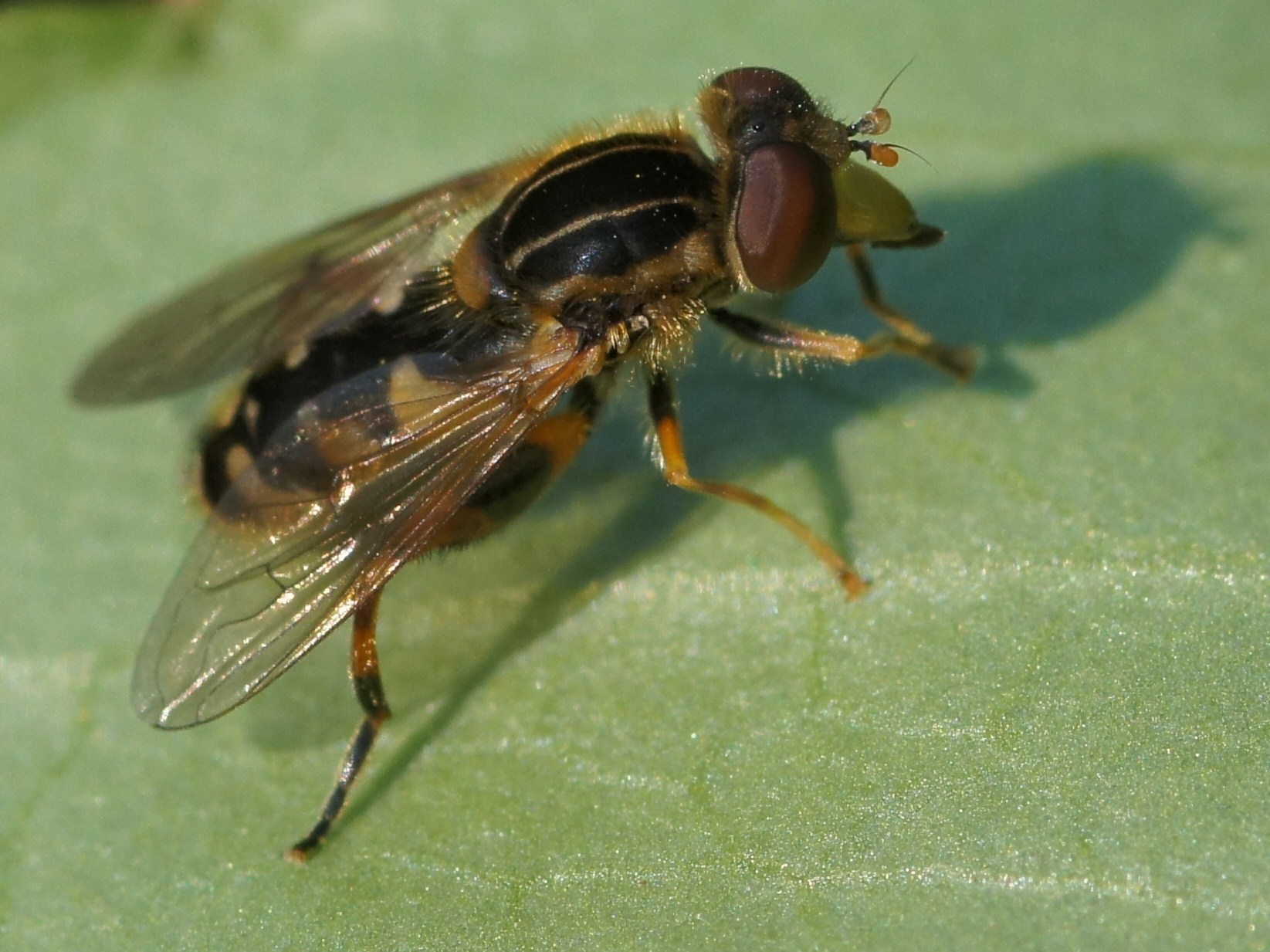
Anasimyia lineata
