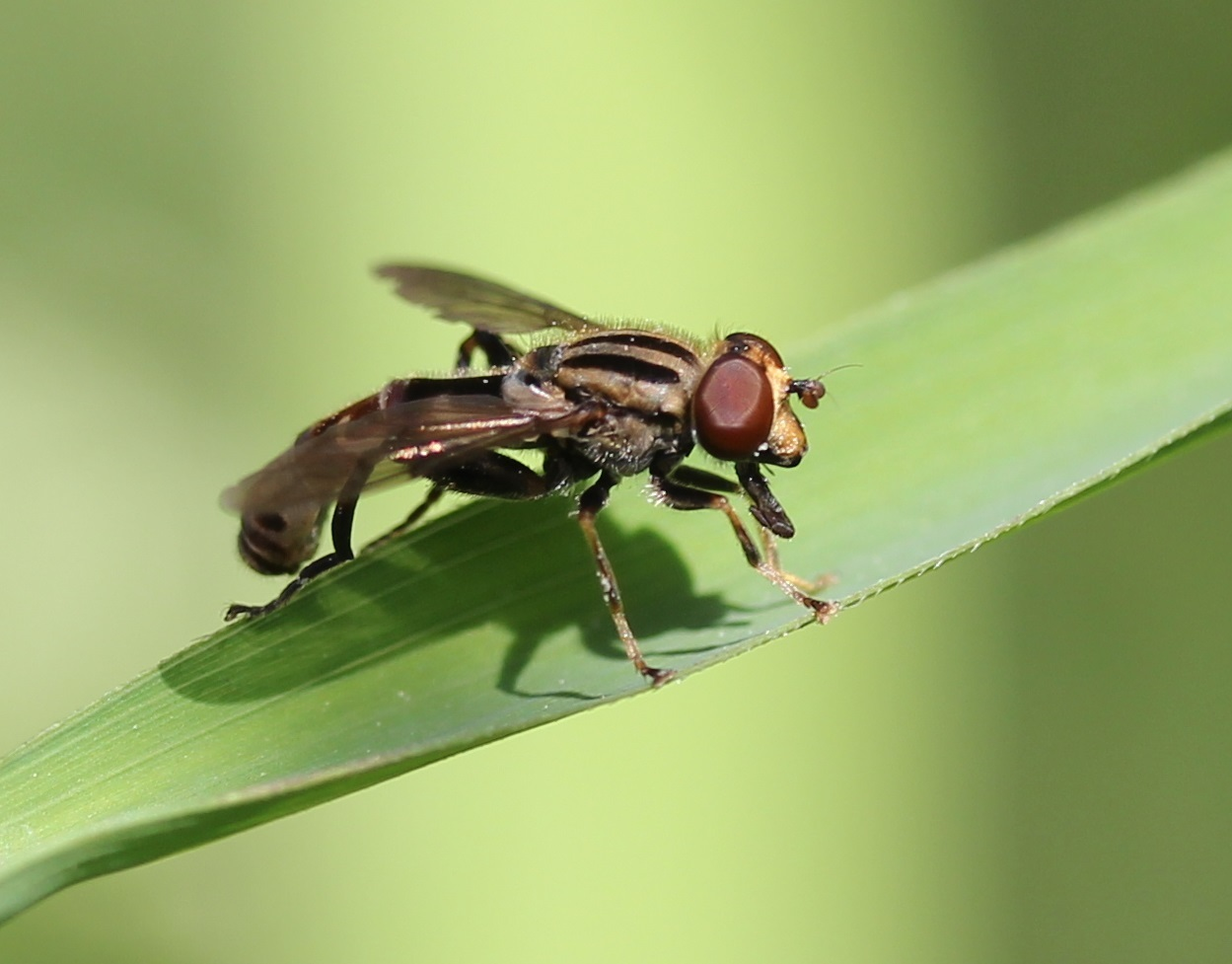

Scientific classification
- Domain: Eukaryota
- Kingdom: Animalia
- Phylum: Arthropoda
- Class: Insecta
- Order: Diptera
- Family: Syrphidae
- Genus: Anasimyia
- Species: A. distincta

Binomial name
- Anasimyia distincta (Williston 1887)

Synonyms
- Lejops distinctus (Williston 1887); Helophilus distinctus (Williston 1887)

= Anasimyia distincta =

Species of insect

Anasimyia distincta, the short-spurred swamp fly, is a rare species of syrphid fly observed in The Northeastern United States and adjacent Canada. Hoverflies can remain nearly motionless in flight. The adults are also known as flower flies for they are commonly found on flowers from which they get both energy-giving nectar and protein rich pollen. Larvae of this genus are of the rat-tailed type living in aquatic environments.
