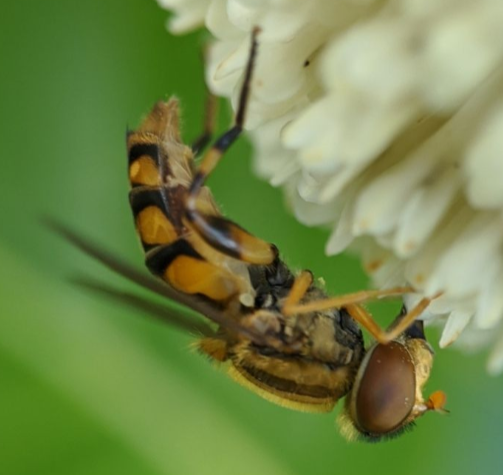

Scientific classification
- Kingdom: Animalia
- Phylum: Arthropoda
- Class: Insecta
- Order: Diptera
- Family: Syrphidae
- Genus: Parhelophilus
- Species: P. integer

Binomial name
- Parhelophilus integer (Loew, 1963)

= Parhelophilus integer =

Species of fly

Parhelophilus integer , the shiny bog fly, is a rare species of syrphid fly observed in the Eastern United States. Hoverflies can remain nearly motionless in flight. The adults are also known as flower flies, for they are commonly found on flowers from which they get both energy-giving nectar and protein-rich pollen. The larvae of this genus are the long tailed "rat-tailed" type.
