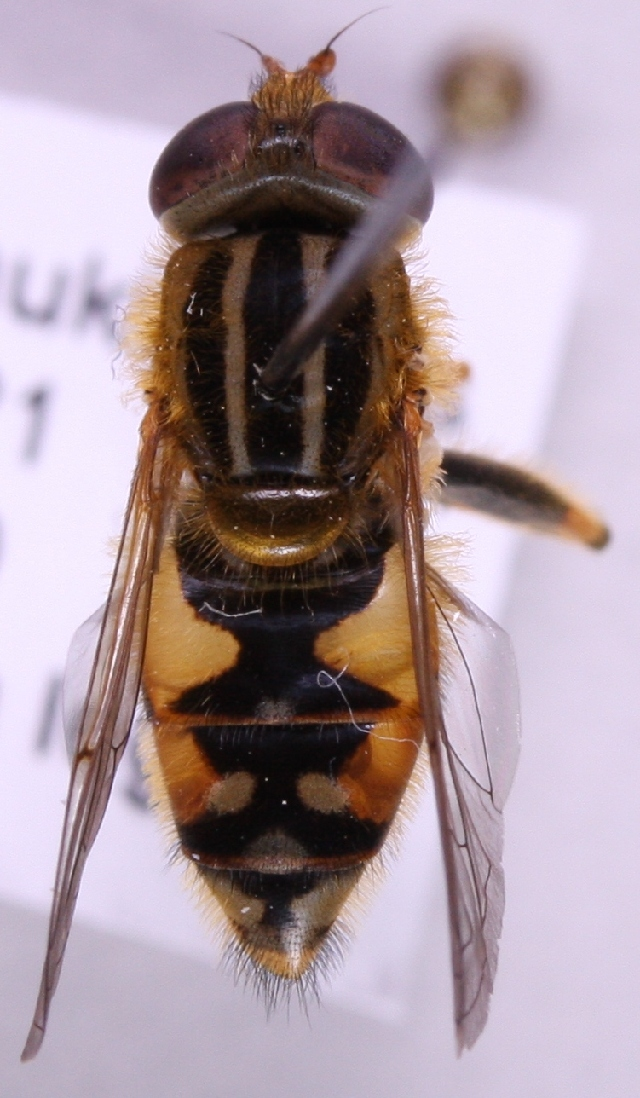

Scientific classification
- Kingdom: Animalia
- Phylum: Arthropoda
- Class: Insecta
- Order: Diptera
- Family: Syrphidae
- Genus: Parhelophilus
- Species: P. consimilis

Binomial name
- Parhelophilus consimilis (Malm, 1863)

= Parhelophilus consimilis =

Species of fly

Parhelophilus consimilis is a Palearctic hoverfly.

== Description ==
External images For terms see Morphology of Diptera
Wing length 7 ·5-8 ·5 mm Apical 1/4 of front tibiae black. Tergite 1 with 2 diagonal dust bands. Face in lateral view protruding beyond frons. Reemer (2000) figures the male genitalia. See references for determination.

== Distribution ==
Palearctic Fennoscandia South to Belgium and North France. Ireland East through Britain, Denmark, Poland and North Europe and Russia to eastern Siberia.

== Biology ==
Habitat: Wetland. Fen, transition mire, bog, raised bog and cut-over bog. Flowers visited include white umbellifers, Bidens cernua, Menyanthes, Potentilla palustris, Ranunculus. Flies mid June to beginning August.
