= Habromyia =

Scientific classification
- Kingdom: Animalia
- Phylum: Arthropoda
- Class: Insecta
- Order: Diptera
- Family: Syrphidae
- Subfamily: Eristalinae
- Tribe: Eristalini
- Subtribe: Helophilina
- Genus: Habromyia; Williston, 1888

Type species
- Habromyia coeruleithorax Williston, 1888

Synonyms
- Edwardsietta Hull; Lycopale Hull; Criothrix Hull

Genus of flies

Habromyia is a genus of around 3 Neotropical hoverflies.

== Species ==
- H. coeruleithorax Williston, 1888
- H. ochracea Hull, 1941
- H. langi Curran, 1934
