= Quichuana =

Scientific classification
- Kingdom: Animalia
- Phylum: Arthropoda
- Class: Insecta
- Order: Diptera
- Family: Syrphidae
- Subfamily: Eristalinae
- Tribe: Eristalini
- Subtribe: Helophilina
- Genus: Quichuana; Knabb, 1913

Genus of flies

Quichuana is a genus of hoverflies.

== Species ==
- Quichuana amazonica Ricarte & Hancock, 2012
- Quichuana angustiventris (Macquart, 1855)
- Quichuana argentea Ricarte, 2012
- Quichuana atra Ricarte & Marcos-García, 2012
- Quichuana bezzii Ceresa, 1934
- Quichuana boliviana Ricarte & Rotheray, 2012
- Quichuana borgmeieri Lane & Carrera, 1944
- Quichuana brevicera Shannon
- Quichuana bromeliarum (Ricarte & Marcos-García, 2012)
- Quichuana calathea Shannon, 1925
- Quichuana cestus Hull, 1946
- Quichuana cincta (Bigot, 1884)
- Quichuana citara Montoya & Wolff, 2017
- Quichuana communis Ricarte & Rotheray, 2012
- Quichuana dissimilis Ricarte & Rotheray, 2012
- Quichuana dolorosa Hull, 1946
- Quichuana dominica Thompson, 1981
- Quichuana fasciata (Sack, 1941)
- Quichuana hermosa Hull, 1951
- Quichuana hulli Ricarte & Marcos-García, 2012
- Quichuana inbio Ricarte & Marcos-García, 2012
- Quichuana inca Shannon, 1925
- Quichuana invenusta Ricarte, 2012
- Quichuana knabi Shannon, 1927
- Quichuana longicauda Ricarte & Hancock, 2012
- Quichuana mariliae Ricarte & Hancock, 2012
- Quichuana melas Ricarte & Marcos-García, 2012
- Quichuana montana Hull, 1951
- Quichuana mozotalensis Ricarte & Marcos-García, 2012
- Quichuana nigricans Thompson, 1976
- Quichuana nigropilosa Montoya & Ricarte, 2017
- Quichuana parisii Ceresa, 1934
- Quichuana personata Ricarte & Marcos-García, 2012
- Quichuana picadoi Knab, 1913
- Quichuana pogonosa Fluke, 1937
- Quichuana pulverifacies Ricarte & Hancock, 2012
- Quichuana quixotea Hull, 1946
- Quichuana rieseli Shannon, 1927
- Quichuana rubicunda Ricarte & Rotheray, 2012
- Quichuana salvadorensis Ricarte, 2012
- Quichuana seiferti Ricarte & Hancock, 2012
- Quichuana simonetta Hull, 1946
- Quichuana solitaria Ricarte & Marcos-García, 2012
- Quichuana subcostalis (Walker, 1860)
- Quichuana sylvicola Knab, 1913
- Quichuana tica Ricarte & Rotheray, 2012
- Quichuana undulantipila Ricarte & Hancock, 2012
- Quichuana undulatipila Ricarte & Hancock, 2012
- Quichuana ursula Hull, 1949
- Quichuana vicentinae Ricarte, 2012
- Quichuana zoricae Ricarte, 2012

gbif
