= Macrophage (ecology) =

The terms "macrophage" and "microphage" are used in ecology to describe heterotrophs that consume food in two different ways. Both macrophages and microphages "ingest solid food and may process it through some sort of alimentary canal." However, a macrophage "handles food items singly, while a microphage handles food items in bulk without manipulating them individually." Microphages include suspension feeders, and often incidentally digest low-quality food items.

Another category of heterotrophs based on feeding mechanism, known as "osmotrophs," is made up of organisms (primarily fungi and bacteria) that absorb organism matter directly across their cell membranes.

The terms "macrophage" and "microphage" were originally used in this sense by Jordan and Hirsch (1927; cited in Yonge 1928). Although they have been used in ecology texts as recently as 2002, the terms macrophage and microphage today are primarily used to describe two different types of white blood cells in the vertebrate immune system
