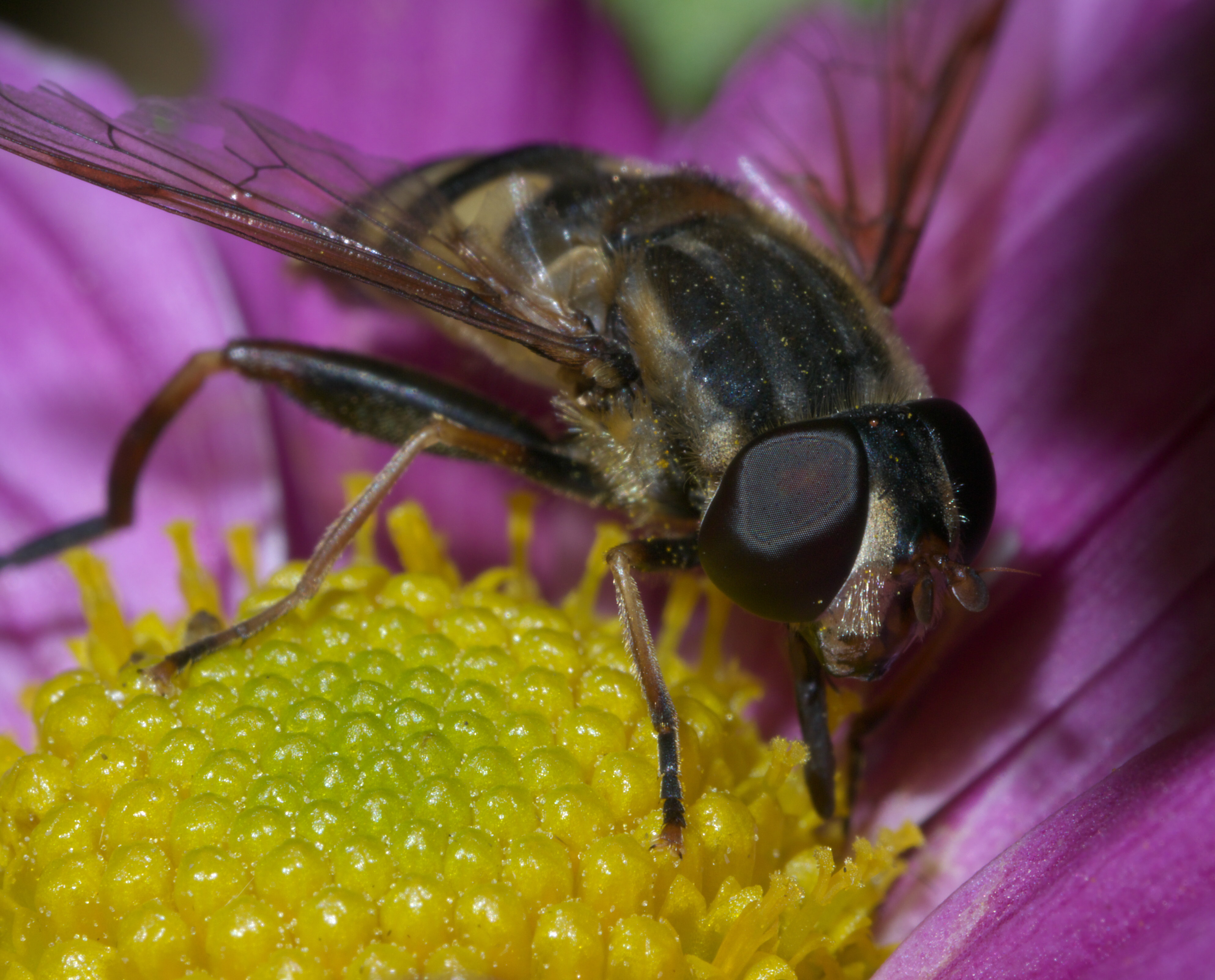
- Helophilus, marsh flies

Scientific classification
- Kingdom: Animalia
- Phylum: Arthropoda
- Clade: Pancrustacea
- Class: Insecta
- Order: Diptera
- Family: Syrphidae
- Subfamily: Eristalinae
- Tribe: Eristalini
- Subtribe: Helophilina; Becker, 1923

= Helophilina =

Subtribe of flies

Helophilina is a subtribe of rat-tail maggot flies in the family Syrphidae. There are at least 19 genera and more than 180 described species in Helophilina.

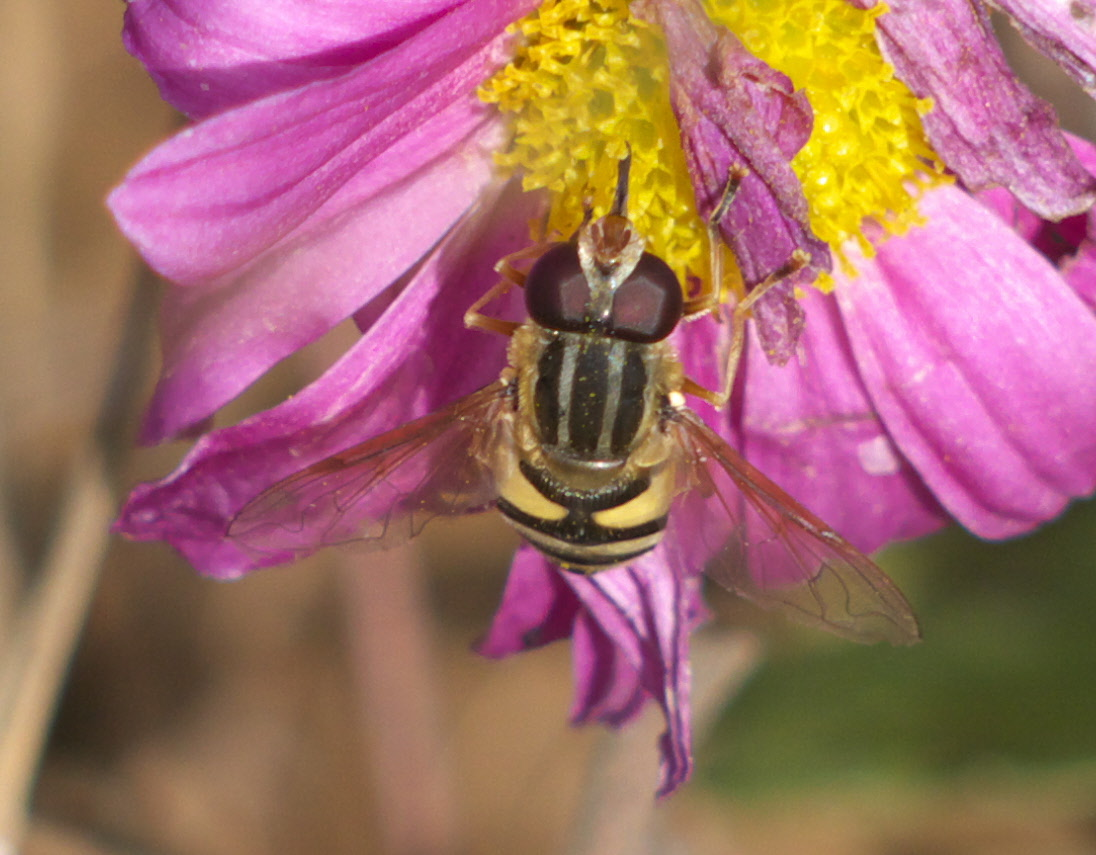
Helophilus, marsh flies

== Genera ==
These 19 genera belong to the subtribe Helophilina:

- Anasimyia Schiner, 1864
- Arctosyrphus Frey, 1918
- Asemosyrphus Bigot, 1882
- Austrophilus Thompson, 2000
- Chasmomma Bezzi, 1915
- Dolichogyna Macquart, 1842
- Eurimyia Bigot, 1883
- Habromyia Williston, 1888
- Helophilus Fabricius, 1805 (marsh flies)
- Lejops Rondani, 1857
- Lunomyia Curran & Fluke, 1926
- Lycopale Hull, 1944
- Mallota Meigen, 1822 (mimic flies)
- Mesembrius Rondani, 1857
- Myathropa Rondani, 1845
- Ohmyia Thompson, 1999
- Parhelophilus Girschner, 1897 (bog flies)
- Polydontomyia Williston, 1896
- Quichuana Knab, 1913
