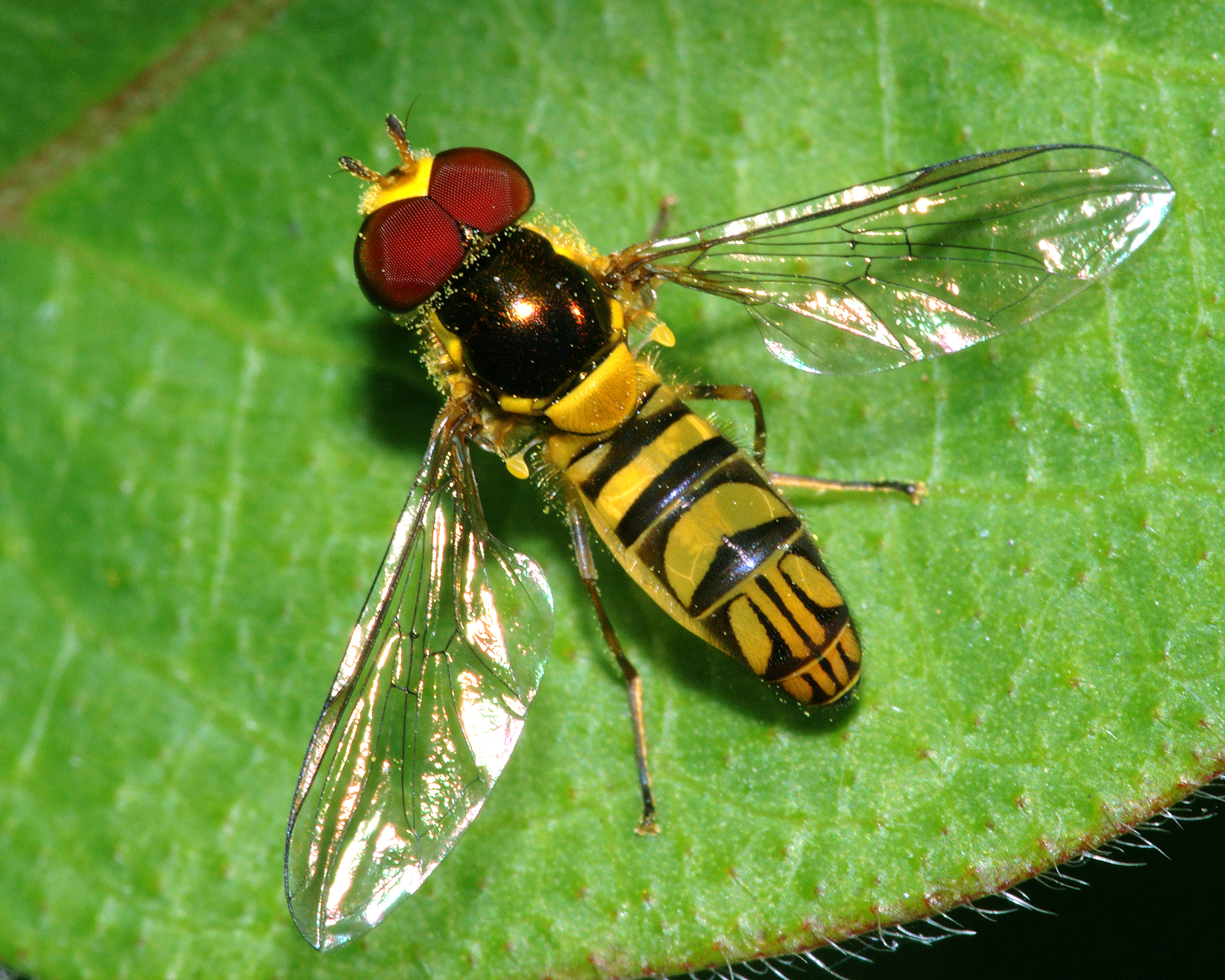
- Allograpta obliqua male

Scientific classification
- Kingdom: Animalia
- Phylum: Arthropoda
- Class: Insecta
- Order: Diptera
- Family: Syrphidae
- Subfamily: Syrphinae
- Tribe: Syrphini
- Genus: Allograpta; Osten Sacken, 1875

Type species
- Scaeva obliqua Say, 1823

Synonyms
- Miogramma Frey, 1946; Neoscaeva Frey, 1946; Helenomyia Bankowska, 1962; Paraxanthogramma Tao & Chiu, 1971 (Unav.)

= Allograpta =

Genus of flies

Allograpta is a very large and diverse genus of hoverflies present throughout the world except most of the palearctic region. The adults are brightly coloured flower pollinators and most larvae have a predatory feeding mode involving soft-bodied sternorrhynchans. Certain species have diverged from this and their larvae have been found to be leaf-miners, stem-borers or pollen-feeders.

Allograpta is currently being studied using both molecular and morphological methods to produce a robust phylogeny of the genus and its related genera. Preliminary studies show the genus to be monophyletic but with the genera Sphaerophoria and Exallandra placed within which complicates matters. A 2009 review concluded that a more complete review is needed before major taxonomic changes could occur i.e. splitting the genus up or incorporating related genera, and the former subgenera were later elevated to genera in 2012.

== List of species by species group ==
Allograpta (s.s.)Osten Sacken, 1875

Allograpta obliqua species group

(Afrotropical)

- A. borbonica Kassebeer, 2000
- A. calopoides (Curran, 1938)
- A. calopus (Loew, 1858)
- A. fuscotibialis (Macquart, 1842)
- A. hypoxantha (Bezzi, 1923)
- A. nasuta (Macquart, 1842)
- A. nigra (Keiser, 1971)
- A. nummularia (Bezzi, 1920)
- A. phaeoptera (Bezzi, 1920)
- A. rediviva (Bezzi, 1915)
- A. rufifacies (Keiser, 1971)
- A. tenella (Keiser, 1971)
- A. varipes (Curran, 1927)

(Oriental & Palearctic)

- A. dravida Ghorpade, 1994
- A. javana (Wiedemann, 1824)
- A. kinabalensis (Curran, 1931)
- A. maculipleura (Brunetti, 1913)
- A. maritima Mutin, 1986
- A. medanensis (Meijere, 1914)
- A. obscuricornis Meijere, 1914
- A. philippina Frey, 1946
- A. purpureicollis (Frey, 1946)
- A. robinsoni (Curran, 1928)

(Australasia & Oceania)

- A. amphoterum (Bezzi, 1928)
- A. atkinsoni (Miller, 1921)
- A. australensis (Schiner, 1868)
- A. buruensis Meijere, 1929
- A. citronella (Shiraki, 1963)
- A. distincta (Kertész, 1899)
- A. flavofaciens (Miller, 1921)
- A. hirsutifera (Hull, 1949)
- A. hudsoni (Miller, 1921)
- A. longulus (Shiraki, 1963)
- A. neofasciata Thompson, 1989
- A. pallida (Bigot, 1884)
- A. pseudoropalus (Miller, 1921)
- A. ropalus (Walker, 1849)
- A. septemvittata (Shiraki, 1963)

(Nearctic & Neotropical)

- A. aeruginosifrons (Schiner, 1868)
- A. annulipes (Macquart, 1850)
- A. aperta Fluke, 1942
- A. bilineella Enderlein, 1938
- A. browni Fluke, 1942
- A. exotica (Wiedemann, )[3]
- A. falcata Fluke, 1942
- A. hastata Fluke, 1942
- A. hortensis (Pjilippi, 1865)
- A. insularis Thompson, 1981
- A. limbata (Fabricius, 1805)
- A. neotropica Curran, 1936
- A. nigripilosa (Hull, 1944)
- A. obliqua (Say, 1823)
- A. obscuricornis (Meijere, 1914)
- A. philippina (Frey, 1946)
- A. piurana Shannon, 1927
- A. pulchra Shannon, 1927
- A. radiata Bigot, 1857
- A. robinsoniana Enderlein, 1938
- A. splendens (Thomson, 1869)
- A. tectiforma Fluke, 1942
- A. teligera Fluke, 1942
- A. trilimbata Bigot, 1889

Allograpta alamacula species group

- A. alamacula Carver, 2003

Allograpta ventralis species group

- A. dorsalis (Miller, 1924)
- A. ventralis (Miller, 1921)

unranked

- A. neosplendens Thompson, in litt.

Former subgenera:

Genus Antillus Vockeroth, 1969

- A. ascitus (Vockeroth, 1969)

Genus Claraplumula Shannon, 1927

- C. latifacies (Shannon, 1927)

Genus Rhinoprosopa Hull, 1942

- R. aenea (Hull, 1937)
- R. flavophylla (Hull, 1943)
- R. lucifera (Hull, 1943)
- R. neonasuta Thompson,
- R. sycorax (Hull, 1947)

Genus Tiquicia Thompson, 2012

- T. zumbadoi Thompson, 2000
- T. nishida Mengual & Thompson, 2009
