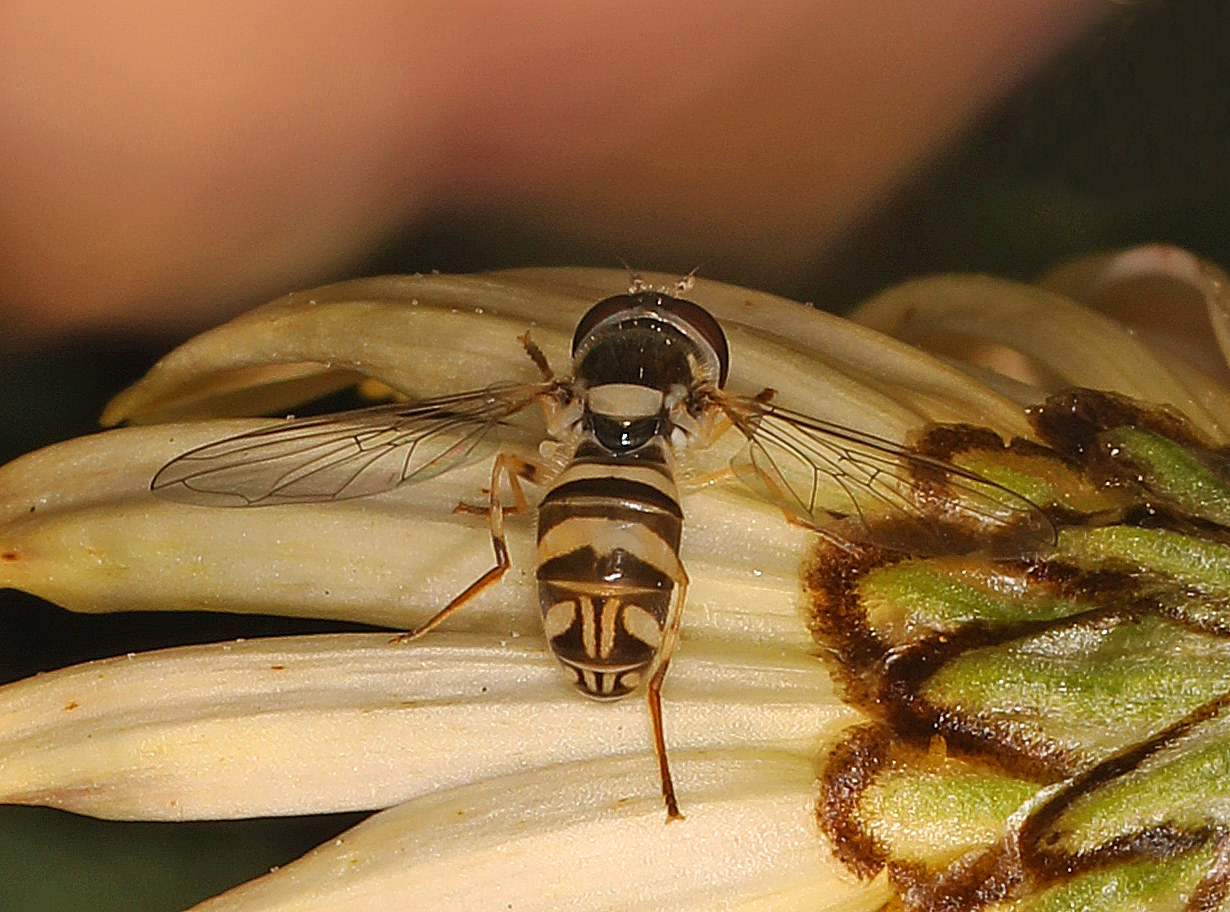

Scientific classification
- Domain: Eukaryota
- Kingdom: Animalia
- Phylum: Arthropoda
- Class: Insecta
- Order: Diptera
- Family: Syrphidae
- Genus: Allograpta
- Species: A. exotica

Binomial name
- Allograpta exotica (Wiedemann, 1830)

Synonyms
- Allograpta fracta Osten Sacken, 1877; Syrphus exoticus Wiedemann, 1830

= Allograpta exotica =

Species of fly

Allograpta exotica is a species in the family Syrphidae ("syrphid flies"), in the order Diptera ("flies"). Larvae are often predators of aphids. Their life cycle from egg to adults is around 15 days, with adults living for approximately 10 days.
