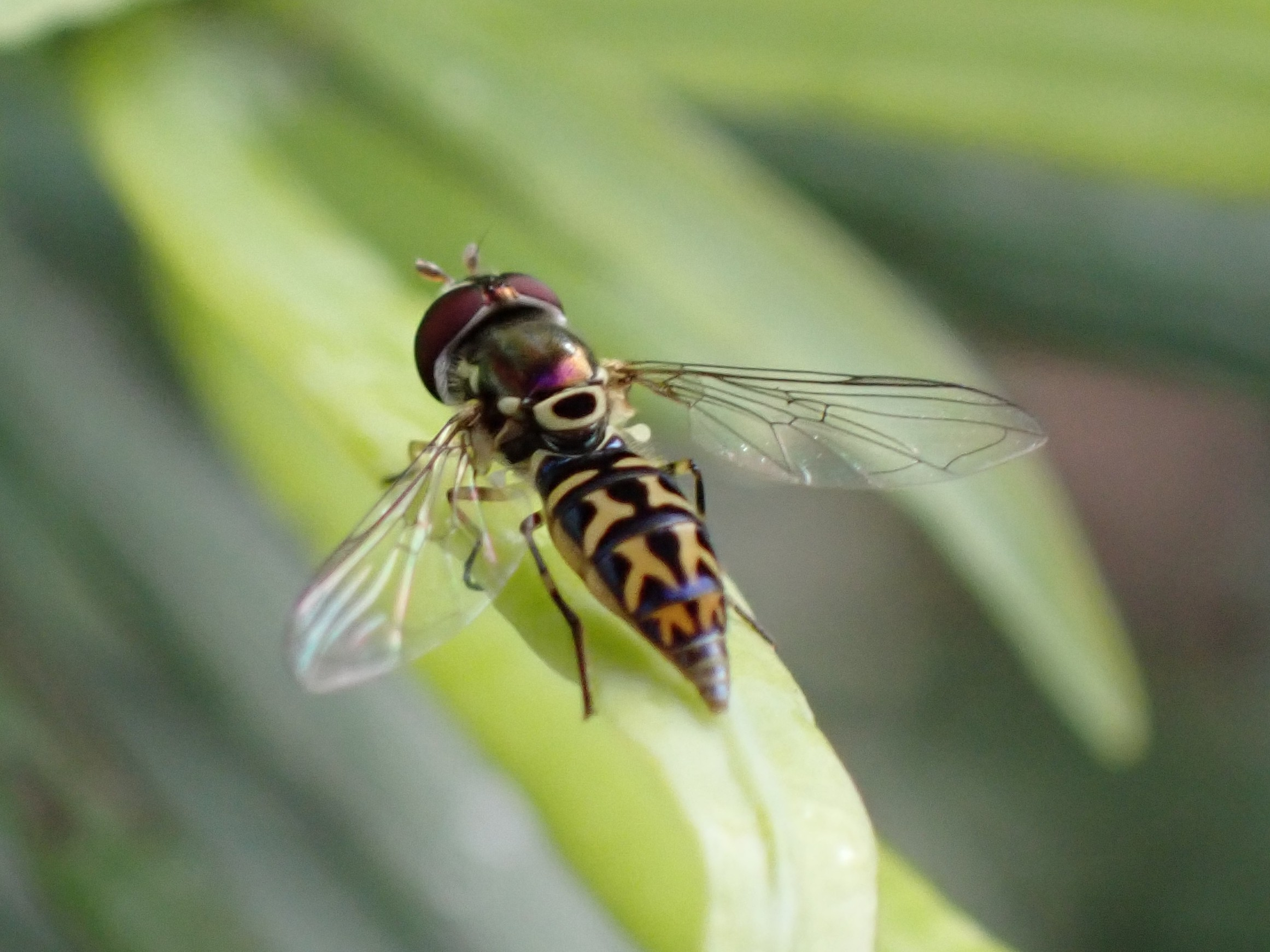

Scientific classification
- Domain: Eukaryota
- Kingdom: Animalia
- Phylum: Arthropoda
- Class: Insecta
- Order: Diptera
- Family: Syrphidae
- Tribe: Syrphini
- Genus: Allograpta
- Species: A. radiata

Binomial name
- Allograpta radiata (Bigot, 1857)

Synonyms
- Allograpta cubana Curran, 1932; Allograpta venusta Curran, 1927; Syrphus radiata Bigot, 1857

= Allograpta radiata =

Species of fly

Allograpta radiata is a species of syrphid fly in the family Syrphidae.
