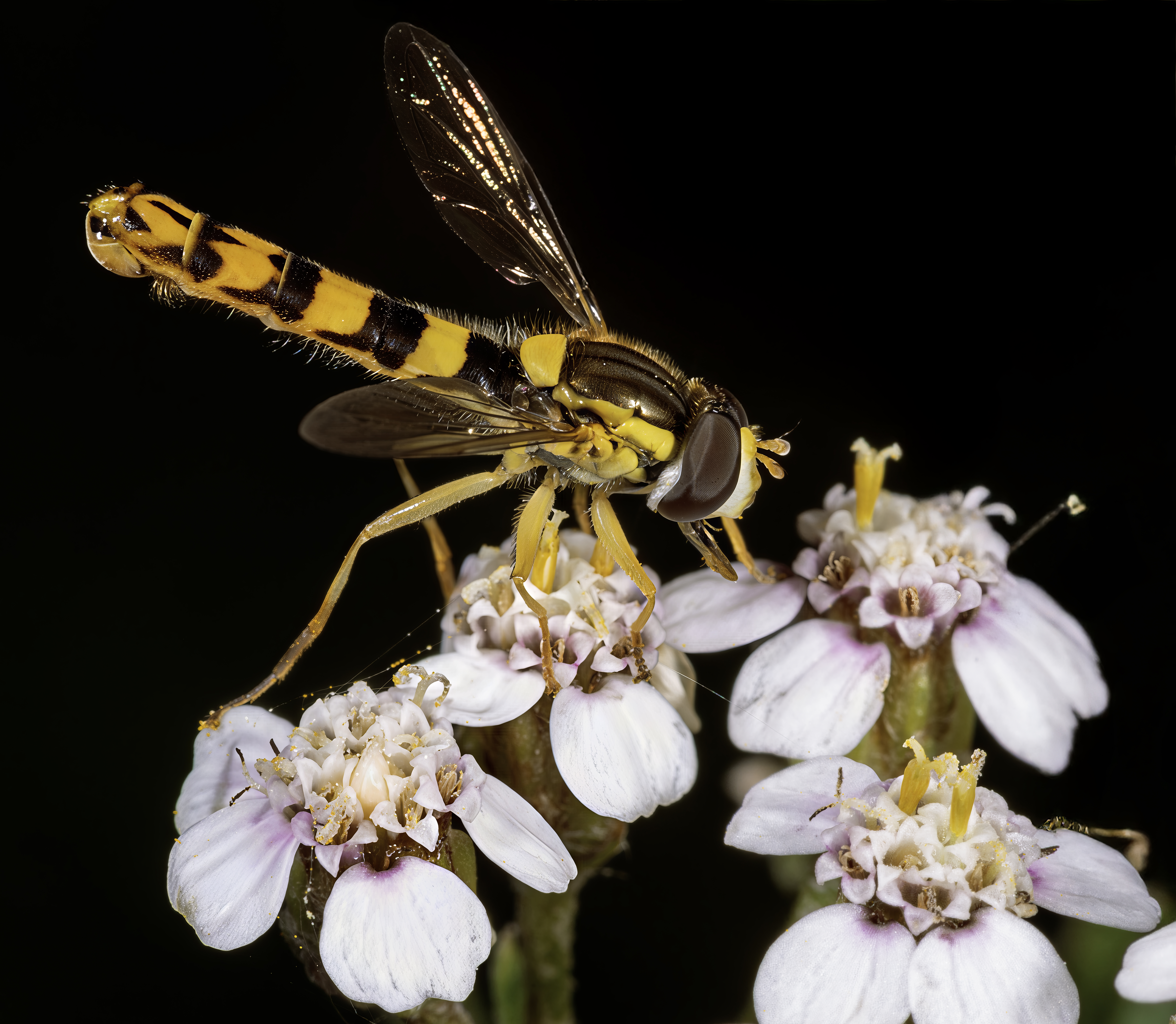
- Male
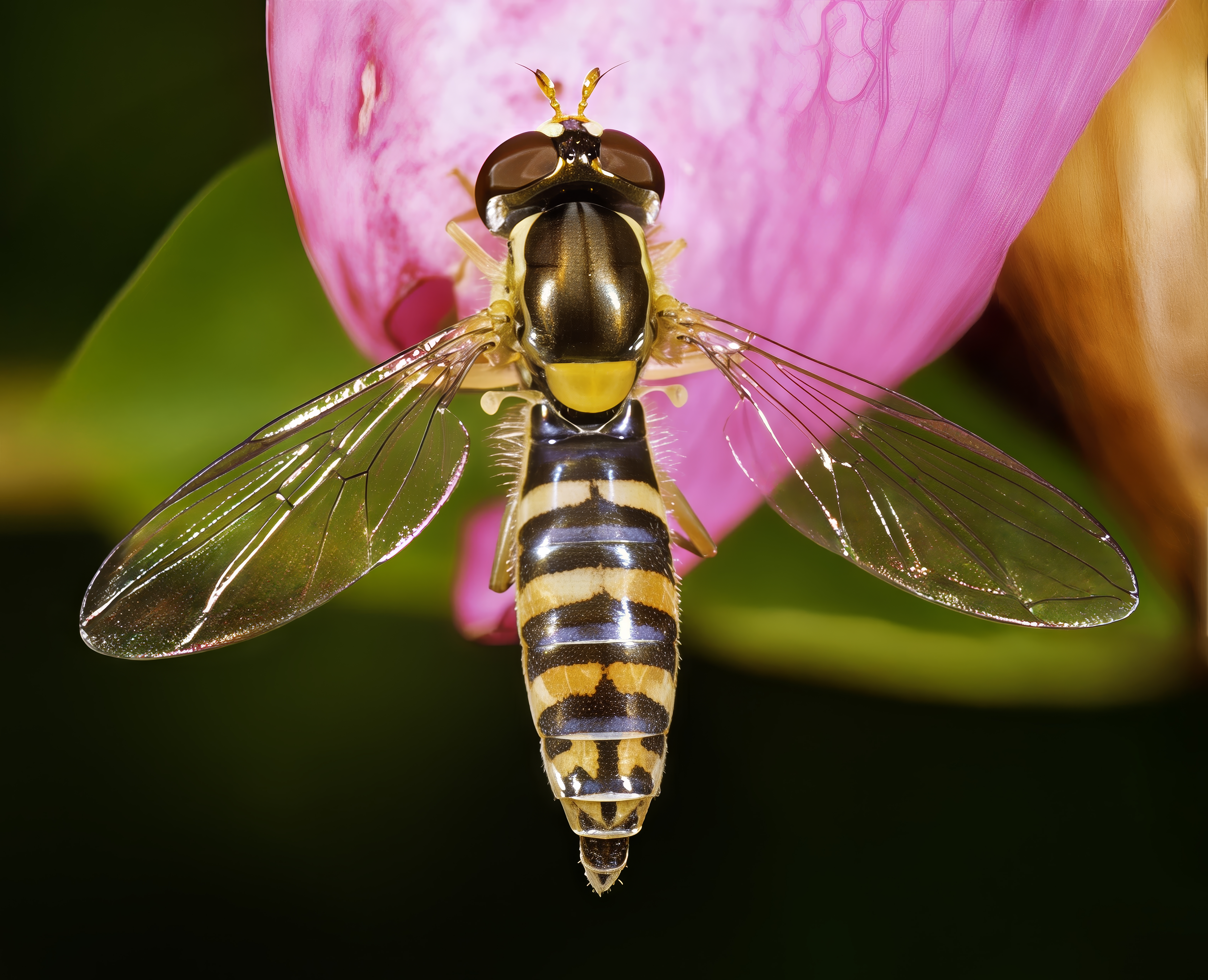
- Female

Scientific classification
- Kingdom: Animalia
- Phylum: Arthropoda
- Class: Insecta
- Order: Diptera
- Family: Syrphidae
- Genus: Sphaerophoria
- Species: S. scripta

Binomial name
- Sphaerophoria scripta (Linnaeus, 1758)

Synonyms
- List: Melithreptus dispar Loew, 840; Musca invisito Harris, 1780; Musca molita Harris, 1780; Musca scripta Linnaeus, 1758; Sphaerophoria dispar (Loew, 1840); Sphaerophoria invisito (Harris, 1780); Sphaerophoria molita (Harris, 1780); Sphaerophoria strigata Stæger, 1845

= Sphaerophoria scripta =

Species of fly

Sphaerophoria scripta, the long hoverfly, is a species of hoverfly belonging to the family Syrphidae.

== Distribution ==
This species has a worldwide distribution. It can be found in most of Europe, in the eastern Palearctic realm, in the Near East, in the Nearctic realm, in North Africa and in the Indomalayan realm.

== Habitat ==
This species lives in thickets, gardens and meadows rich of flowering plants. Adults can pollinate flowering plants such as Galeopsis angustifolia and Silene gallica, which S. scripta are the most effective pollinators of.

== Description ==
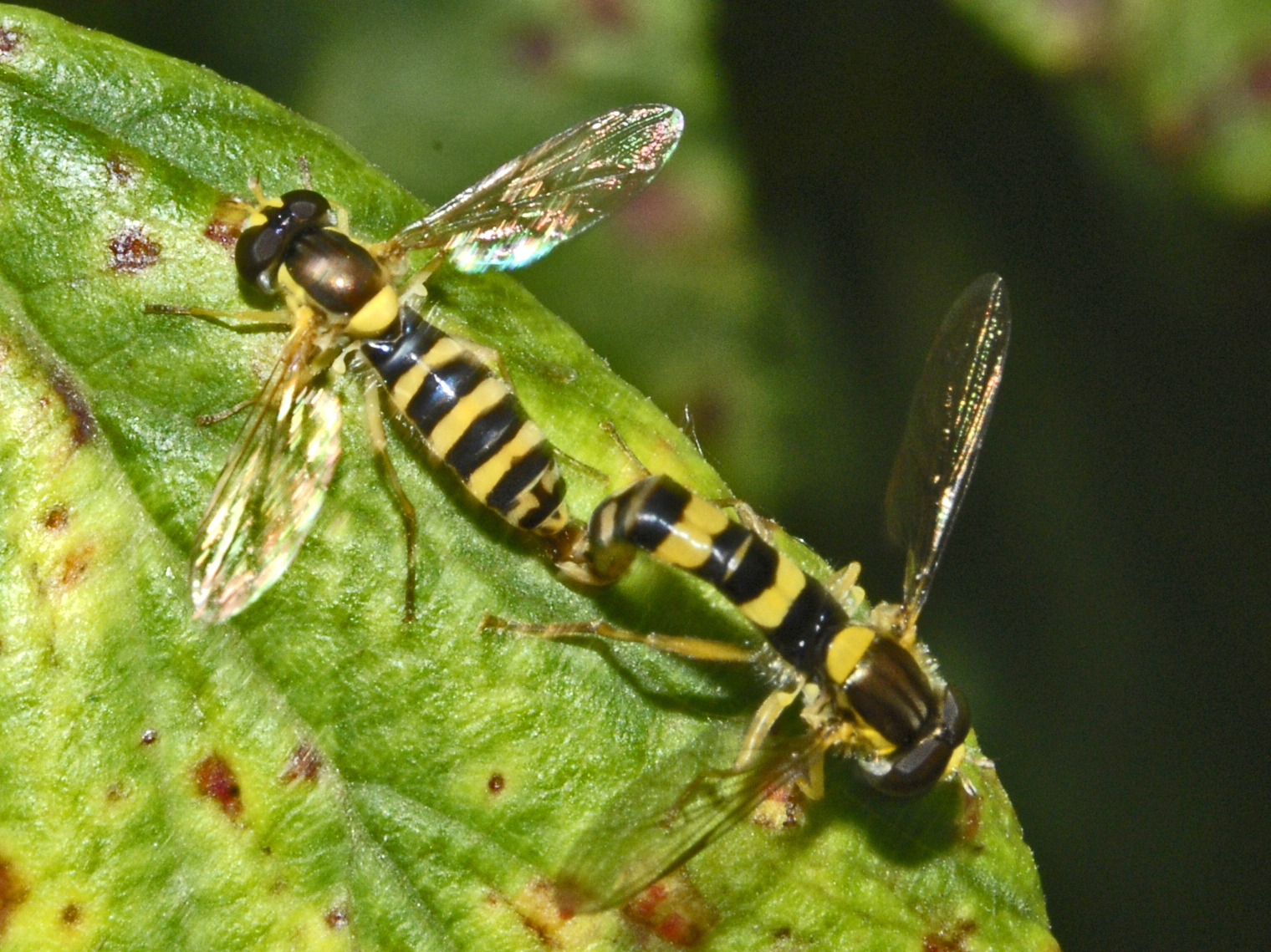
Mating pair

Sphaerophoria scripta can reach a length of 7–12 millimetres (0.28–0.47 in) and a wingspan of 5–7 mm. Body is long and narrow, with yellow and black bands. The wings are transparent. Antennae are short and yellow. The face is yellow. Thorax is a bit dull, copper colored with broad yellow side stripes. Scutellum is yellow. Abdomen is long and cylindrical with four wide, yellow transverse bands. The legs are yellow. Females are brighter than the males. In the males the last two bands are often blurred.

== Biology ==
The adult hoverflies can be found from April to November. The larvae feed on aphids, while adult hoverflies feed on nectar and pollen of various species of Asteraceae, as well as on Heracleum sphondylium, Galeopsis tetrahit, Malva moschata and Parnassia palustris.

These hoverflies can complete a full life cycle in as little as sixteen days (egg to egg-laying adult), and a maximum of nine generations may occur in a single year. This species is migratory and overwinter as larva.

== Gallery ==
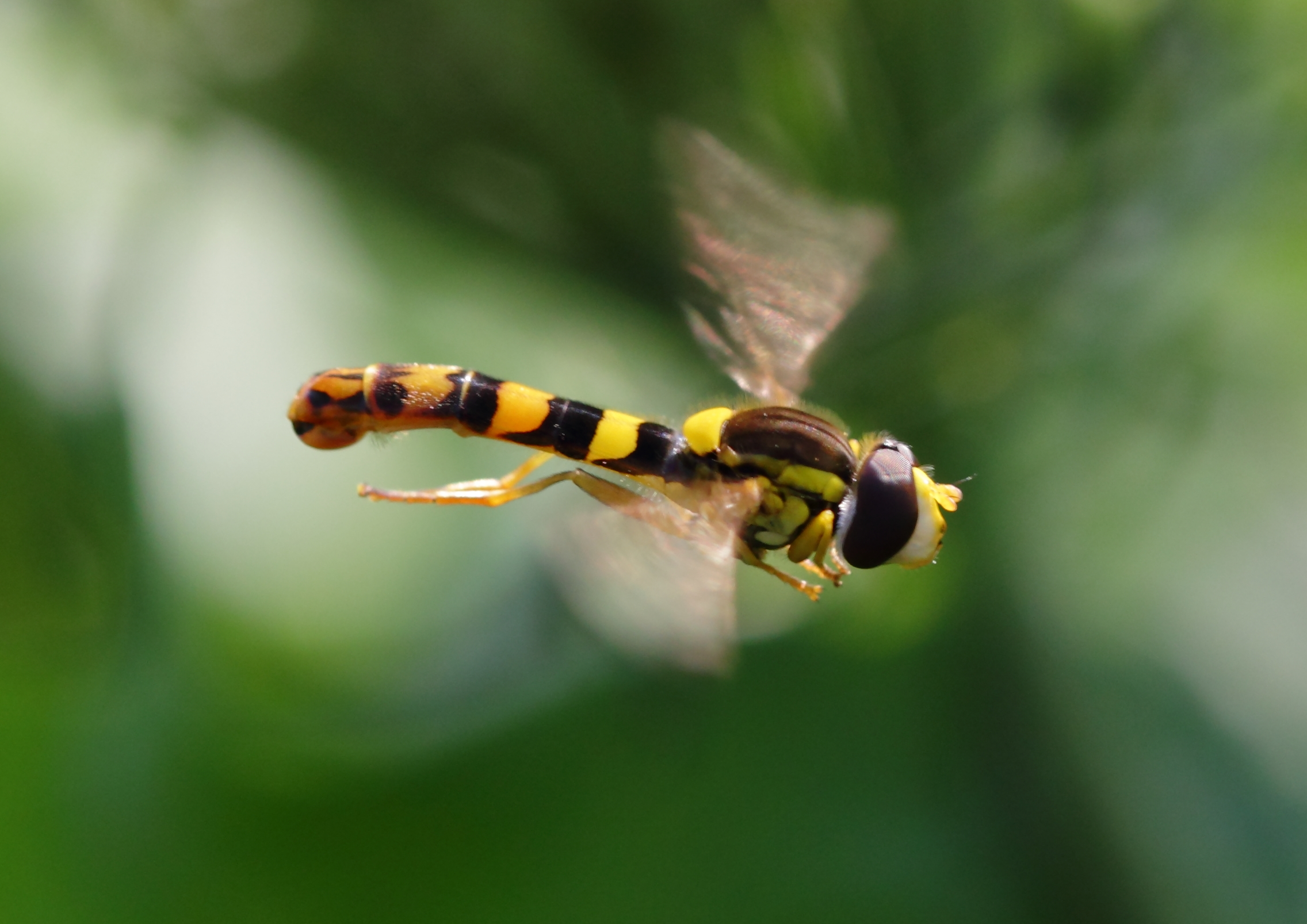
Male in flight

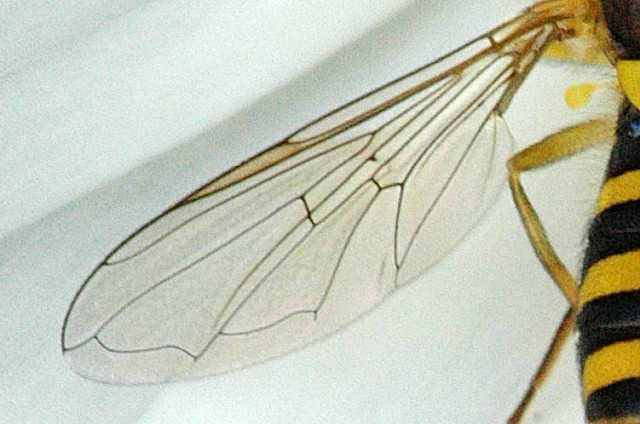
Detail of wings

Sphaerophoria scripta in copula
