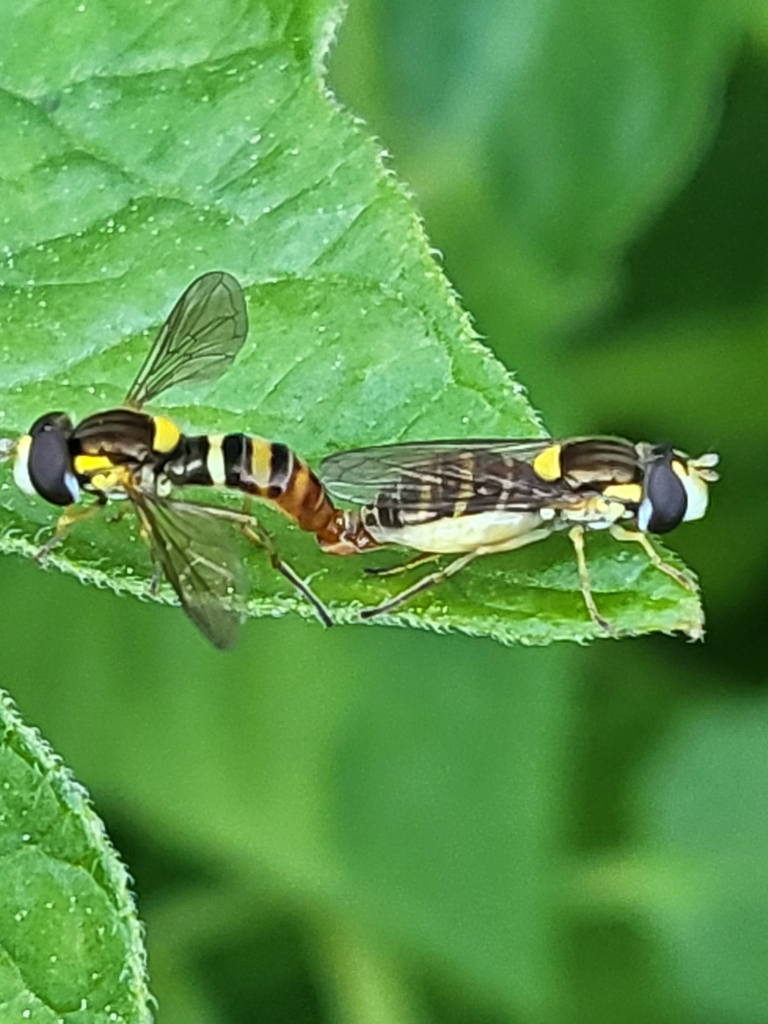
- Forked Globetail flies (Sphaerophoria sulphuripes) mating

Scientific classification
- Kingdom: Animalia
- Phylum: Arthropoda
- Clade: Pancrustacea
- Class: Insecta
- Order: Diptera
- Family: Syrphidae
- Genus: Sphaerophoria
- Species: S. sulphuripes

Binomial name
- Sphaerophoria sulphuripes (Thomson, 1869)

Synonyms
- Syrphus sulphuripes Thomson, 1869; Syrphus infumatus Thomson, 1869; Sphaerophoria dubia Bigot, 1884; Sphaerophoria melanosa Williston, 1887

= Sphaerophoria sulphuripes =

Species of fly

Sphaerophoria sulphuripes, the forked globetail, is a species of syrphid flies in the family Syrphidae native to Western North America.
