= Exallandra =

Scientific classification
- Kingdom: Animalia
- Phylum: Arthropoda
- Clade: Pancrustacea
- Class: Insecta
- Order: Diptera
- Family: Syrphidae
- Genus: Sphaerophoria
- Subgenus: Exallandra; Vockeroth, 1969

Type species
- Syrphus cinctifacies Speiser, 1910

Synonyms
- Prosphaerophoria Barkalov, 2012

Subgenus of flies

Exallandra is a subgenus of hoverflies in the subfamily Syrphinae, within the genus Sphaerophoria.

== Species ==
- Sphaerophoria cinctifacies (Speiser, 1910)
- Sphaerophoria loewii Zetterstedt, 1843
