= Tiquicia =

Scientific classification
- Kingdom: Animalia
- Phylum: Arthropoda
- Class: Insecta
- Order: Diptera
- Family: Syrphidae
- Tribe: Syrphini
- Genus: Tiquicia; Thompson, 2012

Synonyms
- Costarica Mengual & Thompson, 2009 (Homonym); Allograpta (Costarica) Mengual & Thompson, 2009

Genus of flies

Tiquicia is a genus in the family Syrphidae ("hover flies"). It was previously considered to be a subgenus of Allograpta. It was first described as Allograpta (Costarica) in 2009.

== Species ==
Tiquicia nishida (Mengual & Thompson, 2009)
Tiquicia zumbadoi (Thompson, 2000)
