= Sphaerophoria asymmetrica =

Scientific classification
- Kingdom: Animalia
- Phylum: Arthropoda
- Class: Insecta
- Order: Diptera
- Family: Syrphidae
- Subfamily: Syrphinae
- Tribe: Syrphini
- Genus: Sphaerophoria
- Species: S. asymmetrica

Binomial name
- Sphaerophoria asymmetrica Knutson, 1972

Synonyms
- Syrphus simulatus Harris, 1835

Hoverfly

Sphaerophoria asymmetrica ( Knutson, 1972 ), the asymmetric globetail , is a common species of syrphid fly observed across northern North America. Hoverflies can remain nearly motionless in flight. The adults are also known as flower flies for they are commonly found on flowers from which they get both energy-giving nectar and protein rich pollen. The larvae feed on aphids.
