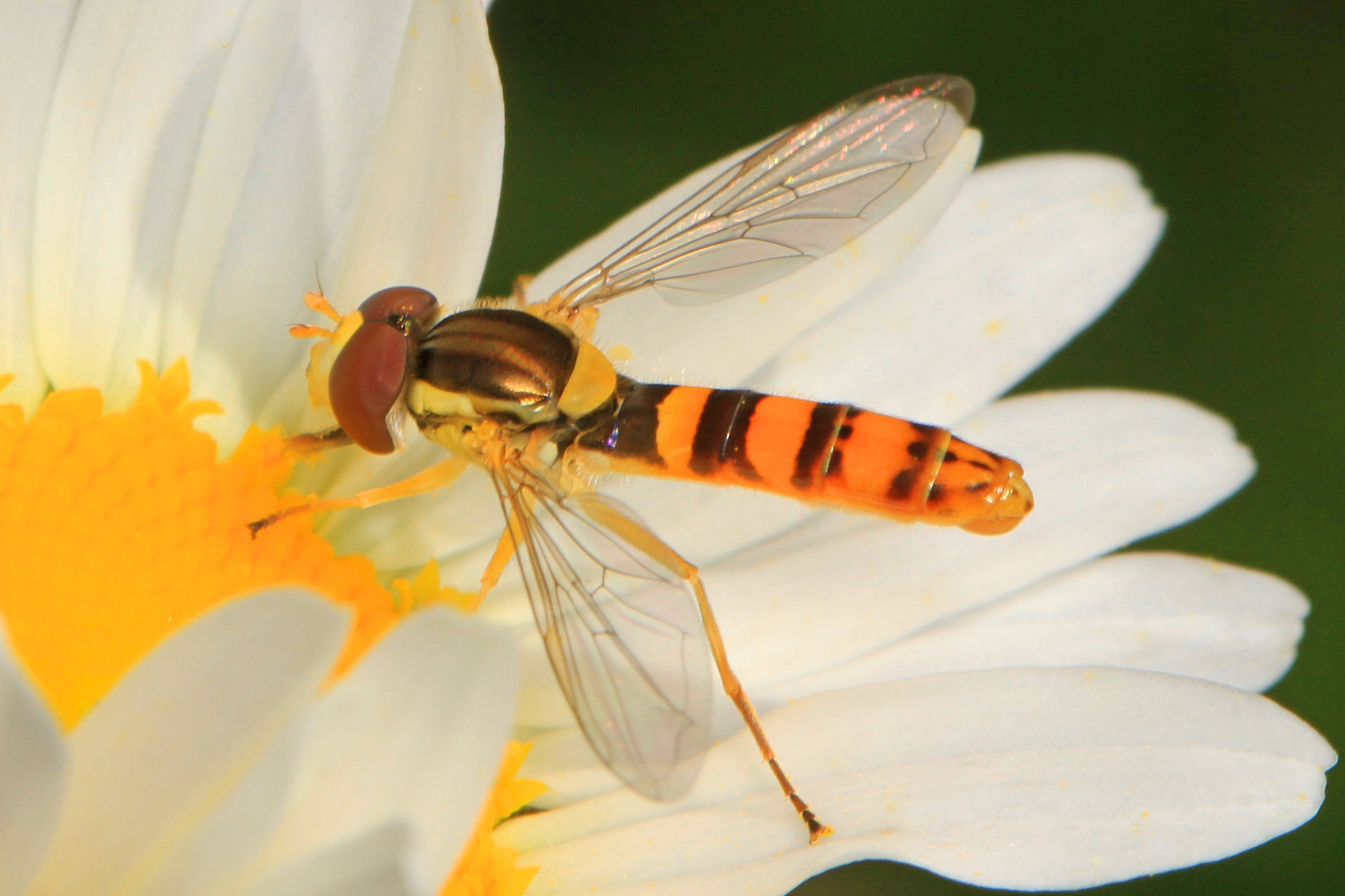

Scientific classification
- Domain: Eukaryota
- Kingdom: Animalia
- Phylum: Arthropoda
- Class: Insecta
- Order: Diptera
- Family: Syrphidae
- Tribe: Syrphini
- Genus: Sphaerophoria
- Species: S. philanthus

Binomial name
- Sphaerophoria philanthus Meigen

Synonyms
- Syrphus philanthus Meigen, 1822; Sphaerophoria nigritarsis Fluke, 1930; Sphaerophoria robusta Curran, 1930; Sphaerophoria philantha Auctt. (Misspelling)

= Sphaerophoria philanthus =

Species of fly

Sphaerophoria philanthus is a species of syrphid fly in the family Syrphidae. It is found in Europe.
