= Sphaerophoria bankowskae =

Scientific classification
- Kingdom: Animalia
- Phylum: Arthropoda
- Class: Insecta
- Order: Diptera
- Family: Syrphidae
- Genus: Sphaerophoria
- Species: S. bankowskae

Binomial name
- Sphaerophoria bankowskae Goeldlin, 1989

Species of fly

Sphaerophoria bankowskae is a European species of hoverfly.
