= Allograpta piurana =

Scientific classification
- Domain: Eukaryota
- Kingdom: Animalia
- Phylum: Arthropoda
- Class: Insecta
- Order: Diptera
- Family: Syrphidae
- Genus: Allograpta
- Species: A. piurana

Binomial name
- Allograpta piurana Shannon, 1927

Synonyms
- Allograpta chilensis Sack, 1941; Allograpta harlequina Hull, 1949

Species of hoverfly

Allograpta piurana is a species of hoverfly.

== Description ==
This species was described by Shannon (1927) based on a female specimen collected in the Department Piura in Peru. It is part of the Allograpta obliqua species group.

== Range ==
This species has been recorded in Chile and Peru.

== Habitat ==
Inland valleys to highland ecosystems.

== Biology ==
Barahona-Segovia et al (2021) lists the following, mainly exotic, plants visited by this species: E. pectinatus; Myoporum sp.; Rosa sp.; T. officinale; Phoenix dactylifera L.; and Veronica persica Poir.

== Etymology ==
Shannon (1927) did not explicitly state the etymology of the specific epithet, but it seems to be derived from the Department where the type specimen was collected, Piura.

== Taxonomy ==
Shannon (1927) distinguished A. piurana from A. hortensis Philippi by a yellow spot on the metapleura (=katatergum + anatergum), dark apical margin of the scutellum, oblique pair of bands on the second tergite, and yellow markings of remaining tergites more parallel to each other.
