= Sphaerophoria beattiei =

Conservation status
- Least Concern (IUCN 3.1)

Scientific classification
- Kingdom: Animalia
- Phylum: Arthropoda
- Class: Insecta
- Order: Diptera
- Family: Syrphidae
- Genus: Sphaerophoria
- Species: S. beattiei

Binomial name
- Sphaerophoria beattiei (Doesburg and Doesburg, 1977)

Species of hoverfly

Sphaerophoria beattiei is a species of hoverfly belonging to the genus Sphaerophoria. It is endemic to the island of Saint Helena in the South Atlantic. It was originally considered the only member of the genus Loveridgeana but was found to be nested within Sphaerophoria in a DNA based phylogenetic analysis, along with three other species found in South Africa. Almost nothing is known of its biology other than it pollinated now extinct flora on Saint Helena including the Saint Helena olive.
