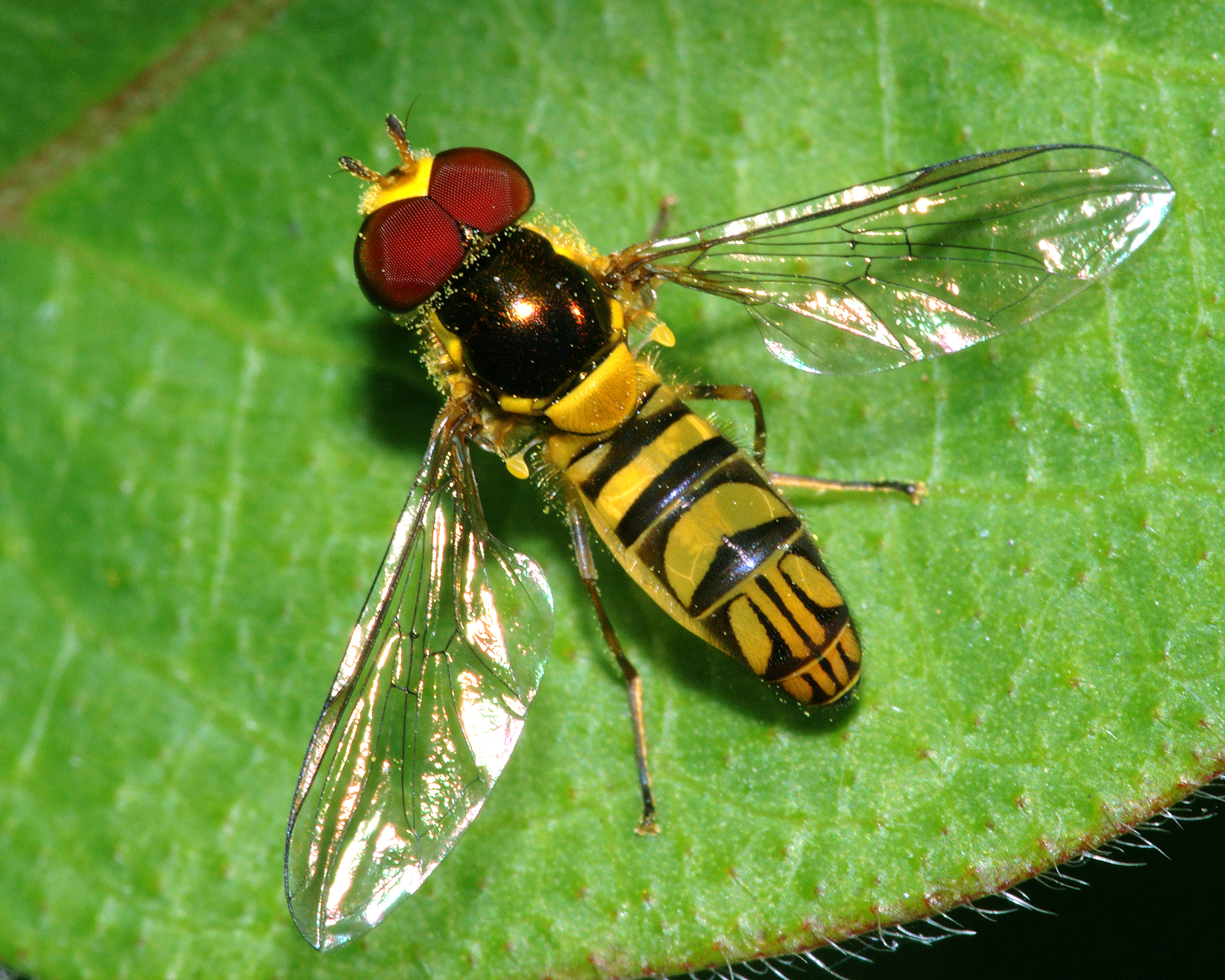
- Male
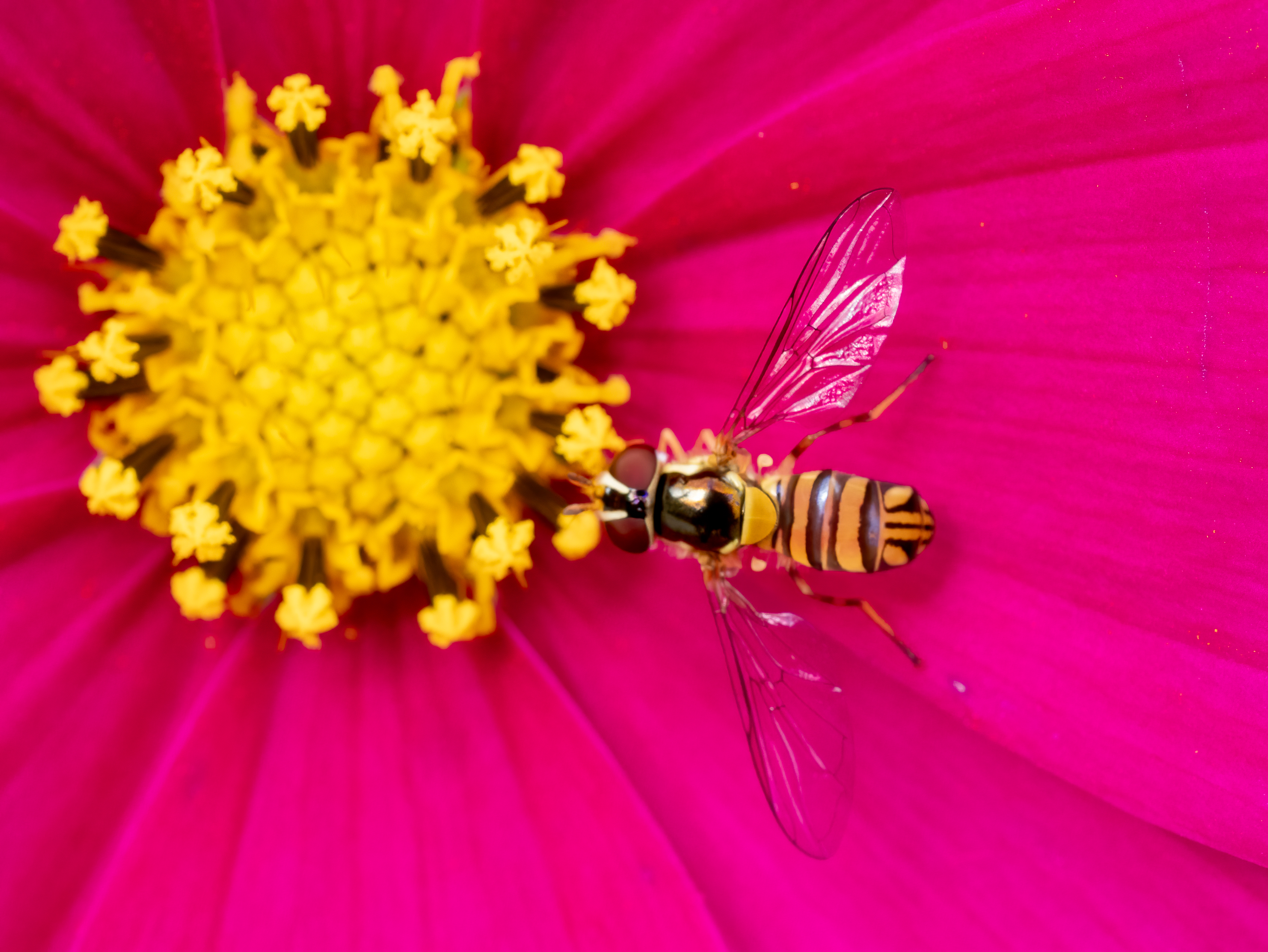
- Female

Scientific classification
- Kingdom: Animalia
- Phylum: Arthropoda
- Class: Insecta
- Order: Diptera
- Family: Syrphidae
- Genus: Allograpta
- Species: A. obliqua

Binomial name
- Allograpta obliqua (Say, 1823)

Synonyms
- Scaeva obliqua Say, 1823; Syrphus baccides Walker, 1849; Syrphus dimemsus Walker, 1852; Syrphus securiferus Macquart, 1842; Syrphus signatus Wulp, 1867

= Allograpta obliqua =

Species of fly

Allograpta obliqua is a common North American species of hoverfly, commonly known as oblique streaktail. The larvae are important predators of aphids while adults are pollinators.

== Description ==
Adults are 6–7 mm long, with yellow stripes on the thorax and cross banding on the abdomen with four longitudinal, yellow stripes or spots on the fourth and fifth tergite. The face is yellow and lacks a complete median stripe. Males have holoptic eyes and females have dichoptic eyes.

Eggs are white, oval, and about 0.84 mm in length. Larvae reach 8–9 mm. They are bumpy and slug-like.

== Life history ==
Adults of A. obliqua occur throughout the year in the southern part of their range. Eggs are laid on surfaces leaves or branches near aphids. Larvae hatch in two to eight days and feed on the aphids.

== Distribution ==
Found in most of the continental United States, New York State. Quebec in Canada, Bermuda, Mexico, and some parts of the Neotropical Americas, and the West Indies.
