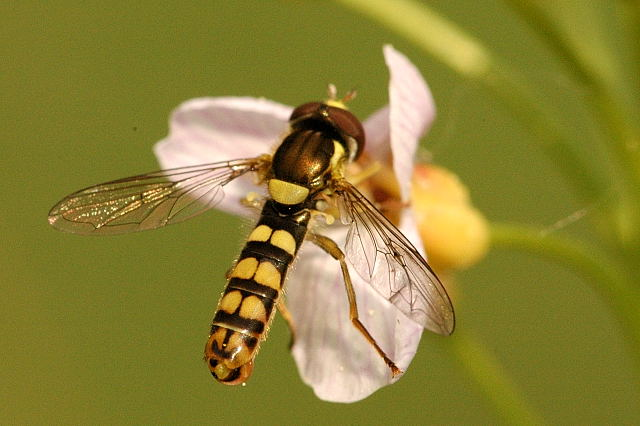
- male

Scientific classification
- Kingdom: Animalia
- Phylum: Arthropoda
- Clade: Pancrustacea
- Class: Insecta
- Order: Diptera
- Family: Syrphidae
- Genus: Sphaerophoria
- Species: S. interrupta

Binomial name
- Sphaerophoria interrupta (Fabricius, 1805)

Synonyms
- Scaeva interrupta Fabricius, 1805; Sphaerophoria menthastri Vockeroth, 1963; Sphaerophoria altaica Violovitsh, 1976; Sphaerophoria picta (Meigen, 1822); Syrphus pictus Meigen, 1822; Sphaerophoria menthastrisensu auctores nec Linnaeus

= Sphaerophoria interrupta =

Species of fly

Sphaerophoria interrupta is a Palearctic species of hoverfly.

== Description ==
External images For terms see Morphology of Diptera
Wing length 4·5-6·25 mm. Tergites 2–4 with pairs of spots, which may merge in the middle and hairs on lateral margin of tergites 3-5 pale. Genitalia figured by Verlinden C. & Verlinden, L. (1991) . See references for determination.

== Distribution ==
Palearctic Fennoscandia South to Iberia and the Mediterranean basin. Ireland East through Europe and European Russia and the Caucasus then to Siberia and Lake Baikal.
