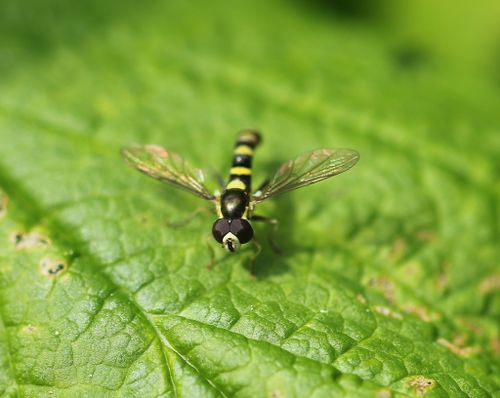
- Sphaerophoria novaeangliae July 4, 2016

Scientific classification
- Domain: Eukaryota
- Kingdom: Animalia
- Phylum: Arthropoda
- Class: Insecta
- Order: Diptera
- Family: Syrphidae
- Tribe: Syrphini
- Genus: Sphaerophoria
- Species: S. novaeangliae

Binomial name
- Sphaerophoria novaeangliae Johnson, 1916

= Sphaerophoria novaeangliae =

Species of fly

Sphaerophoria novaeangliae is a species of syrphid fly in the family Syrphidae.
