= Allograpta robinsoni =

Scientific classification
- Kingdom: Animalia
- Phylum: Arthropoda
- Class: Insecta
- Order: Diptera
- Family: Syrphidae
- Tribe: Syrphini
- Genus: Allograpta
- Species: A. robinsoni

Binomial name
- Allograpta robinsoni (Curran, 1928)

Synonyms
- Sphaerophoria nigrotibialis Curran, 1928

Species of fly

Allograpta robinsoni is a two-winged species of hoverfly found on the Malay peninsula, first described by Charles Howard Curran in 1928. It is an oriental species in the Allograpta obliqua species group.
