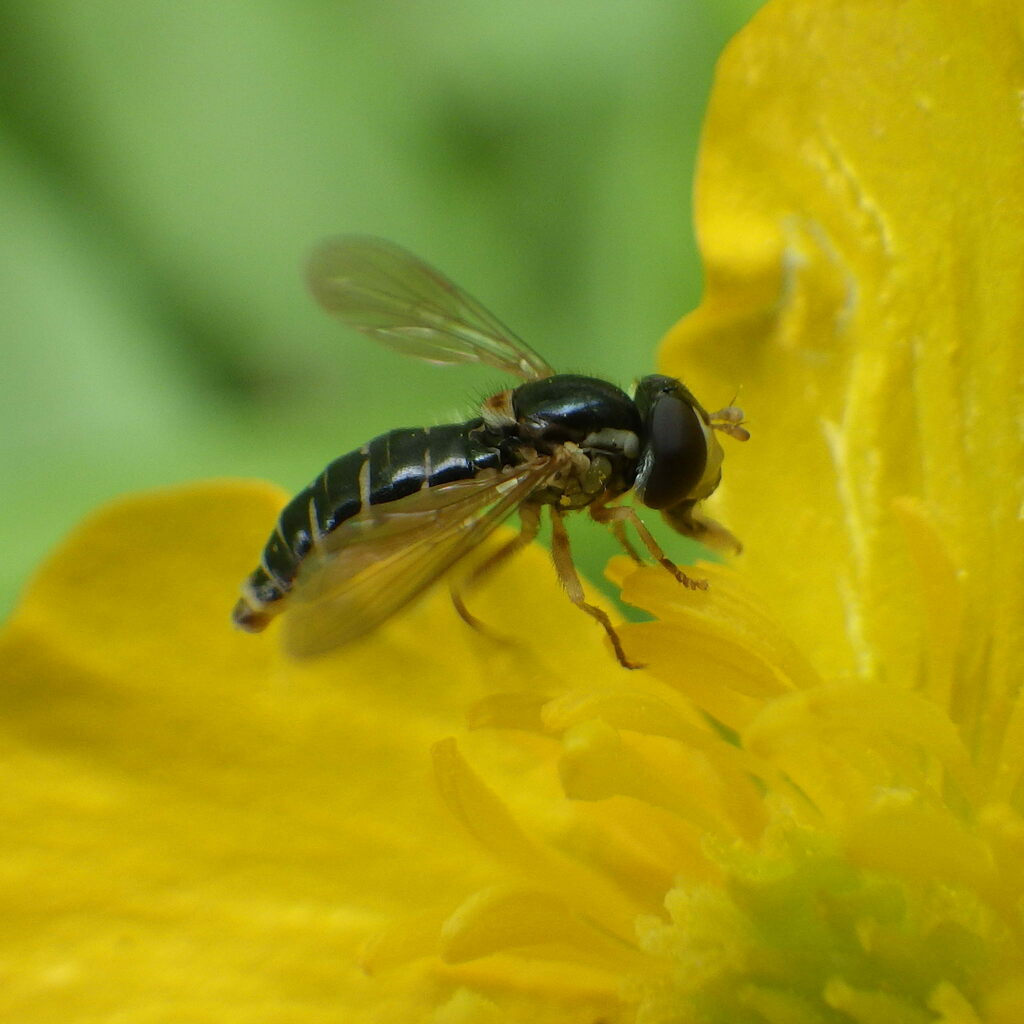

Scientific classification
- Domain: Eukaryota
- Kingdom: Animalia
- Phylum: Arthropoda
- Class: Insecta
- Order: Diptera
- Family: Syrphidae
- Subfamily: Syrphinae
- Tribe: Syrphini
- Genus: Sphaerophoria
- Species: S. bifurcata

Binomial name
- Sphaerophoria bifurcata Knutson 1973

= Sphaerophoria bifurcata =

Species of fly

Sphaerophoria bifurcata, the symmetric globetail, is a species of syrphid fly in the family Syrphidae. The larvae of this genus are predators of aphids and other small hymenoptera. The larvae of this particular species is not known.

== Description ==
For terms see Morphology of Diptera. Diagostic characters are the black frontal stripe that is forked or incised toward anterior, and the tergites with yellow bands that are short, arcuate, narrowly divided or incised posteriorly. Examining the male genitalia is the best way to identify to species.

Size

Length 7.1–8 mm (0.28–0.31 in)

In the male

The frons has numerous black hairs. The scutum has lateral yellow stripes meeting the scutellum. The stripes are sometimes constricted behind suture. The legs hind femur are without long hairs posteroventrally. The legs are yellow with the fore and mid tarsi sometimes brownish. The apical tarsomeres are as pale as or paler than the basal tarsomere. Tergites 2-4 have narrow yellow bands usually entire or narrowly divided. Sternite 2 has long sparse straight hairs. ThesSurstylus has the dorsal lobe depressed, with long hairs along ventral margin. The inner lobe is present but with variable shapes. The ventral lobe is broad, abruptly constricted very near apex, with short preapical toothlike posterior process and short fingerlike apical process. The genitalia are illustrated by Vockeroth

In the female

The frons has a broad median black stripe extending to antennae where it bifurcate apically. The yellow areas of frons has many black hairs. The tergites 2 through 4 have narrow yellow bands mostly entire on 2 and 3 but usually divided on 4.

== Distribution ==
British Columbia, Ontario, New Brunswick, Manitoba, Quebec, Nova Scotia, Alberta, Oregon, Michigan, Maine, New Hampshire.
