= Sphaerophoria pyrrhina =

Scientific classification
- Domain: Eukaryota
- Kingdom: Animalia
- Phylum: Arthropoda
- Class: Insecta
- Order: Diptera
- Family: Syrphidae
- Tribe: Syrphini
- Genus: Sphaerophoria
- Species: S. pyrrhina

Binomial name
- Sphaerophoria pyrrhina Bigot, 1884

Synonyms
- Sphaerophoria guttulata Hull, 1942

Species of fly

Sphaerophoria pyrrhina is a species of syrphid fly in the family Syrphidae.
