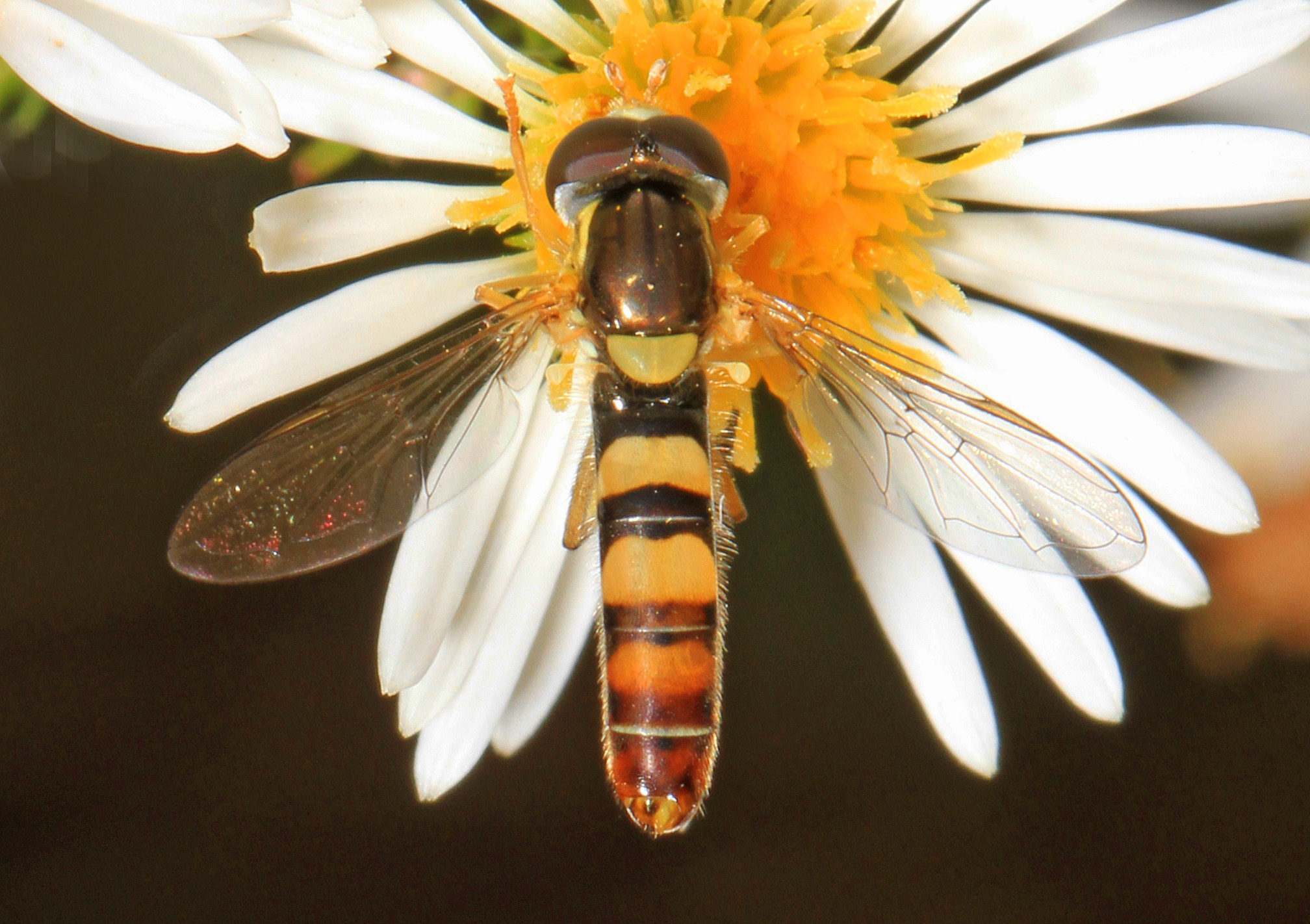

Scientific classification
- Domain: Eukaryota
- Kingdom: Animalia
- Phylum: Arthropoda
- Class: Insecta
- Order: Diptera
- Family: Syrphidae
- Genus: Sphaerophoria
- Species: S. contigua

Binomial name
- Sphaerophoria contigua Macquart, 1847

= Sphaerophoria contigua =

Species of fly

Sphaerophoria contigua is a species of syrphid fly in the family Syrphidae. It is a predator of aphids.

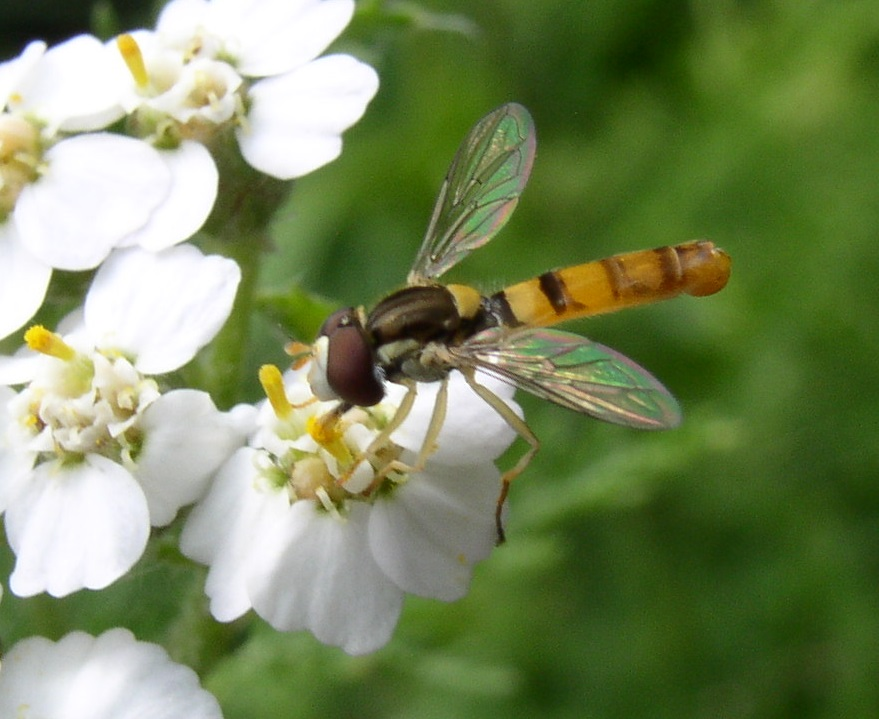
S. contigua, male
