= Sphaerophoria loewii =

Scientific classification
- Kingdom: Animalia
- Phylum: Arthropoda
- Class: Insecta
- Order: Diptera
- Family: Syrphidae
- Genus: Sphaerophoria
- Species: S. loewii

Binomial name
- Sphaerophoria loewii Zetterstedt, 1843

Synonyms
- Sphaerophoria loewi Auctt. (Missp.)

Species of fly

Sphaerophoria loewii is a Palearctic hoverfly. Identification is problematic and this species is little known.
