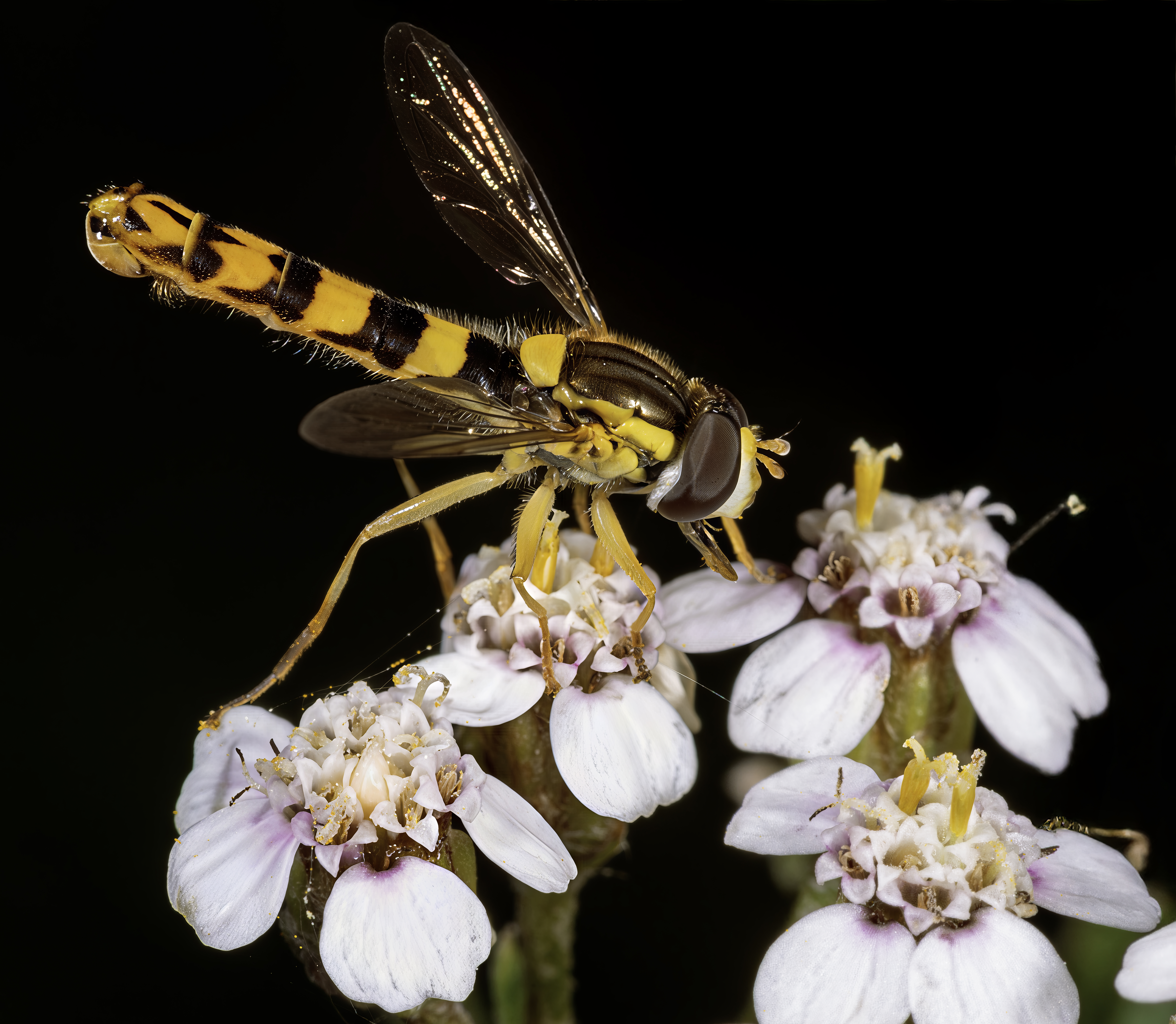
- Sphaerophoria scripta male

Scientific classification
- Kingdom: Animalia
- Phylum: Arthropoda
- Clade: Pancrustacea
- Class: Insecta
- Order: Diptera
- Family: Syrphidae
- Subfamily: Syrphinae
- Tribe: Syrphini
- Genus: Sphaerophoria; Le Peletier & Serville, 1828

Type species
- Musca scripta Linnaeus, 1758

Synonyms
- Melithreptus Loew, 1840; Melitrophus Haliday, 1856

= Sphaerophoria =

Genus of flies

Sphaerophoria is a genus of hoverflies. They occur worldwide but are common in North America, Europe, Asia and Australia, with over 70 described species.

== Description ==
Species slender 5.6-12mm long with extremely large hemispherical male terminalia, after which the common name globetail was created. There are bright yellow markings on head and thorax and usually on the abdomen but some species have a black abdomen.

The larvae--when known--are aphidophagous.

== Diagnostics ==
For terminology see Speight key to genera and glossary The male has a yellow frons, rarely with a pair of black spots above the antennae, while the female has a median black stripe. The face is usually yellow, often with black markings, and has a prominent tubercle that only recedes slightly to the lower facial margin. The eyes are bare. The scutum is glossy black with a wide yellow stripe that either terminates at the transverse suture or extends to the scutellum. The pleura have black coloring with bright yellow patterns. The anterior anepisternum is bare. The upper and lower katepisternal hair patches are distinct from each other, with the former usually extending ventrally in a triangular shape about three-quarters of the distance from the upper to lower margin of the sclerite. The meron and metapleuron are both devoid of hair, and the metasternum has some. There are small bare areas on the basal one-third of the wing membrane.

Males have an abdomen is that is slender, unmargined, and parallel-sided or slightly constricted near the middle. The fifth segment on the right side has a bluntly rounded posterior extension. Females have an abdomen that is parallel or slightly widened in the middle.

Male genitalia

The epandrium is typically very large, almost as wide as segment 5 and usually slightly longer than wide, with the posterior being slightly wider. The cerci are usually enclosed in a sclerotized layer of the epandrium. The surstylus is usually detailed and divided into three lobes. The dorsal lobe is slightly swollen at the top, round, and has a thick mass of long, coarse yellow hairs. The ventral lobe is flattened, sometimes elongate, and often split into two parts at the tip, with sparsely-haired but a densely setulose longitudinal ridge on its inner side.

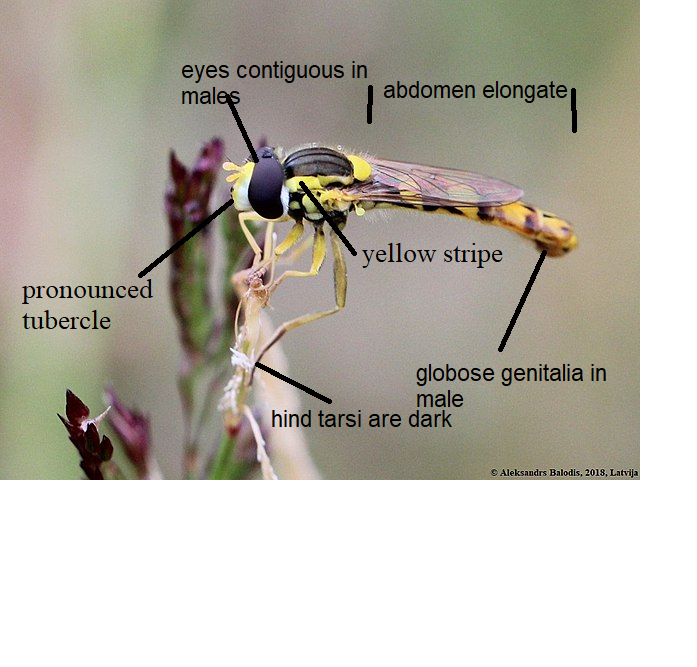
S. (species) parts

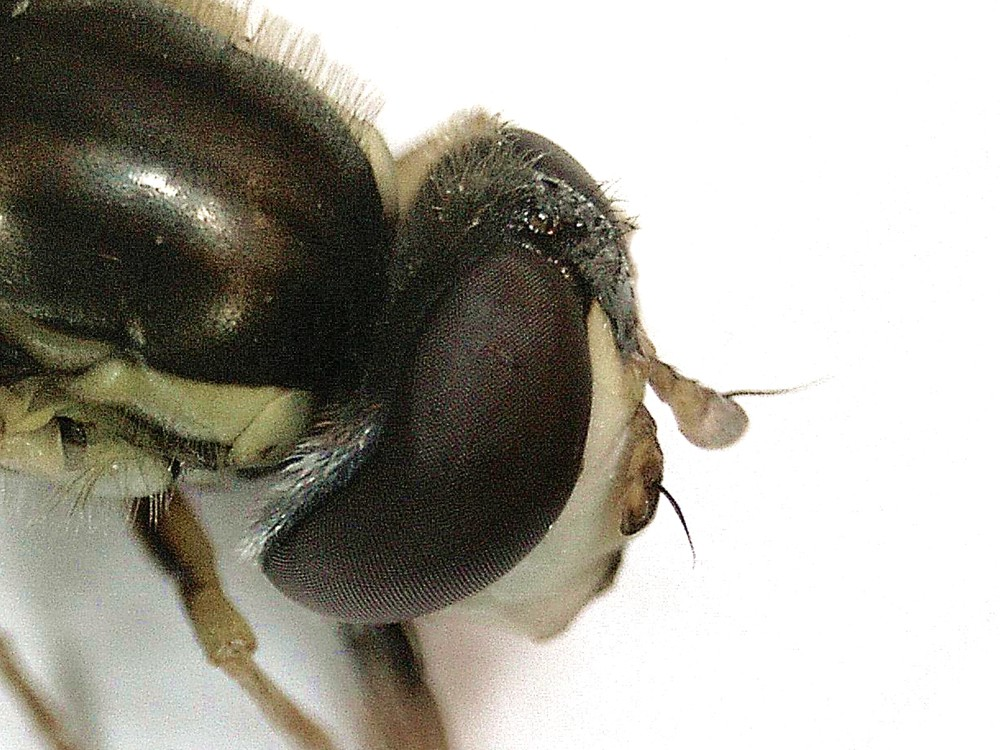
Female profile face

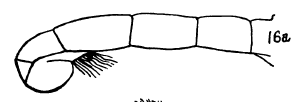
abdomen profile

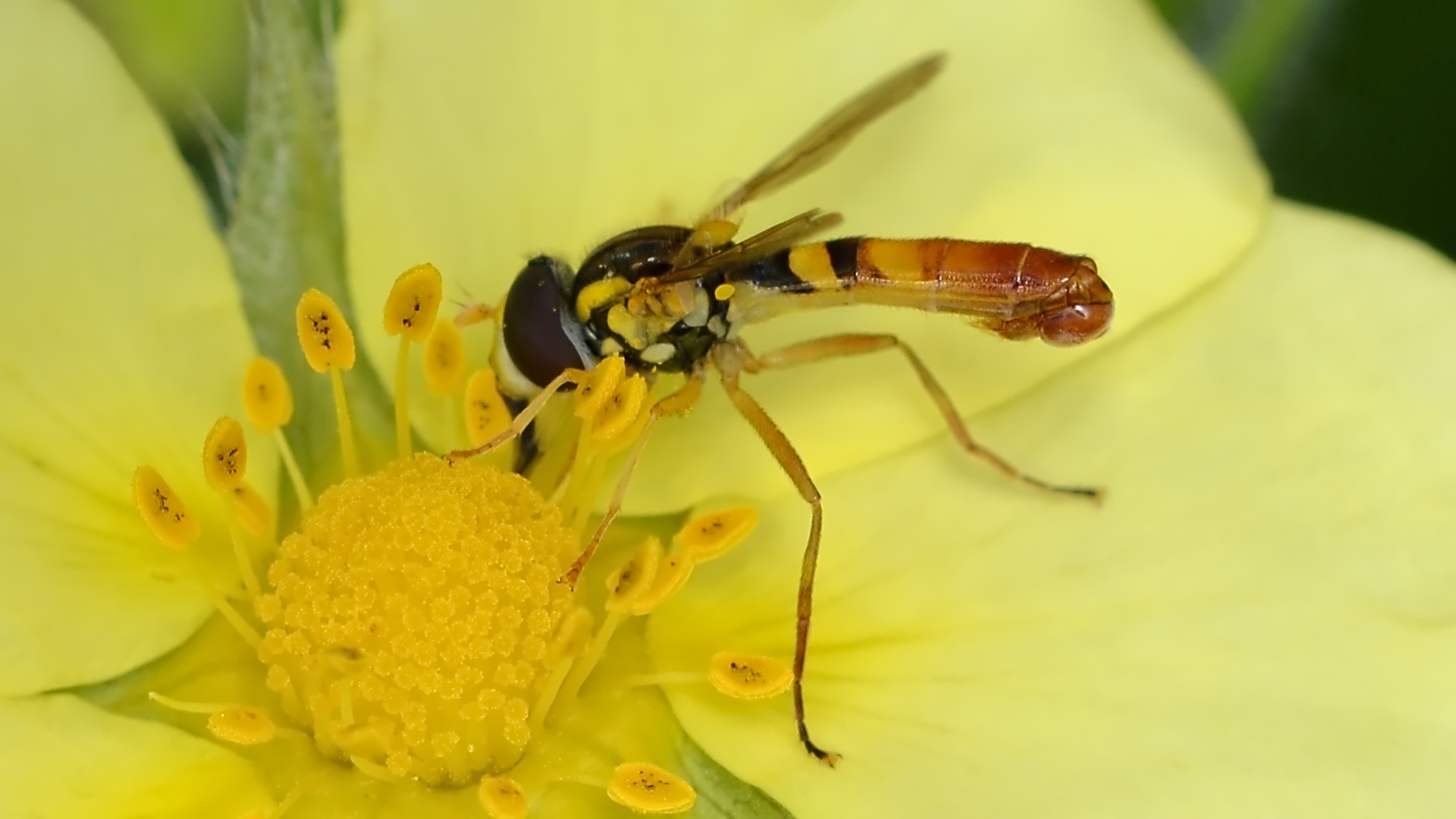
male abdomen

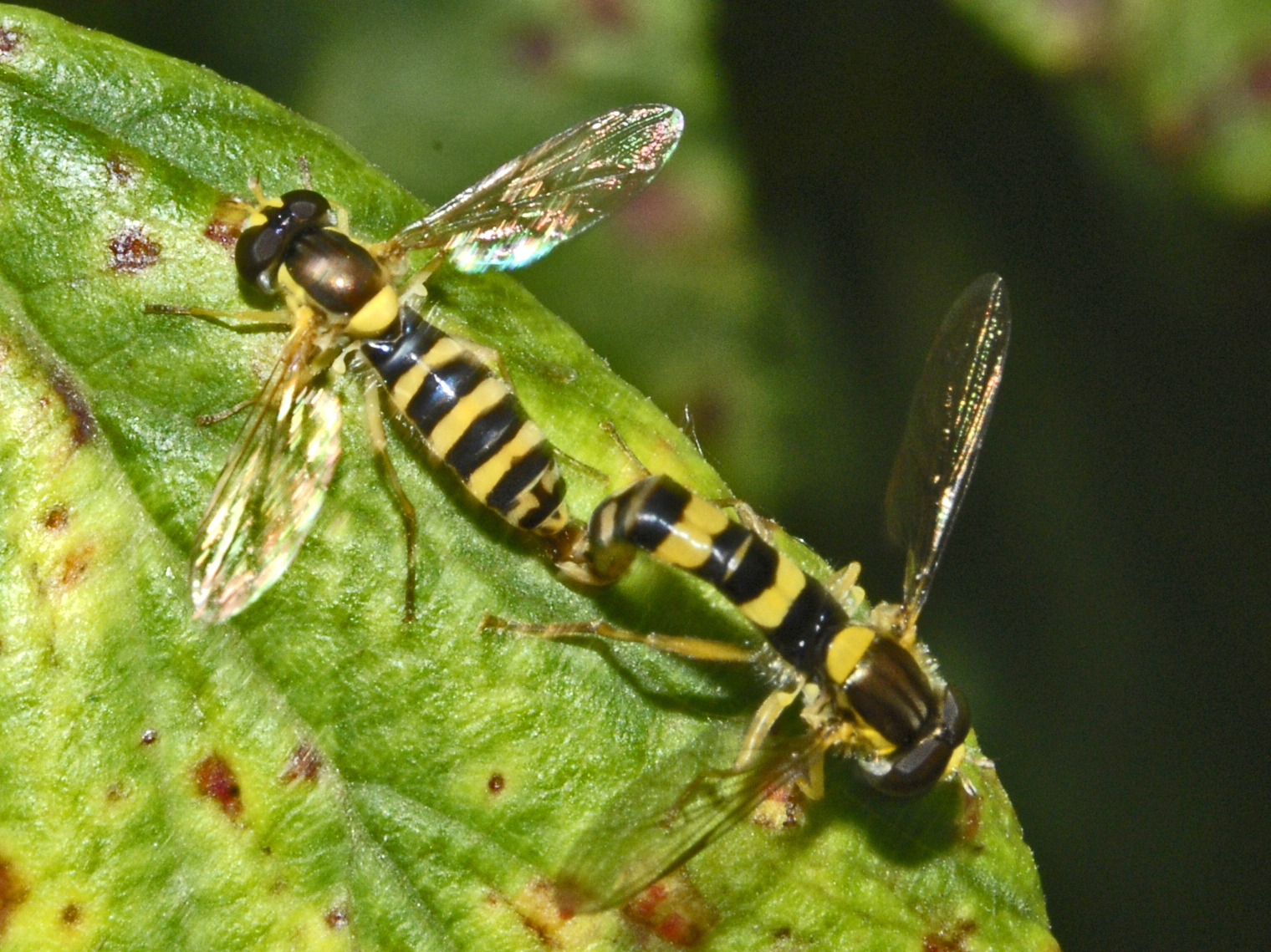
mating pair S. scripta (female at top left)

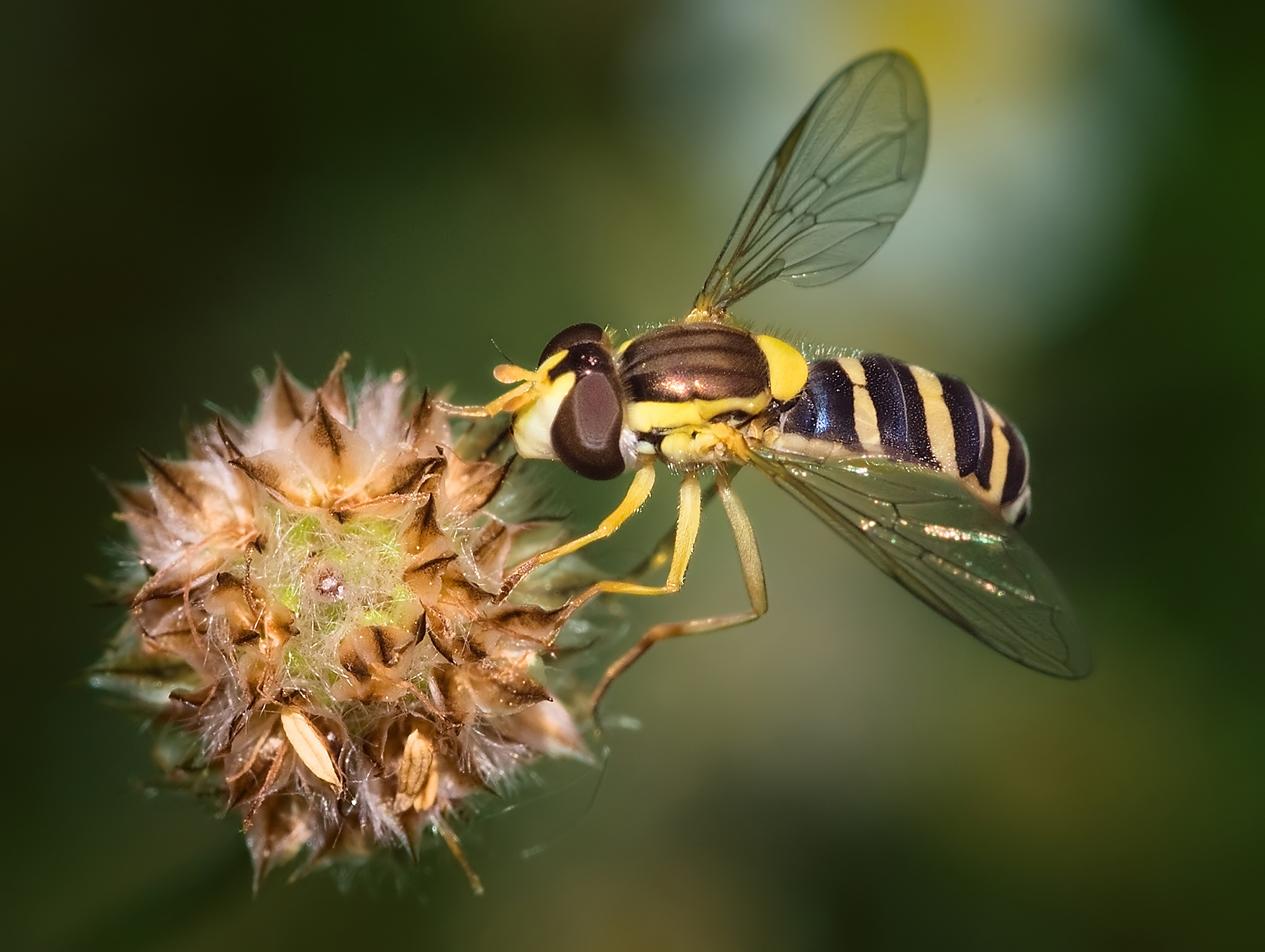
female S. scripta

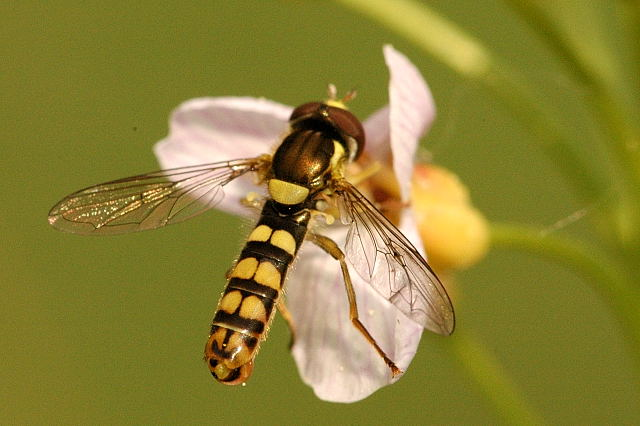
Male S. interrupta

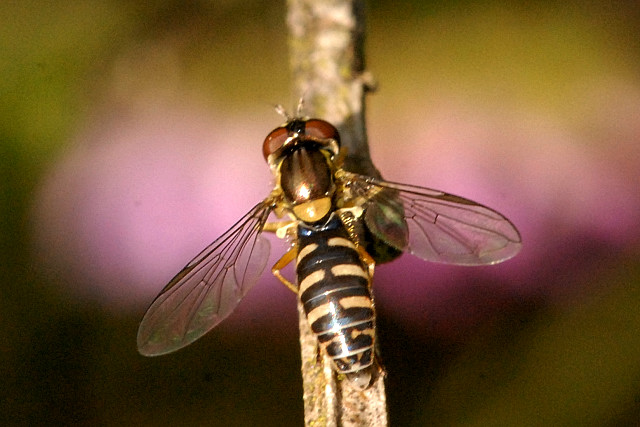
Female S. fatarum

== Species ==
=== Subgenus Exallandra ===
- Sphaerophoria cinctifacies (Speiser, 1910)
- Sphaerophoria loewii Zetterstedt, 1843

=== Subgenus Loveridgeana ===
- Sphaerophoria beattiei (Doesburg and Doesburg, 1977) Saint Helena, South Atlantic
- Sphaerophoria quadrituberculata Bezzi, 1915
- Sphaerophoria retrocurva Hull, 1944

=== Subgenus Sphaerophoria ===
- Sphaerophoria abbreviata Zetterstedt, 1849
- Sphaerophoria assamensis Joseph, 1970
- Sphaerophoria asymmetrica Knutson, 1973
- Sphaerophoria bankowskae Goeldlin, 1989
- Sphaerophoria batava Goeldlin, 1974
- Sphaerophoria bifurcata Knutson, 1972
- Sphaerophoria boreoalpina Goeldlin, 1989
- Sphaerophoria brevipilosa Knutson, 1972
- Sphaerophoria chongjini Bankowska, 1964
- Sphaerophoria cleoae Metcalf, 1917
- Sphaerophoria contigua Macquart, 1847
- Sphaerophoria cranbrookensis Curran, 1921
- Sphaerophoria estebani Goeldlin, 1991
- Sphaerophoria fatarum Goeldlin, 1989
- Sphaerophoria indiana Bigot, 1884
- Sphaerophoria infuscata Goeldlin, 1974
- Sphaerophoria interrupta (Fabricius, 1805)
- Sphaerophoria kaa Violovitsh, 1960
- Sphaerophoria laurae Goeldlin, 1989
- Sphaerophoria longipilosa Knutson, 1972
- Sphaerophoria macrogaster (Thomson, 1869)
- Sphaerophoria menthastri (Linnaeus, 1758)
- Sphaerophoria nigra Frey, 1945
- Sphaerophoria novaeangliae Johnson, 1916
- Sphaerophoria philanthus (Meigen, 1822)
- Sphaerophoria pictipes Boheman, 1863
- Sphaerophoria potentillae Claussen, 1984
- Sphaerophoria pyrrhina Bigot, 1884
- Sphaerophoria rueppellii (Wiedemann, 1830)
- Sphaerophoria scripta (Linnaeus, 1758)
- Sphaerophoria shirchan Violovitsh, 1957
- Sphaerophoria sulphuripes (Thomson, 1869)
- Sphaerophoria taeniata (Meigen, 1822)
- Sphaerophoria turkmenica Bankowska, 1964
- Sphaerophoria tuvinica Violovitsh, 1966
- Sphaerophoria virgata Goeldlin, 1974
- Sphaerophoria viridaenea Brunnetti, 1915
- Sphaerophoria weemsi Knutson, 1972
