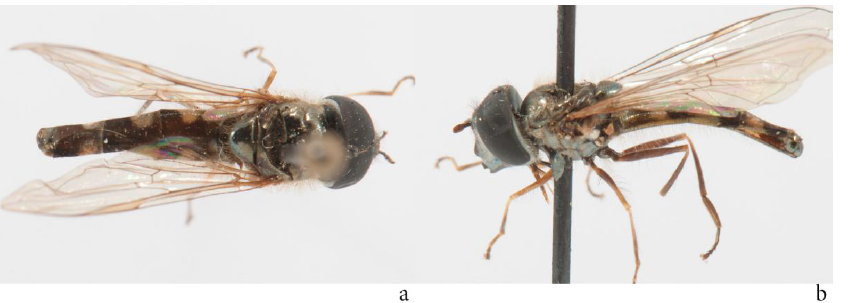
- Platycheirus clausseni male

Scientific classification
- Kingdom: Animalia
- Phylum: Arthropoda
- Clade: Pancrustacea
- Class: Insecta
- Order: Diptera
- Family: Syrphidae
- Genus: Platycheirus
- Species: P. clausseni

Binomial name
- Platycheirus clausseni (Peder Nielsen, 2004:)

= Platycheirus clausseni =

Species of hoverfly

Platycheirus clausseni, or Claussen's sedgesitter, is a fly in the family Syrphidae or hoverfly. It is distributed throughout the Alps, the Altai mountains in Siberia, and Colorado, United States.

== Description ==
For terminology see Speight key to genera and glossary or Glossary of morphological terminology Neilson (2004) provides a key to the species. Young provides a key images and description to the Nearctic north of Mexico species

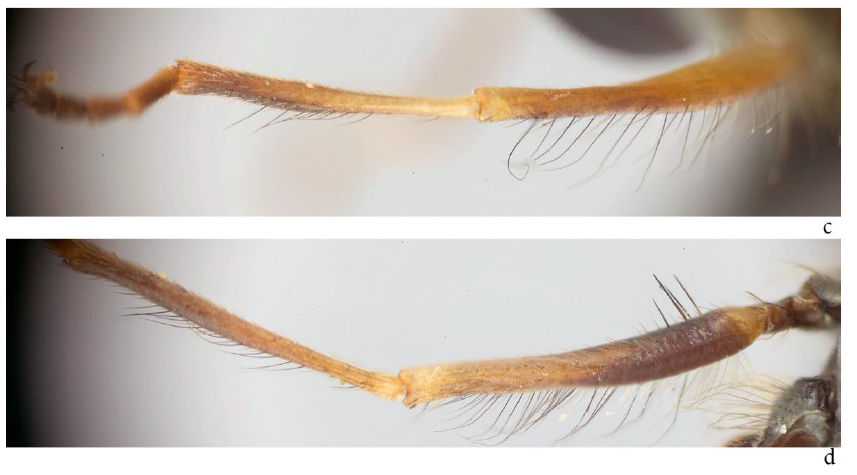
Platycheirus clausseni male front and middle legs

Size
8.2–9.6 mm (0.32–0.38 in)

The face is produced forward on the ventral half, with the facial tubercle and mouth-edge exhibiting a narrow black coloration. The entire thorax is covered with long yellowish hairs.

The legs: The fore femur is orange and features a regular row of 8-10 soft, slightly curved black posterior setae (thick hairs)( along its apical three-quarters, culminating in a single longer seta with a strongly curved tip. The posterior side of the fore femur is adorned with soft, hair-like bristles. The fore tibia has a few longer hairs on its posterior side, although none reach the end. The mid femur is either brown or black, with orange coloration only at the base and apex, and it possesses an irregular row of four strong black lower front setae on the basal third. The mid tibiae are characterized by a row of black somewhat appressed setae on the basal three-quarters, with setal length increasing towards the apex.(see leg diagram)

The wings are brown-tinted and microtrichose, except for the basal half of the second costal cell and the first and second basal cells. The haltere have a yellow knob.

The abdomen has spots on the tergites that are dull orange or grey, overlaid with silvery dusting and positioned away from the front margins.

Anatomy click to enlarge

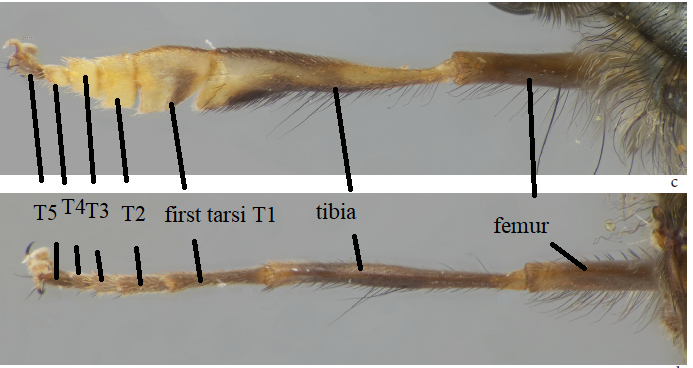
Legs

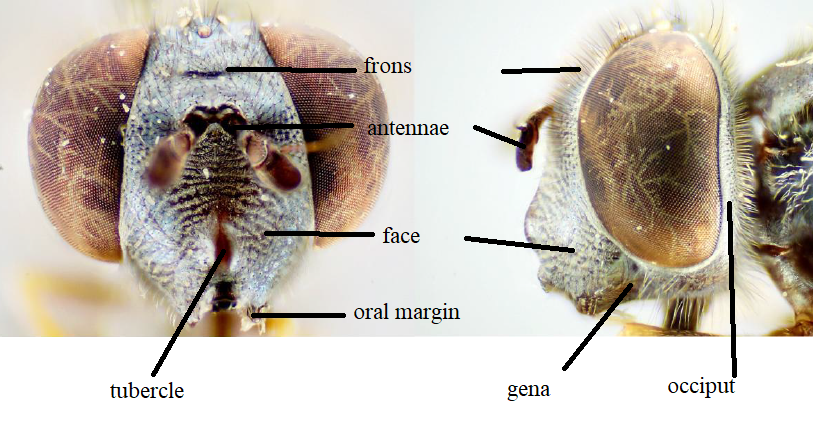
Head

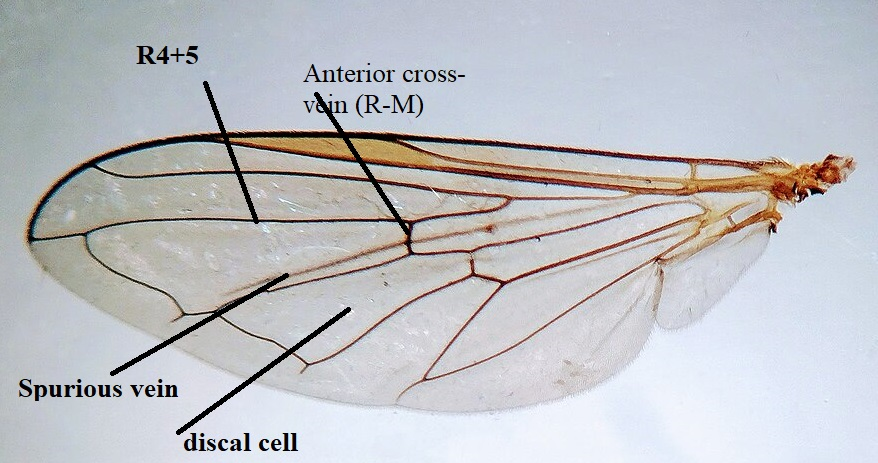
Wing

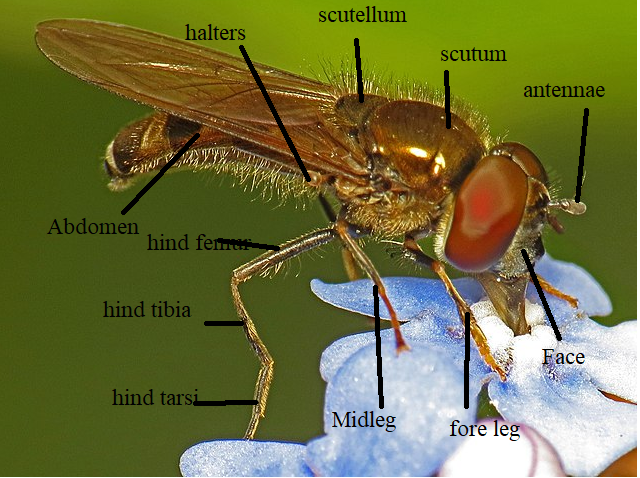
Bod

== Taxonomy ==
Platycheirus clausseni belongs to the family syrphidae distinguished by the spurious vein (see diagram). . The genus Platycheirus is characterized as being slender to somewhat oval, with a completely black head and thorax. The abdomen is usually black with distinct paired yellow to orange or spots while some species are almost completely black or mostly yellow or orange abdomen in . They range in length from 4.7–10.5 mm (0.19–0.41 in). P. clausseni belongs to the ambiguus group. The ambiguus group species ( brunnifrons, clausseni, coerulescens, kelloggi, lundbecki, altomontis, caesius, goeldlini, meridimontanus, subambiguus and transfugus) are medium-sized or small. They have slender legs, and the male has posteriorly on fore femur a row of straight normally black setae (thick hairs) or setae-like hairs, the last seta is longer and tail-like, with the tip strongly curved.
