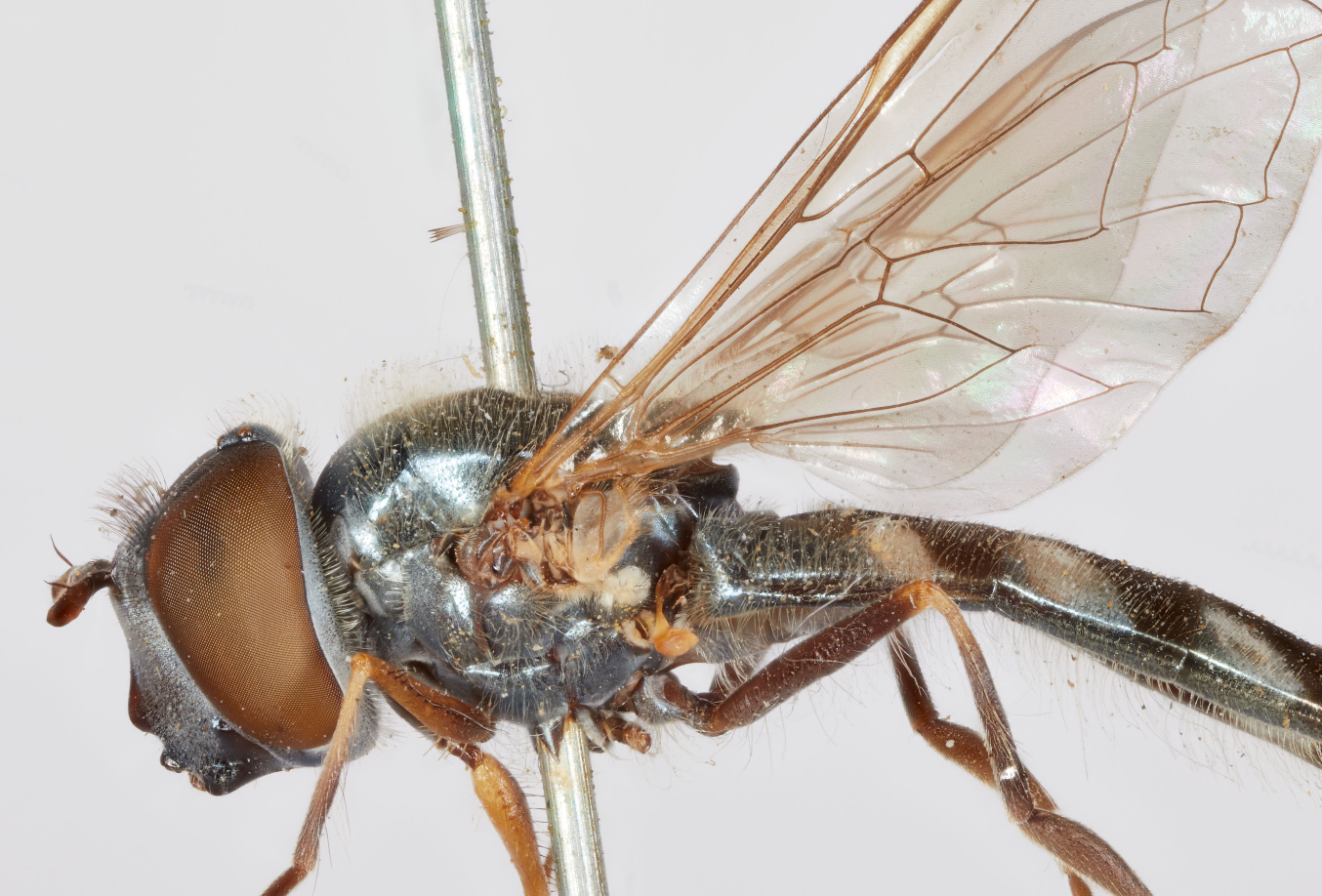

Scientific classification
- Kingdom: Animalia
- Phylum: Arthropoda
- Clade: Pancrustacea
- Class: Insecta
- Order: Diptera
- Family: Syrphidae
- Genus: Platycheirus
- Subgenus: Platycheirus
- Species: P. coerulescens

Binomial name
- Platycheirus coerulescens (Williston, 1887)
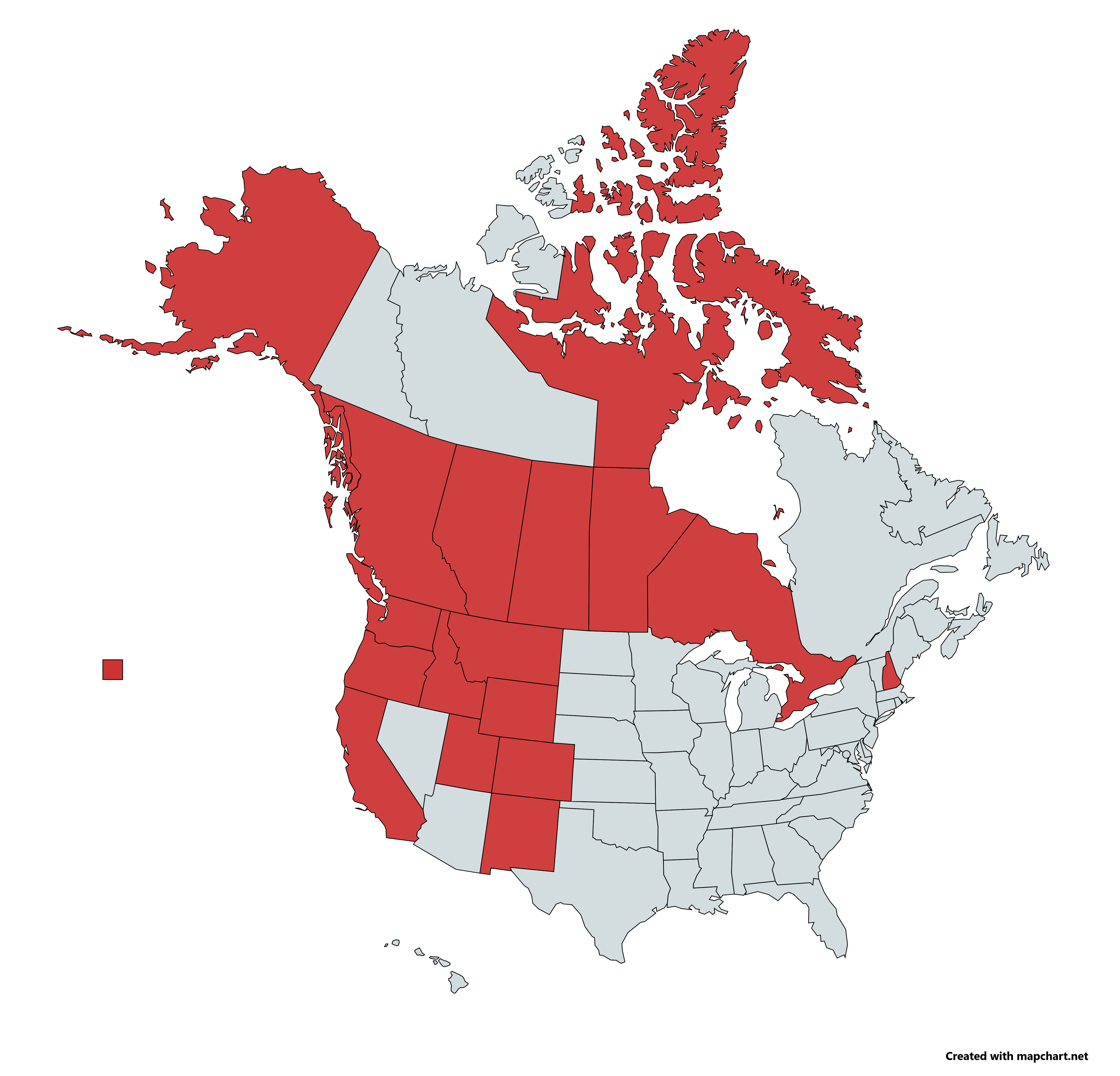
- Range map 2023

Synonyms
- Melanostoma coerulescens Williston, 1887

= Platycheirus coerulescens =

Species of fly

Platycheirus coerulescens, the hooked sedgesitter, is an uncommon species of syrphid fly in the family Syrphidae. It occurs throughout northern and western Canada and Alaska, south to California and Mexico at high altitudes

== Description ==
For terminology Speight key to genera and glossary

Size

6–9 mm (0.24–0.35 in)

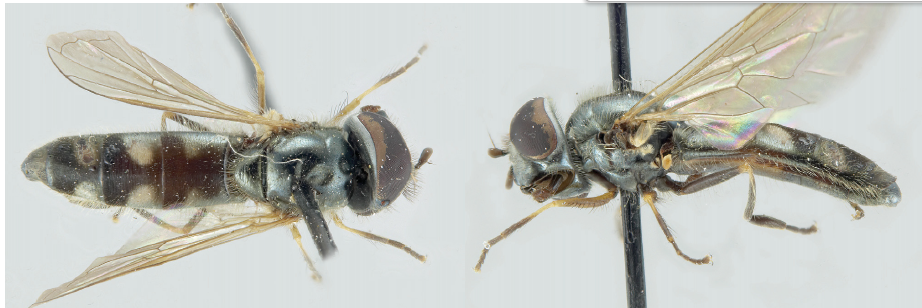
Platycheirus coerulescens male body

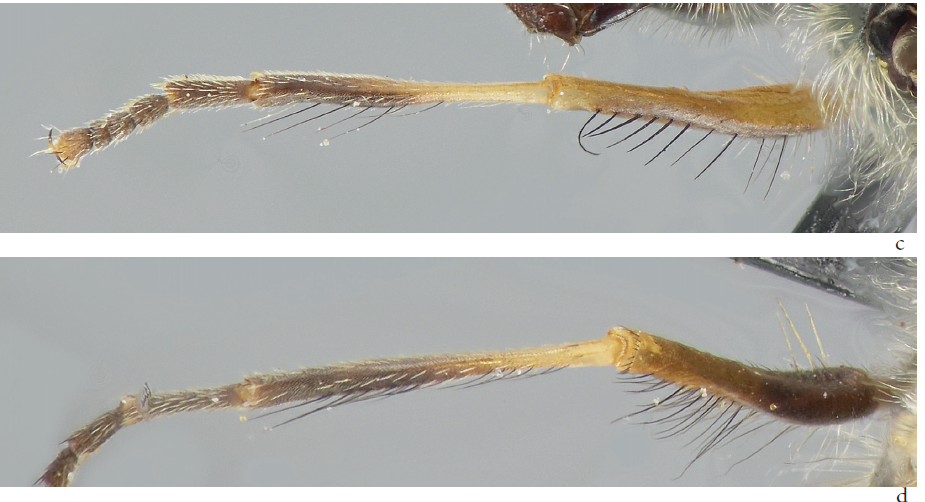
Platycheirus coerulescens male front and middle legs

The thoracic pile of the insect is completely white, while the fore and mid femurs are orange in color. On the apical part of the fore femurs, there is a row of 9-12 strong, straight, black posterior setae, which are approximately twice as long as the diameter of the femur; this row ends in a single longer seta with a strongly curved apex at the apex of the row. Additionally, there is a row of 3-5 strong yellow ventral setae on the basal third of the fore femur, and these setae are slightly shorter than the femoral diameter. On the basal third of the mid femur, there is a row of 2-5 long strong, yellow or black anteroventral setae, and the longest of these setae is approximately twice the femoral diameter. The wings are mostly bare on the basal half. The spots of the tergites are orange, dull yellow, or entirely grey, and they are always overlaid with strong silvery pollinosity.

General Anatomy click to enlarge

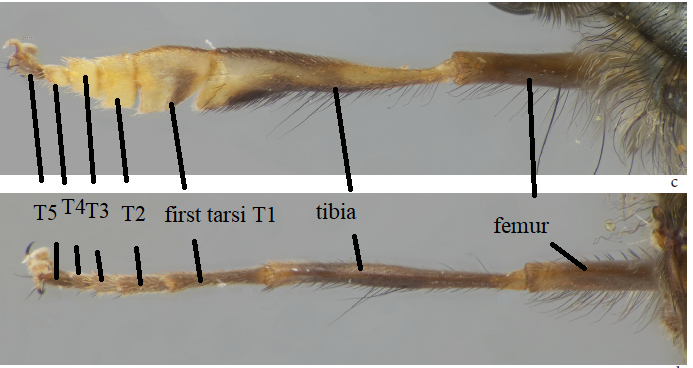
Legs

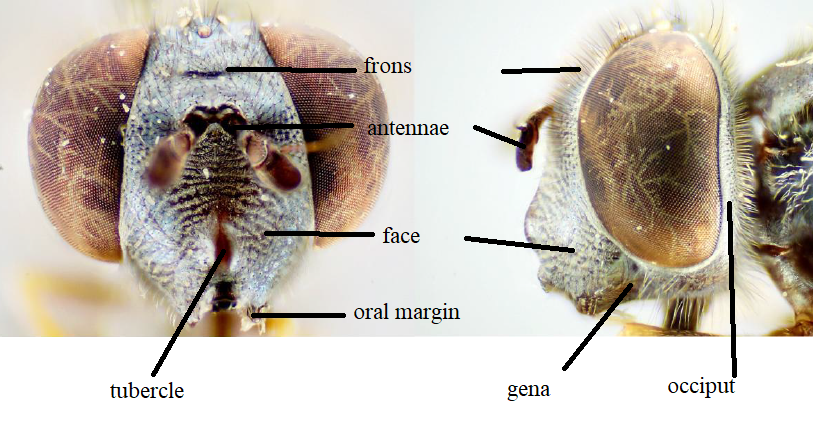
Head

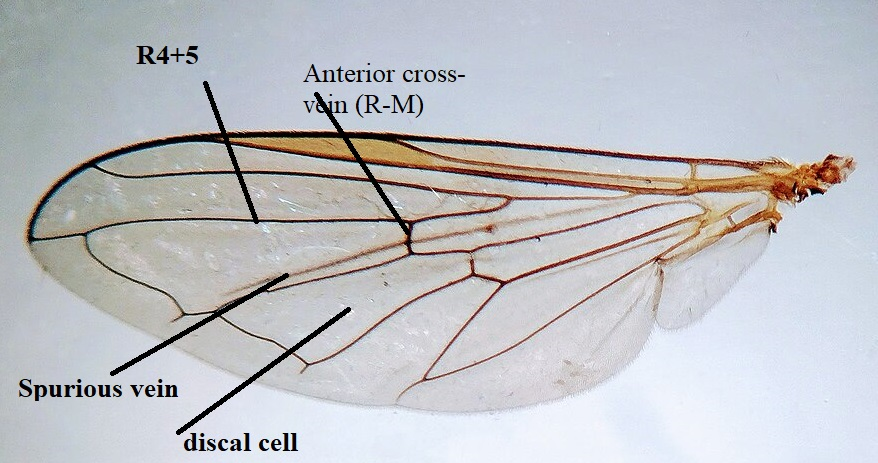
Wing

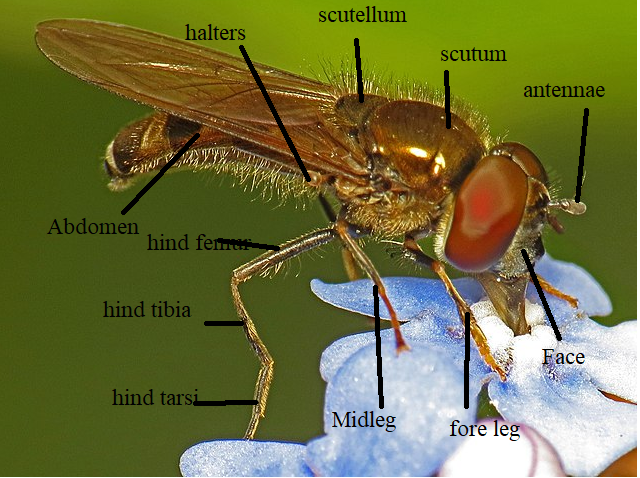
Bod

== Taxonomy ==
Platycheirus coerulescens belongs to the family syrphidae distinguished by the spurious vein.

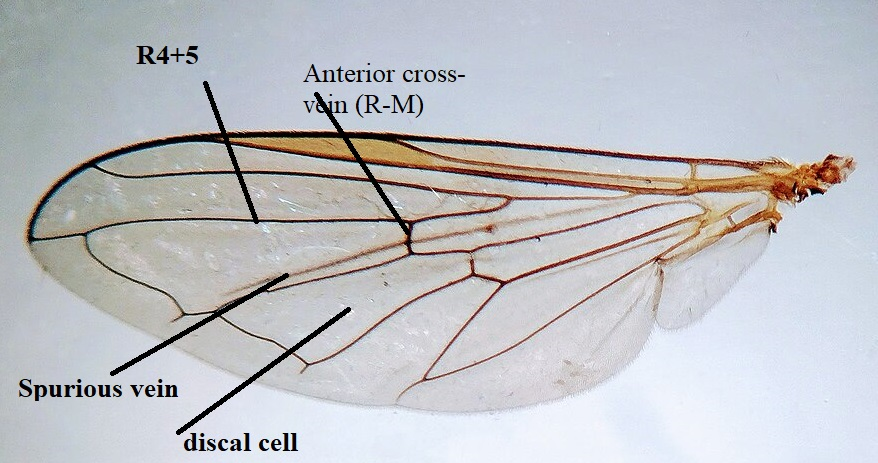
Platycheirus wing.

The genus Platycheirus is characterized as being slender to somewhat oval, with a completely black head and thorax. The abdomen is usually black with distinct paired yellow to orange or spots while some species are almost completely black or mostly yellow or orange abdomen in. They range in length from 4.7–10.5 mm (0.19–0.41 in).

P. coerulescens belongs to the ambiguus group.The ambiguus group species (brunnifrons, P. clausseni, P.coerulescens, kelloggi, lundbecki, altomontis, caesius, goeldlini, meridimontanus, subambiguus and transfugus) are medium sized or small. They have slender legs, and the male has posteriorly on fore femur a row of straight normally black setae or setae-like hairs, the last seta is longer and tail-like, with the tip strongly curved.
