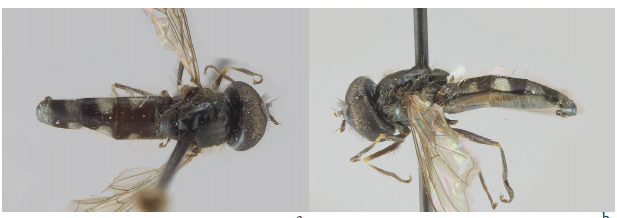
- Male

Scientific classification
- Kingdom: Animalia
- Phylum: Arthropoda
- Clade: Pancrustacea
- Class: Insecta
- Order: Diptera
- Family: Syrphidae
- Genus: Platycheirus
- Species: P. lundbecki

Binomial name
- Platycheirus lundbecki (Collin, 1931 )

Synonyms
- Melanostoma lundbecki (Collin, 1931 ); Melanostoma lundbecki (Peder Nielsen, 1974 ); Platycheirus fjellbergi Nielsen, 1974

= Platycheirus lundbecki =

Species of fly

Platycheirus lundbecki, or as Lundbeck's sedgesitter, is a species of fly in the family Syrphidae. It is Subarctic, found in northern Europe: Norway, Sweden, Finland, Siberia; Greenland; in North America from Alaska and northern Canada. Larvae are unknown.

== Determination ==
- Nielsen (2014), the ambiguus group key
- Vockeroth (1992), Key to Canadian species
- Young(2016), Canada, Key to Canadian sp. with images maps
- van Veen (2004), European key

== Description ==
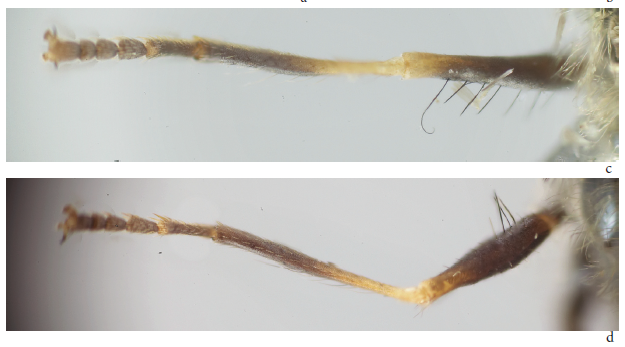
P. lundbecki male legs Figure 1 from Andrew Young

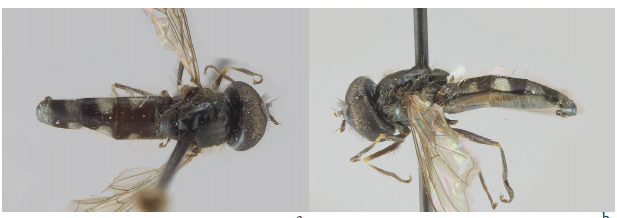
P. lundbecki male Figure 2 from Andrew Young

For terminology see Speight key to genera and glossary or Glossary of morphological terminology.

=== Thorax ===
The thorax of P. lundbecki has either brown or black pile . In contrast, P. coerulescens features an entirely white thoracic pile. The scutum and scutellum of these species are typically black, although they may appear slightly dulled by a greyish-yellow powder. The pile on the center of the scutum has the longest setae approximately 1.5 times as long as the width of the front femur. The remaining thoracic pile is equal in length to that of the scutum.

=== Legs ===
The legs are mostly black or brown, with orange present at the tip of the femur and the base of the tibia. The front femur has only yellow ventral setae. The apical three-quarters of the front femur have a regular row of 9-12 strong, straight white or black posterior setae, which are approximately 1.5 times as long as the femoral width. This row ends in a single longer seta with a moderately curved tip. (figure 1 above and Figure 2 right) The apical half of the front tibia has a few rather long, black bristles, with the last bristle reaching the apex of the tibia. Both the front and middle tibia have a row of 3-6 weak, low-lying rear setae on the apical half, with the longest setae being approximately twice the diameter of the tibia. The first tarsomere of the front leg is black. The middle femur has three thick black setae at the front base, along with two yellow back basal setae and a black front seta. The middle tibia is mostly brown with orange near the femur and with a black stripe anteriorly and a black apex dorsally. Additionally, the middle tibia has a row of 3-6 faint low-lying back setae on the forward half, with the longest setae being about twice the width of the tibia. (figure 1 bottom).

=== Abdomen ===
The segment spots of Lundbecki are completely grey, although Neilsen describes them as bluish. The segments themselves are dark and feature powdery spots. In segment 2, the spots may be obscured or entirely missing; if they are present, they are typically located just beyond the midpoint of the segment and may sometimes extend to the lateral and anterior edges. For segments 3 and 4, the spots reach both the anterior and lateral edges, and they occasionally touch medially. Segments 1 and 5 are characterized by a black coloration. (see figure 2).

General Anatomy click to enlarge

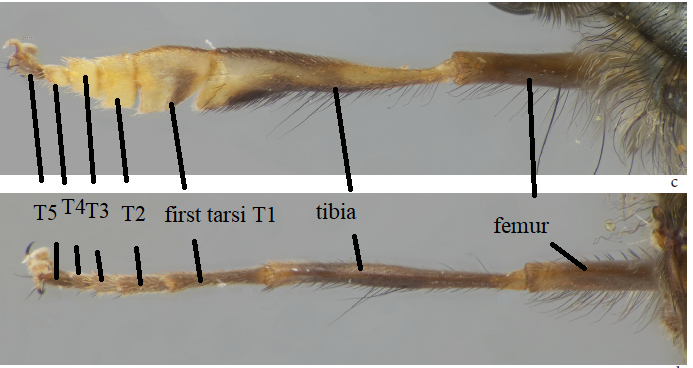
Legs

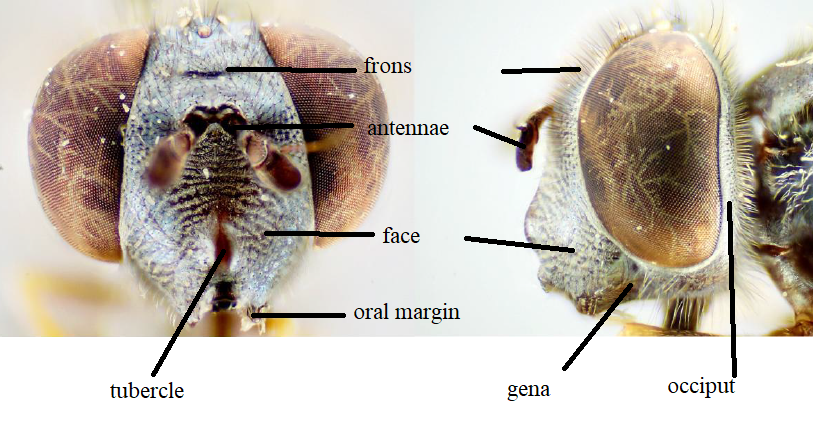
Head

Wing

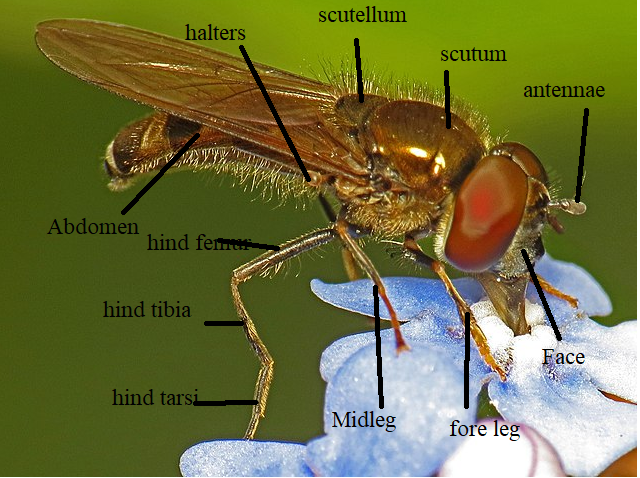
Body
