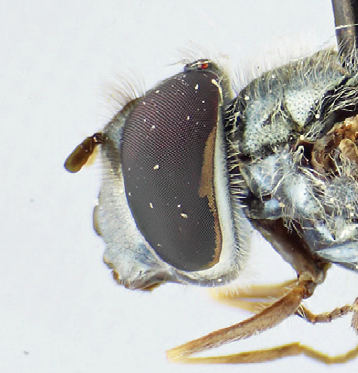
- Platycheirus brunnifrons head profile

Scientific classification
- Kingdom: Animalia
- Phylum: Arthropoda
- Clade: Pancrustacea
- Class: Insecta
- Order: Diptera
- Family: Syrphidae
- Genus: Platycheirus
- Species: P. brunnifrons

Binomial name
- Platycheirus brunnifrons (Nielsen, 2004 )

= Platycheirus brunnifrons =

Species of fly

Platycheirus brunnifrons, the copperhead sedgesitter, is a hoverfly found in high-altitude localities in Finland, Austria, France, Switzerland, Spain, Macedonia, Northeast Russia, and Alaska. Its larvae have not been identified. Adults primarily feed on the pollen and nectar of willows.

== Description ==
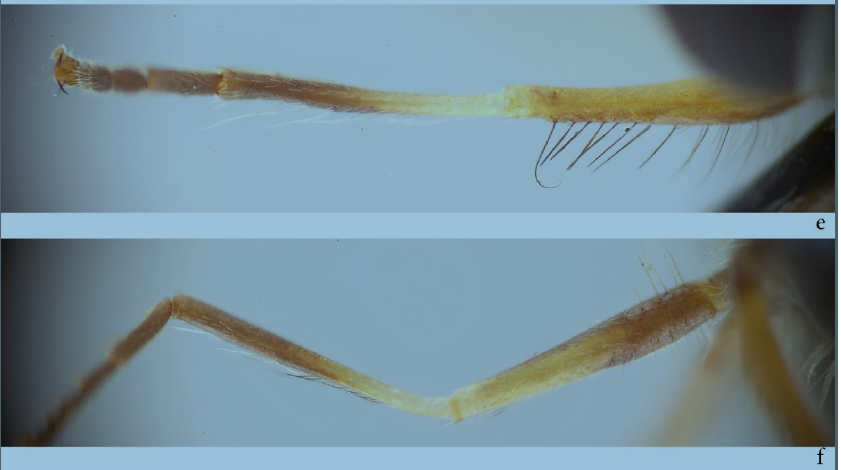
P. brunnifrons male legs front and middle legs

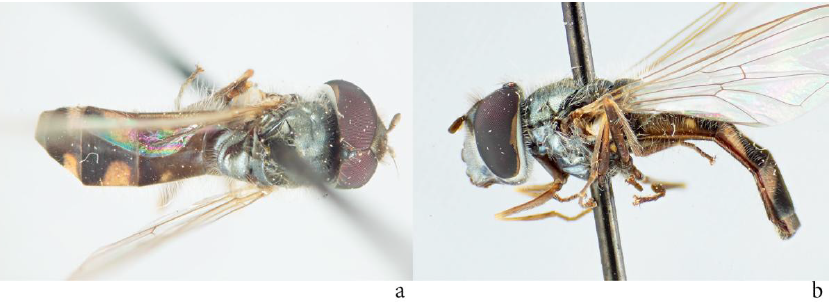
P. brunnifrons male

The body length of P. brunnifrons is 7.1–9.4 mm (0.28–0.37 in) and its wings are 6.2–7.7 mm (0.24–0.30 in) long.

=== Head and thorax ===
The frons on the head is black at the base and features brown pruinosity (powder-like pigmentation) that contrasts with the grey-white pruinosity of the rest of the head. The hairs on the frons are dark brown. The antennae are black, with a dark brown third segment and reddish-brown base. The face is shiny, bluish or greyish-black, adorned with silver grey dusting. The hairs on the face are brown. The facial tubercle and mouth-edge shine black and undusted. The genae are lightly dulled by whitish dusting. In contrast, the occiput is heavily dulled by whitish dusting and features white hairs, except for a few bristly hairs on the dorsal part. The ocellar triangle is either black or bluish-black, with black hairs in the front and yellowish white hairs on the hind part.

On the thorax, the scutum and scutellum shine bluish or greyish black and feature light grey or brownish pruinosity. The pleurae are bluish-black or black, with light silvery pruinosity. Yellowish metallic reflections may be present. The pile on the pleurae is yellow-white.

=== Legs ===
The fore femur is yellow-brown and darkened at the base and along the underside. The apical half has a regular row of 6–10 strong, straight, black posterior setae. These setae are approximately twice as long as the femoral diameter and end in a single longer seta with a strongly curved apex. The fore tibia is dark grey on the apical half. On the postero-lateral side of the apical half, there is a row of about six soft, tilted bristles; the longest bristle potentially reaches beyond the apex of the tibia.

The mid femur is yellow-brown and darkened at the base and along the underside. It has long black hairs postero-laterally, which are not longer than the maximum thickness of the femur. The basal half of the mid femur is orange. The mid tibia is dark grey on the apical half. This same part has 2–3 tilted, soft, and rather long bristles, with the longest reaching the apex of the tibia.

The hind femur is brownish black with a narrow, yellow apex. The hind tibia is dark except for the basal third. The hind basitarsus is less swollen and slightly thicker (1.2 times thicker) than the tibia at its apex. The tarsi are greyish-black.

=== Wings ===
The wings are microtrichose (i.e., they have small, irregularly scattered hairs) except for first and second basal cells, which are mainly bare. The halteres are light yellow-brown.

=== Abdomen ===
The abdomen is slightly shiny and has a black or brownish-black ground color. It has 2–4 small tergites, light brown-orange spots, and light silvery-white pruinosity.
