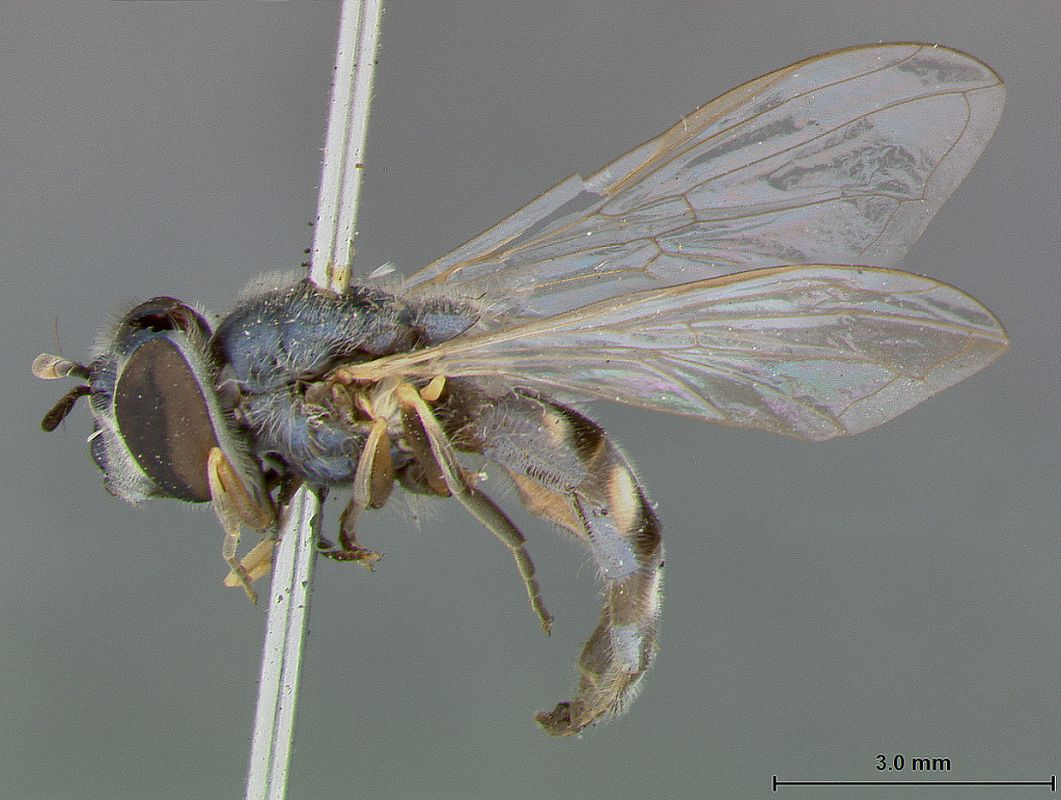

Scientific classification
- Kingdom: Animalia
- Phylum: Arthropoda
- Clade: Pancrustacea
- Class: Insecta
- Order: Diptera
- Family: Syrphidae
- Genus: Platycheirus
- Subgenus: Platycheirus
- Species: P. kelloggi

Binomial name
- Platycheirus kelloggi (Snow, 1895)

Synonyms
- Melanostoma johnsoni Jones, 1917; Melanostoma kelloggi Snow, 1895; Melanostoma monticola Jones, 1917

= Platycheirus kelloggi =

Species of fly

Platycheirus kelloggi, the broad-bodied sedgesiter, is a species of fly in the family Syrphidae . It is a rare species found in the USA from Alaska south to southern California and in the Rocky Mountains and Canada.

== Description male ==
For terminology see Speight key to genera and glossary or Glossary of morphological terminology

Note
See "general anatomy" below for diagrams of Syrphid parts(not this species)

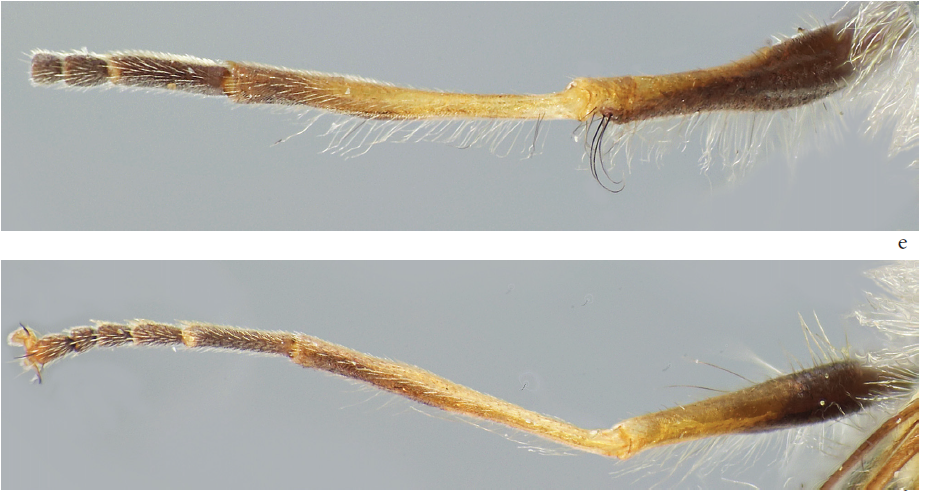
Figure 1 P. kelloggi male leg front above By Andrew Young

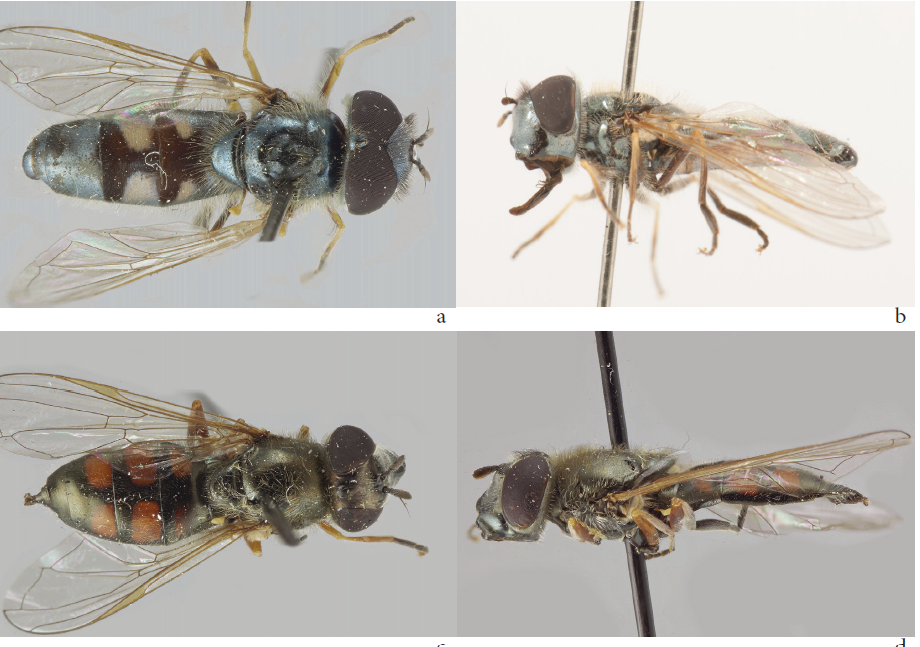
Figure 2 P. kelloggi male above by Andrew Young

Figure 3. Syrphidae wing veins Giancarlo Dessì

Head

The face is lightly dusted gray and features a small, shiny tubercle. The frons is covered with dense, relatively long hairs. The antennae are mostly black, except for the first flagellomere, which is orange below.

Thorax
The scutum and scutellum are mostly shining and covered with long white or yellowish hairs. The sides of the thorax have a very slight grey dusting and are also covered with long white or yellowish hairs.

Wings
Cell c is bare on its basal third to three-quarters. Cell bm is bare except at the tip and along the front half of the rear margin, The knob of the halter is yellow in color. (see figure 3)
Abdomen
The abdomen is oval. The spots on the segments are a dull orange color and are covered with a strong layer of pollen. The spots on segment 2 are located near the middle of the segment, while the spots on segments 3 and 4 extend to the anterior edge of each segment. (see figure 2).
Legs
The front femur is orange and features a blackish stripe along with long, fine, dense hairs that are mostly pale. These hairs become slightly shorter toward the apex and are covered by two or three longer, stronger black hairs that have strongly curved ends. The front tibia is orange as well, with its apical quarter occasionally appearing slightly brownish. It is adorned with many fine pale hairs that can be up to twice the width of the tibia. The front tarsus is simple, displaying a dark brown to black color on the upper side with very short hairs, while the fifth tarsomere is typically orange. The middle femur is orange, with a narrow black section on the posterior surface at the base. This femur is covered with irregular rows of strong, stiff hairs that can be white or black. The hairs near the base are nearly as long as the width of the femur. The middle tibia has short hairs and is orange, with the apical quarter being slightly brownish in some specimens. The middle tarsus appears dark brown to black on the upper side, with the fifth tarsomere usually being orange and covered in short hairs.(see figure 1 front leg above, mid leg below)

General Anatomy, click to enlarge

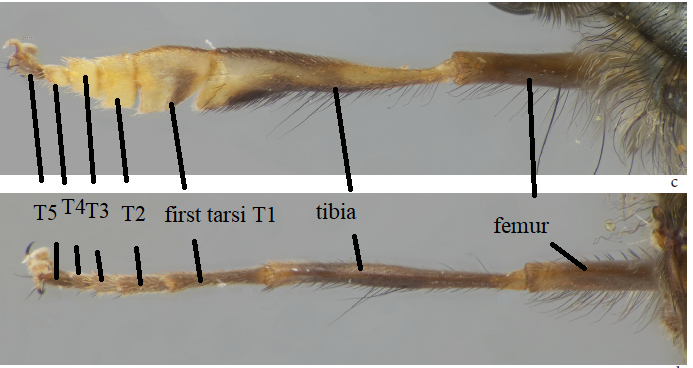
Legs

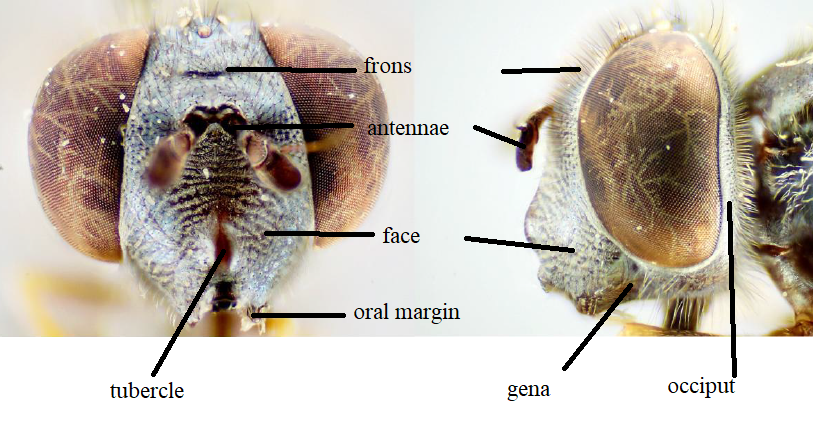
Head

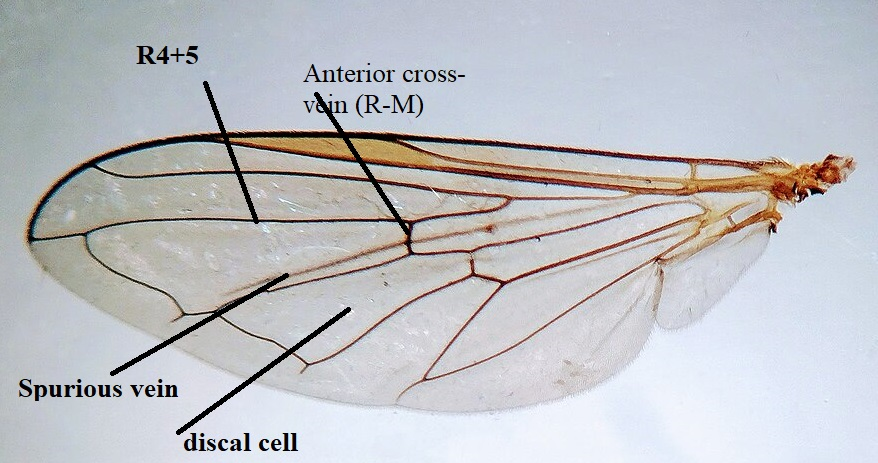
Wing

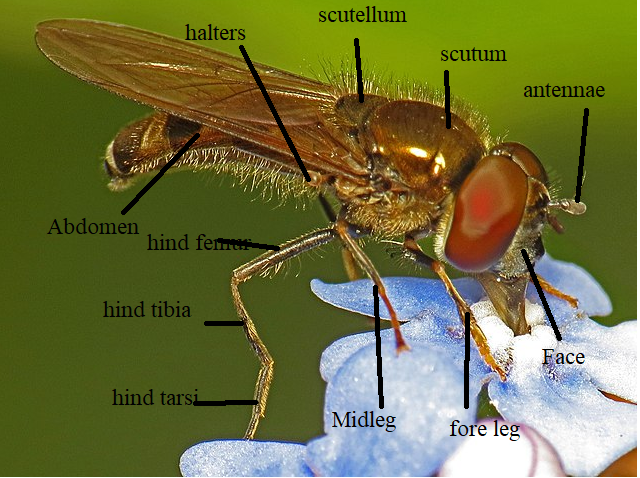
Body
