= Peder Nielsen =

Danish librarian and entomologist

Peder Nielsen (1 February 1893 – 16 March 1975) was a Danish librarian and entomologist who specialised in the order Diptera especially Nematocera.

Peder Kristian Nielsen was born at Silkeborg, Denmark. He received training at the Statens Bogsamlingskomité in Copenhagen and in 1917, he became an assistant at Silkeborg library. Over his more than 40-year career, he came to influence the development in the local library system. Peder Nielsen resigned as library manager in 1958.

In the field of entomology, he studied mosquitoes, crane flies, gnats and fungal mosquitoes. His crane fly (stankelben) collection and other two-wing insects were given to the University of Copenhagen Zoological Museum.

== Selected works ==
- Nielsen, P. 1925. Stankelben. Danmarks Fauna 28: 1-165.
- Nielsen, P. 1929. Contributions to the knowledge of the Palaearctic Tipulidae. Notulae Entomologicae 9: 48-50.
- Nielsen, P. 1961. Ergebnisse der Deutschen Afghanistan-Expedition 1956 der Landessammlungen fur Naturkunde Karlsruhe, Limoniidae (Diptera, Nematocera). Beitrage zur Naturkundlichen Forschung in Sudwestdeutschland 19: 305-307.
- Nielsen, P. 1961 Tipulidae from the Azores and Madeira. Commentationes Biologicae 24(2): 1-7.
- Nielsen, P. 1962. The 3rd Danish expedition to central Asia. Zoological results 30. Nematocera (Insecta) from Afghanistan. Videnskabelige Meddelelser fra Dansk Naturhistorisk Forening i Kjobenhavn 124: 165-169.
- Nielsen, P. 1967. Limoniidae. In: Illies, J. (ed.), Limnofauna Europaea, Ed. 1. Gustav Fischer Verlag, Stuttgart: 321-324.
- Nielsen, P.; Ringdahl, O.; Tuxen, S.T. 1954. Diptera, 1 (exclusive of Ceratopogonidae and Chironomidae). Zoology of Iceland 3 (48A): 1-189.
