= Platycheirus groenlandicus =

Scientific classification
- Kingdom: Animalia
- Phylum: Arthropoda
- Clade: Pancrustacea
- Class: Insecta
- Order: Diptera
- Family: Syrphidae
- Genus: Platycheirus
- Species: P. groenlandicus

Binomial name
- Platycheirus groenlandicus (Curran, 1927)

Synonyms
- Platycheirus boreomonatus (Peder Nielsen, 1981); Platychirus monticolus (Peder Nielsen, 1972)

Species of fly

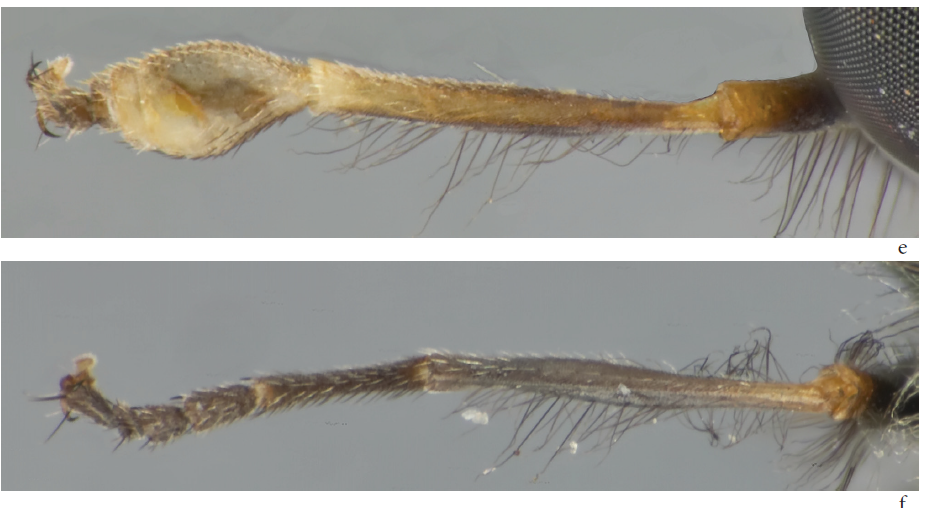
Legs front above

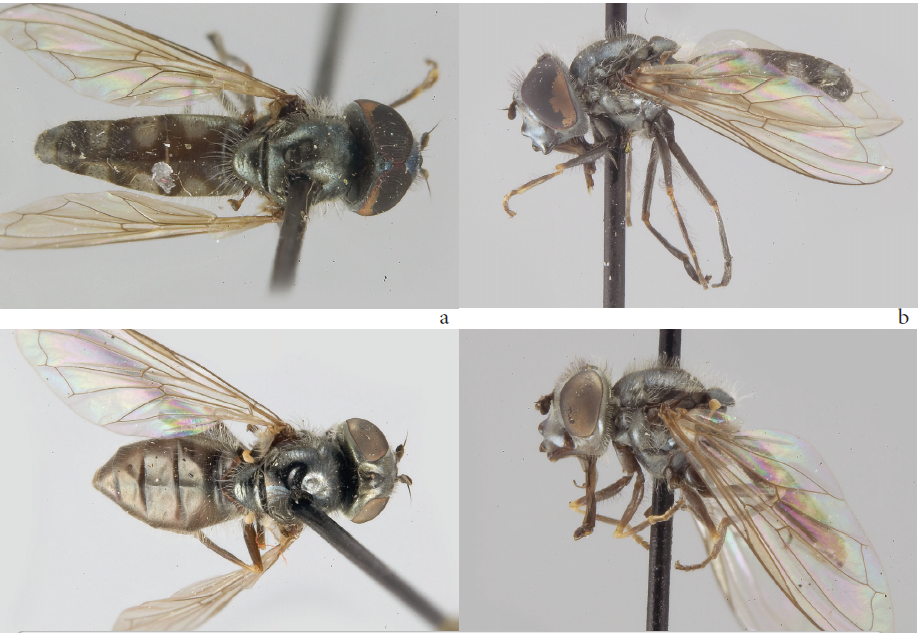
Male above female

Platycheirus groenlandicus, the arctic sedgesitter, is a species in the hoverfly family. Its range is Subarctic (Alaska, Western USA (Rocky Mountains) northern and western Canada, arctic and alpine Greenland, in mountains and northern parts of Fennoscandia, and Siberia. It is a small black hoverfly with silver abdominal spots. The basal tarsomeres of the front legs are yellow and strongly flattened. P. groenlandicus is similar to Platycheirus flabella, which has a narrower front basitarsus.

== Description ==
=== Size ===
5.7–8.2 mm (0.22–0.32 in)

=== Head ===
The face is densely gray-powdered, with a prominent shiny black tubercle. It is strongly produced ventrally, and the anterior oral margin extends forward almost to the level of the tubercle. The antenna is dark, with the arista distinctly thickened on the basal half.

=== Thorax ===
The thorax is black to bluish-black and is slightly and evenly gray-powdered. The hair on the thorax is light and long on the scutellum.

=== Abdomen ===
The abdomen is matte black. Tergite 2 features silver-powdered spots located in the middle, which can be either completely round or have a rounded front edge with a straight back. Tergites 3 and 4 feature diamond-shaped silver-powdered spots positioned just behind the front edge, occupying about one-third of the length of each tergite.

=== Legs ===
The front femora are dark with a yellow tip and have long brown hair on the back. The front tibiae are mostly yellow, slightly widening at the tip, and feature broad black areas in the middle on the back. The front tarsus has two light yellow basal segments (T1 and T2) that are broadly flattened. The first segment is more than twice as wide as the tip of the tibia and about twice as long as it is wide. The second segment is as wide as the tip of the first but only a quarter of its length. The middle segment (T3) is also yellow and slightly narrower than the second but remains flattened. The remaining segments of the front tarsi are normally shaped, brown-black, and the same length as the middle segment. The basal tarsus of the hind leg is swollen, almost twice as thick as the tibia.The mid tibia has a tuft of long wavy hairs on lower basal third.

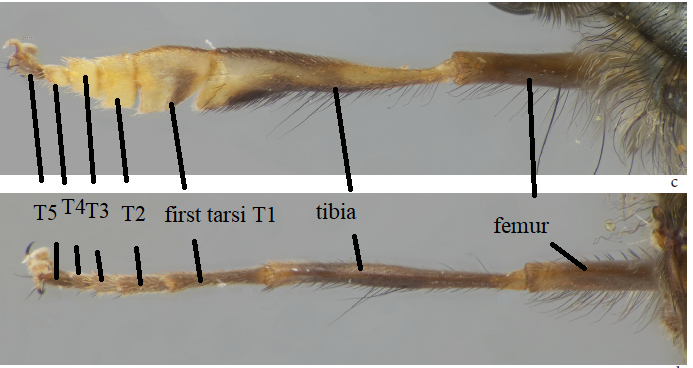
Legs

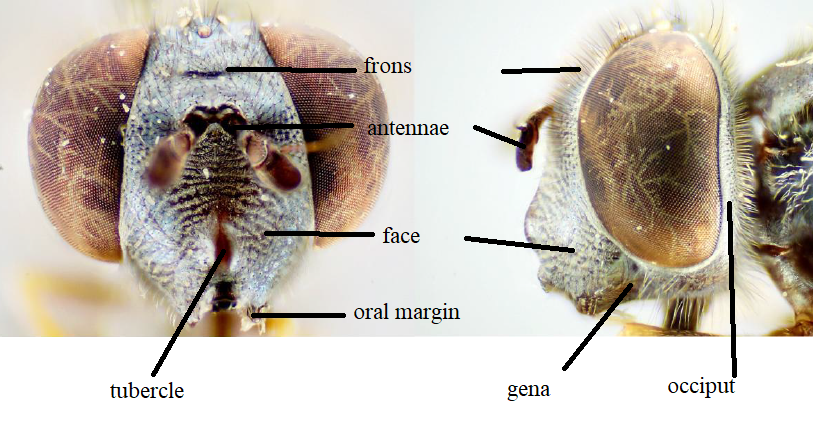
Head

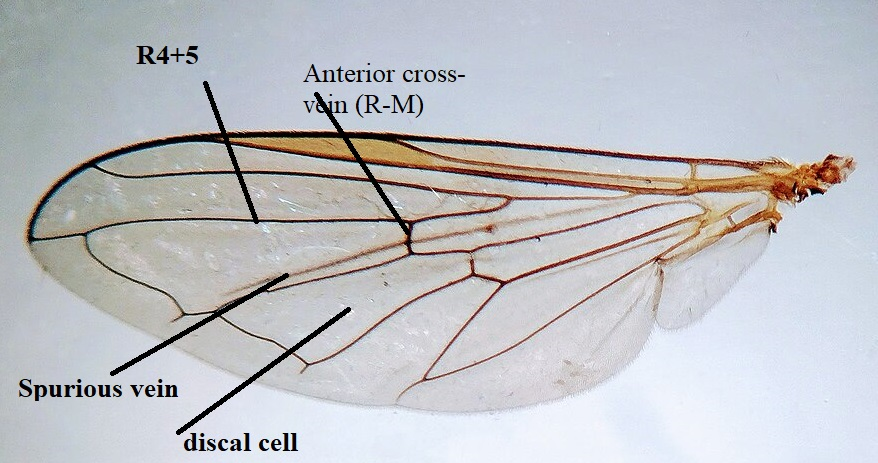
Wing

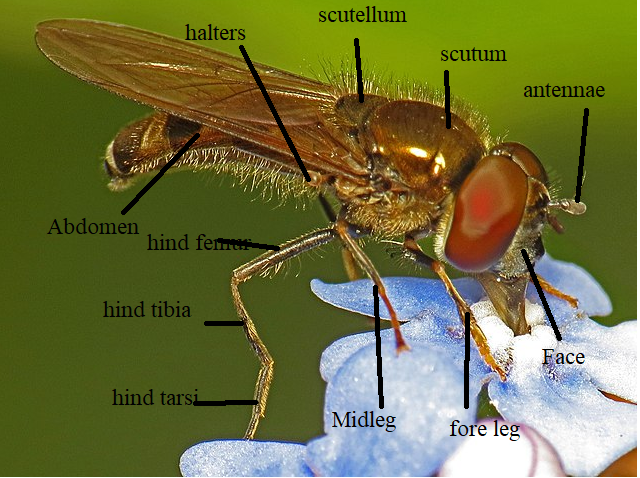
Bod
