= Platycheirus islandicus =

Conservation status
- Vulnerable (IUCN 3.1)

Scientific classification
- Kingdom: Animalia
- Phylum: Arthropoda
- Clade: Pancrustacea
- Class: Insecta
- Order: Diptera
- Family: Syrphidae
- Genus: Platycheirus
- Subgenus: Platycheirus
- Species: P. islandicus

Binomial name
- Platycheirus islandicus (Ringdahl, 1930)

Species of fly

Platycheirus islandicus is a species of syrphid fly in the hoverfly family Syrphidae. It has occasionally been identified as a synonym of the closely related Platycheirus peltatus but several authorities offer it full species status, and it has been recognized as vulnerable by the IUCN. It is one of the few species recognized as endemic to Iceland. Within Iceland, the species is typically found in birch forests but it may also occur in meadows and on beaches. It can be seen between June and August.

== Description ==
A typical syrphid fly, 9–11 mm (0.35–0.43 in) in length showing four pairs of yellow spots on tergite 2–5. Platycheirus islandicus displays sexual dimorphism with clear morphological variability among the legs of males and females. In most respects it is extremely similar to Platycheirus peltatus.
