= Platycheirus europaeus =

Scientific classification
- Kingdom: Animalia
- Phylum: Arthropoda
- Clade: Pancrustacea
- Class: Insecta
- Order: Diptera
- Family: Syrphidae
- Genus: Platycheirus
- Subgenus: Platycheirus
- Species: P. europaeus

Binomial name
- Platycheirus europaeus Goeldlin, Maibach & Speight, 1990

Species of fly

Platycheirus europaeus is a Palearctic species of hoverfly. It is found in many parts of Europe and eastern Asiatic Russia The habitat is brook floodplains and wet flushes in montane grassland and beside streams or flushes in forest in the Carpinus and Quercus zone up into the Fagus and Picea/ Pinus zone. Flies among grasses from May to August. Flowers visited include Graminae and Cyperaceae, Ranunculus, Taraxacum.
