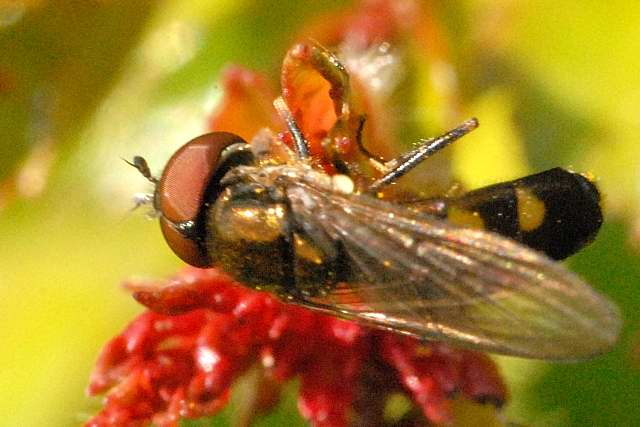
- Male

Scientific classification
- Kingdom: Animalia
- Phylum: Arthropoda
- Clade: Pancrustacea
- Class: Insecta
- Order: Diptera
- Family: Syrphidae
- Genus: Platycheirus
- Subgenus: Platycheirus
- Species: P. splendidus

Binomial name
- Platycheirus splendidus Rotheray, 1998

= Platycheirus splendidus =

Species of fly

Platycheirus splendidus is a species of hoverfly. It is found in many parts of Britain and Europe.
