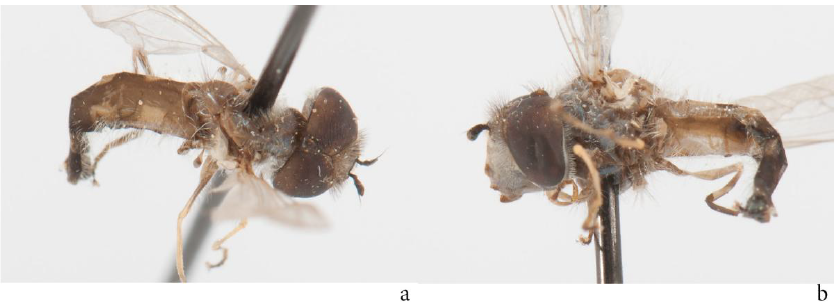
- Male

Scientific classification
- Kingdom: Animalia
- Phylum: Arthropoda
- Clade: Pancrustacea
- Class: Insecta
- Order: Diptera
- Family: Syrphidae
- Genus: Platycheirus
- Species: P. alpigenus

Binomial name
- Platycheirus alpigenus Barkalov & Nielsen, 2008

= Platycheirus alpigenus =

Species of fly

Platycheirus alpigenus is a rare high mountain species of fly. Platycheirus can remain nearly motionless in flight. Adults are also known as flower flies for they are commonly found on flowers from which they get both energy-giving nectar and protein rich pollen. Larvae unknown for this species but Platycheirus are generally aphid predators.

== Description male ==
For terminology see Speight key to genera and glossary or Glossary of morphological terminology

Length
6.8–9.3 mm (0.27–0.37 in)
Head
The face is slightly produced ventrally, with the anterior oral margin extending forward. Dorsally, there is a weak median keel located between the antennal bases. The surface is densely covered in grey pollen, and the tubercle is shining and somewhat prominent. The antennae are dark, with the basal half of the arista being distinctly swollen.
Thorax
The thorax has a yellowish pleural pile, while the mesonotal pile consists of approximately half yellowish and half black. The katepisternum is sparsely grey pollinose, and the halter is dark brown. The wing has the basal two-thirds of cells c and bm bare, with the apical quarter of the cup also bare.
Abdomen
The abdomen is parallel-sided and features silver pollinose spots on a grey background. Tergite 5 is dark and unmarked.
Legs
The fore femur is pale on the apical third, while the mid and hind femora are pale at their apex. Both the fore and mid tibiae are pale on the basal third and at the extreme apex. The fore tibia has a row of strong, black, posterolateral setae. The lengths of these setae vary: in the basal third, they are approximately equal to the width of the tibia, and in the apical two-thirds, they are 2 to 3 times longer than the tibial width. Additionally, some apical setae reach the middle of the first tarsomere.

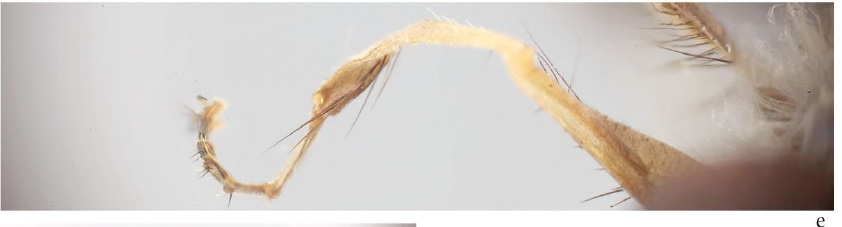
P. alpigenus male front leg

== Distribution ==
This species is currently known from two widely separated localities: a high-altitude (2200 m) meadow in the Altai Mountains, Russia, and High Creek Fen (3000 m) in South Park County, Colorado, USA, about 6,800 kilometres (4,200 mi) apart. This suggests that the Nearctic specimens collected in Colorado represent a separate, extremely morphologically similar species, or that P. alpigenus occurs in other high-altitude meadows and fens throughout the Holarctic Region.
