= Platycheirus confusus =

- P. confusus male

Scientific classification
- Kingdom: Animalia
- Phylum: Arthropoda
- Clade: Pancrustacea
- Class: Insecta
- Order: Diptera
- Family: Syrphidae
- Genus: Platycheirus
- Species: P. confusus

Binomial name
- Platycheirus confusus (Curran, 1925)

Synonyms
- Melanostoma confusus Curran, 1925

Species of fly

Platycheirus confusus, the confusing sedgesitter, is a common species of syrphid fly in the family Syrphidae. It has been found to have and eastern and western North American population. Larvae have been successfully reared on a diet of Adelges piceae.

== Description MALE ==
For terminology Speight key to genera and glossary
external link to photos
Size 6–8.2 mm (0.24–0.32 in)

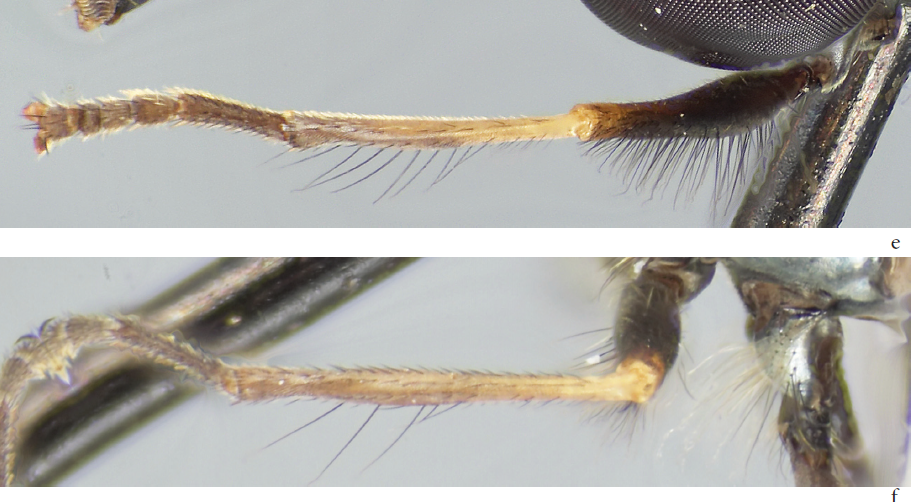
Platycheirus confusus male front and mid legs.

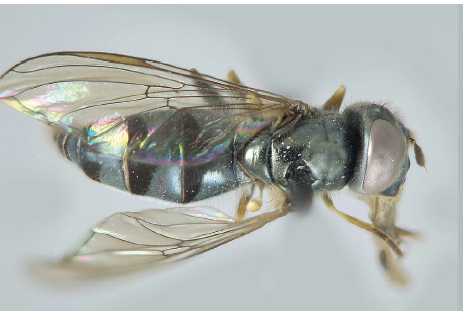
Platycheirus confusus female body

The face slopes downward slightly, and the front of the oral margin does not extend as far forward as the tubercle. A broad, shiny stripe runs down the center of the face from the lower facial margin almost to the antennae. The greyish pollinosity on the sides of the stripe appears to have faint oblique ripples. The legs are mostly dark, with only the tips of the femora and the basal three-quarters of the fore and mid tibiae being orange. On the upper two-thirds of the fore tibia, there is a row of weak, posterior setae, with the longest setae being approximately three times the diameter of the tibia. The mid tibia also has a similar row of setae on its upper two-thirds. The thorax has very sparse grey pollinosity, almost appearing bare. The longest scutellar pile is as long as the arista, while other thoracic piles are no longer than half the length of the scutellar pile. The upper half of the pleura usually has dark pile, while the lower half of the pleura has white pile. The halter is brown. The wing is typically brownish and almost entirely microtrichose, with only small bare patches near cells c and bm. The abdomen is parallel-sided, with brown spots on its tergites, some of which are overlaid with prominent silver pollinosity that may even merge medially on tergites 3 and 4. The lateral pile on the abdomen is mostly pale. The surstylus has a stout and almost straight lateral lobe.

General Anatomy click to enlarge

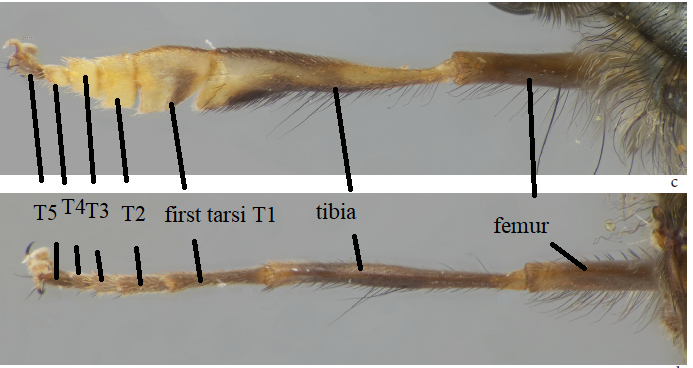
Legs

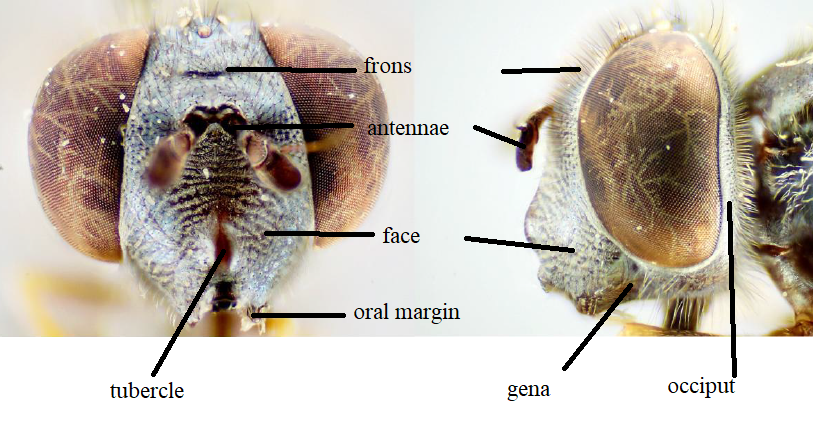
Head

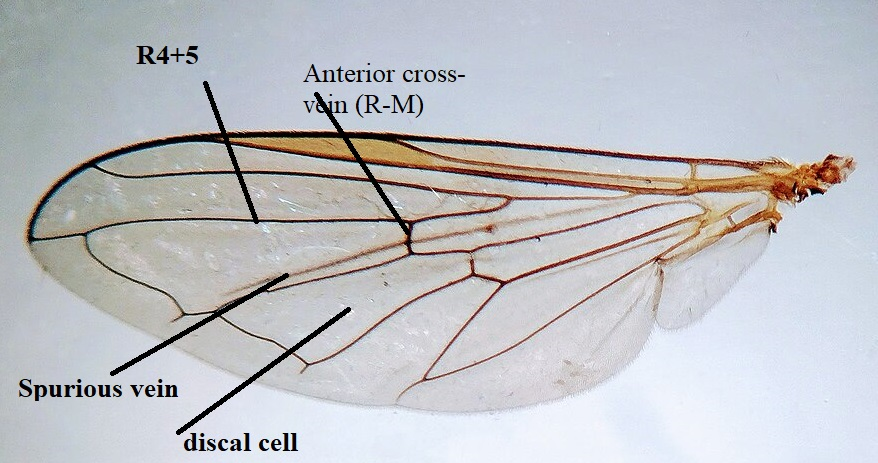
Wing

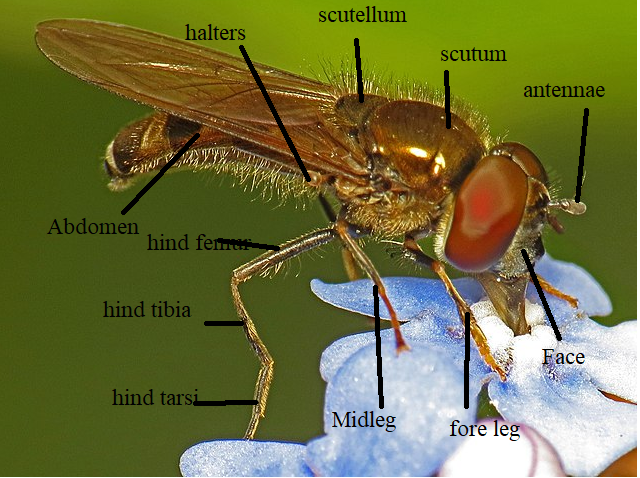
Bod
