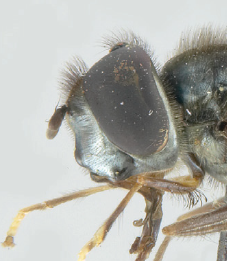
- Platycheirus ciliatus male

Scientific classification
- Kingdom: Animalia
- Phylum: Arthropoda
- Clade: Pancrustacea
- Class: Insecta
- Order: Diptera
- Family: Syrphidae
- Genus: Platycheirus
- Species: P. ciliatus

Binomial name
- Platycheirus ciliatus (Bigot, 1884)

Synonyms
- Platycheirus frontosus (Lovett, 1919)

= Platycheirus ciliatus =

Species of fly

Platycheirus ciliatus, the Pacific sedgesitter, is a species of hoverfly. They have been found in Canada: British Columbia. USA: Alaska, California, Oregon, Washington. Larvae are unknown.

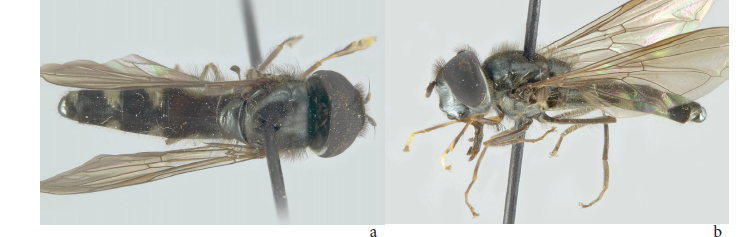
P. ciliatus male

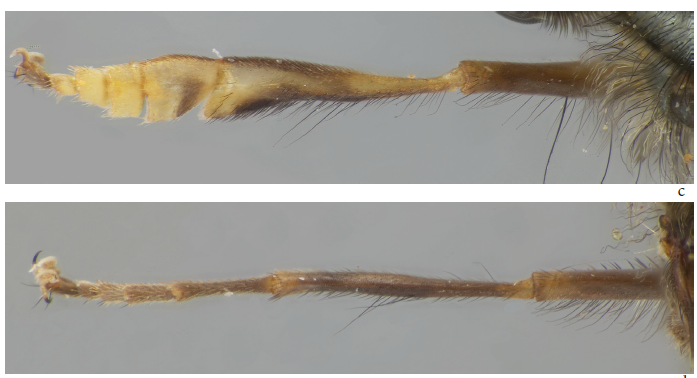
P. ciliatus male front and mid legs

== Description ==
For terminology see Speight key to genera and glossary or Glossary of morphological terminology

Length
7.7–10 mm (0.30–0.39 in)

The fore femur features a posterior subbasal tuft consisting of 3 to 4 long, pale setae that have wavy or broadened ends. The fore tibia is broadened along its entire length, while the fore tarsus is also broadened and flattened. The mid femur has anterior and posterior rows of pile, with the posterior row being longer. Additionally, the mid tibia contains a few tufts of pile. The abdomen is parallel-sided, and tergites 2 to 4 are marked by paired silver pollinose spots.

The specimen is similar to Platycheirus albimanus. Ciliatus has both the last tarsomere of the foreleg and the first tarsomere of the mid-leg are darkened above. The fore tibia has a posteroapical angle that is rounded, projecting slightly posteriorly beyond the level of the first tarsomere. The mid tarsus is brown to dark brown throughout.
