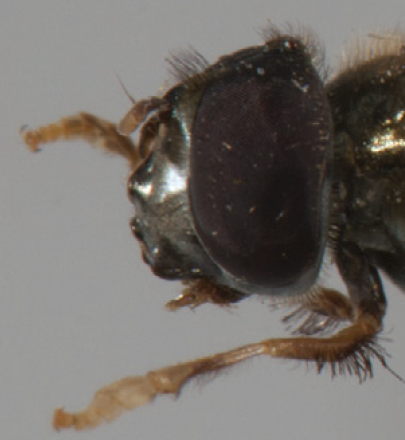
- Platycheirus latitarsis male from Andrew Young

Scientific classification
- Kingdom: Animalia
- Phylum: Arthropoda
- Clade: Pancrustacea
- Class: Insecta
- Order: Diptera
- Family: Syrphidae
- Genus: Platycheirus
- Species: P. latitarsis

Binomial name
- Platycheirus latitarsis (Vockeroth, 1986)
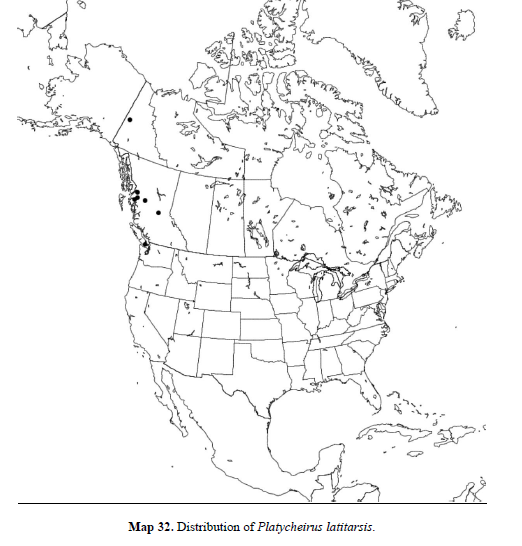
- Platycheirus latitarsis map 2017

= Platycheirus latitarsis =

Species of fly

Platycheirus latitarsis, the flathand sedgesitter, is a species of fly in the family Syrphidae. It is a rare species found in Western and central Canada. (see map)

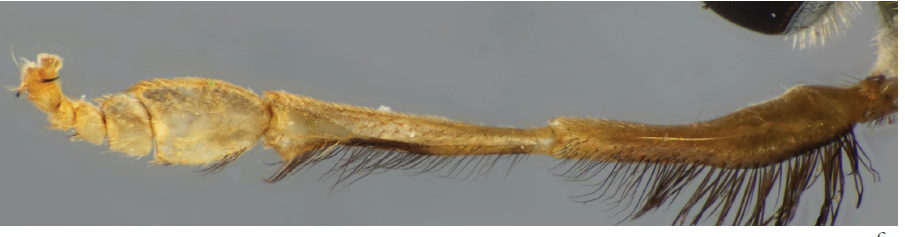
Platycheirus latitarsis front leg from Andrew Young

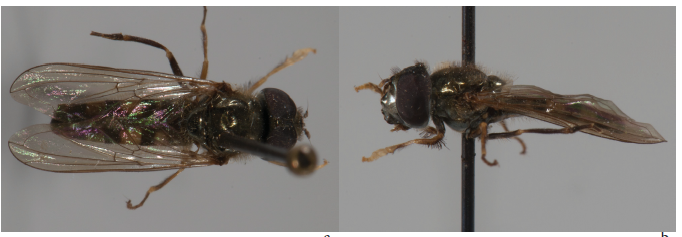
Platycheirus latitarsis male from Andrew Young

== Description ==
For terminology see Speight key to genera and glossary or Glossary of morphological terminology
"Very similar to P. amplus, differing as follows: First fore tarsomere strongly flattened, slightly less than twice as long as wide, without a dorsal keel. Mid tibia slightly swollen subbasally and apically, with an anteroventral tuft of short, dark or pale, slightly wavy pile up to 1.5 times as long as tibial diameter on subbasal swelling. Hind tibia with anterior setae somewhat denser. First hind tarsomere barely swollen basally, tapering uniformly to narrow apex. Legs otherwise unmodified. Thorax sparsely yellow or grey pollinose. Scutellar pile approximately as long as arista, other thoracic pile no more than half as long. Pile of scutum and scutellum mixed dark-yellow and black."

General Anatomy click to enlarge

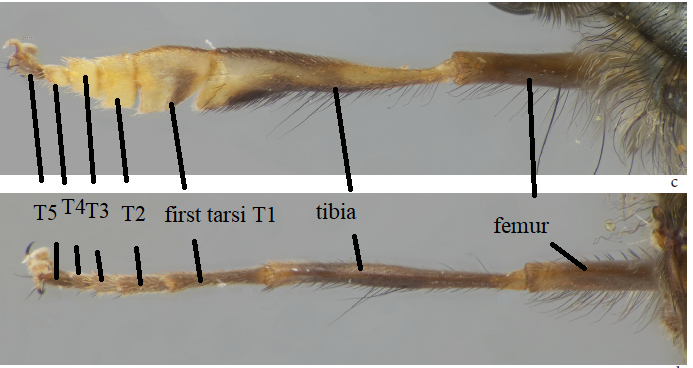
Legs

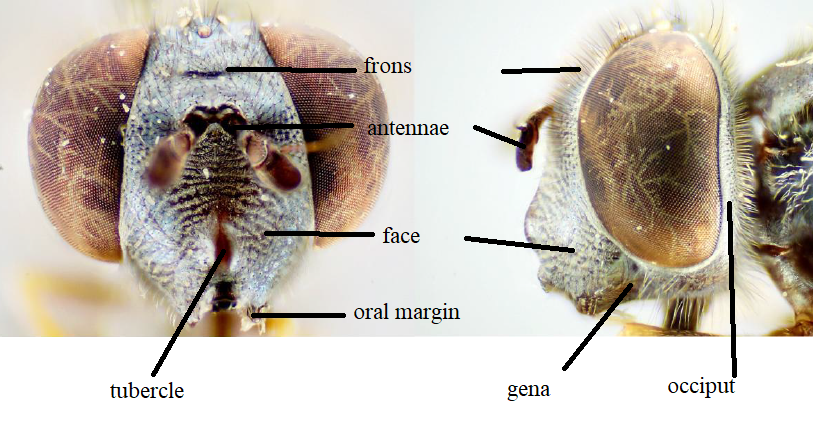
Head

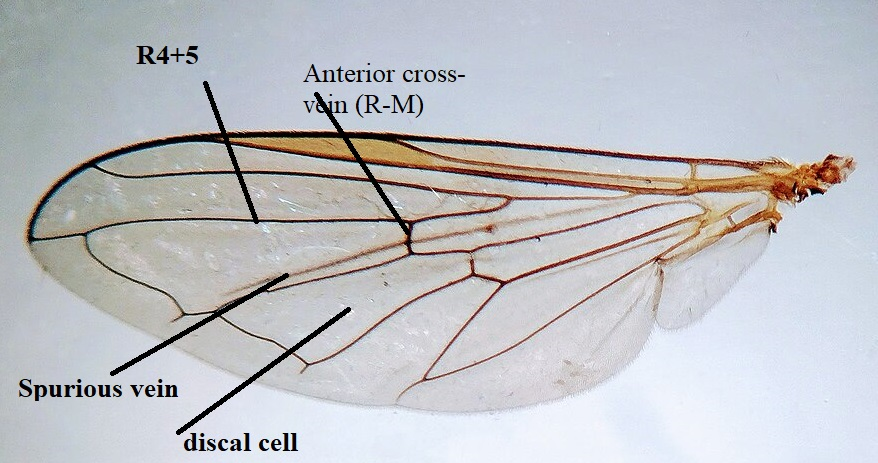
Wing

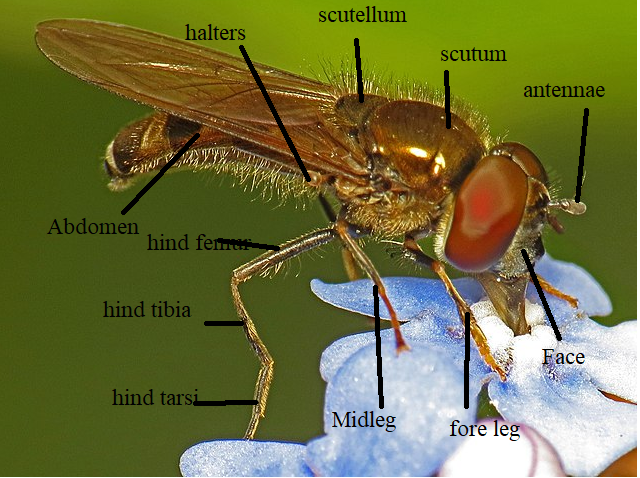
Body
