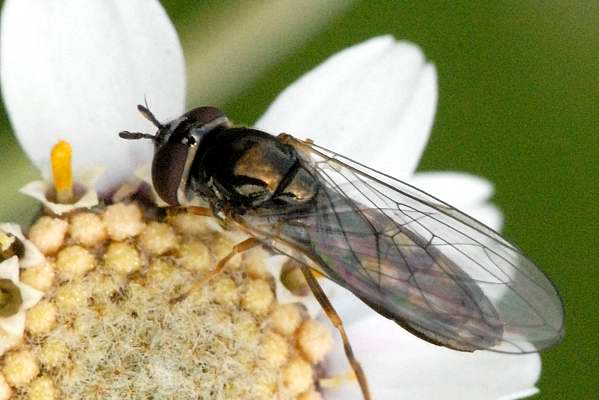
- Female

Scientific classification
- Kingdom: Animalia
- Phylum: Arthropoda
- Clade: Pancrustacea
- Class: Insecta
- Order: Diptera
- Family: Syrphidae
- Genus: Platycheirus
- Subgenus: Platycheirus
- Species: P. occultus

Binomial name
- Platycheirus occultus Goeldlin de Tiefenau Maibach & Speight, 1990

= Platycheirus occultus =

Species of fly

Platycheirus occultus is a Palearctic species of hoverfly.

== Description ==
External images For terms see Morphology of Diptera
Tarsae 1: apical half of all segments without dark brown to black blotches ventrally. Femora 1 black to dark brown for less than half its length. Surstyli pale-haired.

== Distribution ==
Norway, Sweden, Finland, Denmark, Ireland, Britain, North Germany, France Switzerland, Spain and northern Italy (Apennines), Serbia, Turkey

== Biology ==
Habitat: fen and bog, coastal marsh and dune slacks, humid, seasonally-flooded, grassland, moorland, taiga wetlands. Flies April to September.
