= Platycheirus varipes =

Scientific classification
- Kingdom: Animalia
- Phylum: Arthropoda
- Clade: Pancrustacea
- Class: Insecta
- Order: Diptera
- Family: Syrphidae
- Genus: Platycheirus
- Subgenus: Platycheirus
- Species: P. varipes

Binomial name
- Platycheirus varipes Curran 1923

Species of fly

Platycheirus varipes, the silver sedgesitter, or flower fly, is a rare species of syrphid fly observed in Northern Europe: Norway, Sweden, Finland; Greenland; central Asiatic Russia; and in North America from Alaska and Canada south to Colorado, via mountain chains.

Hoverflies can remain nearly motionless in flight. Adult Platycheirus varipes are also known as flower flies for they are commonly found on flowers from which they get both energy-giving nectar and protein rich pollen. Larvae are aphid predators.
