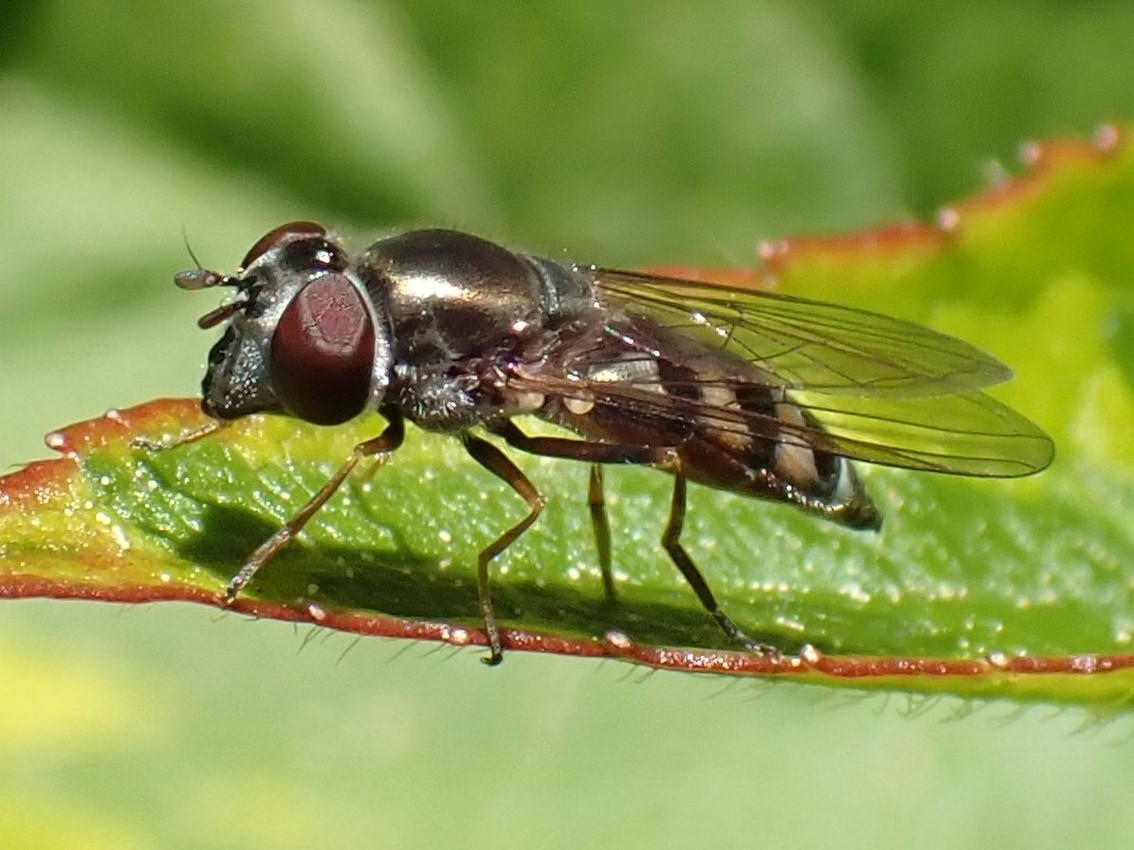

Scientific classification
- Kingdom: Animalia
- Phylum: Arthropoda
- Clade: Pancrustacea
- Class: Insecta
- Order: Diptera
- Family: Syrphidae
- Genus: Platycheirus
- Species: P. trichopus

Binomial name
- Platycheirus trichopus (Thomson, 1869)

Synonyms
- Syrphus trichopus Thomson, 1869

= Platycheirus trichopus =

Species of fly

Platycheirus trichopus, the western forest sedgesitter, is a species of syrphid fly in the Bacchini tribe of the Syrphidae family. This flower fly is typically found west of the Rocky Mountains in North America. Most Platycheirus species cannot be identified past genus without microscopic examination, but according to Even Dankowicz, P. trichopus has a unique set of characteristics that make it an exception when/where high quality images of the head/face are available.
