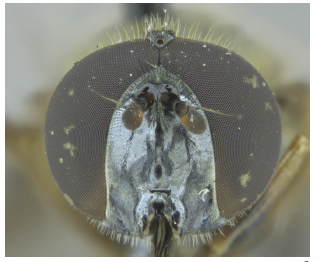
- Male

Scientific classification
- Kingdom: Animalia
- Phylum: Arthropoda
- Clade: Pancrustacea
- Class: Insecta
- Order: Diptera
- Family: Syrphidae
- Genus: Platycheirus
- Species: P. luteipennis

Binomial name
- Platycheirus luteipennis (Curran, 1931)

Synonyms
- Melanostoma agens (Curran, 1931); Melanostoma luteipennis (Curran, 1925 ); Melanostoma atra (Curran, 1925)

= Platycheirus luteipennis =

Species of fly

Platycheirus luteipennis, the coppery sedgesitter, is a rarely collected but widely distributed species of fly in the syrphidae family commonly called hoverflies. It has been identified from Alberta, Saskatchewan, Manitoba, Quebec, Montana, North Dakota, and Colorado. The larvae are unknown.

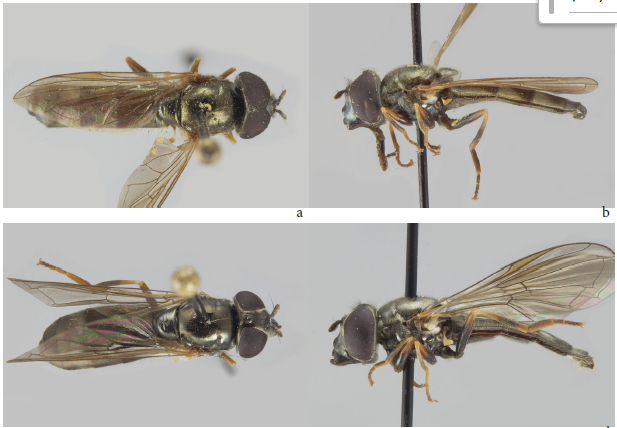
Platycheirus luteipennis male above, female below figure 1 Andrew Young

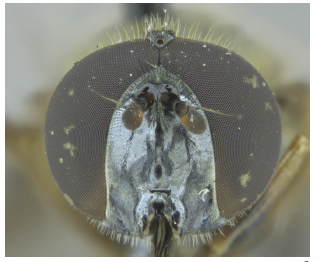
Platycheirus luteipennis male head figure 2 Andrew Young

== Description ==
For terminology see

- Speight’s Key to Genera of European Syrphidae with Morphological terms.
- Glossary of morphological terminology of adult Syrphidae, Steenis
- Picture key to Nearctic syrphid genera, Miranda et al.

Size 8.7–10.1 mm (0.34–0.40 in)

Head
The face is pushed forward and downward, covered with a thin grayish powder except for the shining median stripe on the tubercle. It is sparsely dusted creating minute oblique striations in the integument on the lateral sides.( see figure 2). The upper part of the face features a moderately strong median keel. The antenna is black, with the first flagellomere being orange on the underside (refer to the general anatomy of the head).

Thorax
The scutum and scutellum are shining and slightly coppery, adorned with short brassy yellow hairs. The sides are also shining, featuring short yellow to yellow-brown hairs. (Refer to the body anatomy section below.)

Wing
The cell c is bare from about the basal one-sixth, while cell bm is at least one-third bare. Additionally, cell cup is broadly bare on the basal one-third. (Refer to the wing anatomy section below.) The knob of the halter is orange.
Legs
The legs are mostly orange-brown, with the basal one-third to half of the mid femora typically featuring a blackish-brown to black preapical ring on each tibia. They are simple, lacking outstanding hairs or bristles. The first tarsomere of the hind leg is slightly swollen and is about four times as long as its greatest depth. Otherwise, there are no distinctive markings.

Abdomen
The abdomen is moderately slender. The tergites, (or segments), are opaque black with shining lateral sides. Segments 2 to 4 each have a pair of large sublateral spots that are either coppery or slightly dusty. The spots on segment 2 are located near the middle of the segment and are broadly separated medially. On segment 3, the spots are positioned near the front margin and are closely spaced. The spots on segment 4 are situated on the front margin and are irregular, sometimes appearing to cover most of the segment. Segment 5 is shining and coppery black.(figure 1)

General Anatomy click to enlarge

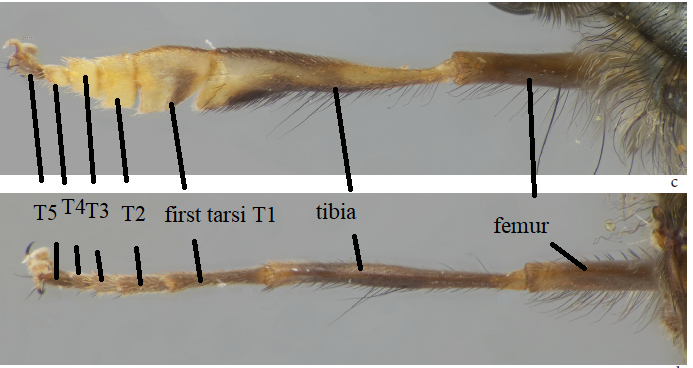
Legs

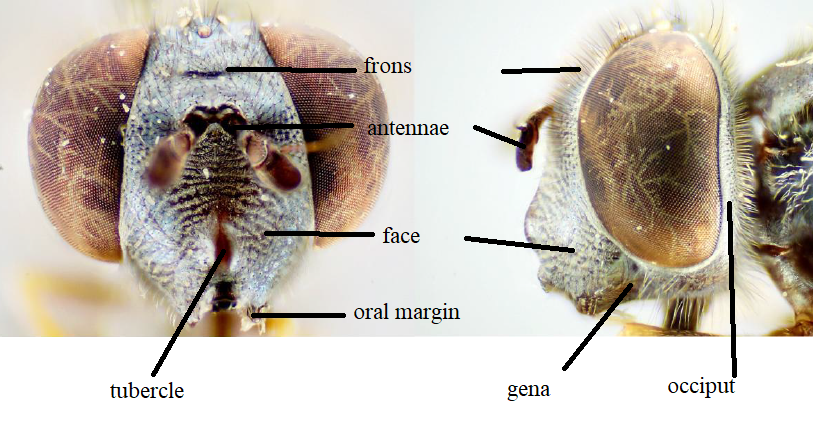
Head

Wing

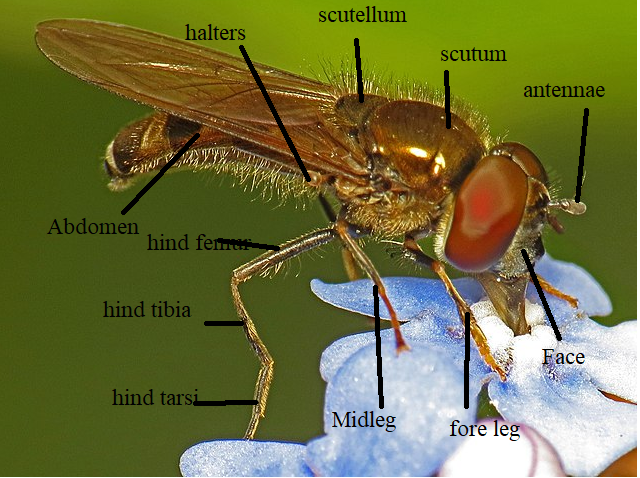
Body
