= Platycheirus scamboides =

Scientific classification
- Kingdom: Animalia
- Phylum: Arthropoda
- Clade: Pancrustacea
- Class: Insecta
- Order: Diptera
- Family: Syrphidae
- Genus: Platycheirus
- Subgenus: Platycheirus
- Species: P. scamboides

Binomial name
- Platycheirus scamboides Curran 1927

Species of insect

Platycheirus scamboides, the yellowspine sedgesitter, is a rare species of syrphid fly observed in northeastern North America. Hoverflies can remain nearly motionless in flight. The adults are also known as flower flies for they are commonly found on flowers, from which they get both energy-giving nectar and protein-rich pollen. Larvae are aphid predators.
