= Platycheirus nodosus =

Scientific classification
- Kingdom: Animalia
- Phylum: Arthropoda
- Clade: Pancrustacea
- Class: Insecta
- Order: Diptera
- Family: Syrphidae
- Genus: Platycheirus
- Subgenus: Platycheirus
- Species: P. nodosus

Binomial name
- Platycheirus nodosus Curran 1923

Species of fly

Platycheirus nodosus, the twospear sedgesitter, is an uncommon species of syrphid fly observed in Canada and The Rocky Mountains. Hoverflies can remain nearly motionless in flight. The adults are also known as flower flies for they are commonly found on flowers from which they get both energy-giving nectar and protein-rich pollen. Larvae are aphid predators.
