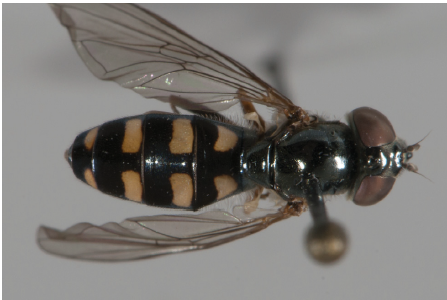
- Platycheirus naso female Andrew Young

Scientific classification
- Kingdom: Animalia
- Phylum: Arthropoda
- Clade: Pancrustacea
- Class: Insecta
- Order: Diptera
- Family: Syrphidae
- Genus: Platycheirus
- Species: P. naso

Binomial name
- Platycheirus naso (Walker, 1849)

Synonyms
- Syrphus naso Walker, 1849

= Platycheirus naso =

Species of fly

Platycheirus naso, the tufted sedgesitter, is a rare species of syrphid fly. Hoverflies get their names from the ability to remain nearly motionless while in flight The adults are also known as flower flies for they are commonly around flowers where they get energy-giving nectar and protein rich pollen. Range: Norway, Sweden, Finland, Siberia, Alaska south through mountain chains to Colorado. Platycheirus holarcticus Vockeroth is recognized as a junior synonym of Syrphus naso Walker. From Andrew Young 2012 Master's thesis.

== Description ==
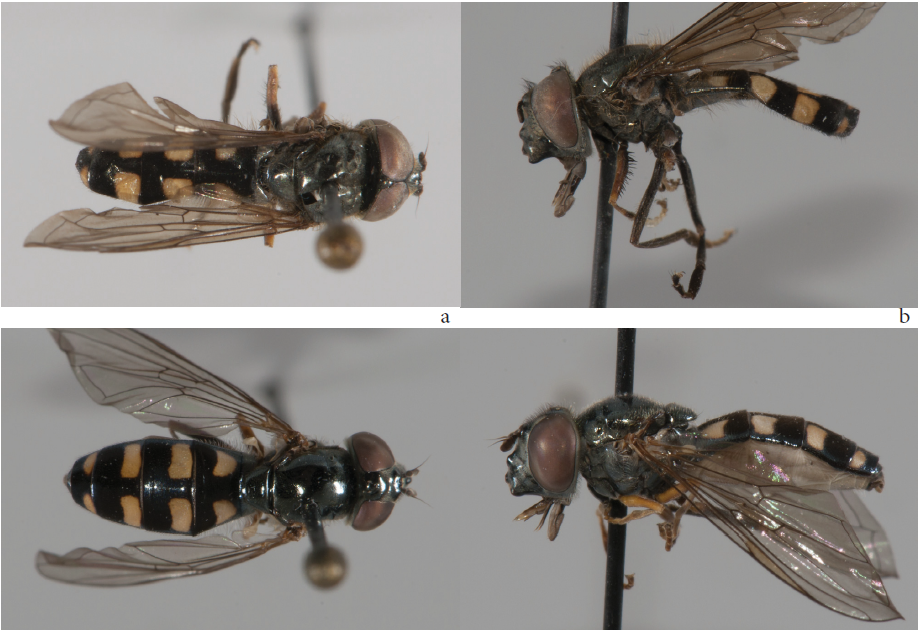
Platycheirus naso male above Andrew Young

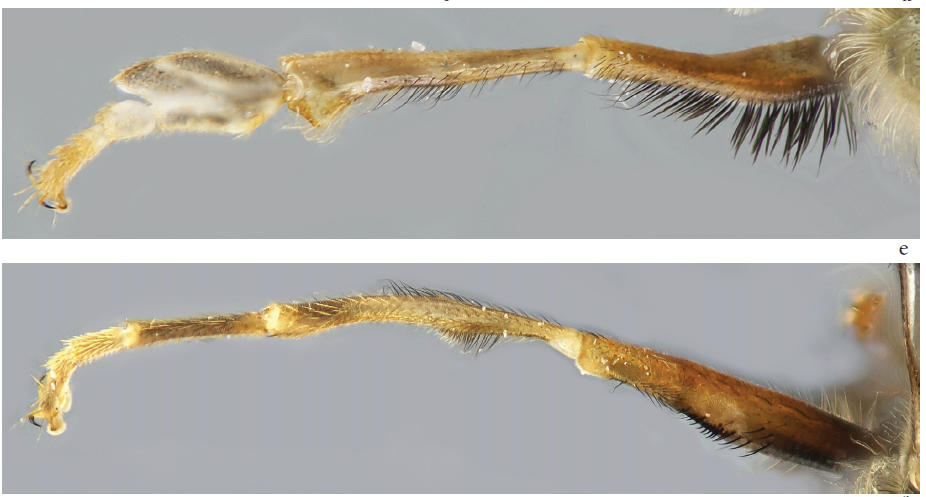
Platycheirus naso male legs front above Andrew Young

- Spheight's Key to Genera of European Syrphidae with Morphological terms.
- Glossary of morphological terminology of adult Syrphidae, Steenis.

"Body length: 7.1.10.1 mm.

Diagnosis of MALE: Very similar to amplus, differing as follows: Face produced somewhat farther forward, with anterior oral margin usually reaching level of tubercle. Gena slightly wider than basoflagellomere when viewed ventrolaterally. First fore tarsomere with a strong dorsal keel on entire length. Second fore tarsomere with a dorsal keel on entire length. Remaining tarsomeres unmodified. Anteroventral tuft of mid tibia with pile slightly shorter, and sometimes with a sparse to dense pale pile. Hind tibia with anterior setae much denser. First hind tarsomere slightly swollen, about 4.5 times as long as its greatest depth, less obviously swollen basally. Pile of scutum and scutellum approximately as long as arista, other thoracic pile no more than two-thirds as long. Upper half of anepimeron with dark pile forming a distinct tuft, lower half of anepimeron bare. Pile of scutum and scutellum mostly black, with some yellow pile interspersed. Pleura with pile ranging from yellow to brown. Wing brown-tinted, completely microtrichose. Halter yellow to brown. Spots of tergites 3 and 4 sometimes separated from anterior edge of tergite. Spots of tergite 5 sometimes absent."

From Andrew Young

General anatomy click to enlarge

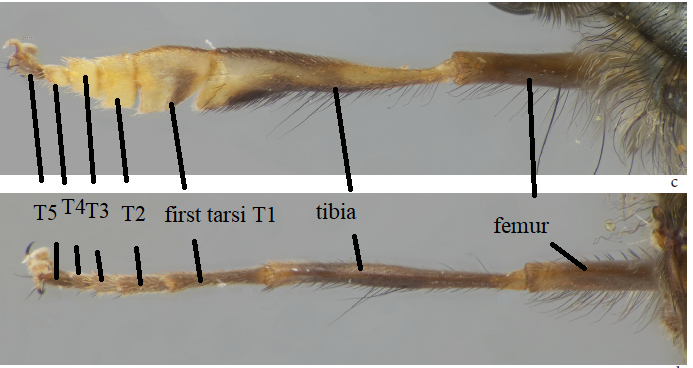
Legs

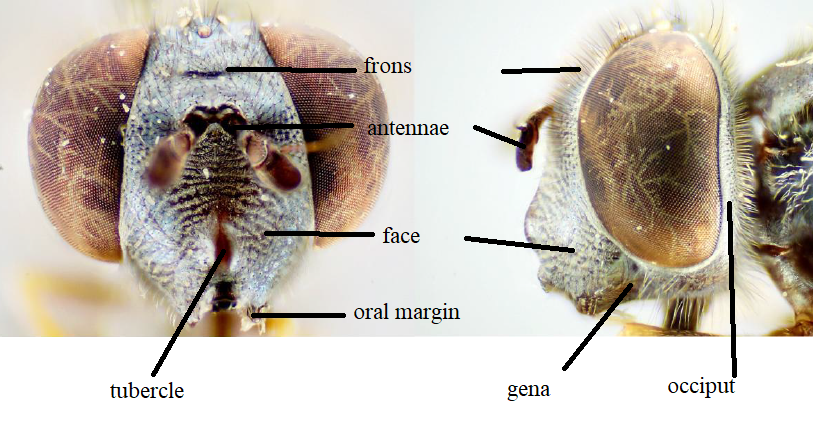
Head

Wing

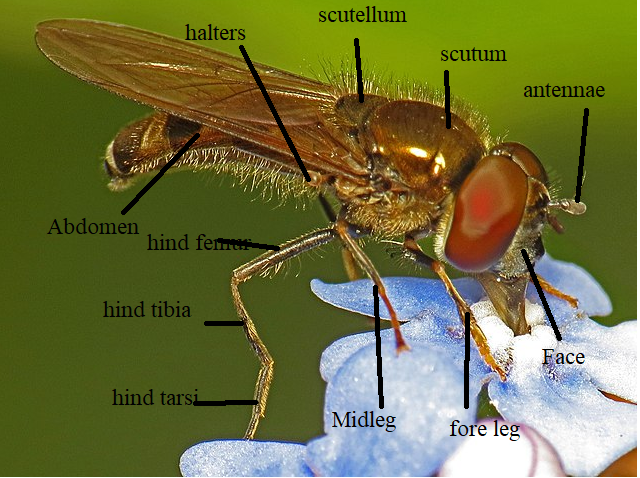
Body
