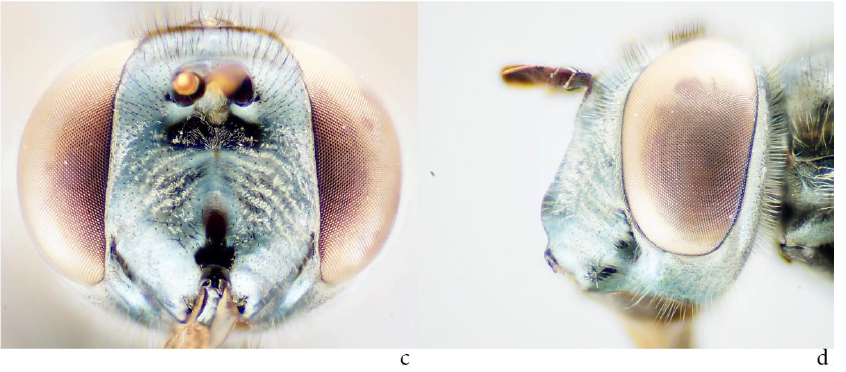
- Female head

Scientific classification
- Kingdom: Animalia
- Phylum: Arthropoda
- Clade: Pancrustacea
- Class: Insecta
- Order: Diptera
- Family: Syrphidae
- Genus: Platycheirus
- Species: P. hesperius

Binomial name
- Platycheirus hesperius (Vockeroth, 1986 )

Synonyms
- Melanostoma chaetopoda (Davidson, 1922 )

= Platycheirus hesperius =

Species of fly

Platycheirus hesperius, the southern punctate sedgesitter, is a fly in the Syrphidae family. It is a rare species, found in the western US, ranging from Washington to southern California. Adults are also referred to as flower flies because they are commonly found on flowers, where they feed on nectar and pollen. They are also called hoverflies due to their ability to remain nearly motionless in flight.

== Description ==
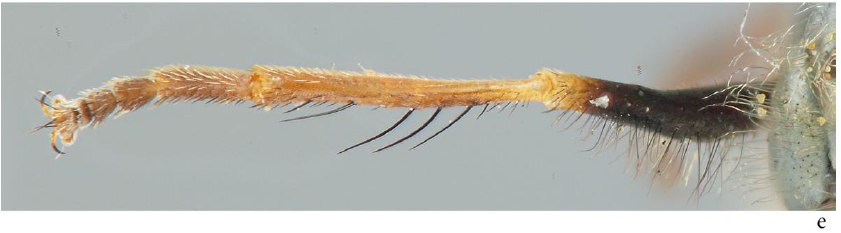
Figure 1 P. hesperius male front leg

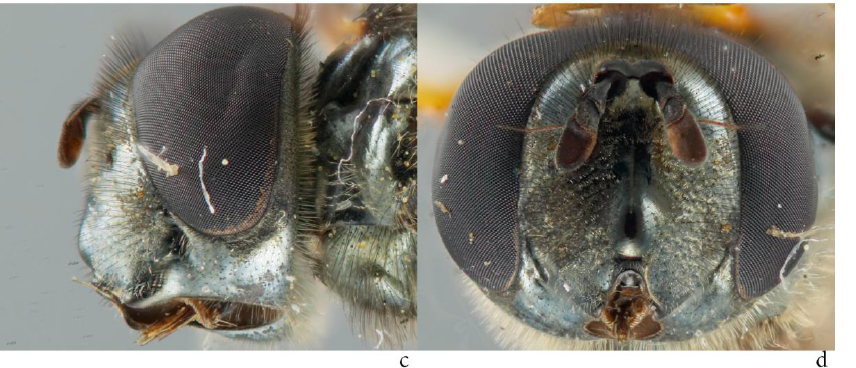
Figure 2 P. hesperius male head

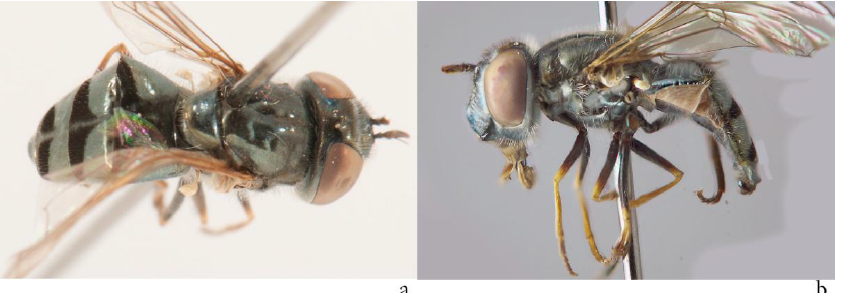
Figure 3 P. hesperius female body

Size
5.7–7.9 mm (0.22–0.31 in)
Head
The face has a narrow black shining median stripe along the tubercle featuring small punctures arranged in oblique rows covered with a greyish pollinosity (dusting). (figure 2)

Legs
The legs have dark femora, and all the tibiae and tarsi are yellow (figure3). The fore and mid-tarsomeres are brown above and orange ventrally. The fore-tibia has a row of 5-7 strong posterior setae on the apical three-quarters, with the longest setae approximately three times the tibial diameter. (figure 1) The mid tibia has a similar row of weaker setae on the apical two-thirds, while the legs are otherwise unmodified.

Abdomen
The abdomen has large spots of brown or grey on the tergites, overlaid with strong silver dusting, which can almost touch in the center on tergites 3 and 4. (figure 3).

General Anatomy, click to enlarge

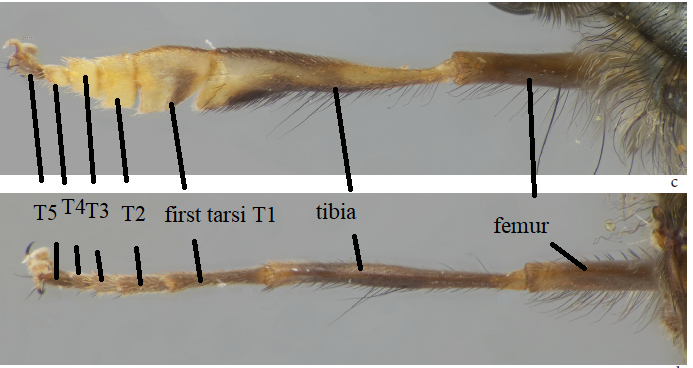
Legs

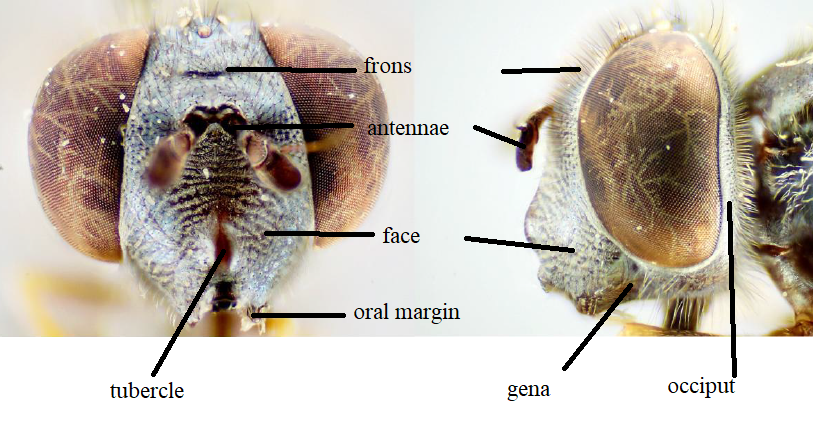
Head

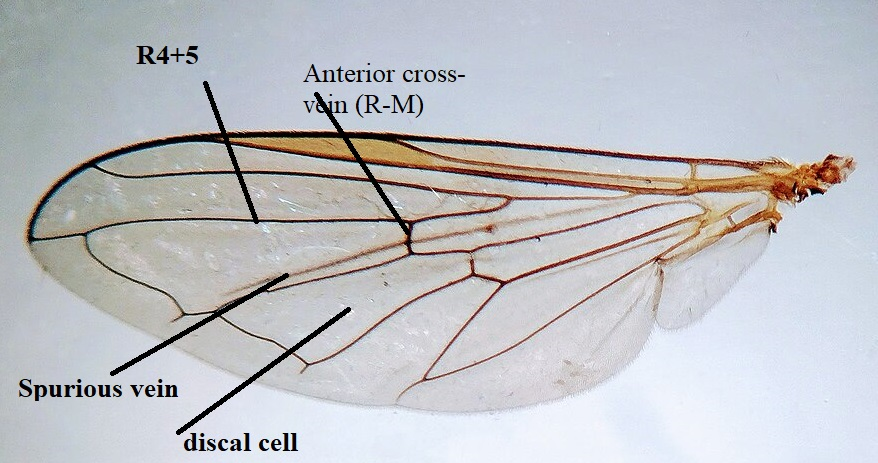
Wing

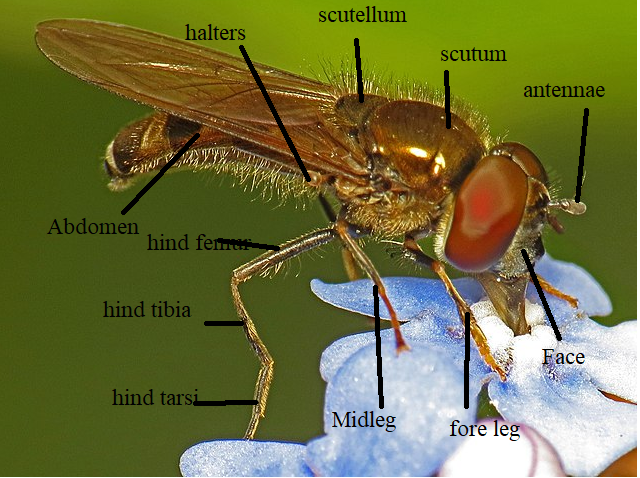
Body
