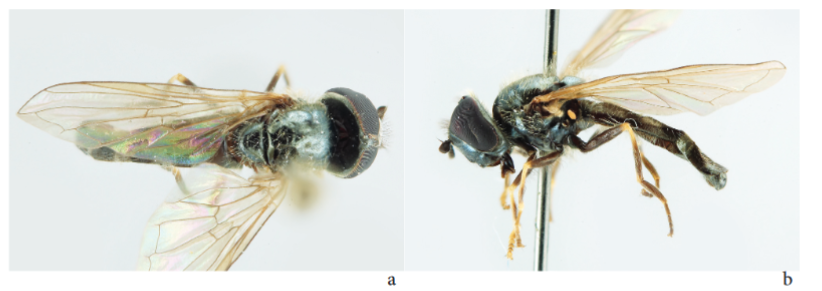
- Male

Scientific classification
- Kingdom: Animalia
- Phylum: Arthropoda
- Clade: Pancrustacea
- Class: Insecta
- Order: Diptera
- Family: Syrphidae
- Genus: Platycheirus
- Species: P. aeratus

Binomial name
- Platycheirus aeratus (Coquillett, 1900)

Synonyms
- Platycheirus occidentalis (Curran, 1927); Platycheirus pauper Hull 1944); Platychirus angustitarsis Kanervo, 1934; Platycheirus occidentalis Curran 1927)

= Platycheirus aeratus =

Species of fly

Platycheirus aeratus, commonly known as Coquillett's sedgesitter, is a species of hoverfly.

== Description ==
Length
5.3–7.3 mm (0.21–0.29 in)

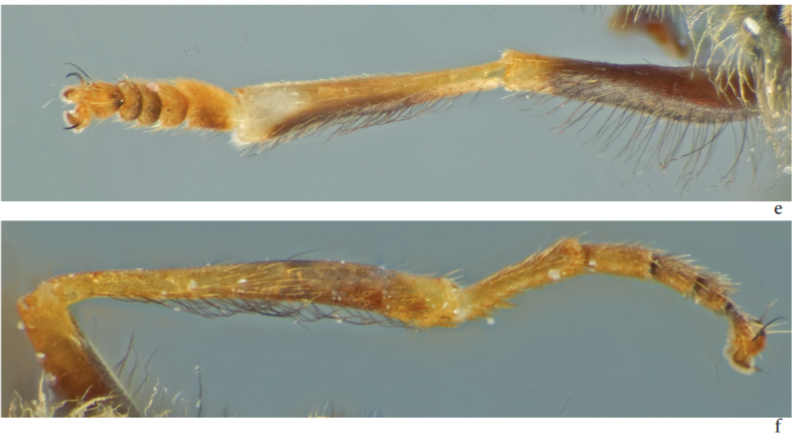
P.aeratus leg male front and mid

Head
The face is vertical and thinly grey pollinose, featuring a shining tubercle. The oral margin is rounded and not produced forward.
Legs
The legs are mostly dark, except for the ends of the femora, the fore tibia, the bases and ends of the mid and hind tibia, as well as the fore and mid tarsomeres, which are all pale. The fore femur features a nearly basal tuft of 2-3 long, thin, wavy, closely appressed white setae, while the rest of the femur has only long, fine, wavy black pile. The fore tibia is somewhat broadened from base to end and is covered with fine wavy black pile. The first fore tarsomere is broadened slightly past the base, is parallel-sided, and is slightly narrower than the fore tibia. The remaining fore tarsomeres are unmodified. The mid tibia has dense, fine black pile on its lower front for three-quarters of its length. Additionally, the first hind tarsomere is slightly swollen. Overall, the legs are otherwise unmodified.
Thorax
Sparsely grey pollinose with short yellow and wavy pile
Wings
Brown-tinted and entirely microtrichose. The Halter is yellow,
Abdomen
Is thin and even-sided. The tergites are entirely dark pollinose except tergites 3 and 4 have small, circular spots near the anterior margin.

General Anatomy click to enlarge

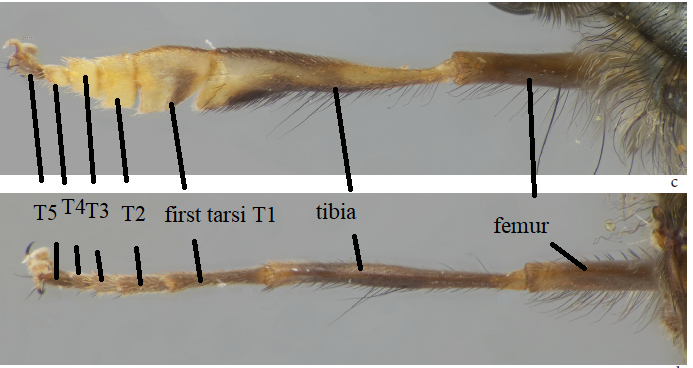
Legs

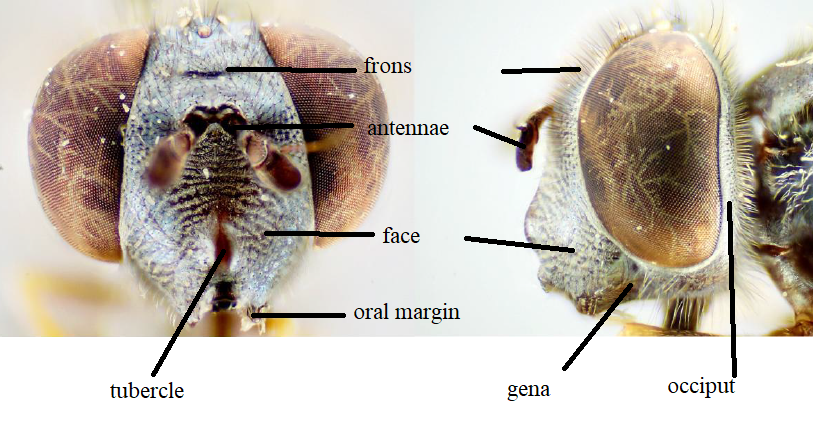
Head

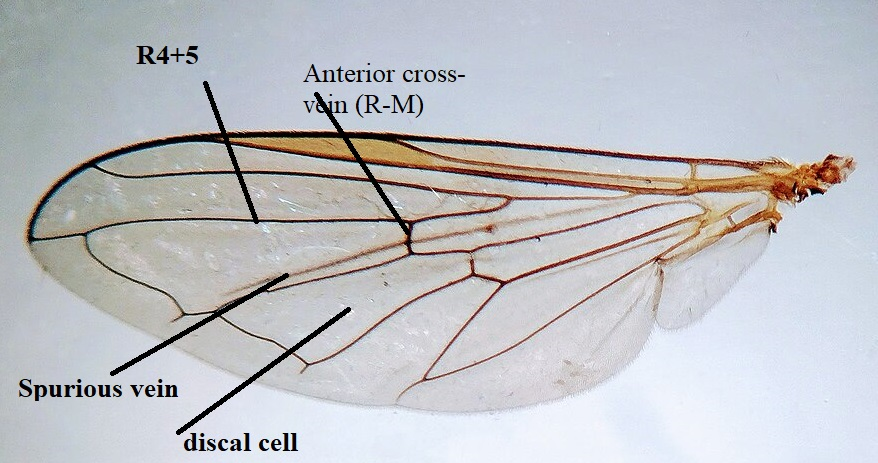
Wing

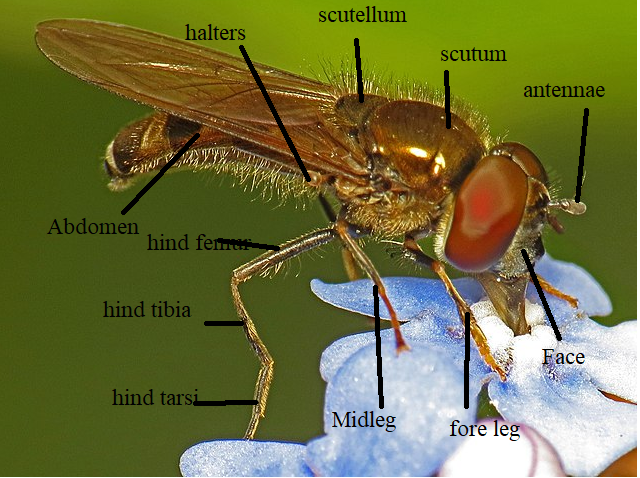
Body

== Distribution ==
The species occurs in northern Europe, from Norway into Karelian Russia and on into Asia to eastern Siberia, as well as in North America from Alaska south to California and Colorado (where it occurs at 3-4000 m elevation).

== Ecology ==
Like other species in its genus, the species can remain nearly motionless in flight. Known larvae feed on aphids.
