= Platycheirus aurolateralis =

Scientific classification
- Kingdom: Animalia
- Phylum: Arthropoda
- Clade: Pancrustacea
- Class: Insecta
- Order: Diptera
- Family: Syrphidae
- Genus: Platycheirus
- Subgenus: Platycheirus
- Species: P. aurolateralis

Binomial name
- Platycheirus aurolateralis Stubbs, 2002

Species of fly

Platycheirus aurolateralis is a species of hoverfly. Only described in 2002, it has so far only been recorded in southern Britain.
