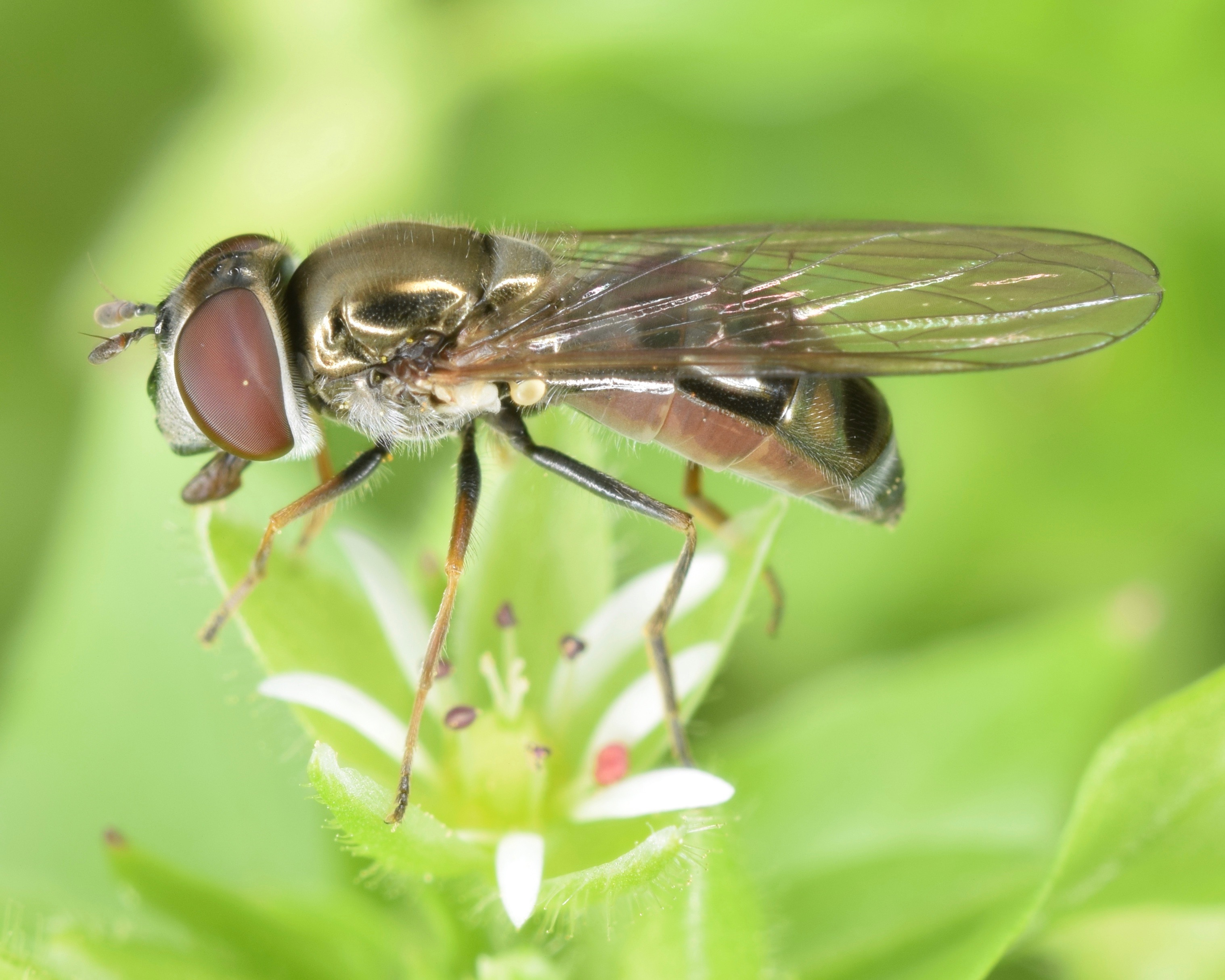
- Female

Scientific classification
- Kingdom: Animalia
- Phylum: Arthropoda
- Clade: Pancrustacea
- Class: Insecta
- Order: Diptera
- Family: Syrphidae
- Genus: Platycheirus
- Subgenus: Platycheirus
- Species: P. obscurus

Binomial name
- Platycheirus obscurus (Say, 1824)
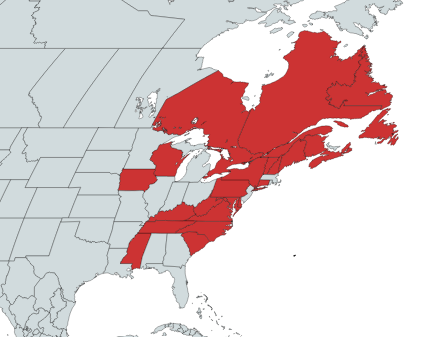
- Range map P. obscurus map 2024

Synonyms
- Melanostoma nitidiventris Curran, 1931; Melanostoma ontario Davidson, 1922; Melanostoma rostrata Bigot, 1884; Melanostoma rufipes Bigot, 1884; Syrphus obscurus Say, 1824

= Platycheirus obscurus =

Species of fly

Platycheirus obscurus is a species of syrphid fly in the family Syrphidae.
