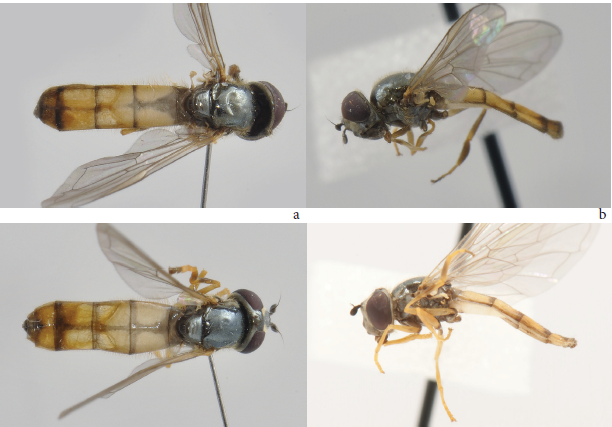
- Male above, female below

Scientific classification
- Kingdom: Animalia
- Phylum: Arthropoda
- Clade: Pancrustacea
- Class: Insecta
- Order: Diptera
- Family: Syrphidae
- Genus: Platycheirus
- Subgenus: Platycheirus
- Species: P. modestus

Binomial name
- Platycheirus modestus Ide 1926

= Platycheirus modestus =

Species of fly

Platycheirus modestus , the yellow sedgesitter, is an uncommon species of syrphid fly observed throughout Northern North America. Hoverflies can remain nearly motionless in flight. The adults are also known as flower flies for they are usually found on flowers from which they get both energy-giving nectar and protein-rich pollen. Larvae are aphid predators.

== Description Male ==
For terminology see

- Spheight's Key to Genera of European Syrphidae with Morphological terms.
- Glossary of morphological terminology of adult Syrphidae, Steenis

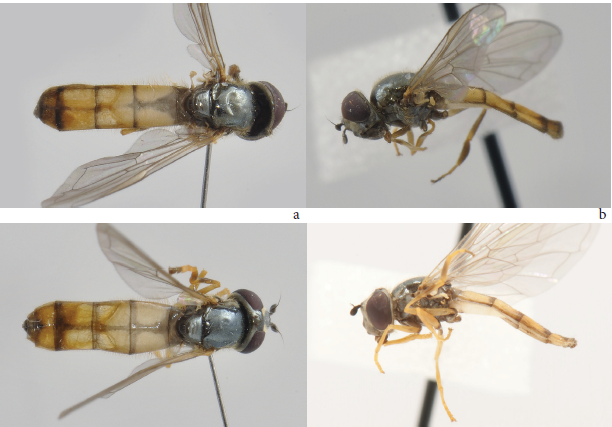
Platycheirus modestus male above Figure 1 Andrew Young

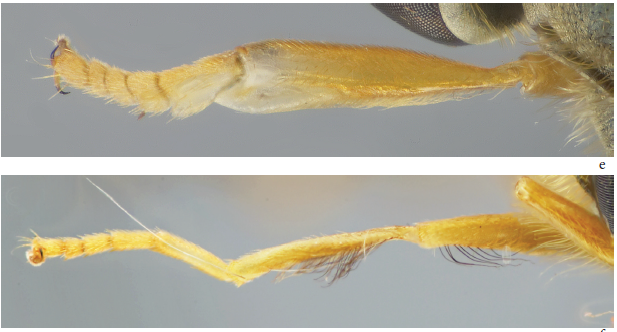
Platycheirus modestus male legs, front above, middle below. Figure 2 Andrew Young

Length: 6.2–7.3 mm (0.24–0.29 in) The face is shining black and covered with dense grey powder, except for the bare tubercle. The legs are mostly pale. The front tibia is broadened from the base to the tip, ending in a pointed rear angle. The first front tarsomere (T1, see general anatomy) is widened posteriorly, slightly narrower than the tip of the tibia, and approximately twice as long as it is wide. The remaining front tarsomeres are slightly narrower than the first. The middle femur, on its apical quarter (see lower leg figure 2), has a row of 6–8 long, weak, black setae that are strongly curved backward. The first rear tarsomere is swollen (see Figure 1,b). The scutum and scutellum are shining black, with yellow powder present laterally (figure a). Long yellow hairs are located near the wings. The wings are entirely microtrichose, meaning they are covered with fine hairs. The tergites (abdominal segments) 2–5 are predominantly yellow. Segment 2 has black lines at the front and rear, along with a dark triangular marking in the middle of the front. Segments 3–5 feature thin dark margins at the rear and dark triangular markings in the middle of the front (see figure 1 a & b).

General Anatomy click to enlarge

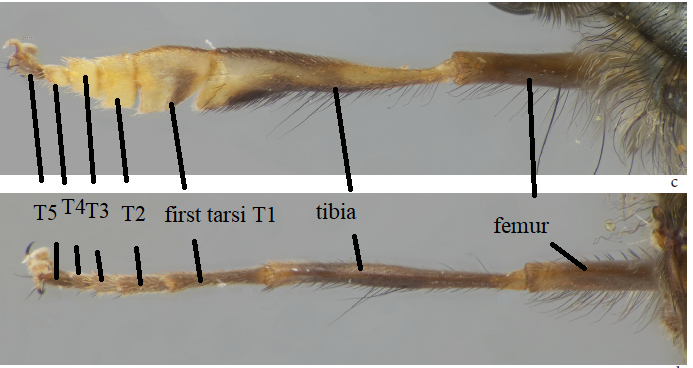
Legs

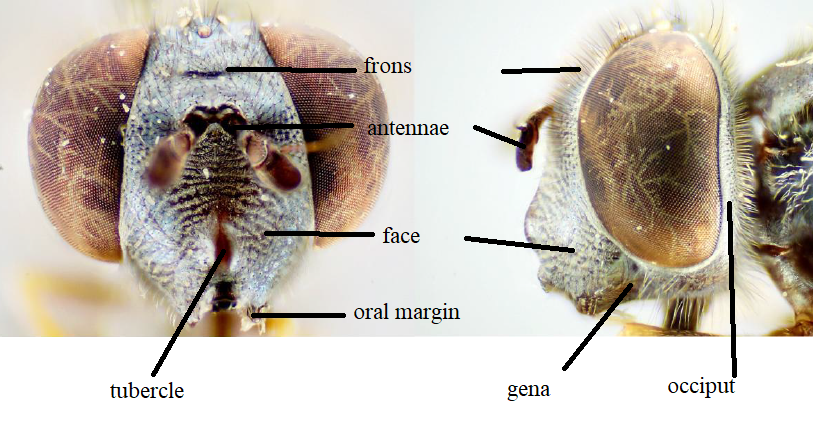
Head

Wing

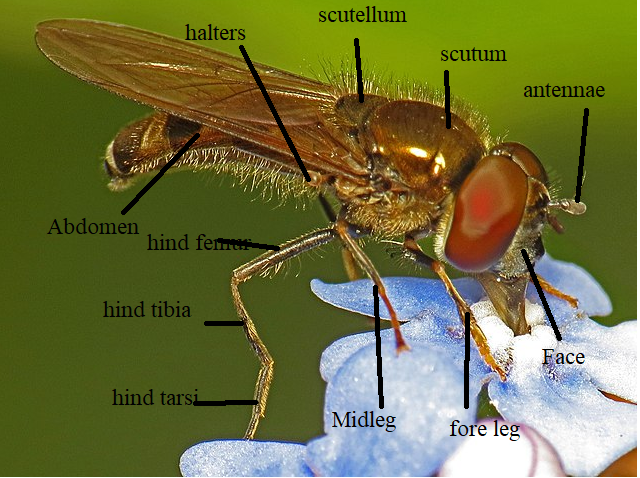
Body
A19
