= Platycheirus nearcticus =

Scientific classification
- Kingdom: Animalia
- Phylum: Arthropoda
- Clade: Pancrustacea
- Class: Insecta
- Order: Diptera
- Family: Syrphidae
- Genus: Platycheirus
- Subgenus: Platycheirus
- Species: P. nearcticus

Binomial name
- Platycheirus nearcticus Vockeroth, 1990

Species of fly

Platycheirus nearcticus, the Nearctic broadhand sedgesitter, is a common species of syrphid fly observed in mainly in northeastern North America but scattered more broadly across the continent. Hoverflies can remain nearly motionless in flight. The adults are also known as flower flies for they are commonly found on flowers from which they get both energy-giving nectar and protein rich pollen. Larvae are aphid predators.
