= Platycheirus ramsaerensis =

Scientific classification
- Kingdom: Animalia
- Phylum: Arthropoda
- Clade: Pancrustacea
- Class: Insecta
- Order: Diptera
- Family: Syrphidae
- Genus: Platycheirus
- Subgenus: Platycheirus
- Species: P. ramsaerensis

Binomial name
- Platycheirus ramsaerensis de Tiefenau, Maibach & Speight, 1990

Species of fly

Platycheirus ramsaerensis is a Palearctic species of hoverfly. It is found along the parts of northern Europe that face the Atlantic. It is a member of the Platycheirus clypeatus group
