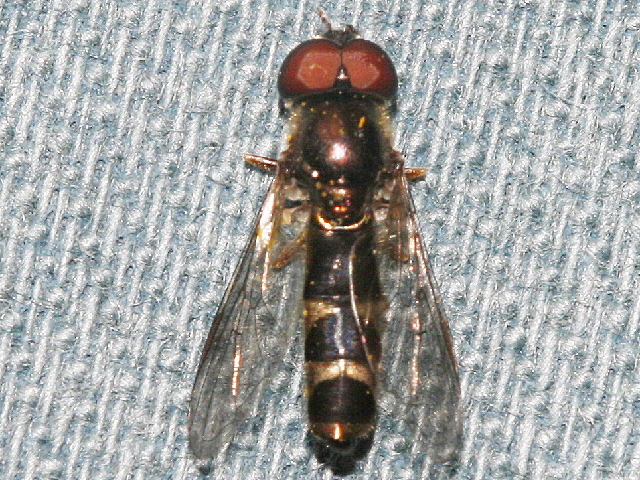

Scientific classification
- Kingdom: Animalia
- Phylum: Arthropoda
- Clade: Pancrustacea
- Class: Insecta
- Order: Diptera
- Family: Syrphidae
- Genus: Platycheirus
- Species: P. pictipes

Binomial name
- Platycheirus pictipes Bigot, 1884

Synonyms
- Volucella bombylans evecta Johnson Malloch, 1922

= Platycheirus pictipes =

Species of fly

Platycheirus pictipes, the cobalt sedgesitter, is a common species of syrphid fly observed in Western North America and across Canada. Hoverflies can remain nearly motionless in flight. The adults are also known as flower flies for they are commonly found on flowers from which they get both energy-giving nectar and protein-rich pollen. Larvae are aphid predators.
