= Platycheirus thompsoni =

Scientific classification
- Kingdom: Animalia
- Phylum: Arthropoda
- Clade: Pancrustacea
- Class: Insecta
- Order: Diptera
- Family: Syrphidae
- Genus: Platycheirus
- Subgenus: Platycheirus
- Species: P. thompsoni

Binomial name
- Platycheirus thompsoni Vockeroth, 1990

Species of fly

Platycheirus thompsoni, or Thompson's sedgesitter, is an uncommon species of syrphid fly observed in northeastern North America. Hoverflies can remain nearly motionless in flight. The adults are also known as flower flies, for they are commonly found on flowers, from which they get both energy-giving nectar and protein-rich pollen. Larvae are aphid predators.
