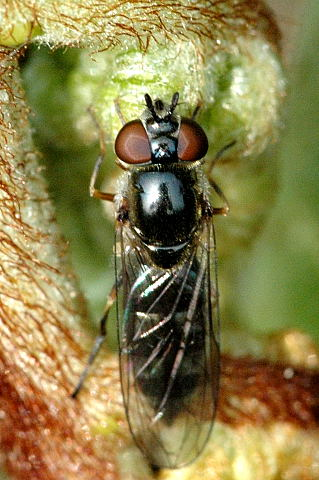
- Platycheirus clypeatus female

Scientific classification
- Kingdom: Animalia
- Phylum: Arthropoda
- Clade: Pancrustacea
- Class: Insecta
- Order: Diptera
- Family: Syrphidae
- Subfamily: Syrphinae
- Tribe: Bacchini
- Genus: Platycheirus; Lepeletier & Serville, 1828

Synonyms
- Platychirus authors

= Platycheirus =

Genus of flies

Platycheirus is a large genus of hoverflies. They are also called sedgesitters. The genus Platycheirus was established in 1828 by Lepeletier and Serville, with the type specimen of Syrphus scutatus Meigen. This genus is primarily Holarctic in distribution, encompassing 70 species within the Nearctic region. Notably, at least 23 of these Nearctic species are also found in the Palearctic realm, with their approximately 110 species.The distribution of Platycheirus is markedly boreal, with half of the 70 Nearctic species in the Yukon, Northwest Territories, or Alaska. The genus is widespread from Mexico, Central and South America, Europe, Asia, Southeast Asia, Platycheirus are not found in Australia, Indonesia and New Guinea. The genus has a variety of food choices for larvae, ranging from generalized aphid predators to species that specialize in feeding on one or two specific aphid species. Most are feeding within the ground layer of leaf litter.

== Characteristics ==
For terminology and a key to European Syrphidae see Speight.

Platycheirus are slender, small to medium-sized flies that are often covered in fine hairs. They are mostly black or metallic green, and they may have yellow, reddish, or whitish-yellow spots on their abdomens. These flies do not have any bristles.

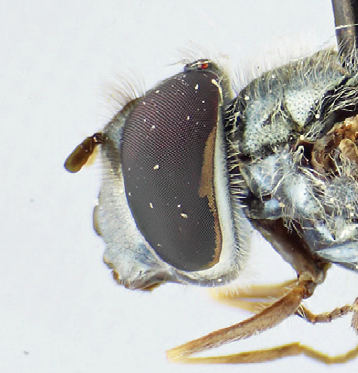
Platycheirus head

The head of a Platycheirus is somewhat rounded and is usually a bit wider than it is tall. It is also slightly wider than the thorax, with a small indentation at the back. The epistoma, which is the lower part of the face, is black and has a central knob. The face is often slightly recessed and has a small bump. The upper edge of the mouth is slightly extended.

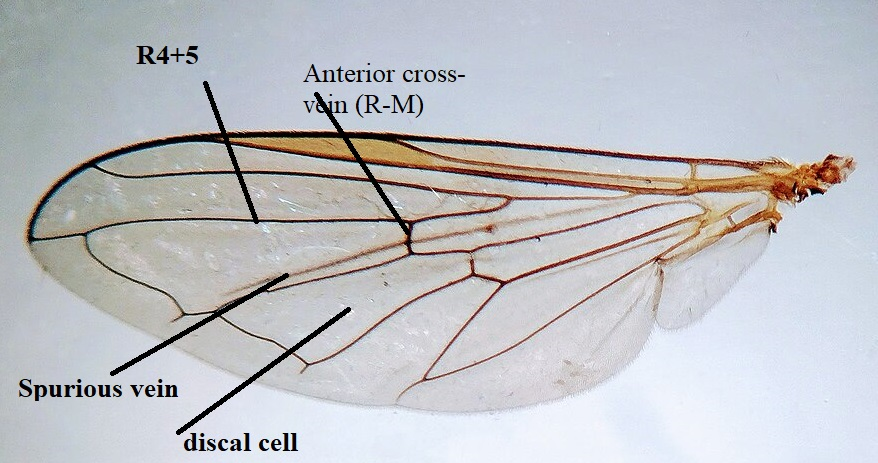
Platycheirus wing

The antennae are placed high on the face, above the middle, and the third segment of the antennae is longer than it is wide. The arista, which is a part of the antennae, is thickened in its base and has tiny hairs. The eyes are smooth and are holoptic in males, meaning they meet in the middle. The wings have a cross-vein (R-M) located before the middle of the discal cell. There is a distinct but not very strong spurious vein.

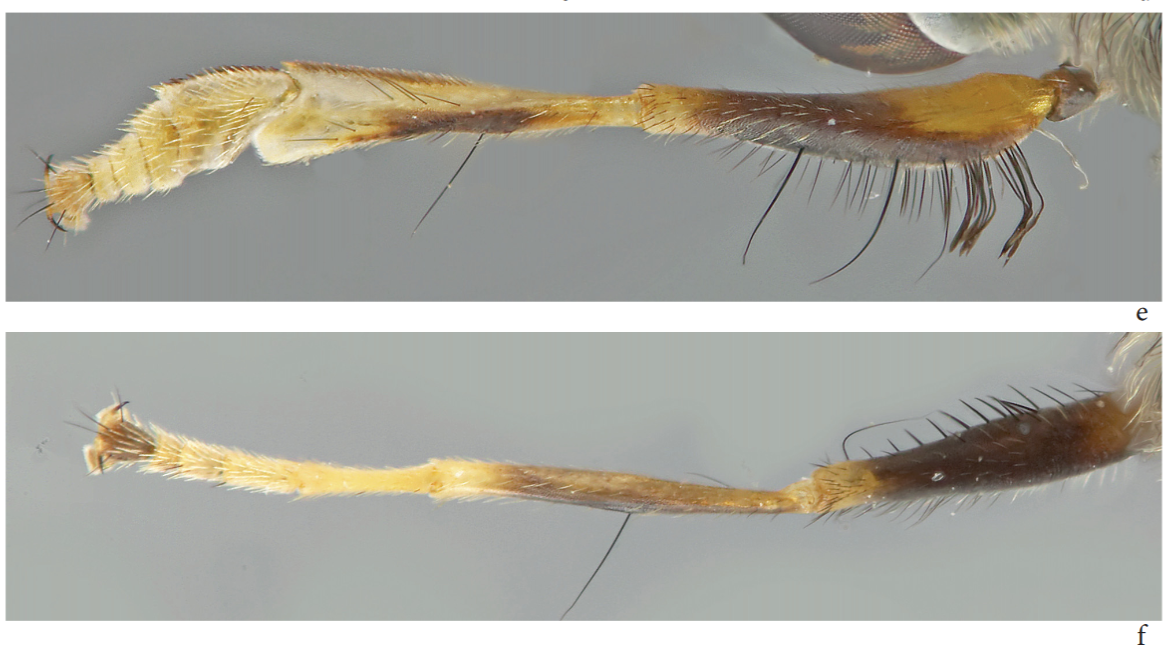
P. urakawensis leg

The legs of Platycheirus are somewhat slender. The hind metatarsi are thickened and show secondary sexual characteristics in males. This means that the front tibia and tarsi of males can be dilated in various ways and may have special colors. Sometimes, only the tarsi are dilated.

Males can be identified by their legs, especially the front legs. Some females have unique markings that help with identification, but many females are harder to identify, and some may even be impossible to distinguish.

== Species by subgenus ==
Subgenus: Carposcalis Enderlein, 1938

- P. bertrandi (Kolenati, 1913)
- Platycheirus chalconota (Philippi, 1865)
- P. confusus (Curran, 1925)
- Platycheirus ecuadoriensis (Fluke, 1945)
- Platycheirus edwardsi (Shannon & Aubertin, 1933)
- P. fenestratum (Macquart, 1842)
- Platycheirus inflatifrons (Fluke, 1945)
- P. longigena (Enderlein, 1912)
- P. lundbecki (Collin, 1931)
- P. lundbladi Enderlein, 1940 - Juan Fernández Islands
- Platycheirus meyeri (Fluke, 1945)
- Platycheirus punctulatus (Wulp, 1888)
- Platycheirus sabulicola (Vockeroth, 1990)
- Platycheirus saltana (Enderlein, 1938)
- Platycheirus scutiger (Fluke, 1945)
- Platycheirus squamulae (Curran, 1922)
- P. stegnus (Say, 1829)
- P. trichopus (Thomson, 1869)
- P. willistoni (Goot, 1964)

Subgenus: Eocheilosia Hull, 1949

- P. antipodus (Hull, 949b)
- P. captalis (Miller, 1924)
- P. clarkei Miller, 1921
- P. cunninghami (Miller, 1921)
- P. fulvipes (Miller, 1924)
- P. harrisi (Miller, 1921)
- P. howesii (Miller, 1921)
- P. huttoni Thompson in Thompson & Vockeroth, 1989
- P. leptospermi (Miller, 1921)
- P. lignudus Miller, 1921
- P. myersii (Miller, 1924)
- P. notatus (Bigot, 1884)
- P. ronanus (Miller, 1921)

Subgenus: Pachysphyria Enderlein, 1938

- P. ambiguus (Fallén, 1817)
- P. barkalovi Mutin, 1999
- P. brunnifrons Nielsen, 2004
- P. dexter (Harris, 1780)
- P. immaculatus Ohara, 1980

Subgenus: Platycheirus Lepeletier & Serville, 1828

- P. abruzzensis van der Goot, 1969
- P. aeratus Coquillett, 1900
- P. albimanus (Fabricius, 1781)
- P. amplus (Curran, 1927)
- P. angustatus (Zetterstedt, 1843)
- P. angustipes Goeldlin, 1974
- P. aurolateralis Stubbs, 2002
- P. carinatus Curran, 1927
- P. chilosia (Curran, 1927)
- P. ciliatus Bigot, 1884
- P. ciliger Loew, 1856
- P. cintoensis van der Goot, 1961
- P. clypeatus (Meigen, 1822)
- P. coerulescens (Williston, 1887)
- P. complicatus (Becker, 1889)
- P. concinnus (Snow, 1895)
- P. coracinus Vockeroth, 1986
- P. cyaneus (Müller, 1764)
- P. discimanus (Loew, 1871)
- P. europaeus Goeldlin, Maibach & Speight, 1990
- P. fasciculatus (Loew, 1856)
- P. femineum Curran, 1931
- P. flabella Hull, 1944
- P. fulviventris (Macquart, 1829)
- P. groenlandicus Curran, 1927
- P. hesperinus Vockeroth, 1986
- P. hispidipes Vockeroth, 1986
- P. holarcticus Vockeroth, 1986
- P. hyperboreus (Staeger, 1845)
- P. immarginatus (Zetterstedt, 1849)
- P. inversus Ide, 1926
- P. islandicus (Ringdahl, 1930)
- P. jaerensis Nielsen, 1971
- P. kelloggi (Snow, 1895)
- P. kittilaensis Dusek & Láska, 1982
- P. laskai Nielsen, 1999
- P. lata (Curran, 1922)
- P. latimanus (Wahlberg, 1845)
- P. latitarsis Vockeroth, 1986
- P. luteipennis (Curran, 1925)
- P. manicatus (Meigen, 1822)
- P. melanopsis Loew, 1856
- P. modestus Ide, 1926
- P. monticola Jones, 1917
- P. muelleri Marcuzzi, 1941
- P. naso (Walker, 1949)
- P. nearcticus Vockeroth, 1986
- P. nielseni Vockeroth, 1986
- P. nigrofemoratus (Kanervo, 1934)
- P. nodosus Curran, 1923
- P. normae Fluke, 1939
- P. obscurus (Say, 1824)
- P. occidentalis Curran, 1927
- P. occultus Goeldlin, Maibach & Speight, 1990
- P. octavus Vockeroth, 1986
- P. orarius Vockeroth, 1986
- P. pacilus (Walker, 1849)
- P. parmatus Rondani, 1857
- P. parvus (Williston, 1882)
- P. peltatoides Curran, 1923
- P. peltatus (Meigen, 1822)
- P. perpallidus (Verrall, 1901)
- P. pilatus Vockeroth, 1986
- P. podagrata (Zetterstedt, 1838)
- P. podagratus (Zetterstedt, 1838)
- P. protrusus Vockeroth, 1986
- P. quadratus (Say, 1823)
- P. ramsaerensis Goeldlin, Maibach & Speight, 1990
- P. rufigaster Vockeroth, 1986
- P. rufimaculatus Vockeroth, 1986
- P. scamboides Curran, 1927
- P. scambus (Stæger, 1843)
- P. scutatus (Meigen, 1822)
- P. setitarsis Vockeroth, 1986
- P. speighti Doczkal, Stuke & Goeldlin, 2002
- P. spinipes Vockeroth, 1986
- P. splendidus Rotheray, 1998
- P. squamulae (Curran, 1922)
- P. stegnoides Vockeroth, 1986
- P. sticticus (Meigen, 1822)
- P. striatus Vockeroth, 1986
- P. subordinatus (Becker, 1915)
- P. tarsalis (Schummel, 1836)
- P. tatricus Dusek & Láska, 1982
- P. tenebrosus Coquillett, 1900
- P. thompsoni Vockeroth, 1986
- P. thylax Hull, 1944
- P. transfugus (Zetterstedt, 1838)
- P. urakawensis (Matsumura, 1919)
- P. varipes Curran, 1923
- P. woodi Vockeroth, 1986

Subgenus: Pseudoplatychirus Doesburg, 1955

- P. glupovi Barkalov, 2007
- P. peteri Doesburg, 1955
Subgenus: Pyrophaena Schiner, 1860 - often considered a full genus.
- P. granditarsus (Forster, 1771)
- P. rosarum (Fabricius, 1787)

== Platycheirus alphabetic list ==
- Platycheirus abruzzensis (Goot, 1969)
- Platycheirus aeratus (Coquillett, 1900)
- Platycheirus albimanus (Fabricius, 1781)
- Platycheirus alpigenus (Barkalov & Nielsen, 2008)
- Platycheirus altaicus (Barkalov & Nielsen, 2008)
- Platycheirus altomontis (Merlin & Nielsen, 2004)
- Platycheirus altotibeticus (Nielsen, 2001)
- Platycheirus ambiguus (Fallén, 1817)
- Platycheirus amplus (Curran, 1927)
- Platycheirus angustatus (Zetterstedt, 1843)
- Platycheirus angustipes (Goeldlin, 1974)
- Platycheirus angustitarsis (Kanervo, 1934)
- Platycheirus antennatum
- Platycheirus antipoda (Hull, 1949)
- Platycheirus arat (Violovich, 1975)
- Platycheirus argentatus (Ringdahl, 1936)
- Platycheirus asioambiguus (Skufjin, 1987)
- Platycheirus ater (Curran, 1925)
- Platycheirus atlasi (Kassebeer, 1998)
- Platycheirus atratus (Barkalov & Nielsen, 2008)
- Platycheirus aurolateralis (Stubbs, 2002)
- Platycheirus barkalovi (Mutin, 1999)
- Platycheirus bartschi (Barkalov & Nielsen, 2012)
- Platycheirus beringiensis (Barkalov & Mutin, 2014)
- Platycheirus bertrandi (Austen, 1913)
- Platycheirus bidentatus (Huo & Zheng, 2003)
- Platycheirus bimaculatus (Roser, 1840)
- Platycheirus brunnifrons (Nielsen, 2004)
- Platycheirus caesius (Nielsen & Stuke, 2004)
- Platycheirus captalis (Miller, 1924)
- Platycheirus carinatus (Curran, 1927)
- Platycheirus cejensis (Kuznetzov, 1987)
- Platycheirus celsus (Violovich, 1975)
- Platycheirus chalconota (Philippi, 1865)
- Platycheirus cheilosiaeformis (Smit & Barkalov, 2008)
- Platycheirus chilosia (Curran, 1922)
- Platycheirus ciliatus (Bigot, 1884)
- Platycheirus ciliger (Loew, 1856)
- Platycheirus cintoensis (Goot, 1961)
- Platycheirus clarkei (Miller, 1924)
- Platycheirus clausseni (Nielsen, 2004)
- Platycheirus clypeatus (Meigen, 1822)
- Platycheirus coerulescens (Williston, 1887)
- Platycheirus complicatus (Becker, 1889)
- Platycheirus concinnus (Snow, 1895) .
- Platycheirus confusus (Curran, 1925)
- Platycheirus coracinus (Vockeroth, 1990) .
- Platycheirus cryophilus (Nielsen, 2007)
- Platycheirus cunninghami (Miller, 1924)
- Platycheirus dexter (Harris, 1780)
- Platycheirus discimanus (Loew, 1871)
- Platycheirus dudkoi (Barkalov & Nielsen, 2009)
- Platycheirus ecuadoriensis (Fluke, 1945)
- Platycheirus edwardsi (Shannon & Aubertin, 1933)
- Platycheirus europaeus (Goeldlin, Maibach & Speight, 1990)
- Platycheirus fallax (Barkalov & Nielsen, 2008)
- Platycheirus fasciculatus (Loew, 1856)
- Platycheirus femineum (Curran, 1931)
- Platycheirus fenestrata (Macquart, 1842)
- Platycheirus ferrumitarsis (Steenis, Young, Ssymank, Wu, Shiao & Skevington, 2019)
- Platycheirus fimbriatus (Loew, 1871)
- Platycheirus flabella (Hull, 1944)
- Platycheirus flavipes (Szilády, 1940)
- Platycheirus formosanus (Shiraki, 1930)
- Platycheirus freyeri (Heer, 1849)
- Platycheirus fulvipes (Miller, 1924)
- Platycheirus fulviventris (Macquart, 1829)
- Platycheirus fumosus (Violovich, 1982)
- Platycheirus fuscitarsis (Barkalov & Nielsen, 2007)
- Platycheirus geminatus (Heer, 1849)
- Platycheirus glupovi (Barkalov, 2007)
- Platycheirus goeldlini (Nielsen, 2004)
- Platycheirus granditarsus (Forster, 1770)
- Platycheirus groenlandicus (Curran, 1927)
- Platycheirus gunillae (Barkalov & Nielsen, 2008)
- Platycheirus haidingeri (Heer, 1849)
- Platycheirus harrisi (Miller, 1921)
- Platycheirus hesperius (Vockeroth, 1990)
- Platycheirus himalayensis (Brunetti, 1950)
- Platycheirus hirtipes (Kanervo, 1938)
- Platycheirus hispidipes (Vockeroth, 1990)
- Platycheirus holarcticus (Vockeroth, 1990)
- Platycheirus howesii (Miller, 1921)
- Platycheirus huttoni (Thompson, 1972)
- Platycheirus hyperboreus (Staeger, 1845)
- Platycheirus immaculatus (Ôhara, 1980)
- Platycheirus immarginatus (Zetterstedt, 1849)
- Platycheirus inflatifrons (Fluke, 1945)
- Platycheirus infumatus (Heer, 1849)
- Platycheirus inversus (Ide 1926)
- Platycheirus isshikii (Matsumura, 1916)
- Platycheirus jaerensis (Nielsen, 1971)
- Platycheirus jakuticus (Violovich, 1978)
- Platycheirus kashkarovi (Violovich, 1978)
- Platycheirus kashmiricus (Nielsen, 2004)
- Platycheirus katunicus (Skufjin, 1987)
- Platycheirus kelloggi (Snow, 1895)
- Platycheirus kirgizorum (Ssymank & Nielsen, 2012)
- Platycheirus kittilaensis (Dušek & Láska, 1982)
- Platycheirus laskai (Nielsen, 1999)
- Platycheirus lata (Curran, 1922)
- Platycheirus latens (Mutin, 1999)
- Platycheirus latimanus (Wahlberg, 1844)
- Platycheirus latitarsis (Vockeroth 1990)
- Platycheirus leptospermi (Miller, 1921)
- Platycheirus lethaeus (Melander, 1949) fossil
- Platycheirus lignudus (Miller, 1921)
- Platycheirus longicornis (Peck, 1979)
- Platycheirus longigena (Enderlein, 1912)
- Platycheirus lundbecki (Collin, 1931)
- Platycheirus lundbladi (Enderlein, 1938)
- Platycheirus luteipennis (Curran, 1925)
- Platycheirus macroantennae (He, 1992)
- Platycheirus macrocephalus (Bagatshanova, 1980)
- Platycheirus magadanensis (Mutin, 1999)
- Platycheirus manicatus (Meigen, 1822)
- Platycheirus marokkanus (Kassebeer, 1998)
- Platycheirus melanopsis (Loew, 1856)
- Platycheirus meridimontanus (Nielsen, 2004)
- Platycheirus metallicus (Barkalov & Nielsen, 2004)
- Platycheirus meyeri (Fluke, 1945)
- Platycheirus migriaulii (Stuke & Nielsen, 2002)
- Platycheirus modestus (Ide, 1926)
- Platycheirus mongolicus (Stackelberg, 1974)
- Platycheirus monticola (Jones, 1917)
- Platycheirus muelleri (Marcuzzi, 1941)
- Platycheirus myersii (Miller, 1924)
- Platycheirus naso (Walker, 1849)
- Platycheirus nearcticus (Vockeroth 1990)
- Platycheirus neoperpallidus (Young, 2016)
- Platycheirus nielseni (Vockeroth, 1990)
- Platycheirus nigritarsis (Ssymank & Nielsen, 2012)
- Platycheirus nigritus (Huo, Ren & Zheng, 2007)
- Platycheirus nigrofemoratus (Kanervo, 1934)
- Platycheirus nodosus (Curran, 1923)
- Platycheirus normae (Fluke 1939)
- Platycheirus notata (Bigot, 1884)
- Platycheirus nudipes (Becker, 1900)
- Platycheirus obscurus (Say, 1824)
- Platycheirus occultus (Goeldlin, Maibach & Speight, 1990)
- Platycheirus octavus (Vockeroth, 1990)
- Platycheirus orarius (Vockeroth, 1990)
- Platycheirus oreadis (Vockeroth, 1990)
- Platycheirus orientalis (Skuf'in, 1992)
- Platycheirus pacilus (Walker, 1849)
- Platycheirus pamiricus (Barkalov & Nielsen, 2009)
- Platycheirus parmatus (Rondani, 1857)
- Platycheirus parvus (Williston, 1882)
- Platycheirus peckae (Bagatshanova, 1980)
- Platycheirus peltatoides (Curran, 1923)
- Platycheirus peltatus (Meigen, 1822)
- Platycheirus pennipes (Ôhara, 1980)
- Platycheirus perpallidus (Verrall, 1901)
- Platycheirus perpes (Steenis, Young, Ssymank, Wu, Shiao & Skevington, 2019)
- Platycheirus persistens (Hull, 1938)
- Platycheirus peteri (Doesburg, 1955)
- Platycheirus pictipes (Bigot, 1884)
- Platycheirus pilatus (Vockeroth, 1990)
- Platycheirus platygastris (Loew, 1871)
- Platycheirus podagratus (Zetterstedt, 1838)
- Platycheirus protrusus (Vockeroth, 1990)
- Platycheirus pulcherum (Mutin, 1999)
- Platycheirus pullatus (Vockeroth, 1990)
- Platycheirus punctulatus (Wulp, 1888)
- Platycheirus pusillus (Nielsen & Romig 2010)
- Platycheirus quadratus (Say, 1823)
- Platycheirus ramsarensis (Goeldlin, Maibach & Speight, 1990)
- Platycheirus rarus (Violovich, 1978)
- Platycheirus reynoldsi (Shannon & Aubertin, 1933)
- Platycheirus ronana (Miller, 1921)
- Platycheirus rosarum (Fabricius, 1787)
- Platycheirus rufigaster (Vockeroth, 1990)
- Platycheirus rufimaculatus (Vockeroth, 1990)
- Platycheirus russatus (Vockeroth, 1990)
- Platycheirus sabulicola (Vockeroth, 1990)
- Platycheirus saltana (Enderlein, 1938)
- Platycheirus scamboides (Curran, 1927)
- Platycheirus scambus (Staeger, 1843)
- Platycheirus scutatus (Meigen, 1822)
- Platycheirus scutiger (Fluke, 1945)
- Platycheirus setipes (Vockeroth, 1990)
- Platycheirus setitarsis (Vockeroth, 1990)
- Platycheirus shantar (Mutin, 2021)
- Platycheirus sibiricus (Barkalov & Nielsen, 2007)
- Platycheirus sigiktae (Mutin, 1999)
- Platycheirus silesicus (Enderlein, 1938)
- Platycheirus similis (Barkalov & Nielsen, 2007)
- Platycheirus speighti (Dockzal, Stuke & Goeldlin)
- Platycheirus spinipes (Vockeroth, 1990)
- Platycheirus splendidus (Rotheray 1998)
- Platycheirus squamulae (Curran, 1922)
- Platycheirus stegnoides (Vockeroth, 1990)
- Platycheirus stegnus (Say, 1829)
- Platycheirus sticticus (Meigen, 1822)
- Platycheirus striatus (Vockeroth, 1990)
- Platycheirus subambiguus (Nielsen, 2004)
- Platycheirus subordinatus (Becker, 1915)
- Platycheirus tarsalis (Schummel, 1837)
- Platycheirus tatricus (Dušek & Láska, 1982)
- Platycheirus tenebrosus (Coquillett, 1900)
- Platycheirus thompsoni (Vockeroth, 1990)
- Platycheirus thylax (Hull, 1944)
- Platycheirus torei (Barkalov, 2013)
- Platycheirus transbaikalicus (Barkalov & Nielsen, 2009)
- Platycheirus transfugus (Zetterstedt, 1838)
- Platycheirus trichopus (Thomson, 1869)
- Platycheirus troll (Mutin, 1999)
- Platycheirus tuvaensis (Barkalov & Nielsen, 2008)
- Platycheirus urakawensis (Matsumura,1919)
- Platycheirus varipes (Curran, 1923)
- Platycheirus walkeri (Lynch Arribálzaga, 1892)
- Platycheirus willistoni (Goot, 1964)
- Platycheirus woodi (Vockeroth, 1990)
- Platycheirus yukonensis (Vockeroth, 1990)

== Diagnostic keys ==
- Key to Nearctic Platycheirus
- Diptera fauna of New Zealand
- Key to the platycheirus species of Taiwan plus DNA sequencing on 63 species.
- Key to "melanostomini" of the Neotropical region (1945, using outdated generic concept)
- A 1927 Key to North American species of males of the genus Platycheirus
- Key to the insects to Russian Far East (Platycheirus starts on page 363). In Russian
- The genus Platycheirus of Japan
- Description, keys and maps to the Nearctic species of Platycheirus.
- List and short description of European species
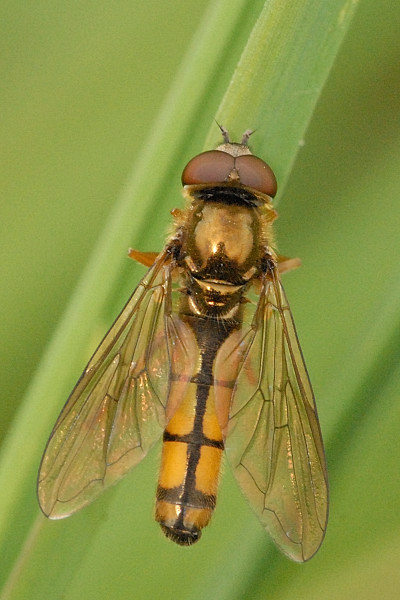
Platycheirus fulviventris male

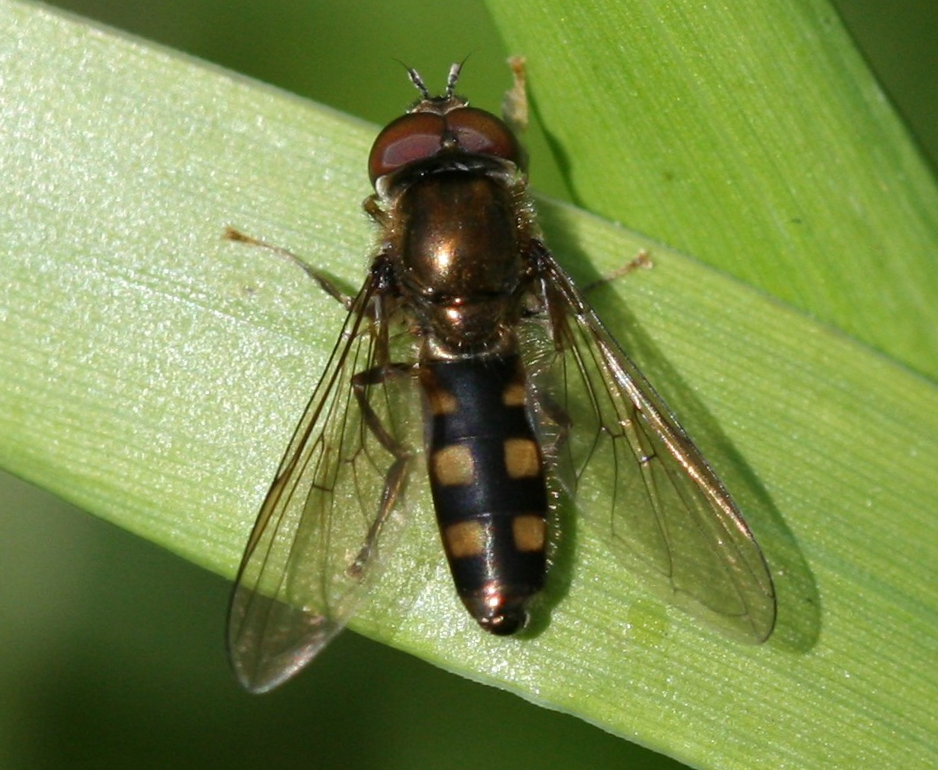
Platycheirus peltatus male

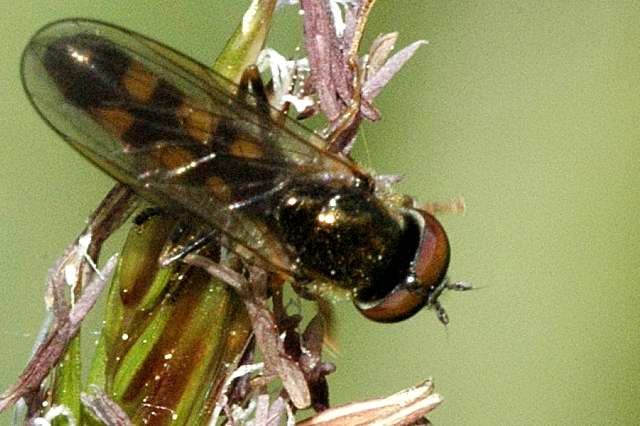
Platycheirus clypeatus male

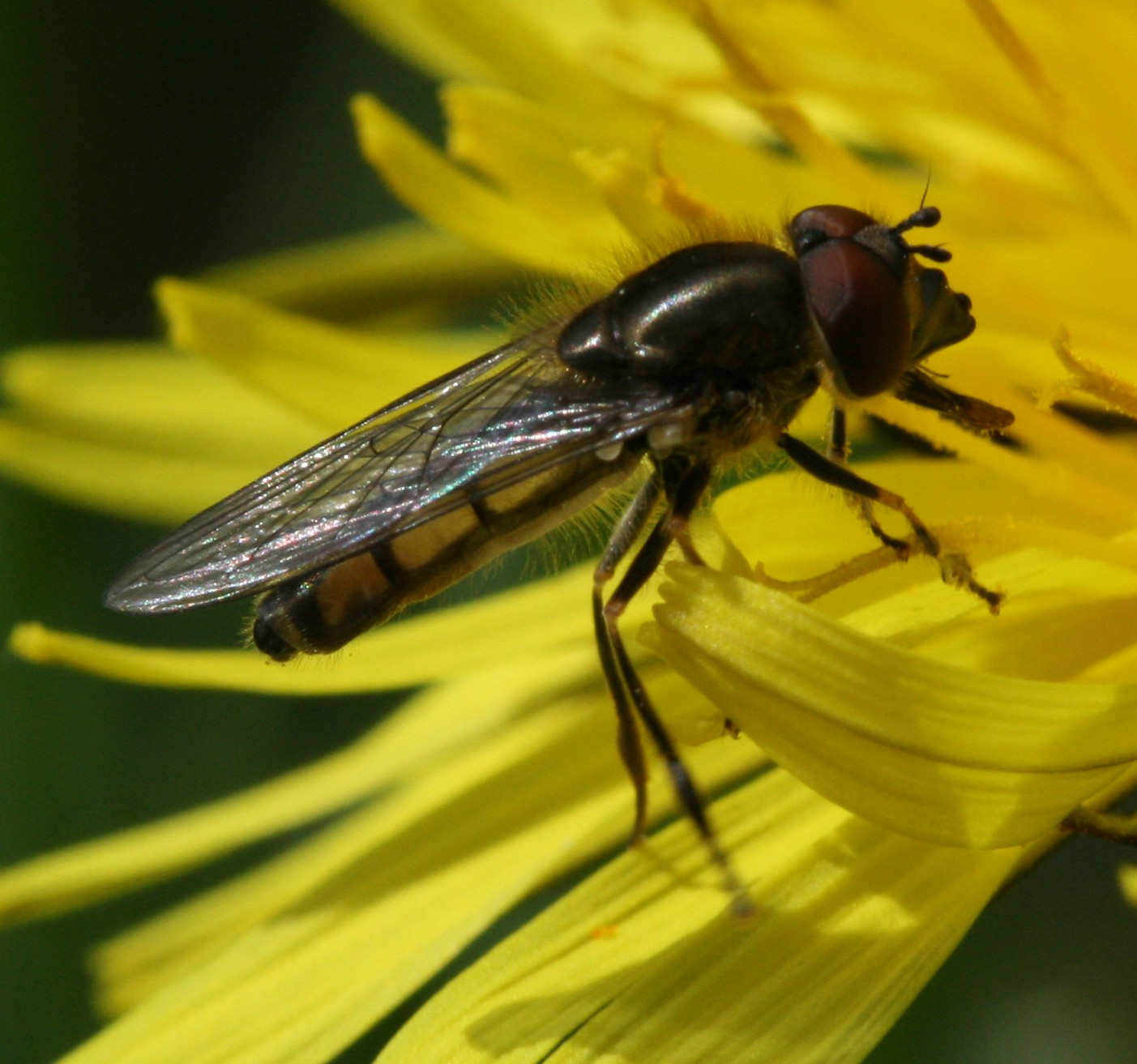
Platycheirus manicatus male

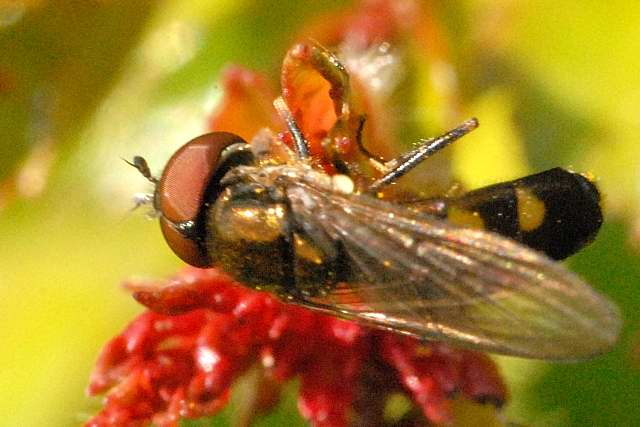
Platycheirus splendidus male

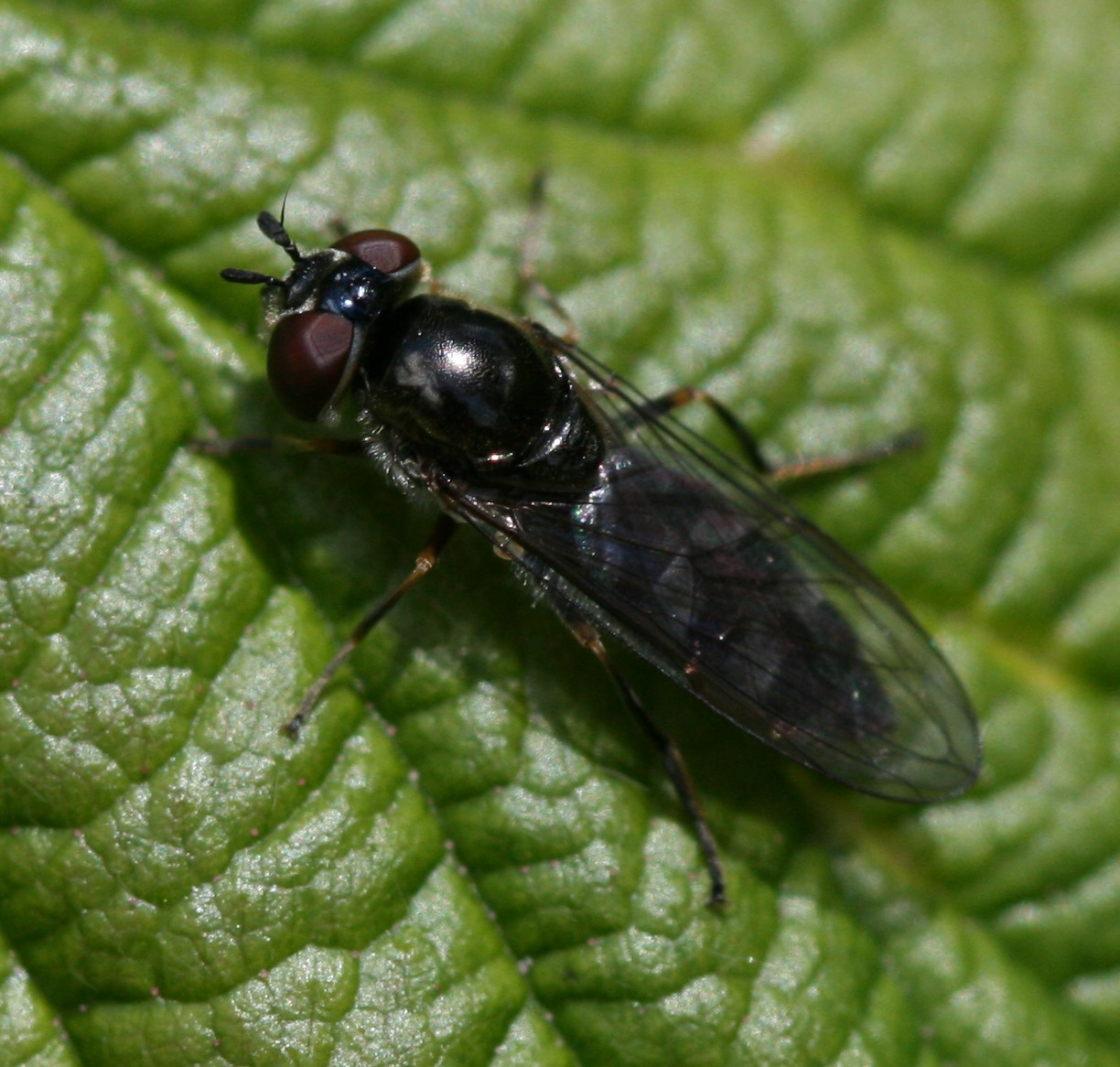
Platycheirus albimanus female

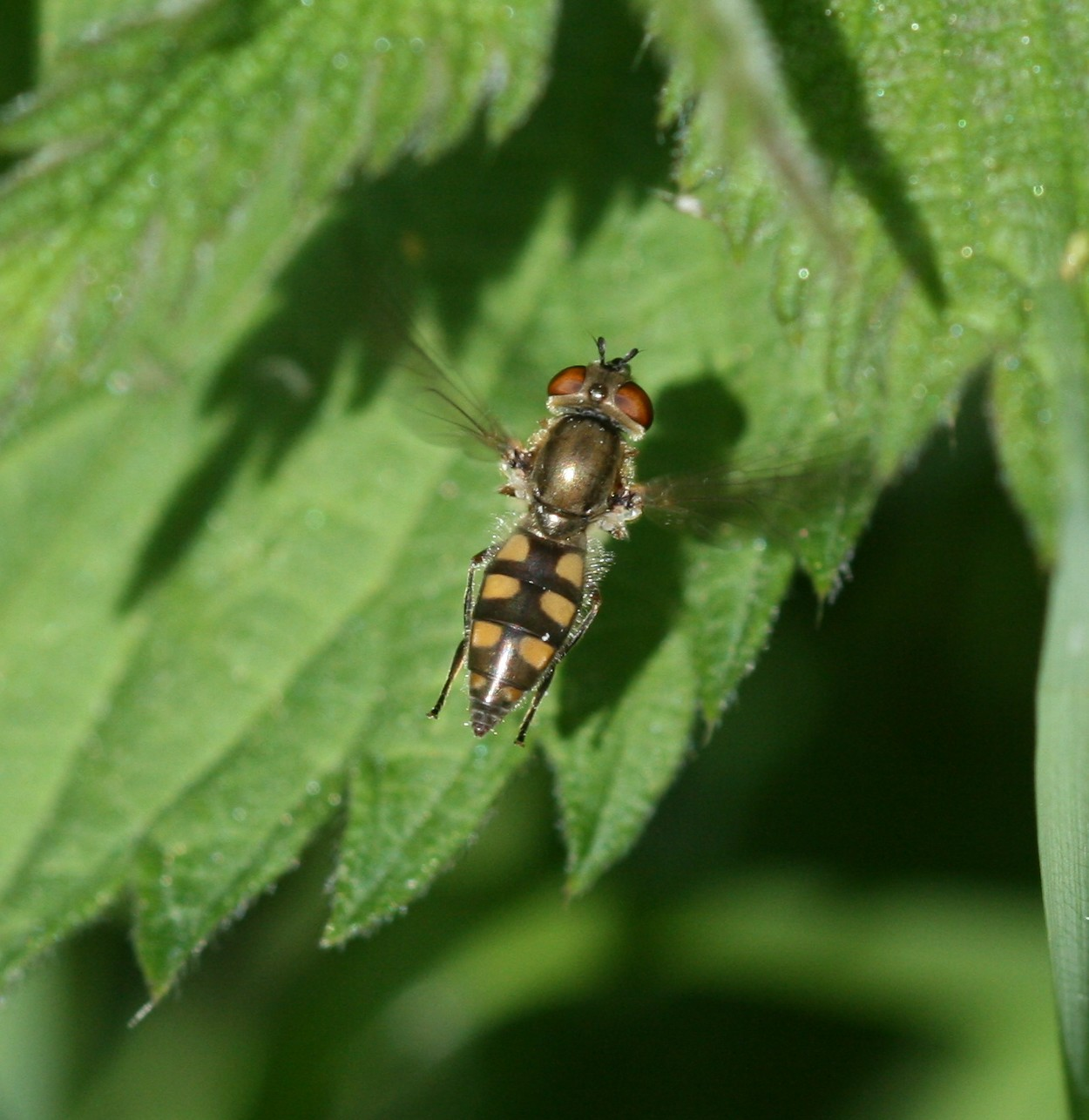
Platycheirus manicatus female

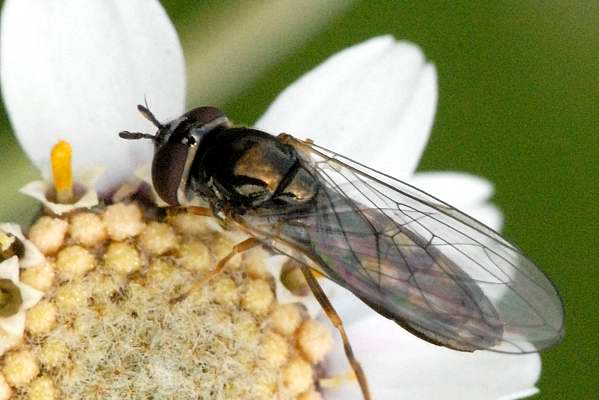
Platycheirus occultus female
