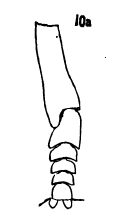
- Platychirus quadratus front tibia and tarsus

Scientific classification
- Kingdom: Animalia
- Phylum: Arthropoda
- Clade: Pancrustacea
- Class: Insecta
- Order: Diptera
- Family: Syrphidae
- Genus: Platycheirus
- Subgenus: Platycheirus
- Species: P. quadratus

Binomial name
- Platycheirus quadratus (Say, 1823)

Synonyms
- Scaeva quadrata Say, 1823; Syrphus fuscuanipennis Macquart, 1855

= Platycheirus quadratus =

Species of fly

Platycheirus quadratus is a species of syrphid fly in the family Syrphidae. </ref <ref name=Skevington2019> Skevington, Jeffrey H.; Locke, Michelle M.; Young, Andrew D.; Moran, Kevin; et al. (2019). Field Guide to the Flower Flies of Northeastern North America. Princeton Field Guides. Princeton University Press. ISBN 9780691189406.</ref>
