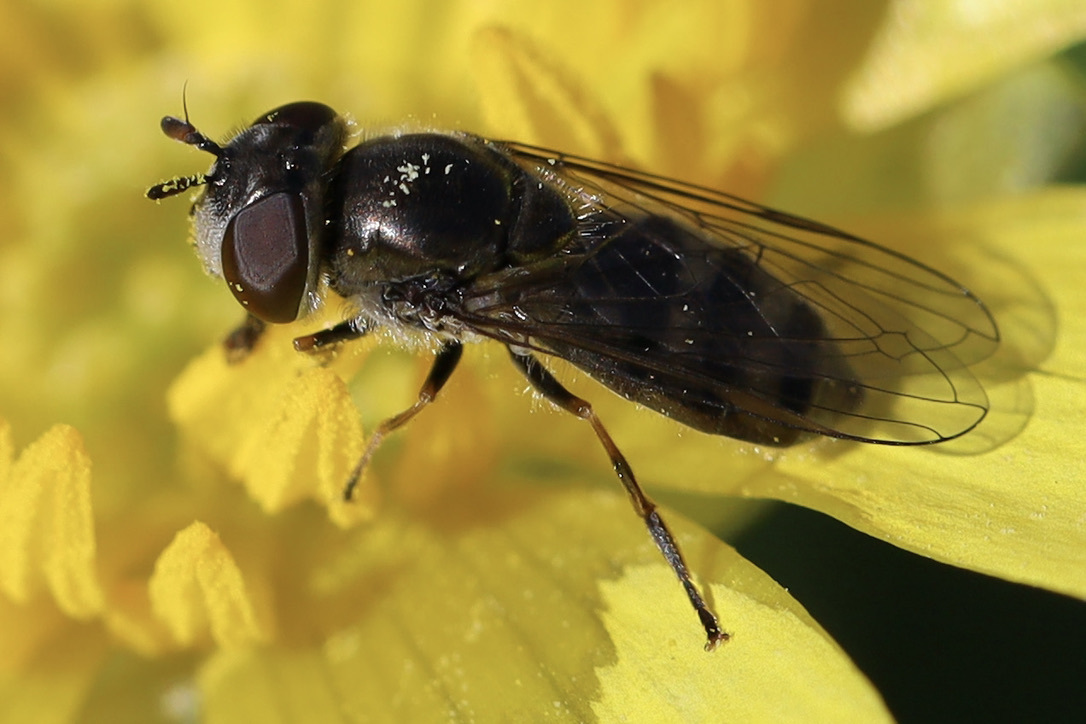

Scientific classification
- Kingdom: Animalia
- Phylum: Arthropoda
- Clade: Pancrustacea
- Class: Insecta
- Order: Diptera
- Family: Syrphidae
- Genus: Platycheirus
- Species: P. stegnus

Binomial name
- Platycheirus stegnus (Say, 1829)

Synonyms
- Melanostoma tigrina Osten Sacken, 1877; Syrphus stegna Say, 1829; Syrphus stegnus Say, 1829

= Platycheirus stegnus =

Species of fly

Platycheirus stegnus is a species of syrphid fly in the family Syrphidae.
