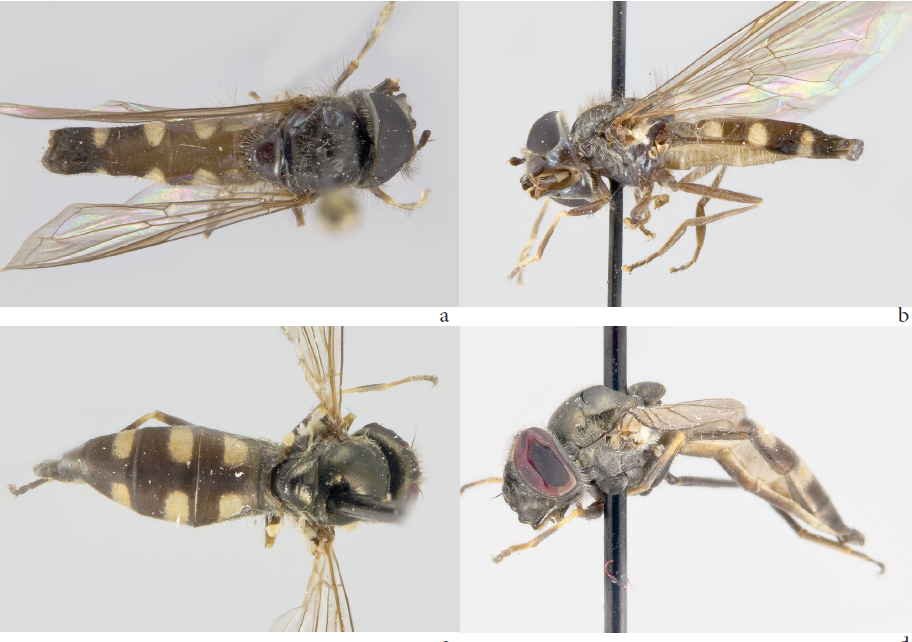
- Platycheirus flabella body male above female

Scientific classification
- Kingdom: Animalia
- Phylum: Arthropoda
- Clade: Pancrustacea
- Class: Insecta
- Order: Diptera
- Family: Syrphidae
- Genus: Platycheirus
- Species: P. flabella

Binomial name
- Platycheirus flabella Hull, 1944

= Platycheirus flabella =

Species of fly

Platycheirus flabella, the smallspot sedgesitter, is a rare species of fly in the family Syrphidae. Found from mountainous regions of Alaska, Yukon Territory, British Columbia, Idaho, Washington, Ontario and Quebec, and Maine. P.flabella is similar to Platycheirus discimanus and Platycheirus thylax

== Description of male ==
For terminology see Speight key to genera and glossary or Glossary of morphological terminology

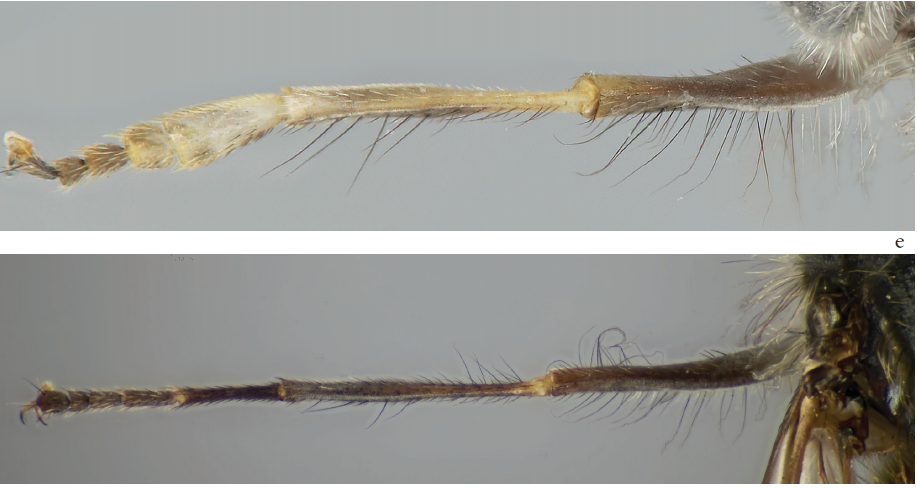
Platycheirus flabella male legs front over middle

Length
6.8–9.1 mm (0.27–0.36 in)
Head
The vertex and front are shining black, while the face is somewhat densely covered in grey pollen, featuring a shining black tubercle and gena. The oral margin protrudes forward to the level of the tubercle.
Thorax
The scutellum and pleura are also shining black, with the sides of the scutellum and most of the pleura thinly dusted with white pubescence. Additionally, the pile of the scutellum is very long and sparse.
Abdomen
Moderately shining black, faintly greenish, becoming brassy on the lateral margin. On either side, and in the middle of the second segment there are small, oval, yellowish-brown spots separated from the lateral margin. There are similar spots upon the third and fourth segment lying close to the base of the segment. The pile of the abdomen is yellowish along the sides, short, appressed and black in the middles of the segments.
Legs (see figures)
The first fore tarsomere broadens evenly from base to apex, measuring 1.5 to 2 times as long as it is broad. The second fore tarsomere is variable in shape, rectangular, and can be up to 1.5 times as wide as it is long, approximately one-quarter the length of the first tarsomere. The remaining fore tarsomeres are unmodified. The fore femur features a ventral row of 4-6 stiff black setae (thick hairs) on its basal half. Additionally, there is a row of weak black posterior setae on the basal third of the fore tibia, while the other two-thirds of the tibia have setae that are three times as long. The mid femur has a ventral row of 5-7 weak black or white setae on its basal half. On the basal third of the mid tibia, there is a posteroventral row of 5-6 weak black setae on the apical half, which are approximately three times as long as the tibial diameter.

General Anatomy click to enlarge

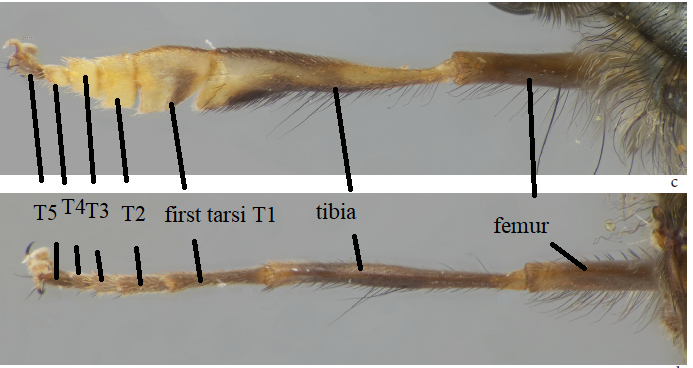
Legs

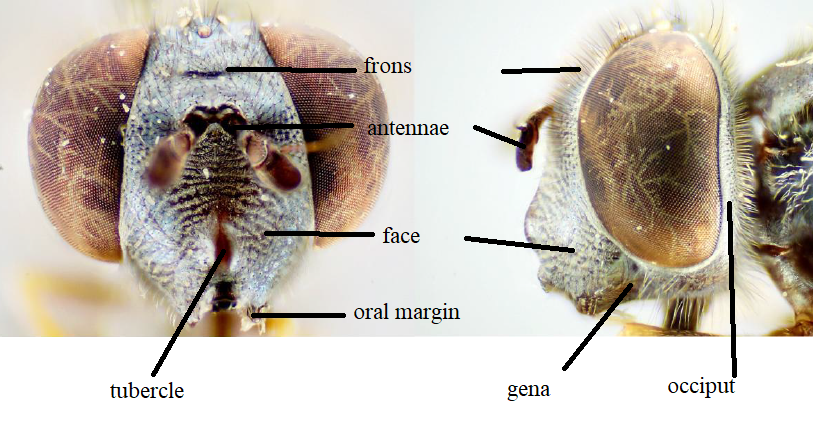
Head

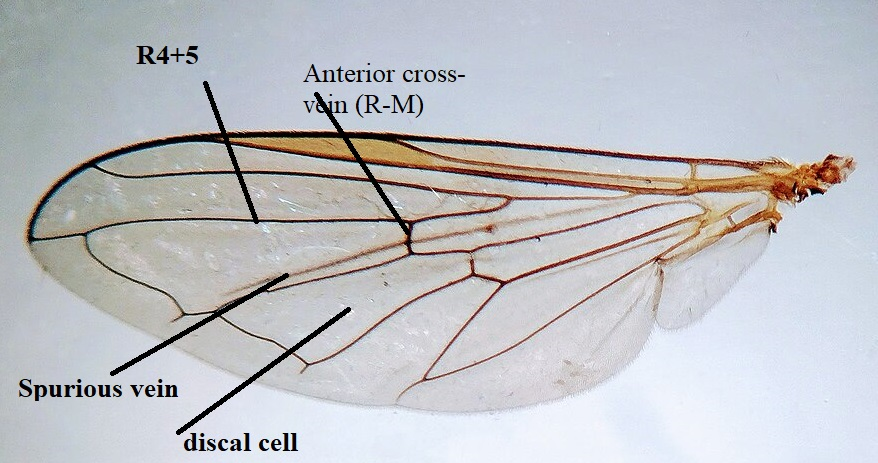
Wing

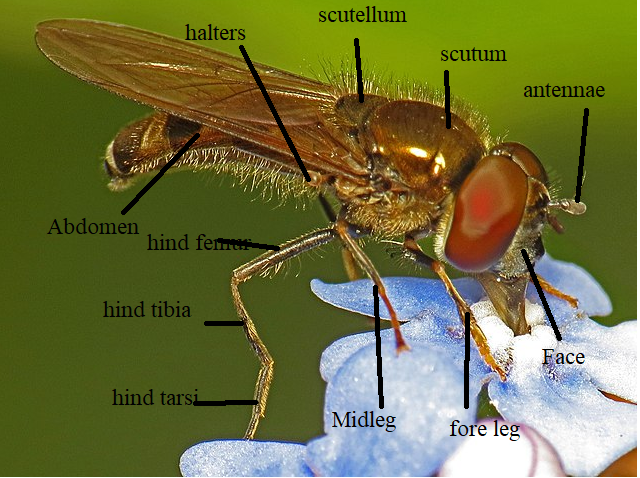
Bod
