= Platycheirus thylax =

Scientific classification
- Kingdom: Animalia
- Phylum: Arthropoda
- Clade: Pancrustacea
- Class: Insecta
- Order: Diptera
- Family: Syrphidae
- Genus: Platycheirus
- Subgenus: Platycheirus
- Species: P. thylax

Binomial name
- Platycheirus thylax Hull, 1944

Species of fly

Platycheirus thylax is a species of syrphid fly in the family Syrphidae.
