= List of hoverfly species of Great Britain =

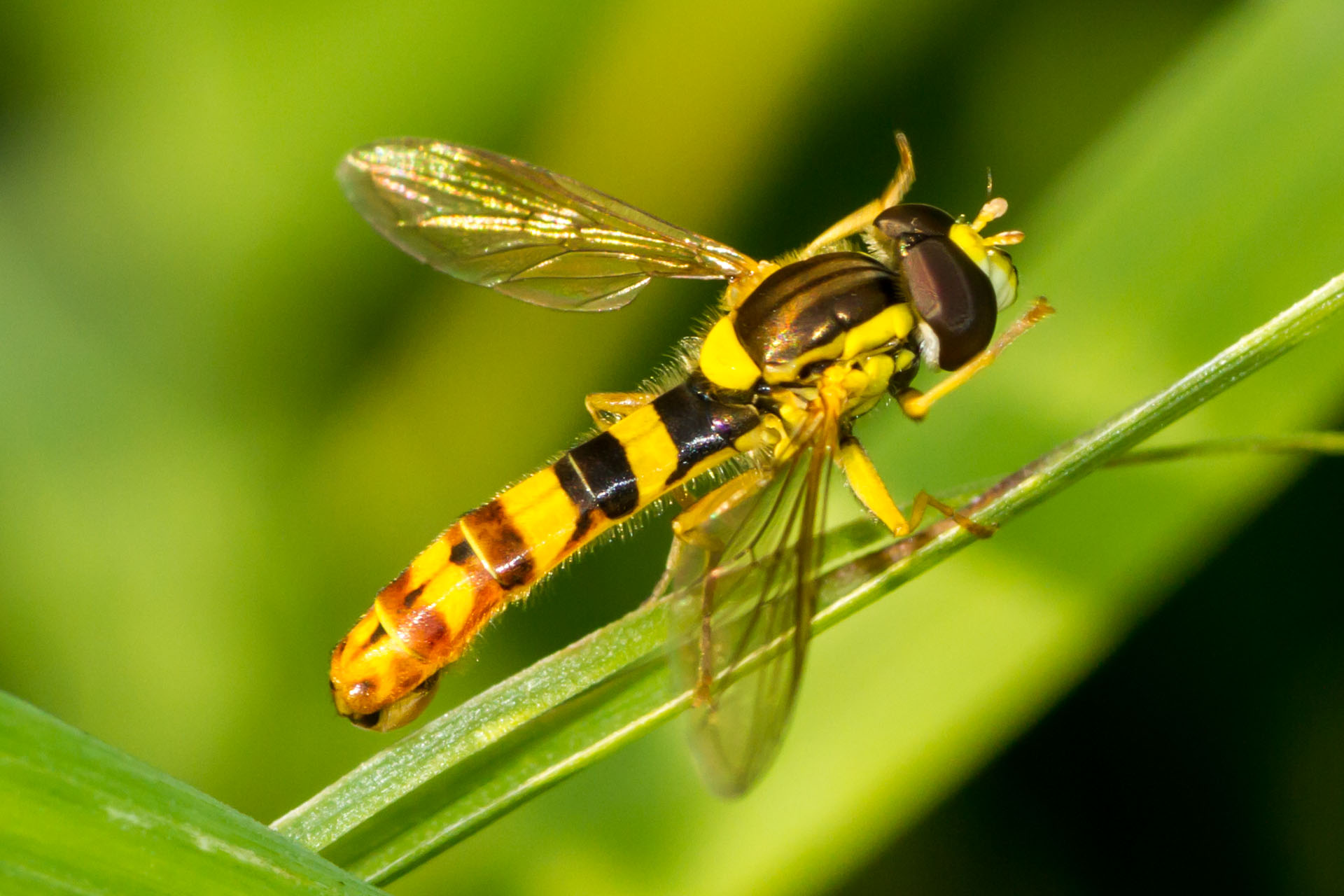
Male Sphaerophoria scripta hoverfly with thin abdomen

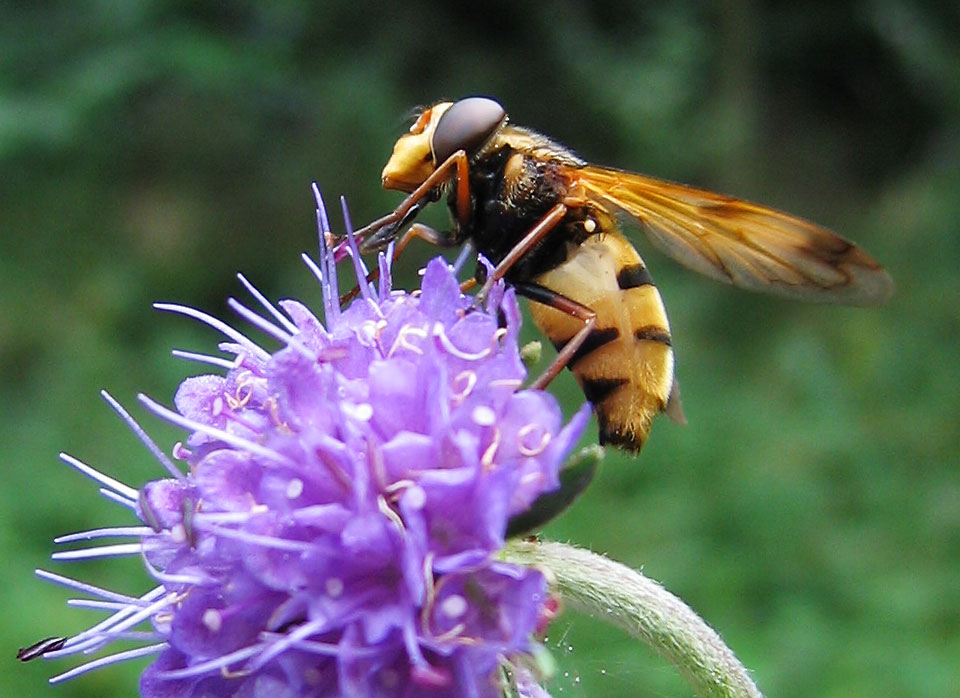
Volucella inanis is one of the larger species of hoverfly found in Britain.

The following is a list of hoverfly (Syrphidae) species recorded in Great Britain.

Alan Stubbs and Steven Falk, in their 1983 work British Hoverflies, divided the family into subfamilies and tribes. These subdivisions are now believed to be, to some extent, artificial groupings, not reflecting the evolutionary relationships within the family, so in need of revision. As no replacement system is yet in place, though, these groupings are retained in this list.

The six unnamed species listed in Stubbs and Falk (1983) are not included below.

== Subfamily Syrphinae ==
=== Tribe Bacchini (incorporating Melanostomatini) ===
Baccha
- Baccha elongata (syn. B. obscuripennis)
Melanostoma
- Melanostoma dubium
- Melanostoma mellinum
- Melanostoma scalare
Platycheirus
- Subgenus Pachysphyria
  - Platycheirus ambiguus
- Subgenus Platycheirus
  - Platycheirus albimanus
  - Platycheirus amplus
  - Platycheirus angustatus
  - Platycheirus aurolateralis
  - Platycheirus clypeatus
  - Platycheirus discimanus
  - Platycheirus europaeus
  - Platycheirus fulviventris
  - Platycheirus immarginatus
  - Platycheirus manicatus
  - Platycheirus melanopsis
  - Platycheirus nielseni
  - Platycheirus occultus
  - Platycheirus peltatus
  - Platycheirus perpallidus
  - Platycheirus podagratus
  - Platycheirus ramsaerensis
  - Platycheirus scambus
  - Platycheirus scutatus
  - Platycheirus splendidus
  - Platycheirus sticticus
  - Platycheirus tarsalis
- Subgenus Pyrophaena
  - Platycheirus granditarsus
  - Platycheirus rosarum
Xanthandrus
- Xanthandrus comtus

=== Tribe Paragini ===
Paragus
- Subgenus Pandasyopthalmus
  - Paragus constrictus
  - Paragus haemorrhous
  - Paragus tibialis
- Subgenus Paragus
  - Paragus albifrons

=== Tribe Syrphini (incorporating Chrysotoxini) ===
Chrysotoxum
- Chrysotoxum arcuatum
- Chrysotoxum bicinctum
- Chrysotoxum cautum
- Chrysotoxum elegans
- Chrysotoxum festivum
- Chrysotoxum octomaculatum
- Chrysotoxum vernale
- Chrysotoxum verralli
Dasysyrphus
- Dasysyrphus albostriatus
- Dasysyrphus friuliensis
- Dasysyrphus hilaris
- Dasysyrphus pauxillus
- Dasysyrphus pinastri (Note: listed as D. lunulatus by Stubbs & Falk (1983))
- Dasysyrphus tricinctus
- Dasysyrphus venustus
Didea
- Didea alneti
- Didea fasciata
- Didea intermedia
Doros
- Doros profuges (Note: listed as D. conopseus by Stubbs & Falk (1983))
Epistrophe
- Subgenus Epistrophe
  - Epistrophe diaphana
  - Epistrophe eligans
  - Epistrophe grossulariae
  - Epistrophe melanostoma
  - Epistrophe nitidicollis
  - Epistrophe ochrostoma
Epistrophella
- Epistrophella euchromus
Episyrphus
- Episyrphus balteatus
Eriozona
- Subgenus Eriozona
  - Eriozona syrphoides
Eupeodes (Note: Metasyrphus of Stubbs & Falk (1983))
- Subgenus Eupeodes
  - Eupeodes corollae
  - Eupeodes latifasciatus
  - Eupeodes latilunulatus (bucculatus)
  - Eupeodes lundbecki
  - Eupeodes luniger
  - Eupeodes nielseni
  - Eupeodes nitens
Fagisyrphus
- Fagisyrphus cinctus
Lapposyrphus
  - Lapposyrphus lapponicus
Leucozona
- Subgenus Ischyrosyrphus
  - Leucozona glaucia
  - Leucozona laternaria
- Subgenus Leucozona
  - Leucozona lucorum
Megasyrphus
- Megasyrphus erraticus (syn. Megasyrphus annulipes)
Melangyna
- Melangyna arctica
- Melangyna barbifrons
- Melangyna compositarum
- Melangyna ericarum
- Melangyna labiatarum
- Melangyna lasiophthalma
- Melangyna quadrimaculata
- Melangyna umbellatarum
Meligramma
- Meligramma guttatum
- Meligramma triangulifera
Meliscaeva
- Meliscaeva auricollis
- Meliscaeva cinctella
Parasyrphus
- Parasyrphus annulatus
- Parasyrphus lineolus
- Parasyrphus malinellus
- Parasyrphus nigritarsis
- Parasyrphus punctulatus
- Parasyrphus vittiger
Philhelius
- Philhelius citrofasciatus
- Philhelius pedissequus
- Philhelius stackelbergi
Scaeva
- Scaeva albomaculata
- Scaeva dignota
- Scaeva mecogramma
- Scaeva pyrastri
- Scaeva selenitica
Sphaerophoria
- Sphaerophoria bankowskae
- Sphaerophoria batava
- Sphaerophoria fatarum
- Sphaerophoria interrupta
- Sphaerophoria loewi
- Sphaerophoria philanthus
- Sphaerophoria potentillae
- Sphaerophoria rueppellii
- Sphaerophoria scripta
- Sphaerophoria taeniata
- Sphaerophoria virgata
Syrphus
- Syrphus ribesii
- Syrphus torvus
- Syrphus vitripennis

== Subfamily Milesiinae ==
=== Tribe Callicerini ===
Callicera
- Callicera aurata (Note: listed in Stubbs & Falk (1983) as C. aenea)
- Callicera rufa
- Callicera spinolae

=== Tribe Cheilosiini ===
Cheilosia
- Cheilosia ahenea
- Cheilosia albipila
- Cheilosia albitarsis
- Cheilosia antiqua
- Cheilosia barbata
- Cheilosia bergenstammi
- Cheilosia caerulescens
- Cheilosia carbonaria
- Cheilosia chrysocoma
- Cheilosia cynocephala
- Cheilosia fraterna
- Cheilosia griseiventris
- Cheilosia grossa
- Cheilosia illustrata
- Cheilosia impressa
- Cheilosia lasiopa (Note: listed as C. honesta by Stubbs & Falk (1983))
- Cheilosia latifrons (syn. C. intonsa)
- Cheilosia longula
- Cheilosia mutabilis
- Cheilosia nebulosa
- Cheilosia nigripes
- Cheilosia pagana
- Cheilosia praecox (syn. C. globulipes)
- Cheilosia proxima
- Cheilosia psilophthalma
- Cheilosia pubera
- Cheilosia sahlbergi
- Cheilosia scutellata
- Cheilosia semifasciata
- Cheilosia soror
- Cheilosia uviformis
- Cheilosia variabilis
- Cheilosia velutina
- Cheilosia vernalis
- Cheilosia vicina (syn. C. nasutula)
- Cheilosia vulpina
Ferdinandea
- Ferdinandea cuprea
- Ferdinandea ruficornis
Portevinia
- Portevinia maculata
Rhingia
- Rhingia campestris
- Rhingia rostrata

=== Tribe Chrysogastrini ===
Brachyopa
- Brachyopa bicolor
- Brachyopa insensilis
- Brachyopa pilosa
- Brachyopa scutellaris
Chrysogaster
- Chrysogaster cemiteriorum (syn. Ch. chalybeata)
- Chrysogaster solstitialis
- Chrysogaster virescens

Hammerschmidtia
- Hammerschmidtia ferruginea
Lejogaster
- Subgenus Liogaster
  - Lejogaster metallina
  - Lejogaster tarsata (syn. L. splendida)
Melanogaster (Note: included in Chrysogaster in Stubbs & Falk (1983))
- Melanogaster aerosa (Note: listed as Chrysogaster macquarti in Stubbs & Falk (1983))
- Melanogaster hirtella
Myolepta
- Myolepta dubia (Note: listed as M. luteola in Stubbs & Falk (1983))
- Myolepta potens
Neoascia
- Subgenus Neoascia
  - Neoascia podagrica
  - Neoascia tenur
- Subgenus Neoasciella
  - Neoascia geniculata
  - Neoascia interrupta
  - Neoascia meticulosa
  - Neoascia obliqua
Orthonevra
- Orthonevra brevicornis
- Orthonevra geniculata
- Orthonevra intermedia
- Orthonevra nobilis
Riponnensia
- Riponnensia splendens
Sphegina
- Subgenus Asiosphegina
  - Sphegina sibirica
- Subgenus Sphegina
  - Sphegina clunipes
  - Sphegina elegans (syn. Sphegina kimakowiczi)
  - Sphegina verecunda

=== Tribe Eristalini ===
Anasimyia
- Anasimyia contracta
- Anasimyia interpuncta
- Anasimyia lineata
- Anasimyia lunulata
- Anasimyia transfuga
Eristalinus
- Subgenus Eristalinus
  - Eristalinus sepulchralis
- Subgenus Lathyrophthalmus
  - Eristalinus aeneus
Eristalis
- Subgenus Eoseristalis
  - Eristalis abusiva
  - Eristalis arbustorum
  - Eristalis cryptarum
  - Eristalis horticola
  - Eristalis interruptus (Note: listed as E. nemorum by Stubbs & Falk (1983))
  - Eristalis intricarius
  - Eristalis pertinax
  - Eristalis rupium
  - Eristalis similis
- Subgenus Eristalis
  - Eristalis tenax
Helophilus
- Helophilus affinis
- Helophilus groenlandicus
- Helophilus hybridus
- Helophilus pendulus
- Helophilus trivittatus
Lejops
- Lejops vittatus
Mallota
- Mallota cimbiciformis
Myathropa
- Myathropa florea
Parhelophilus
- Parhelophilus consimilis
- Parhelophilus frutetorum
- Parhelophilus versicolor

=== Tribe Merodontini (incorporating Eumerini) ===
Eumerus
- Eumerus funeralis
- Eumerus ornatus
- Eumerus sabulonum
- Eumerus sogdianus
- Eumerus strigatus
Merodon
- Merodon equestris
Platynochaetus
- Platynochaetus setosus (accidental import on vegetables)
Psilota
- Psilota anthracina

=== Tribe Pelecocerini ===
Chamaesyrphus
- Chamaesyrphus caledonicus
- Chamaesyrphus scaevoides
Pelecocera
- Pelecocera tricincta

=== Tribe Pipizini ===
Heringia
- Subgenus Heringia
  - Heringia heringi
- Subgenus Neocnemodon
  - Heringia brevidens
  - Heringia latitarsis
  - Heringia pubescens
  - Heringia verrucula
  - Heringia vitripennis
Pipiza
- Pipiza austriaca
- Pipiza bimaculata
- Pipiza fenestrata
- Pipiza lugubris
- Pipiza luteitarsis
- Pipiza noctiluca
Pipizella
- Pipizella maculipennis
- Pipizella virens
Trichopsomyia
- Trichopsomyia flavitarsis
Triglyphus
- Triglyphus primus

=== Tribe Sericomyiini ===
Arctophila
- Arctophila superbiens (syn. A. fulva)
Sericomyia
- Sericomyia lappona
- Sericomyia silentis

=== Tribe Volucellini ===
Volucella
- Volucella bombylans
- Volucella inanis
- Volucella inflata
- Volucella pellucens
- Volucella zonaria

=== Tribe Xylotini ===
Blera
- Blera fallax
Brachypalpoides
- Brachypalpoides lentus (Note: listed in Stubbs & Falk (1983) as B. lenta)
Brachypalpus
- Brachypalpus laphriformis
Caliprobola
- Caliprobola speciosa
Chalcosyrphus
- Subgenus Xylotina
  - Chalcosyrphus nemorum
- Subgenus Xylotodes
  - Chalcosyrphus eunotus
- Subgenus Xylotomima
  - Chalcosyrphus piger
Criorhina
- Criorhina asilica
- Criorhina berberina
- Criorhina floccosa
- Criorhina ranunculi
Pocota
- Pocota personata
Syritta
- Syritta pipiens
Tropidia
- Tropidia scita
Xylota
- Xylota abiens
- Xylota coeruleiventris
- Xylota florum
- Xylota jakutorum
- Xylota segnis
- Xylota sylvarum
- Xylota tarda
- Xylota xanthocnema

== Subfamily Microdontinae ==
Microdon
- Microdon analis (syn. M. eggeri)
- Microdon devius
- Microdon mutabilis
- Microdon myrmicae
