= List of the Syrphidae of Ireland =

List of the Syrphidae of Ireland Part of List of Diptera of Ireland

- Anasimyia contracta Claussen & Torp, 1980
- Anasimyia lineata (Fabricius, 1787)
- Anasimyia lunulata (Meigen, 1822)
- Anasimyia transfuga (Linnaeus, 1758)
- Arctophila superbiens (Müller, 1776)
- Baccha elongata (Fabricius, 1775)
- Brachyopa insensilis Collin, 1939
- Brachyopa scutellaris Robineau-Desvoidy, 1843
- Brachypalpoides lentus (Meigen, 1822)
- Brachypalpus laphriformis (Fallén, 1816)
- Chalcosyrphus nemorum (Fabricius, 1805)
- Cheilosia ahenea (von Roser, 1840)
- Cheilosia albipila Meigen, 1838
- Cheilosia albitarsis (Meigen, 1822)
- Cheilosia antiqua (Meigen, 1822)
- Cheilosia bergenstammi (Becker, 1894)
- Cheilosia chrysocoma (Meigen, 1822)
- Cheilosia grossa (Fallén, 1817)
- Cheilosia illustrata (Harris, 1780)
- Cheilosia impressa Loew, 1840
- Cheilosia latifrons (Zetterstedt, 1843)
- Cheilosia longula (Zetterstedt, 1838)
- Cheilosia nebulosa (Verrall, 1871)
- Cheilosia pagana (Meigen, 1822)
- Cheilosia psilophthalma (Becker, 1894)
- Cheilosia pubera (Zetterstedt, 1838)
- Cheilosia scutellata (Fallén, 1817)
- Cheilosia semifasciata (Becker, 1894)
- Cheilosia uviformis (Becker, 1894)
- Cheilosia variabilis (Panzer, 1798)
- Cheilosia velutina Loew, 1840
- Cheilosia vernalis (Fallén, 1817)
- Cheilosia vicina (Zetterstedt, 1849)
- Chrysogaster cemiteriorum (Linnaeus, 1758)
- Chrysogaster solstitialis (Fallén, 1817)
- Chrysogaster virescens Loew, 1854
- Chrysotoxum bicinctum (Linnaeus, 1758)
- Chrysotoxum cautum (Harris, 1776)
- Chrysotoxum fasciatum (Müller, 1764)
- Chrysotoxum festivum (Linnaeus, 1758)
- Criorhina berberina (Fabricius, 1805)
- Criorhina floccosa (Meigen, 1822)
- Criorhina ranunculi (Panzer, 1804)
- Dasysyrphus albostriatus (Fallén, 1817)
- Dasysyrphus hilaris (Zetterstedt, 1843)
- Dasysyrphus pinastri (De Geer, 1776)
- Dasysyrphus tricinctus (Fallén, 1817)
- Dasysyrphus venustus (Meigen, 1822)
- Didea alneti (Fallén, 1817)
- Didea fasciata Macquart, 1834
- Doros profuges (Harris, 1780)
- Epistrophe eligans (Harris, 1780)
- Epistrophe grossulariae (Meigen, 1822)
- Epistrophe nitidicollis (Meigen, 1822)
- Episyrphus balteatus (De Geer, 1776)
- Eriozona syrphoides (Fallén, 1817)
- Eristalinus aeneus (Scopoli, 1763)
- Eristalinus sepulchralis (Linnaeus, 1758)
- Eristalis abusiva Collin, 1931
- Eristalis arbustorum (Linnaeus, 1758)
- Eristalis cryptarum (Fabricius, 1794)
- Eristalis interruptus (Poda, 1761)
- Eristalis intricarius (Linnaeus, 1758)
- Eristalis lineata (Harris, 1776)
- Eristalis pertinax (Scopoli, 1763)
- Eristalis tenax (Linnaeus, 1758)
- Eumerus funeralis Meigen, 1822
- Eumerus strigatus (Fallén, 1817)
- Eupeodes bucculatus (Rondani, 1857)
- Eupeodes corollae (Fabricius, 1794)
- Eupeodes latifasciatus (Macquart, 1829)
- Eupeodes luniger (Meigen, 1822)
- Fagisyrphus cinctus (Fallén, 1817)
- Ferdinandea cuprea (Scopoli, 1763)
- Helophilus hybridus Loew, 1846
- Helophilus pendulus (Linnaeus, 1758)
- Helophilus trivittatus (Fabricius, 1805)
- Heringia heringi (Zetterstedt, 1843)
- Heringia vitripennis (Meigen, 1822)
- Lapposyrphus lapponicus Zetterstedt, 1838
- Lejogaster metallina (Fabricius, 1781)
- Lejogaster tarsata (Meigen, 1822)
- Leucozona glaucia (Linnaeus, 1758)
- Leucozona laternaria (Müller, 1776)
- Leucozona lucorum (Linnaeus, 1758)
- Megasyrphus erraticus (Linnaeus, 1758)
- Melangyna arctica (Zetterstedt, 1838)
- Melangyna compositarum (Verrall, 1873)
- Melangyna lasiophthalma (Zetterstedt, 1843)
- Melangyna quadrimaculata Verrall, 1873
- Melangyna umbellatarum (Fabricius, 1794)
- Melanogaster aerosa (Loew, 1843)
- Melanogaster hirtella (Loew, 1843)
- Melanostoma mellinum (Linnaeus, 1758)
- Melanostoma scalare (Fabricius, 1794)
- Meligramma guttata (Fallén, 1817)
- Meliscaeva auricollis (Meigen, 1822)
- Meliscaeva cinctella (Zetterstedt, 1843)
- Merodon equestris (Fabricius, 1794)
- Microdon analis (Macquart, 1842)
- Microdon mutabilis (Linnaeus, 1758)
- Microdon myrmicae Schonrogge, Barr, Wardlaw, Napper, Gardner, Breen, Elmes & Thoma, 2002
- Myathropa florea (Linnaeus, 1758)
- Neoascia geniculata (Meigen, 1822)
- Neoascia meticulosa (Scopoli, 1763)
- Neoascia obliqua Coe, 1940
- Neoascia podagrica (Fabricius, 1775)
- Neoascia tenur (Harris, 1780)
- Orthonevra geniculata (Meigen, 1830)
- Orthonevra nobilis (Fallén, 1817)
- Paragus constrictus Simic, 1986
- Paragus haemorrhous Meigen, 1822
- Parasyrphus annulatus (Zetterstedt, 1838)
- Parasyrphus lineolus (Zetterstedt, 1843)
- Parasyrphus malinellus (Collin, 1952)
- Parasyrphus nigritarsis (Zetterstedt, 1843)
- Parasyrphus punctulatus (Verrall, 1873)
- Parasyrphus vittiger (Zetterstedt, 1843)
- Parhelophilus consimilis (Malm, 1863)
- Parhelophilus versicolor (Fabricius, 1794)
- Pipiza austriaca Meigen, 1822
- Pipiza bimaculata Meigen, 1822
- Pipiza luteitarsis Zetterstedt, 1843
- Pipiza noctiluca (Linnaeus, 1758)
- Pipizella viduata (Linnaeus, 1758)
- Platycheirus albimanus (Fabricius, 1781)
- Platycheirus ambiguus (Fallén, 1817)
- Platycheirus amplus Curran, 1927
- Platycheirus angustatus (Zetterstedt, 1843)
- Platycheirus clypeatus (Meigen, 1822)
- Platycheirus discimanus (Loew, 1871)
- Platycheirus fulviventris (Macquart, 1829)
- Platycheirus granditarsus (Forster, 1771)
- Platycheirus immarginatus (Zetterstedt, 1849)
- Platycheirus manicatus (Meigen, 1822)
- Platycheirus nielseni Vockeroth, 1990
- Platycheirus occultus Goeldlin, Maibach & Speight, 1990
- Platycheirus peltatus (Meigen, 1822)
- Platycheirus perpallidus (Verrall, 1901)
- Platycheirus podagratus (Zetterstedt, 1838)
- Platycheirus ramsarensis Goeldlin, Maibach & Speight, 1990
- Platycheirus rosarum (Fabricius, 1787)
- Platycheirus scambus (Stæger, 1843)
- Platycheirus scutatus (Meigen, 1822)
- Platycheirus sticticus (Meigen, 1822)
- Portevinia maculata (Fallén, 1817)
- Rhingia campestris Meigen, 1822
- Riponnensia splendens (Meigen, 1822)
- Scaeva pyrastri (Linnaeus, 1758)
- Scaeva selenitica (Meigen, 1822)
- Sericomyia lappona (Linnaeus, 1758)
- Sericomyia silentis (Harris, 1776)
- Sphaerophoria batava Goeldlin, 1974
- Sphaerophoria fatarum Goeldlin, 1989
- Sphaerophoria interrupta (Fabricius, 1805)
- Sphaerophoria loewi Zetterstedt, 1843
- Sphaerophoria philantha (Meigen, 1822)
- Sphaerophoria rueppellii (Wiedemann, 1830)
- Sphaerophoria scripta (Linnaeus, 1758)
- Sphegina clunipes (Fallén, 1816)
- Sphegina elegans Schummel, 1843
- Syritta pipiens (Linnaeus, 1758)
- Syrphus rectus Osten Sacken, 1877
- Syrphus ribesii (Linnaeus, 1758)
- Syrphus torvus Osten Sacken, 1875
- Syrphus vitripennis Meigen, 1822
- Trichopsomyia flavitarsis (Meigen, 1822)
- Tropidia scita (Harris, 1780)
- Volucella bombylans (Linnaeus, 1758)
- Volucella pellucens (Linnaeus, 1758)
- Xanthandrus comtus (Harris, 1780)
- Xanthogramma citrofasciatum (De Geer, 1776)
- Xylota abiens Meigen, 1822
- Xylota florum (Fabricius, 1805)
- Xylota jakutorum Bagatshanova, 1980
- Xylota segnis (Linnaeus, 1758)
- Xylota sylvarum (Linnaeus, 1758)
- Xylota tarda Meigen, 1822

== See also ==
List of hoverfly species of Great Britain
