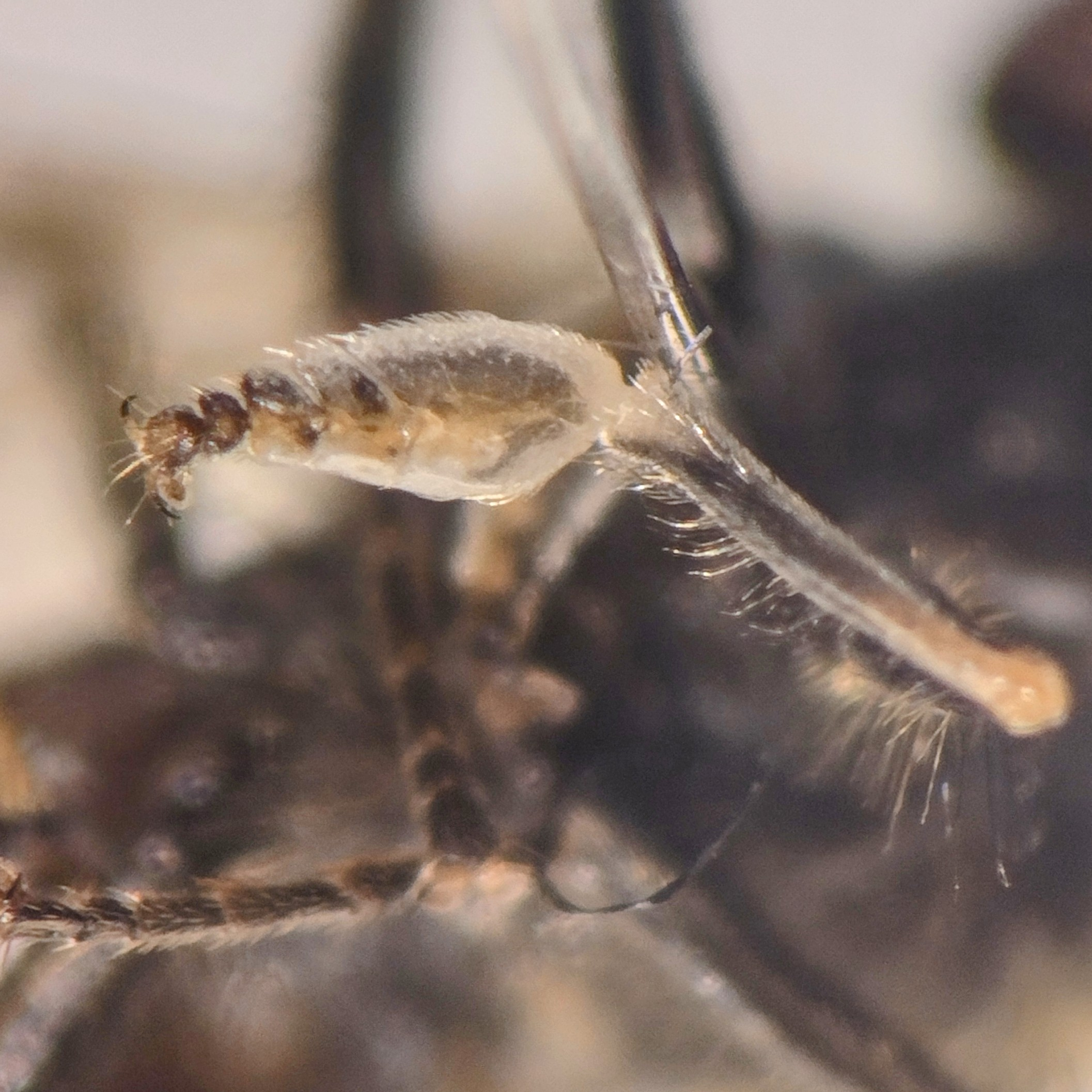
- Tarsus

Scientific classification
- Kingdom: Animalia
- Phylum: Arthropoda
- Clade: Pancrustacea
- Class: Insecta
- Order: Diptera
- Family: Syrphidae
- Genus: Platycheirus
- Subgenus: Platycheirus
- Species: P. melanopsis

Binomial name
- Platycheirus melanopsis Loew, 1856

= Platycheirus melanopsis =

Species of fly

Platycheirus melanopsis is a species of hoverfly. It is found from northern Europe across to eastern Siberia. The larva is described by Rotheray

== Description ==
A rather small and short Platycheirus with a protruding lower face related to Platycheirus manicatus and Platycheirus tarsalis. See references for determination.

== Distribution and biology ==
Palearctic Sweden, Finland and Scotland, northern England, the Alps and the Pyrenees; eastwards through North Europe and the Alps into European Russia and Siberia. The habitat is calcareous montane grassland with Picea, Betula, Juniperus, Pinus mugo and alpine grassland up to 2,700m.Flowers visited include Androsace, Calamintha, Cerastium, Cirsium, Convolvulus, Crepis, Gypsophila, Helianthemum, Hornungia, Pinguicula, Potentilla erecta, Ranunculus, Rhododendron ferrugineum. Flies June to August dependent on altitude. The larva feeds on aphids.
