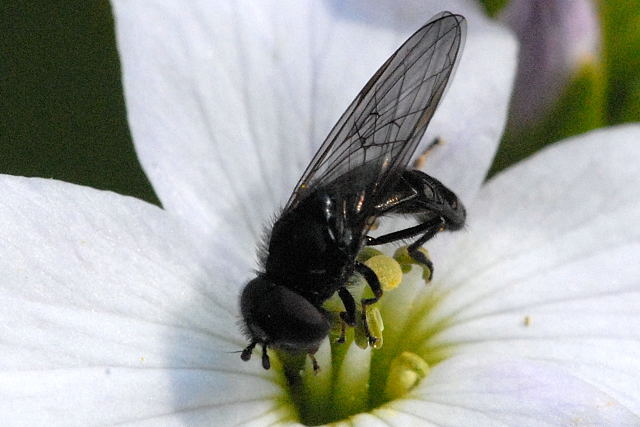

Scientific classification
- Kingdom: Animalia
- Phylum: Arthropoda
- Class: Insecta
- Order: Diptera
- Family: Syrphidae
- Genus: Triglyphus
- Species: T. primus

Binomial name
- Triglyphus primus Loew, 1840

= Triglyphus primus =

Species of fly

Triglyphus primus is a species of hoverfly, from the family Syrphidae, in the order Diptera. The larvae seem to be host-specific to an aphid species Cryptosiphum artemisiae which creates galls on Mugwort Artemisia vulgaris.
