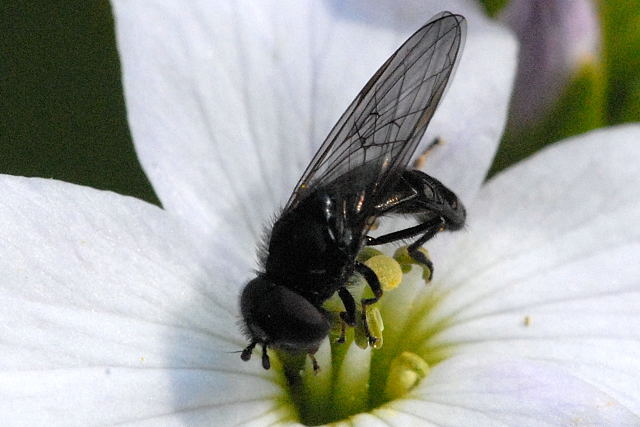
- Triglyphus primus

Scientific classification
- Kingdom: Animalia
- Phylum: Arthropoda
- Class: Insecta
- Order: Diptera
- Section: Aschiza
- Superfamily: Syrphoidea
- Family: Syrphidae
- Subfamily: Pipizinae
- Genus: Triglyphus; Loew

Type species
- Triglyphus primus Loew, 1840

= Triglyphus =

Genus of flies

Triglyphus is a genus of hoverflies from the family Syrphidae in the order Diptera.

== Species ==
Extant species:

- Triglyphus aureus Violovich, 1980
- Triglyphus escalerai Gil Collado, 1929
- Triglyphus formosanus Shiraki, 1930
- Triglyphus fulvicornis Bigot, 1884
- Triglyphus ikezakii Kuznetzov, 1990
- Triglyphus primus Loew, 1840
- Triglyphus sichuanicus Cheng, 1998
