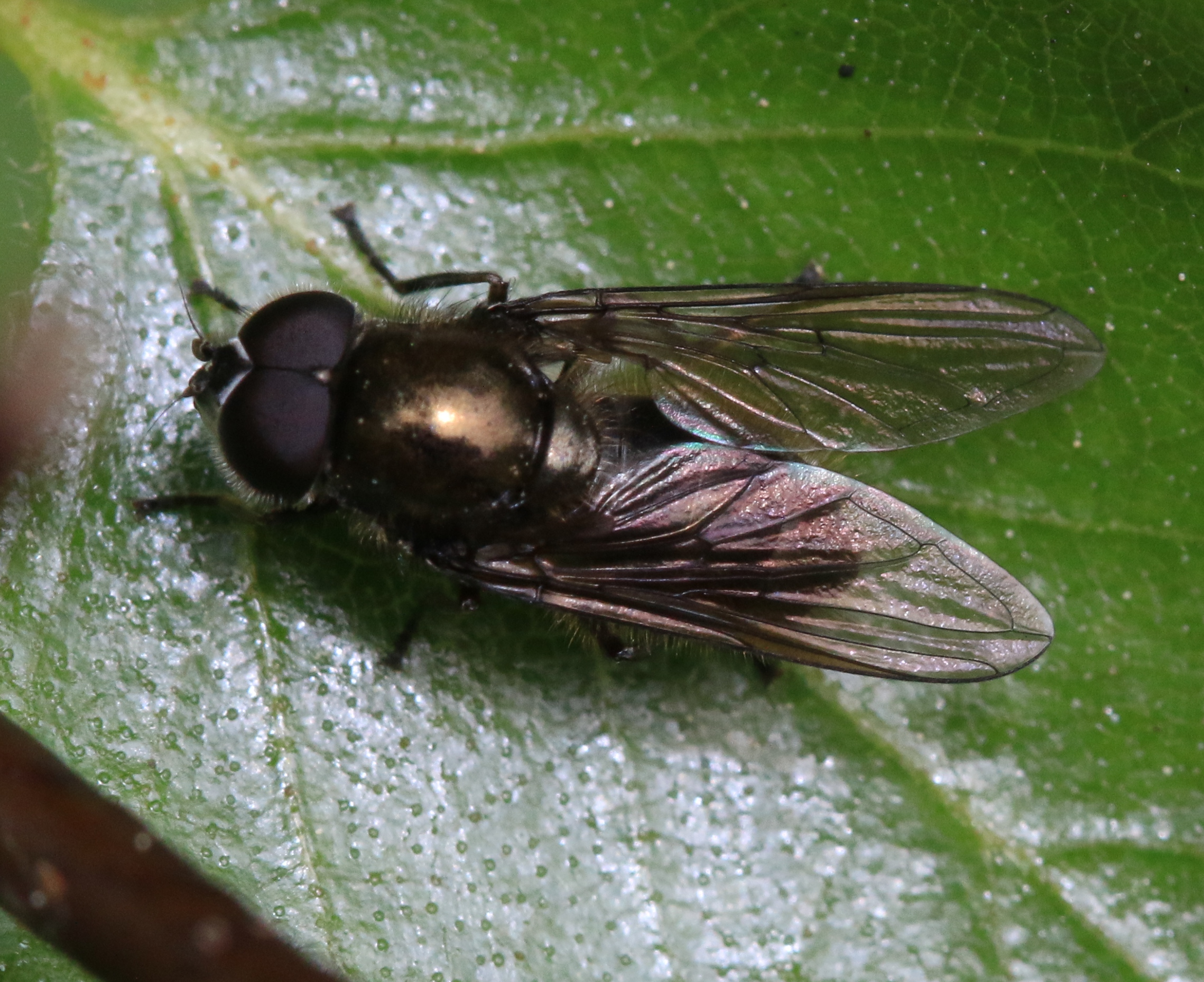
- Cheilosia urbana= praecox

Scientific classification
- Kingdom: Animalia
- Phylum: Arthropoda
- Clade: Pancrustacea
- Class: Insecta
- Order: Diptera
- Family: Syrphidae
- Genus: Cheilosia
- Species: C. praecox

Binomial name
- Cheilosia praecox (Zetterstedt, 1843)

= Cheilosia praecox =

Species of fly

Cheilosia praecox is a Palearctic hoverfly. Speight et al. (1998) indicate that the correct name for this species is C.urbana (Meigen).

== Description ==
It is similar to Cheilosia psilophthalma and related species.

== Distribution and biology ==
Its habitat extends from Fennoscandia south to the Iberian peninsula and the Mediterranean basin, from Britain eastwards through central and southern Europe to the Balkans and Turkey, and in North Africa. It prefers open places in coniferous and deciduous forest and scrub; grassland, including montane/subalpine grassland.

Flowers visited include white umbellifers, Acer pseudoplatanus, Anemone nemorosa, Buxus, Caltha, Euphorbia, Potentilla, Prunus spinosa, Salix, Taraxacum. It flies in April to June later at higher altitudes and more northerly latitudes. The larva feeds on Hieracium pilosella and Hieracium caespitosum.
