= Cheilosia longula =

Scientific classification
- Kingdom: Animalia
- Phylum: Arthropoda
- Clade: Pancrustacea
- Class: Insecta
- Order: Diptera
- Family: Syrphidae
- Genus: Cheilosia
- Species: C. longula

Binomial name
- Cheilosia longula (Zetterstedt, 1838)

Species of fly

Cheilosia longula is a Palearctic hoverfly.

== Description ==
External images For terms see Morphology of Diptera
Cheilosia longula shares bare eyes, partly pale legs, rather long wings and fused antennal pits with Cheolosia soror and Cheilosia scutellata but it is smaller (wing length 6-8·25 mm., body length 6.0 to 9.0 mm) and darker than these species. The central facial knob is confined to the middle of face (although the face is swollen to the eye-margins) and is not semicircular viewed from above as it is in C. scutellata. The front tarsi are brownish or blackish. The scutellar bristles are rather long, median pair at least as long as scutellum and the arista has rather short but obvious hairs . In the female the scutellum usually has a yellowish tip and the humeri are usually yellowish. The sternopleuron of females is usually yellow along the posterior margin. In females the frons has minute sparse punctation and is without a median groove. The larva is described and figured by Rotheray (1994). See references for determination.

== Distribution ==
Range: Fennoscandia south to the Pyrenees Italy and Yugoslavia.Ireland eastwards through USSR to eastern Siberia

== Habitat ==
The habitat is deciduous and coniferous forest and conifer plantations in glades, clearings, and by tracks and taiga

== Biology ==
Adults fly at heights up to 3m, often settling on low-growing vegetation in dappled sunlight. Flowers visited include species of Achillea, Calluna, Cirsium, Euphorbia, Galium and Potentilla erecta. Flies from the end of June to October, with a peak in September.The larva is an internal feeder on the tissues of various large, woodland basidiomycetes mainly Boletus, Leccinum and Suillus.
