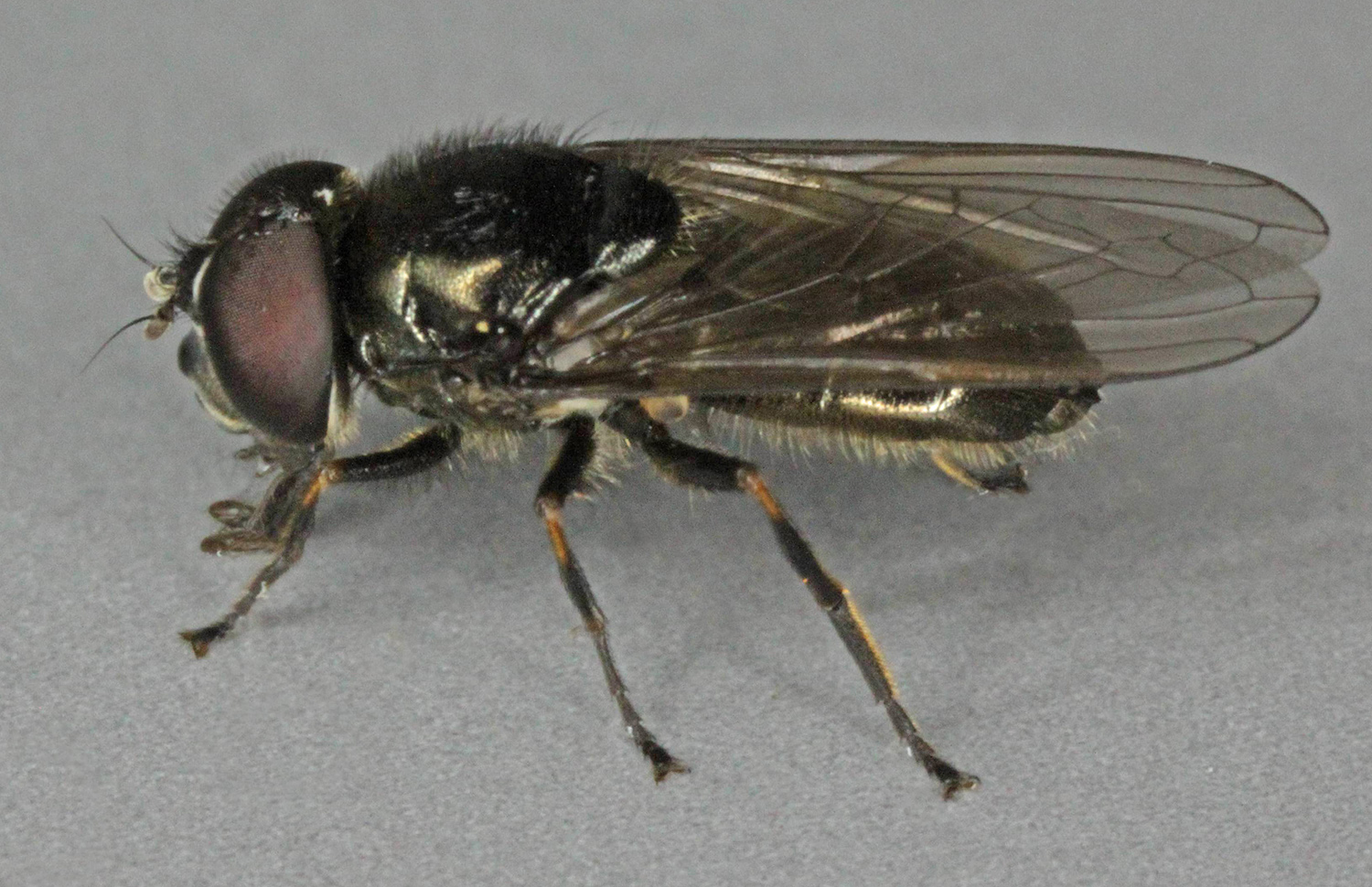
- Cheilosia vernalis North Wales

Scientific classification
- Kingdom: Animalia
- Phylum: Arthropoda
- Clade: Pancrustacea
- Class: Insecta
- Order: Diptera
- Family: Syrphidae
- Genus: Cheilosia
- Species: C. vernalis

Binomial name
- Cheilosia vernalis (Fallen, 1817).

= Cheilosia vernalis =

Species of fly

Cheilosia vernalis is a Palearctic hoverfly.

== Description ==
For terms see Morphology of Diptera
The upper margin of the facial tubercle is smooth. The eyes have short black hairs. The post-alar calli and the margin of the scutellum have only short bristles. The normal length wings are usually hyaline. The wing length is 4 ·5-6·75 mm., body length is 5.0 to 7.0mm.A very variable species. See references for determination.

== Distribution ==
Scandinavia south to the Iberian Peninsula and from Ireland eastwards through central and southern Europe to Turkey', European parts of Russia, Russian Far East and Siberia.

== Habitat ==
Very varied. Forest, pasture, montane grassland, alpine grassland, fen and dune systems.

== Biology ==
It is low-flying over ground vegetation; males hover at 1-3m in small clearings. Flowers visited include Caltha, Cirsium arvense, Leontodon, Leucanthemum, Menyanthes, Prunus spinosa, Ranunculus, Salix, Senecio, and Taraxacum. It flies from April to October. The larva feeds in the stems of Achillea, Matricaria and Sonchus oleraceus and in the involucre of Tragopogon.
