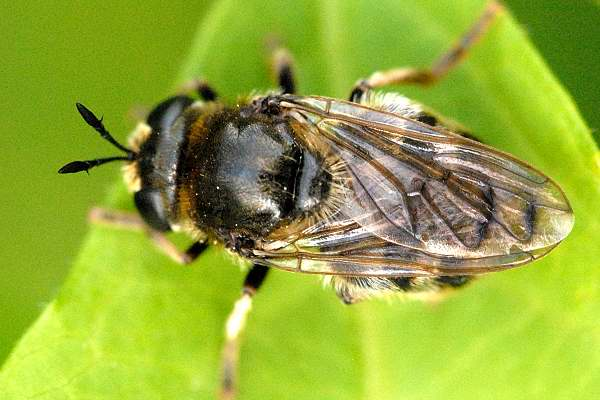

Scientific classification
- Kingdom: Animalia
- Phylum: Arthropoda
- Class: Insecta
- Order: Diptera
- Family: Syrphidae
- Genus: Microdon
- Species: M. analis

Binomial name
- Microdon analis (Macquart, 1842)

Synonyms
- Aphritis analis Macquart, 1842; Microdon eggeri Mik, 1897

= Microdon analis =

Species of fly

Microdon analis, is a species of hoverfly. It is found in the Palearctic. The distinctive almost slug-like larvae live in ants nests. The larvae are hemispherical in shape and heavily armoured. They are believed to prey on the eggs and larvae of a number of different ant species, notably Lasius niger and the Formica rufa group. These ants are usually found on heathland. However Schmid (2004) claims that Microdon analis and M. major which are cryptic species have been confused under the name analis. M.major is apparently associated with ants of the genus Formica, the other species, M.analis, with Lasius species.

== Description ==
For terms see Morphology of Diptera

Wing length 6·75-8·25 mm. 3rd antennomere about twice as long as 2nd. Tergite 3 without dusting. Tarsae 1 tarsomere 2 shorter than wide. Tibiae 2 with a narrow black ring. Ocellar triangle shiny. The male genitalia are figured by Doczkal & Schmid (1999). See references for determination

== Distribution ==
Palearctic Scandinavia South to the Mediterranean basin. Ireland East through Europe into Russia, the Russian Far East and Siberia and on to the Pacific coast. Mongolia.

== Biology ==
Habitat: Quercus, Pinus, Fagus, Picea, Betula forest with fallen trees. Adults are not known to visit flowers to feed but settle on foliage. The flight period is May to July.
