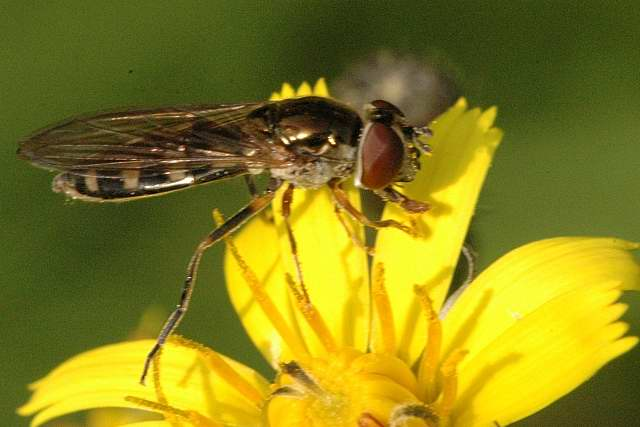
- Female

Scientific classification
- Kingdom: Animalia
- Phylum: Arthropoda
- Clade: Pancrustacea
- Class: Insecta
- Order: Diptera
- Family: Syrphidae
- Genus: Platycheirus
- Subgenus: Platycheirus
- Species: P. tarsalis

Binomial name
- Platycheirus tarsalis (Schummel, 1837)

Synonyms
- Syrphus tarsalis Schummel, 1837

= Platycheirus tarsalis =

Species of fly

Platycheirus tarsalis is a species of hoverfly. It is found in many parts of Britain and Europe.
