= Sphaerophoria batava =

Scientific classification
- Kingdom: Animalia
- Phylum: Arthropoda
- Class: Insecta
- Order: Diptera
- Family: Syrphidae
- Genus: Sphaerophoria
- Species: S. batava

Binomial name
- Sphaerophoria batava Goeldlin, 1974

Species of fly

Sphaerophoria batava is a Palearctic hoverfly. Identification is problematic and this species is little known.
