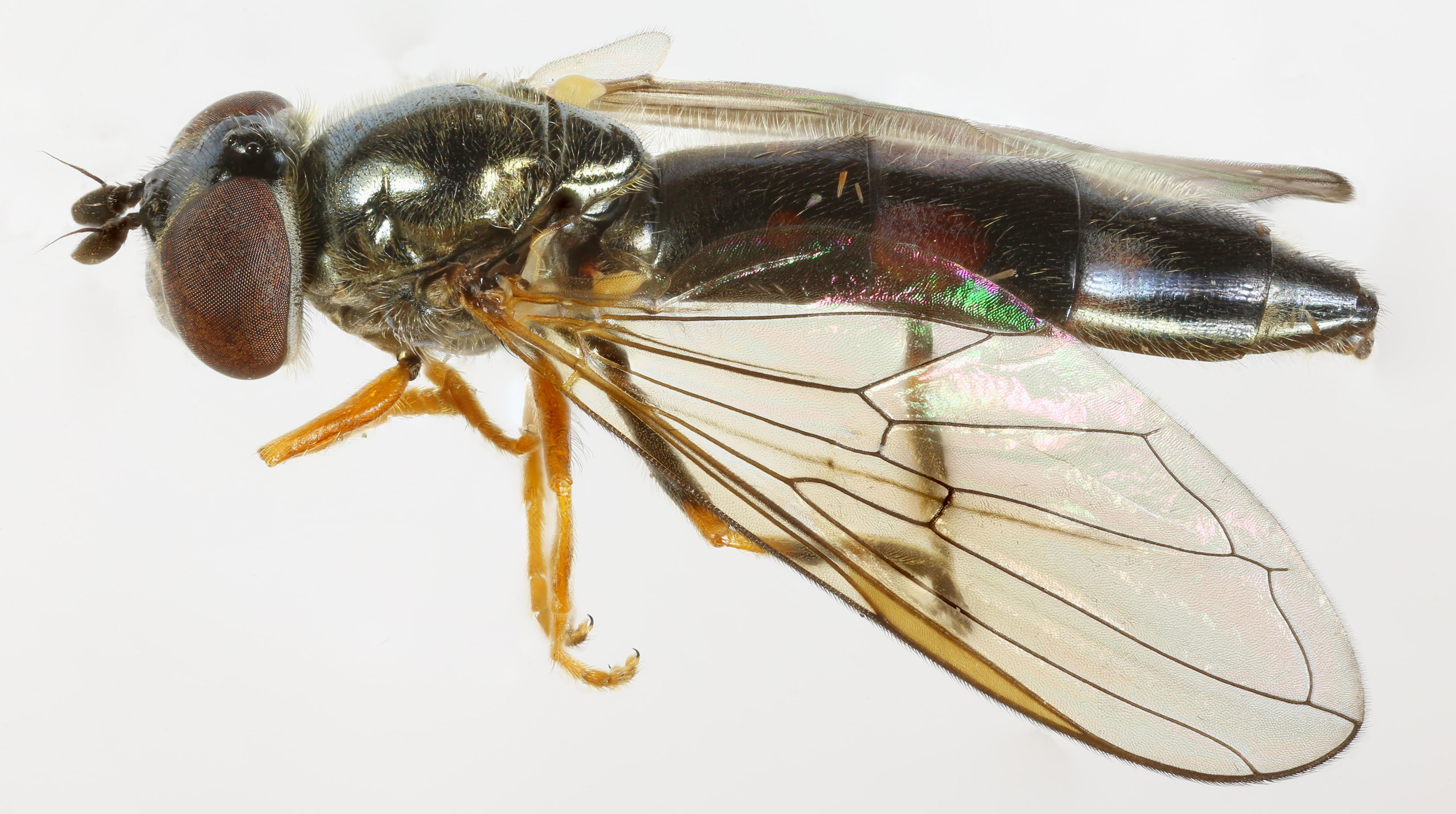
- Platycheirus angustatus female, Trawscoed, North Wales

Scientific classification
- Kingdom: Animalia
- Phylum: Arthropoda
- Clade: Pancrustacea
- Class: Insecta
- Order: Diptera
- Family: Syrphidae
- Genus: Platycheirus
- Subgenus: Platycheirus
- Species: P. angustatus

Binomial name
- Platycheirus angustatus (Zetterstedt, 1843)

Synonyms
- Scaeva angustatus Zetterstedt, 1843

= Platycheirus angustatus =

Species of fly

Platycheirus angustatus is a species of hoverfly. It is found in many parts of the Palearctic, and in the Nearctic.

== Description of male ==
For terminology see Speight key to genera and glossary or Glossary of morphological terminology

=== Length ===
5.7–7.9 mm (0.22–0.31 in)

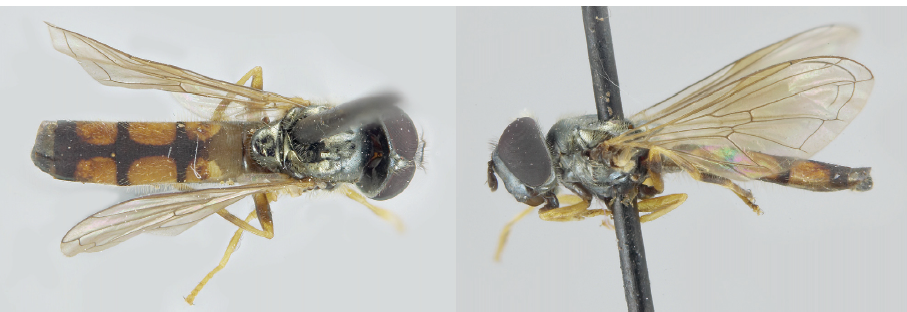
Platycheirus angustatus male

=== Head ===
The oral margin is rounded and not produced forward. The face is densely grey pollinose with a subshining tubercle.

=== Legs ===
The legs are mostly pale, usually featuring a posterior stripe on the fore and mid-femora, along with a broad ring on the hind femur and tibia. The hind tarsus is dark. The fore femur has a posterior subbasal tuft of 2-3 long, wavy, closely appressed white setae, while the remainder consists only of short, fine, white pile. The fore tibia is slightly broadened from base to apex, having the apical angle distinctly pointed. The first fore tarsomere is narrower than the end of the tibia and about 1.5 times longer than wide. The remaining fore tarsomeres are a little narrower than the first one. The mid femur usually has a cluster of up to 13 short, anteroventral, black setae on the basal half, which are sometimes less noticeable. The mid tibia is usually adorned with fine, ventral, wavy black or pale pile on the basal half, approximately twice as long as the width of the tibia. The first hind tarsomere is swollen, approximately three times as long as its greatest depth. The legs are otherwise unmodified.

=== Thorax ===
The scutum and scutellum are shining, with pollinosity present only laterally. The thoracic pile is white or pale yellow.

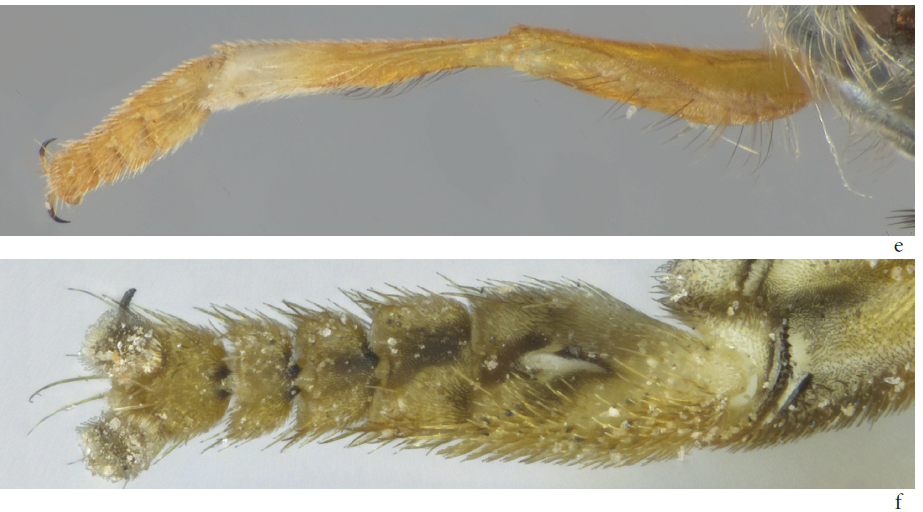
Platycheirus angustatus front leg male

=== Wing ===
The wings are usually brown-tinted, with small bare areas at the bases of cells c and bm, while cell bc is mostly bare. The halters are yellow.

=== Abdomen ===
The abdomen is narrow and parallel-sided, with tergites slightly longer than wide. The spots of tergites are yellow or orange, never pollinose, and at least slightly longer than wide. The spots of tergite 2 are well separated from the anterior margin, sometimes meeting the lateral margin. The spots of tergites 3 and 4 meet the anterior and lateral margins. Tergite 5 is entirely dark.. The larva is described and figured by Rotheray (1988) See references for determination.

== Distribution ==
Palearctic: Fennoscandia south to North Spain, Ireland east through North Europe and Central Europe, European Russia to Siberia and the Pacific coast (Sakhalin Is.) Nearctic: Alaska to Quebec and south to Washington.

== Biology ==
Habitat: wetland fen, marsh unimproved grassland subject to seasonal flooding. Flowers visited include Cyperaceae, Graminae, Aegopodium, Leontodon, Lycopus europaeus, Polygonum cuspidatum, Ranunculus, Rubus fruticosus. Flies May to September. The larva feeds on aphids.
