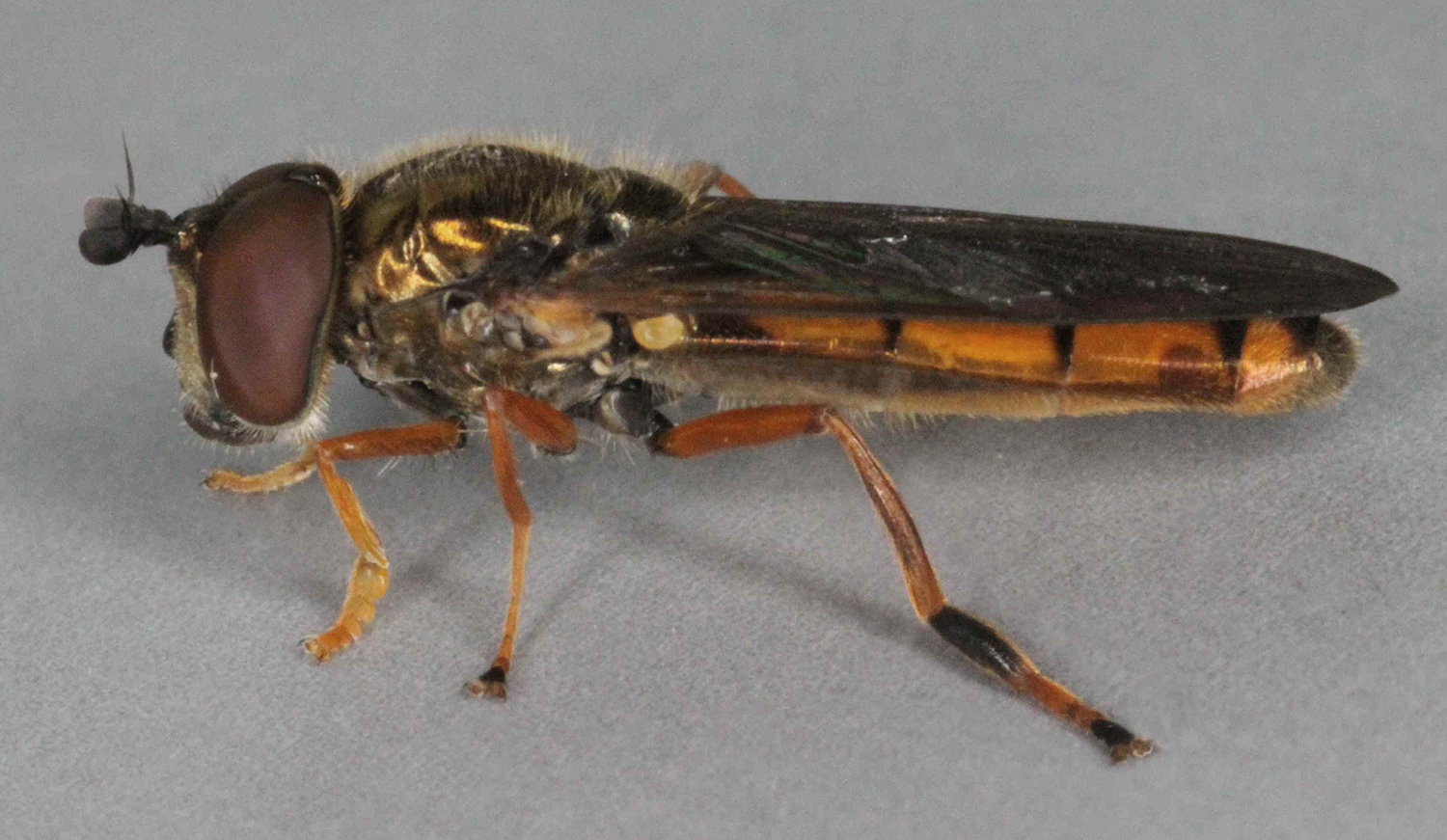
- Platycheirus fulviventris, Trawscoed, North Wales

Scientific classification
- Kingdom: Animalia
- Phylum: Arthropoda
- Clade: Pancrustacea
- Class: Insecta
- Order: Diptera
- Family: Syrphidae
- Genus: Platycheirus
- Subgenus: Platycheirus
- Species: P. fulviventris

Binomial name
- Platycheirus fulviventris (Macquart, 1829)

Synonyms
- Platycheirus ferrugineus (Macquart, 1829); Syrphus ferrugineus Macquart, 1829; Syrphus fulviventris Macquart, 1829; Syrphus winthemii Meigen, 1830

= Platycheirus fulviventris =

Species of fly

Platycheirus fulviventris is a Palearctic species of hoverfly. It is found in many parts of Britain and Europe.

== Description ==
External images For terms, see: Morphology of Diptera.
Femora 1 has dense black hairs along entire length. Tibia 1 is abruptly widened at mid-length, then parallel-sided to the tip. See references for determination.

== Distribution ==
Palearctic: Fennoscandia south to Iberia and the Mediterranean basin, Ireland east through Northern Europe, Central Europe and Southern Europe into Turkey and European Russia and on to Siberia and the Russian Far East to the Pacific coast.

== Biology ==
Habitat: marsh, fen, river margins of rivers and ditches in farmland. Flies May to August.
