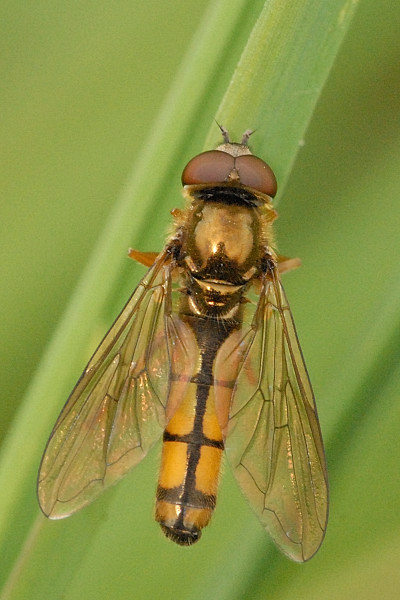
- Male
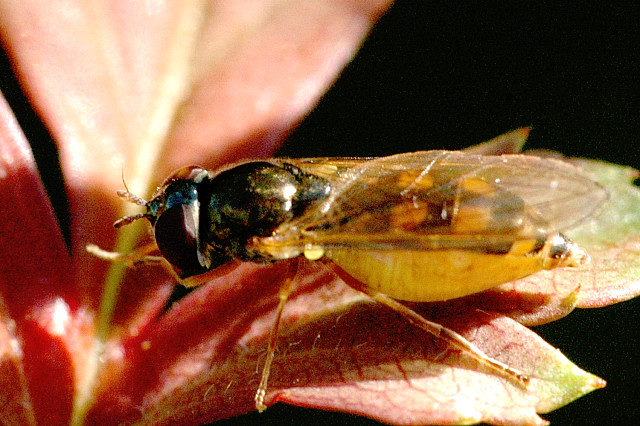
- Female

Scientific classification
- Kingdom: Animalia
- Phylum: Arthropoda
- Clade: Pancrustacea
- Class: Insecta
- Order: Diptera
- Family: Syrphidae
- Genus: Platycheirus
- Subgenus: Platycheirus
- Species: P. scambus

Binomial name
- Platycheirus scambus (Stæger, 1843)

Synonyms
- Syrphus scambus Stæger, 1843

= Platycheirus scambus =

Species of fly

Platycheirus scambus is a species of hoverfly. It is a Holarctic species.

== Description ==
External images For terms, see: Morphology of Diptera.
Femora 1 is without long white hairs at base and with 5 dorsal long black bristles. Tibia 1 is irregularly increasing in width, with a small incision at the outer margin. See references for determination.

== Distribution ==
Palearctic: Fennoscandia south to central France, Ireland eastward to Northern Europe and Central Europe to European Russia and through Siberia and the Russian Far East. Nearctic: from Alaska to Quebec and south to California.

== Biology ==
Habitat: fen, including coastal fen and river margins. Also lives in salt-marsh. It flies May to September.
