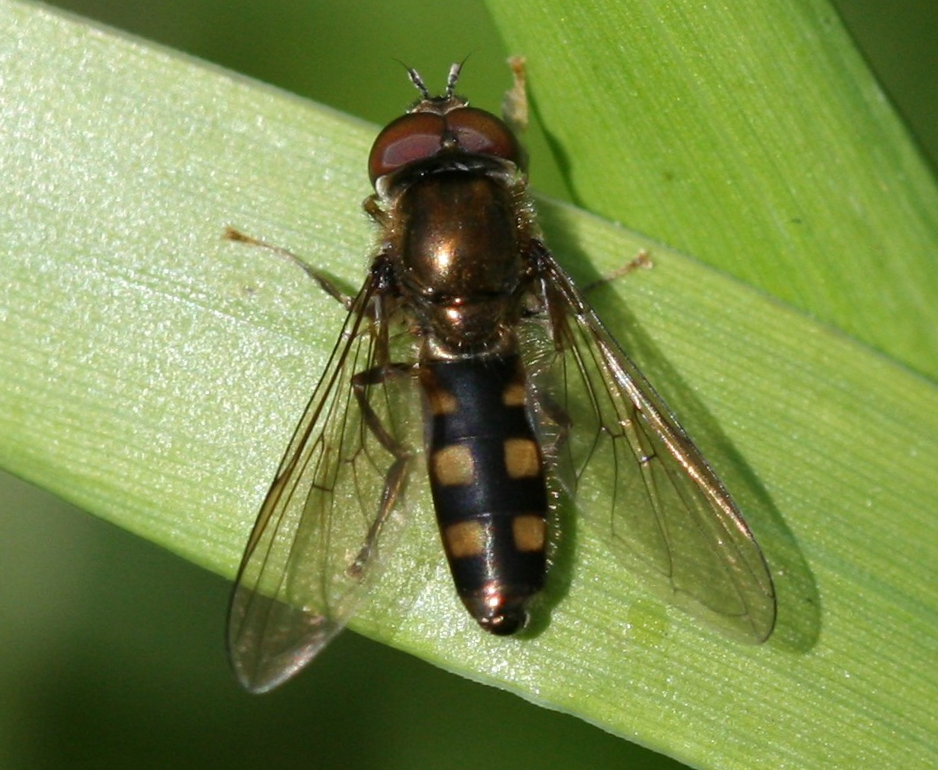
- Male
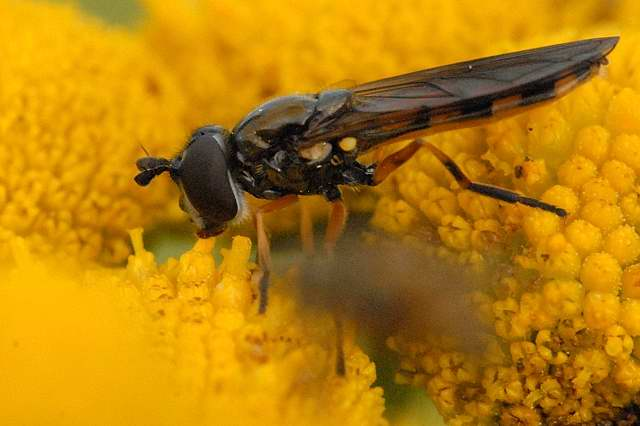
- Female

Scientific classification
- Kingdom: Animalia
- Phylum: Arthropoda
- Clade: Pancrustacea
- Class: Insecta
- Order: Diptera
- Family: Syrphidae
- Genus: Platycheirus
- Subgenus: Platycheirus
- Species: P. peltatus

Binomial name
- Platycheirus peltatus (Meigen, 1822)

Synonyms
- Musca timeo Harris, 1780; Platycheirus timeo (Harris, 80); Syrphus peltatus Meigen, 1822; Platychirus islandicus Fristrup, 1943; Syrphus cristatus Schummel, 1836

= Platycheirus peltatus =

Species of fly

Platycheirus peltatus is a Palearctic species of hoverfly.

== Description ==
External images For terms, see: Morphology of Diptera.
Tibiae 2 is uniformly broadened from base to apex, sometimes with a further swelling on apical 1/5. Metatarsae 1 is greatly enlarged. Dusting on frons is not well-defined. Short and broad tergites 6 and 7 and relatively broad posterior margin of tergite give the abdomen a blunt ended form.

See references for determination.

== Distribution ==
Palearctic: Norway, Sweden, Finland, Denmark, Ireland, Britain, Germany, the Netherlands, the Ardennes and Vosges mountains, the Loire floodplain, the Rhine valley, the Pyrenees and the Alps, the former Yugoslavia; Altai mountains (Siberia), and Japan.

== Biology ==
Habitat: fen and humid grassland and in association with tall herb vegetation of flushes in grassland; in open areas in humid Fagus, Abies forest. It flies May to August.
