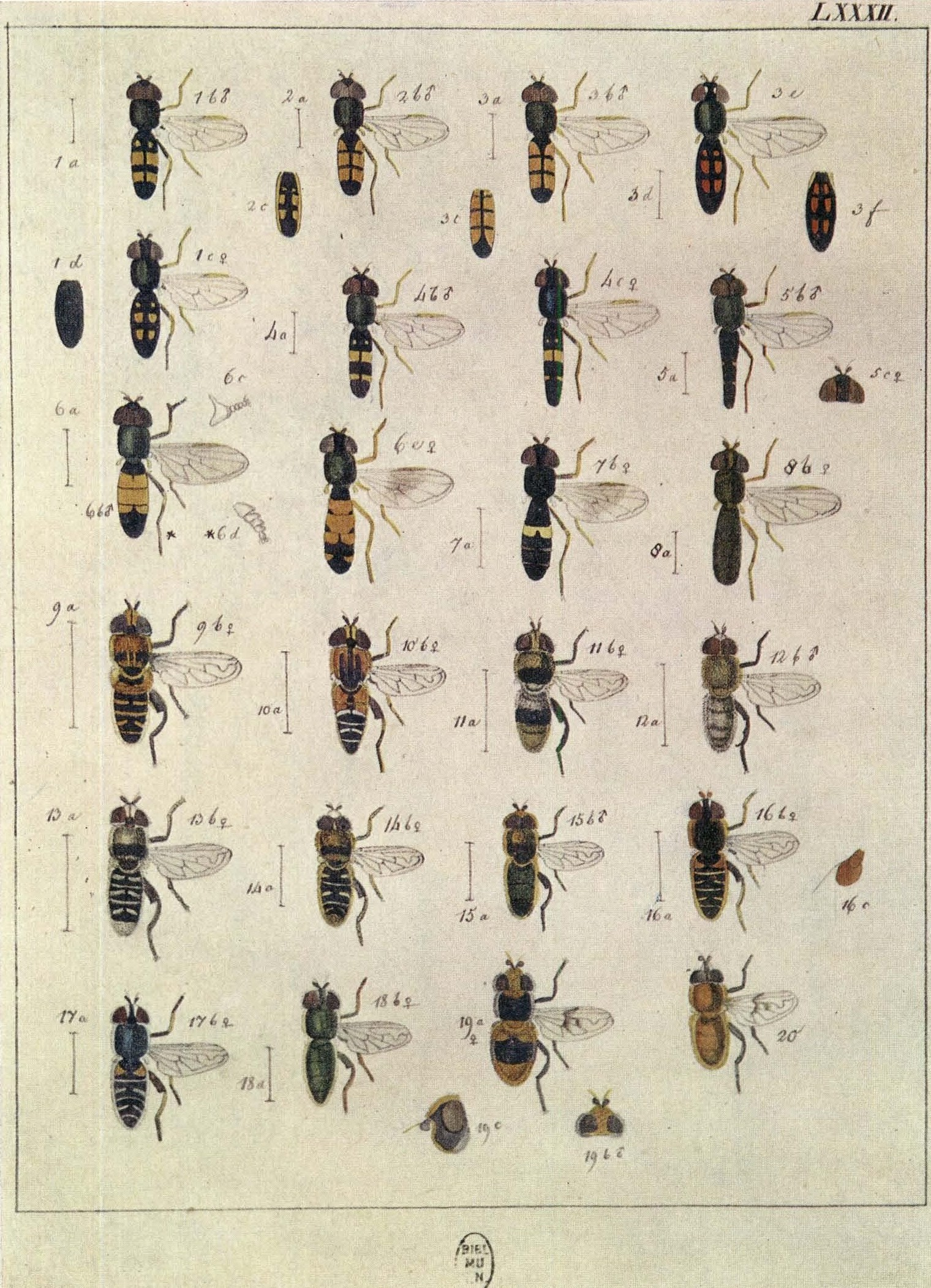
- Platycheirus sticticus in Meigen Europäischen Zweiflügeligen (figure 5)

Scientific classification
- Kingdom: Animalia
- Phylum: Arthropoda
- Clade: Pancrustacea
- Class: Insecta
- Order: Diptera
- Family: Syrphidae
- Genus: Platycheirus
- Subgenus: Platycheirus
- Species: P. sticticus

Binomial name
- Platycheirus sticticus (Meigen, 1822)

= Platycheirus sticticus =

Species of fly

Platycheirus sticticus is a species of hoverfly. It is found in many parts of Europe across to Siberia.

== Description ==
External images For terms see Morphology of Diptera
Tibiae 1 only slightly dilated at apex and with only scattered short, hair-like lateral bristles, yellow with a dark lateral marking at midlength.

See references for determination

== Distribution ==
Palearctic Southern Sweden and Denmark South to the Pyrenees and North Spain. Ireland East through Central Europe into Russia and on to eastern Siberia.

== Biology ==
Habitat Picea, Pinus plantation and Quercus woodland. Flies May to August.
