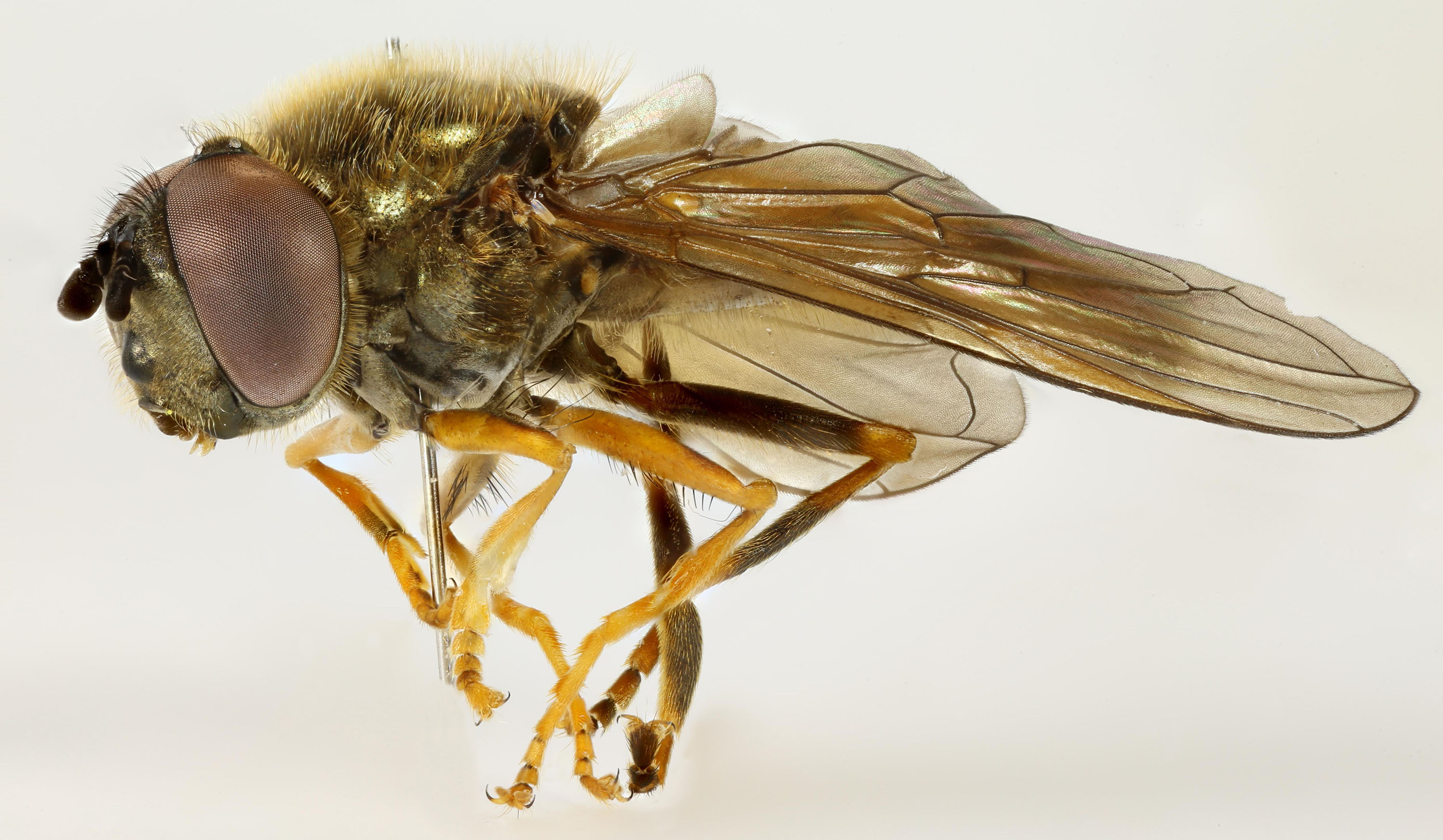
- Platycheirus immarginatus, Bagillt, North Wales

Scientific classification
- Kingdom: Animalia
- Phylum: Arthropoda
- Clade: Pancrustacea
- Class: Insecta
- Order: Diptera
- Family: Syrphidae
- Genus: Platycheirus
- Subgenus: Platycheirus
- Species: P. immarginatus

Binomial name
- Platycheirus immarginatus (Zetterstedt, 1849)

Synonyms
- Platycheirus felix Curran, 1931; Platycheirus palmulosus Snow, 1895; Scaeva immarginatus Zetterstedt, 1849

= Platycheirus immarginatus =

Species of fly

Platycheirus immarginatus, the comb-legged sedgesitter, is a common species of hoverfly. It is found in parts of northern Europe and northern North America.

== Description ==
For terminology Speight key to genera and glossary

Size

6.5–9.6 mm (0.26–0.38 in)

Head

The face is flat and the bottom of the oral margin is rounded, not extending forward. It is densely gray pollinose, with a bare shining tubercle. The antenna is entirely dark. The vertex is approximately twice the width of the ocellar triangle. There is pollinosity on the frons above the antennal insertions, forming two lateral triangles.

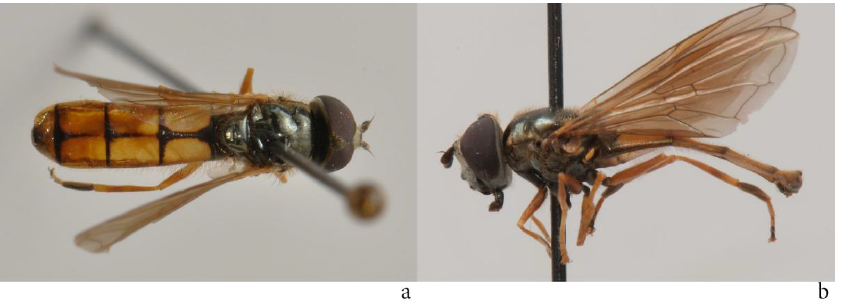
Platycheirus immarginatus male body from Andrew Young

Thorax

The scutum and scutellum are shining and have yellow pollinosity only on the lateral sides. The pleura is yellow pollinose above and white pollinose below The scutellar pile is about two-thirds as long as the arista, and the other thoracic pile is about half that long. Most pile is white or pale yellow, with a few spots of black pile on the scutum, the posterior margin of the posterior anepisternum, and the lower half of the katepisternum.

Abdomen

The abdomen is parallel-sided. Segment 2 has large, well-defined yellow spots that are at least three-quarters as long as the segment. Segments 3 and 4 are almost entirely yellow, with only a thin median black stripe and narrow posterior black margin present, and the median black stripe is sometimes faded to a dull brown on the apical half of the segment and extremely narrow. Segment 5 is nearly entirely yellow with a small posteromedian black triangle, sometimes reaching the anterior edge of the segment. In some specimens from the north may, rarely, have the large yellow areas reduced to smaller yellow spots. Spots of segment 2 may be circular and situated towards the center of the segment, and spots of segments 3 and 4 are separate from the anterior and lateral margins of the segments. Segment 5 is sometimes entirely black.

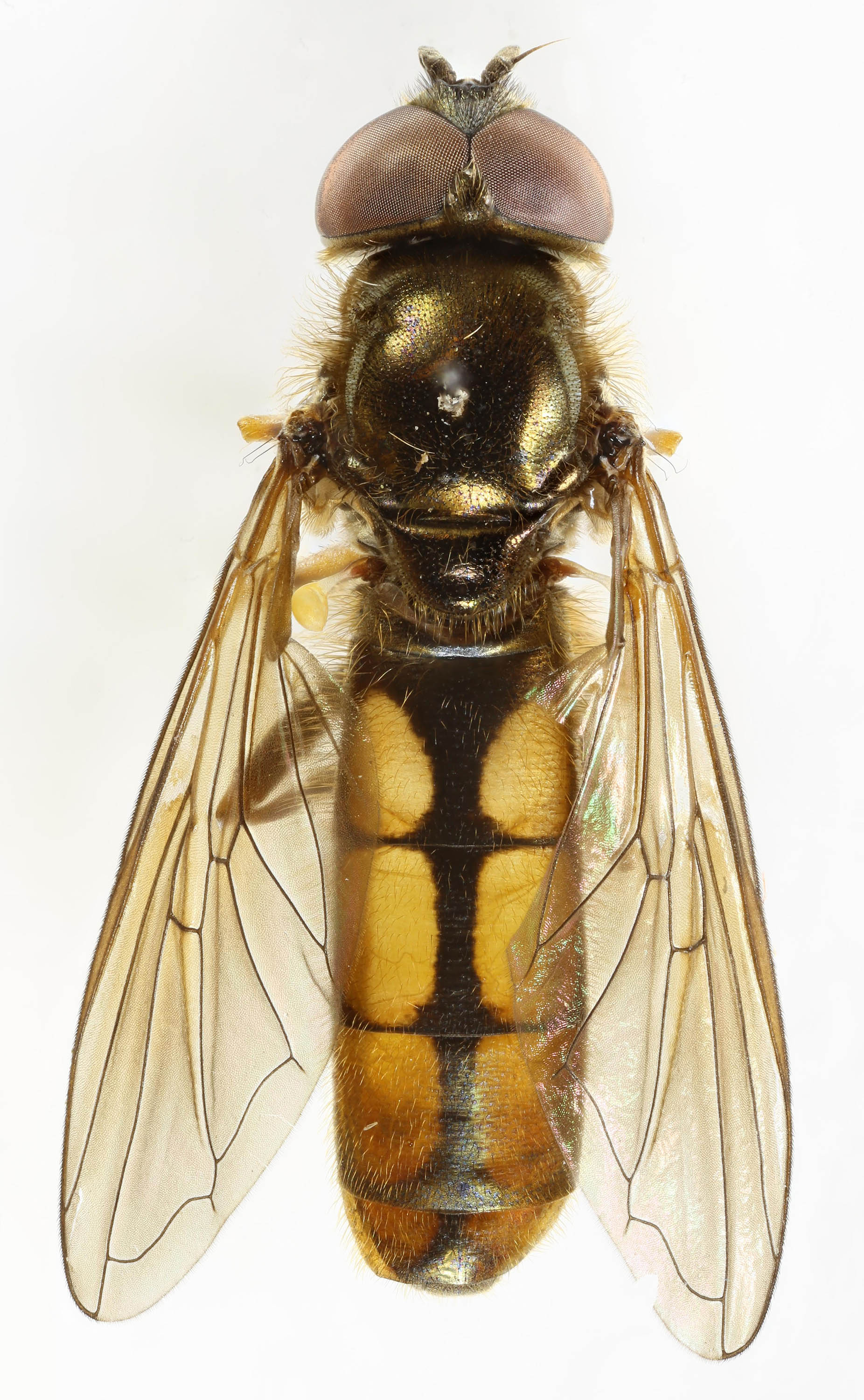
mostly yellow abdomen from Janet Graham

Wings

The wings are brown-tinted and entirely microtrichose. The halters are yellow.

Legs

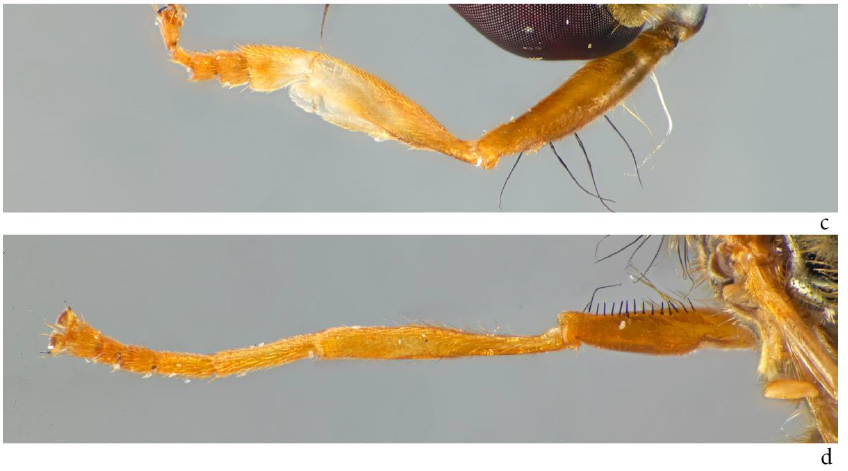
Platycheirus immarginatus male front and mid legs from Andrew Young

The legs are mostly pale. The coxae, trochanters, and hind tarsomeres 1, 4, and 5 being dark. The front femur has a posterior subbasal tuft of 2-3 long, thin, wavy, closely appressed white setae, followed by a regularly spaced row of 4-5 posterior, long, black setae with wavy tips. The longest black seta is approximately twice as long as the femoral diameter. The front tibia is somewhat strongly broadened from base to apex, with a posteroapical angle that is produced and bluntly rounded. The first front tarsomere is widened posteriorly, slightly narrower than the apex of the tibia, and about twice as long as it is wide. The remaining front tarsomeres are slightly narrower than the first and unmodified. The middle femur has an anteroventral row of 10-22 short, stiff, black setulae on the apical two-thirds, which usually ends in 1 or 2 longer setae that are strongly curved towards the base of the femur. The setulae of this row are no more than half the diameter of the femur, and the curved setae are approximately equal in length to the diameter of the femur. The middle femur also has 3-6 ventral, black or yellow setae on the basal half, which are approximately twice as long as the femoral diameter. The first hind tarsomere is swollen and approximately three times as long as its greatest depth. The legs are otherwise unmodified.

See references for determination.

General Anatomy click to enlarge

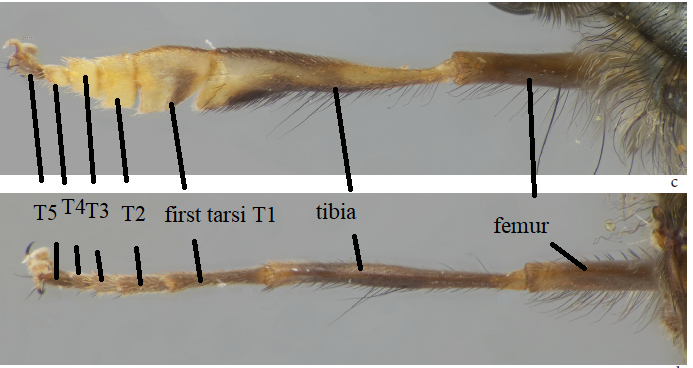
Legs

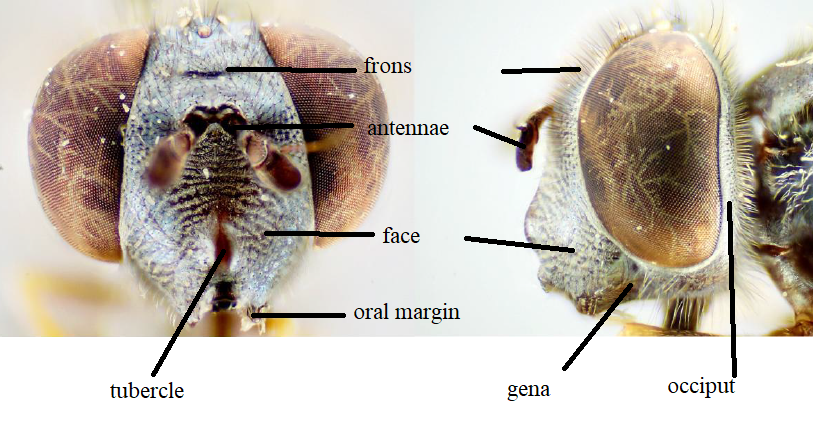
Head

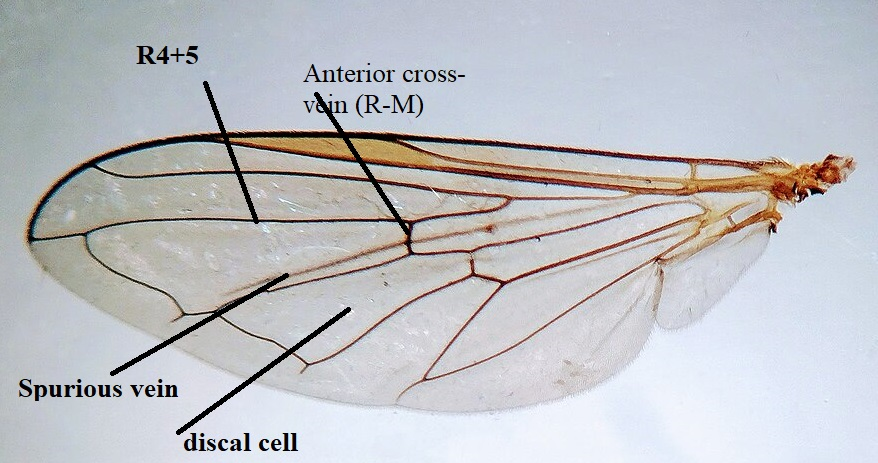
Wing

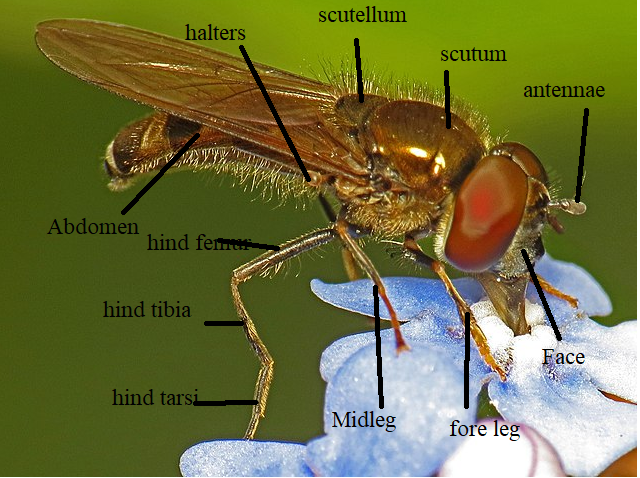
Bod

== Distribution ==
Palearctic: Britain, Ireland, Sweden, Denmark, the Netherlands and Belgium. Nearctic: Alaska south to California.

== Biology ==
Habitat: wetland; freshwater coastal marshes, fen blanket bog, cut-over raised bog, taiga wetlands. It flies May to September. The larvae are known to feed on aphids on Carex in wetlands.
