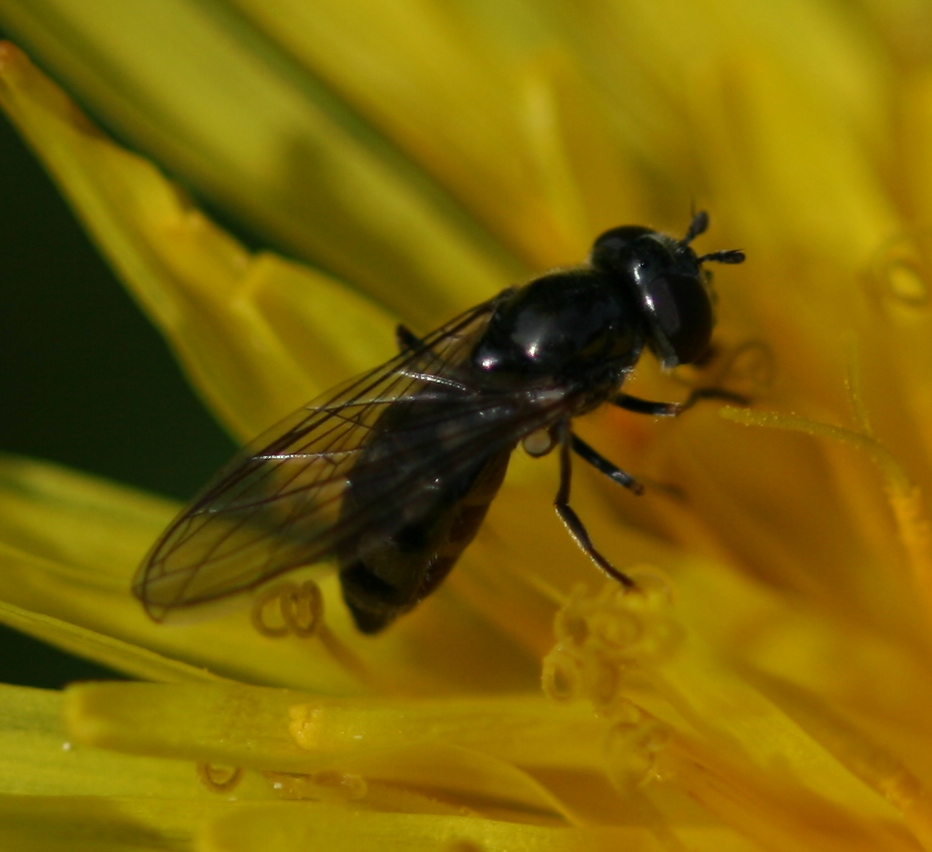
- Female

Scientific classification
- Kingdom: Animalia
- Phylum: Arthropoda
- Clade: Pancrustacea
- Class: Insecta
- Order: Diptera
- Family: Syrphidae
- Genus: Platycheirus
- Subgenus: Platycheirus
- Species: P. discimanus

Binomial name
- Platycheirus discimanus Loew, 1871

= Platycheirus discimanus =

Species of fly

Platycheirus discimanus, the yellowfoot sedgesitter, is a small species of hoverfly. It is found across Europe and the Palearctic and in North America.

== Description ==
For terminology Speight key to genera and glossary

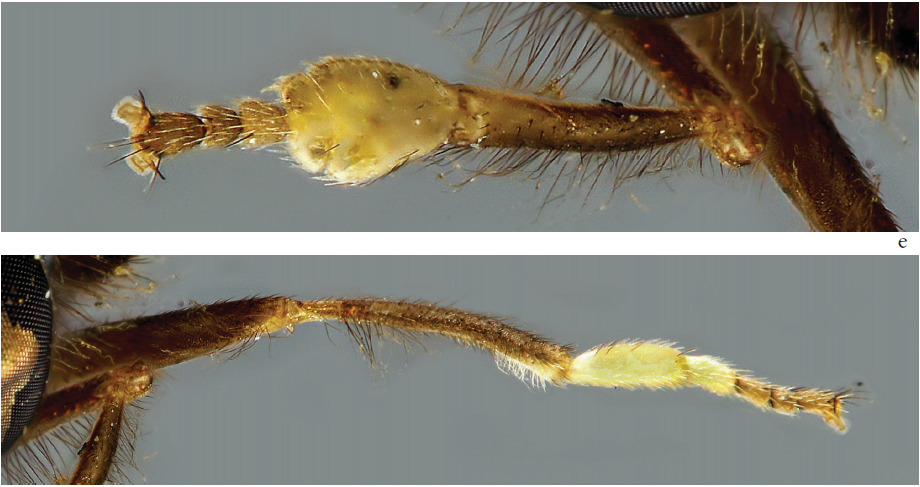
Platycheirus discimanus legs male

Length:6.2–6.8 mm (0.24–0.27 in)
Diagnosis of MALE: The face projects ventrally and dorsally with shallow median keel or ridges. It is gray pollinose except for the bare tubercle and gena. The posterior oral margin is produced forward. The legs are mostly dark, with the first two tarsomeres of the front and middle legs being pale. The front trochanter has many short, black, ventral setulae, and the front tibia has a fine, wavy pile underneath up to three times the width of the tibia. The first front tarsomere is subtriangular, truncate apically, about twice as wide as the apex of the tibia, and as long as wide. The second front tarsomere is nearly rectangular, three-fourths as wide as the first tarsomere and one-fourth as long. The other front tarsomeres are not modified. The middle tibia has dense, wavy anteroventral pile on the basal third, at the longest approximately four times the tibial diameter, and similar but fewer posterior pile on the middle third. The first middle tarsomere is laterally compressed, more than twice as deep as wide, while the second tarsomere is less strongly compressed. The remaining middle tarsomeres are unmodified. The first tarsomere of the hind leg is strongly swollen, about three times as long as its deepest point. The legs are otherwise unmodified. The thorax has dense pile, as long as the arista, and varies from white to dark brown. It is thinly gray pollinose, with bare shining areas between upper and lower pile patches on the katepisternum and on the anterior half of the posterior anepisternum. The halter is yellow, and the wing is completely microtrichose. The abdomen is narrow, with spots of tergites gray and overlaid with strong silver pollinosity. external image

Female: The female is not distinguishable from other species of Platycheirus.

See references for determination.

== Distribution ==
Palearctic: South Norway south to Belgium and France and the Alps, Ireland east through Northern Europe and Central Europe into Russia and on through Siberia to the Russian Far East and the Pacific coast at Sakhalin, Afghanistan, Mongolia and China. Nearctic: Central Canada and Pennsylvania Fauna Europaea.

== Biology ==
Habitat: It lives in deciduous forest and scrub; scrub-invaded grassland. Flies April to end May.
