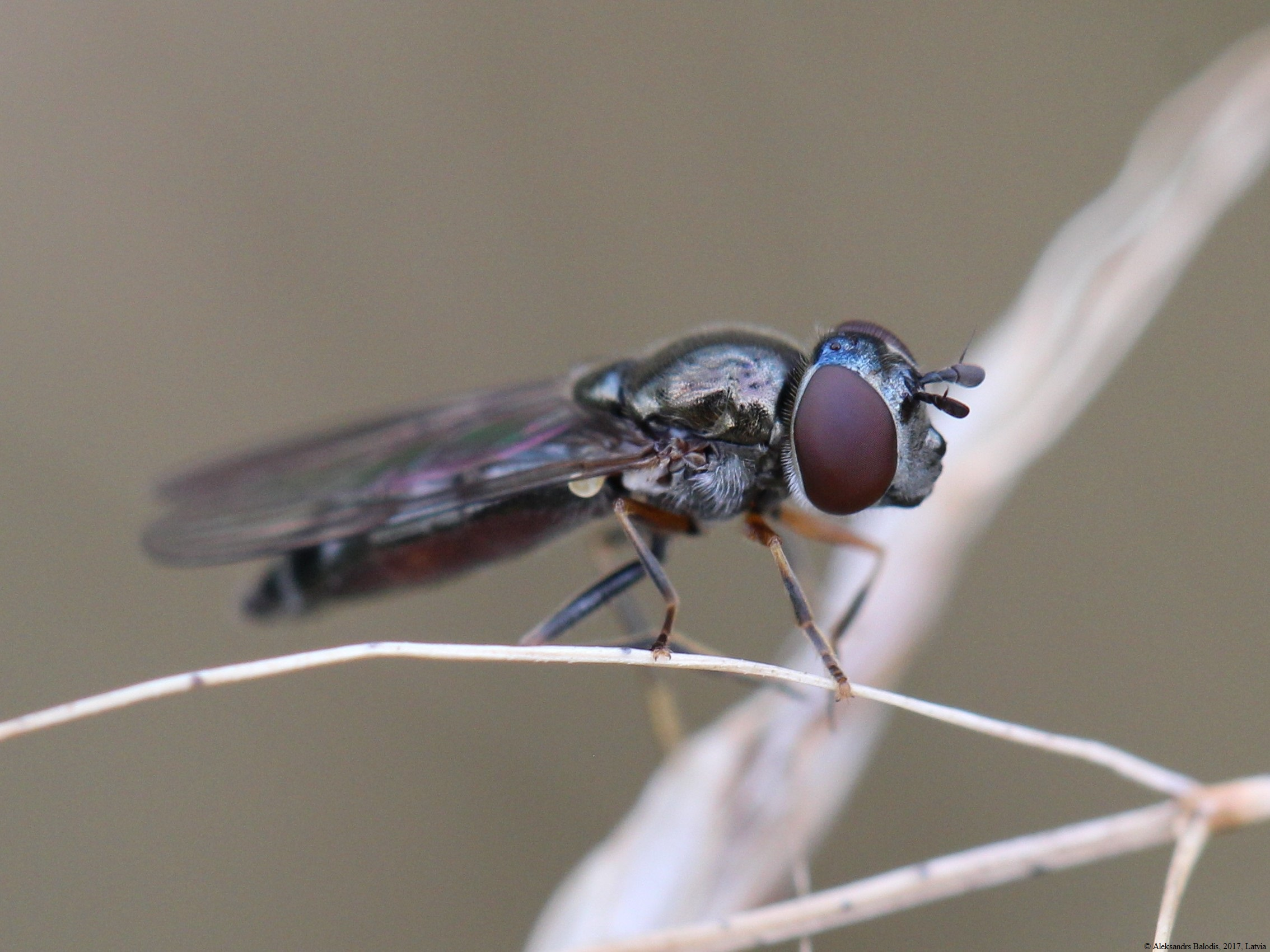

Scientific classification
- Kingdom: Animalia
- Phylum: Arthropoda
- Clade: Pancrustacea
- Class: Insecta
- Order: Diptera
- Family: Syrphidae
- Genus: Platycheirus
- Species: P. ambiguus

Binomial name
- Platycheirus ambiguus (Fallén, 1817)

Synonyms
- Scaeva ambiguus Fallén, 1817

= Platycheirus ambiguus =

Species of fly

Platycheirus ambiguus is a small widespread species of hoverfly found across the Palearctic from Ireland to Japan. A spring species found in flight in April and May, it visits spring-flowering trees and shrubs, e.g., Prunus spinosa in deciduous woodland and scrub.

The species is similar to several other small hoverflies and can be problematic to identify.

The larvae feed on aphids in various trees and shrubs.

== Description ==
External images For terms, see: Morphology of Diptera.
Haltere knob is grey brown. Frons have heavy silver-grey dusting. Tergites are marked with yellow but heavily silver-grey dusted. See references for determination.

== Distribution ==
Palearctic: Fennoscandia south to Spain, Ireland east through Europe on to the Russian Far East and the Pacific coast, including Japan.

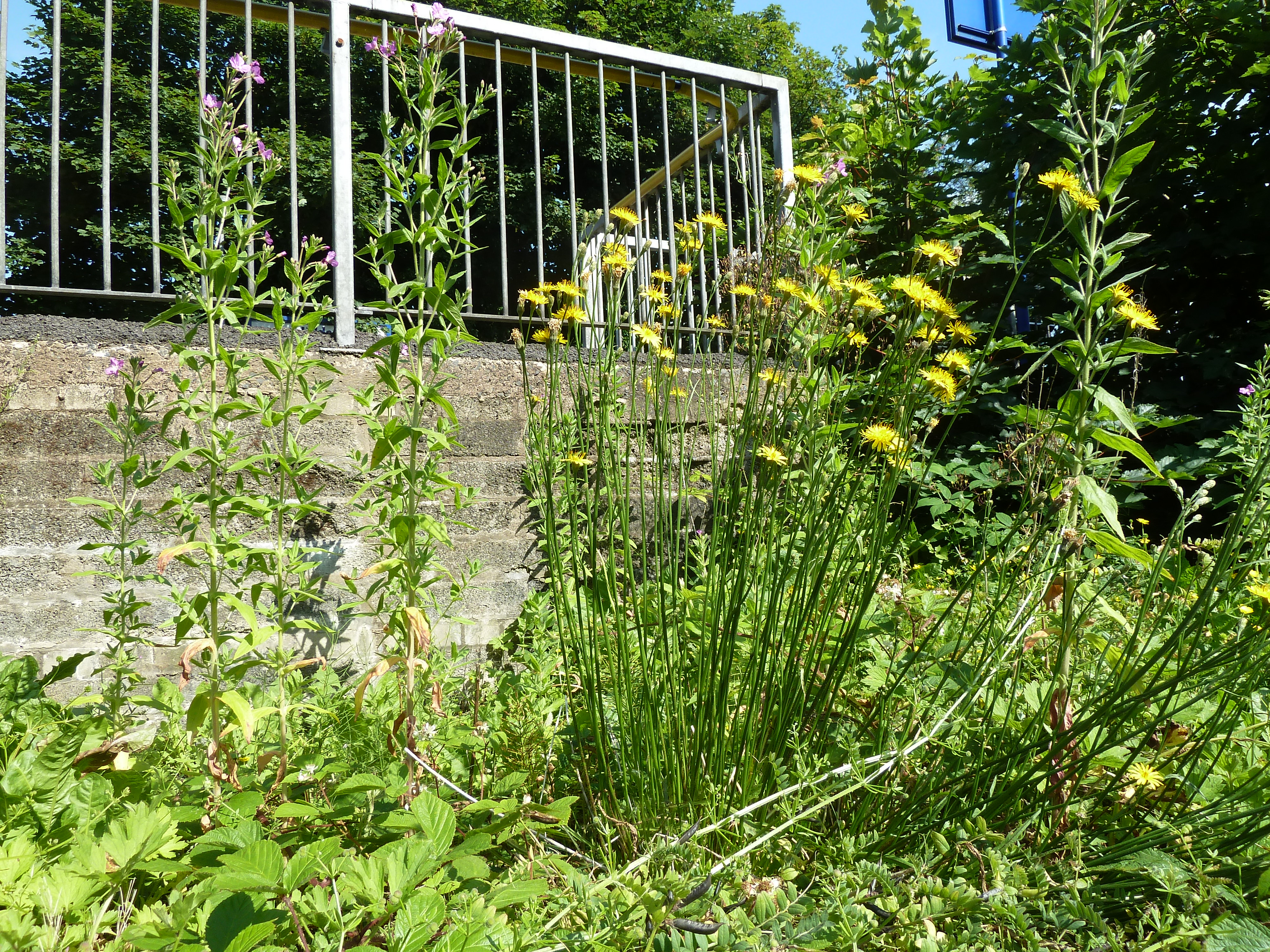
Habitat: Ireland.

== Biology ==
Habitat: deciduous forest scrub, garrigue, hedgerows and gardens. Flies April to end of May.
