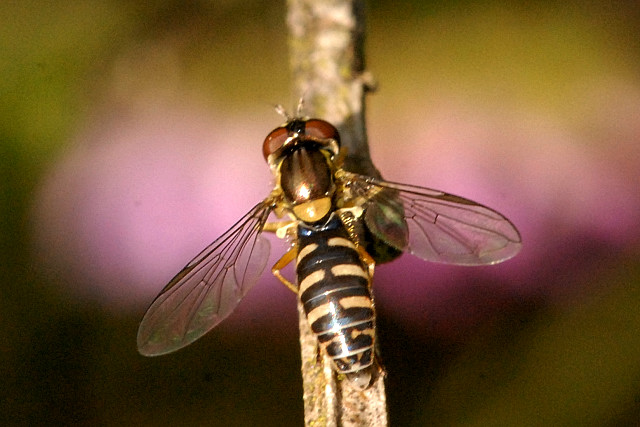
- female

Scientific classification
- Kingdom: Animalia
- Phylum: Arthropoda
- Class: Insecta
- Order: Diptera
- Family: Syrphidae
- Genus: Sphaerophoria
- Species: S. fatarum

Binomial name
- Sphaerophoria fatarum Goeldlin, 1989

= Sphaerophoria fatarum =

Species of fly

Sphaerophoria fatarum is a European species of hoverfly.

== Description ==
External images Determination requires examination of the male genitalia which are figured by Haarto and Kerppola.

== Distribution ==
Palearctic Scandinavia South to Belgium and France (Alps). Ireland eastwards through Central Europe to Switzerland and northern Italy.
