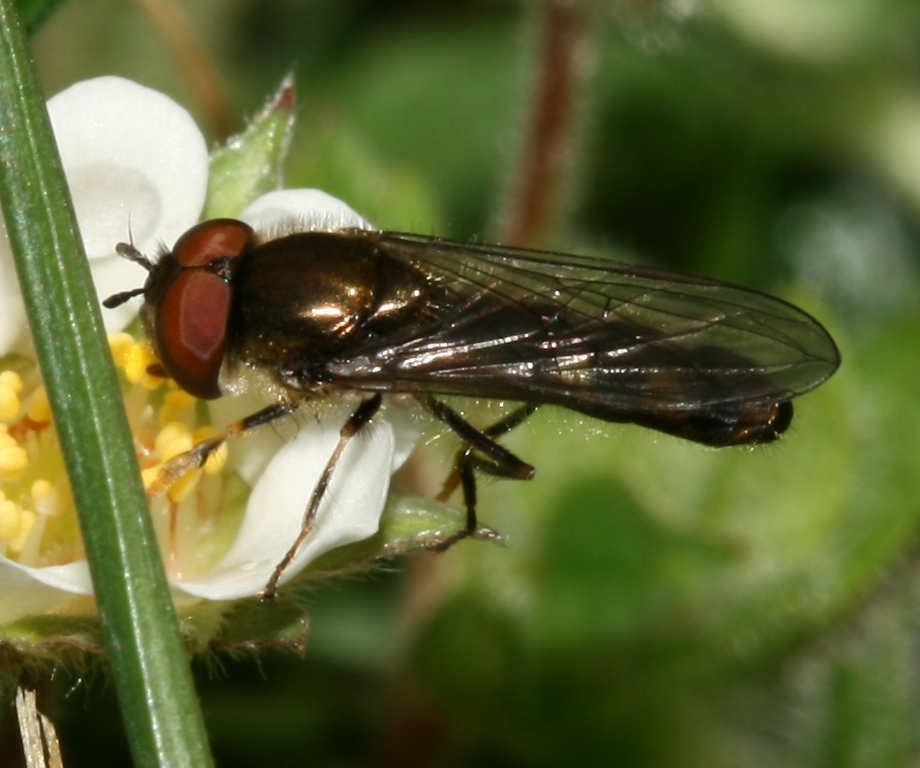
- Male
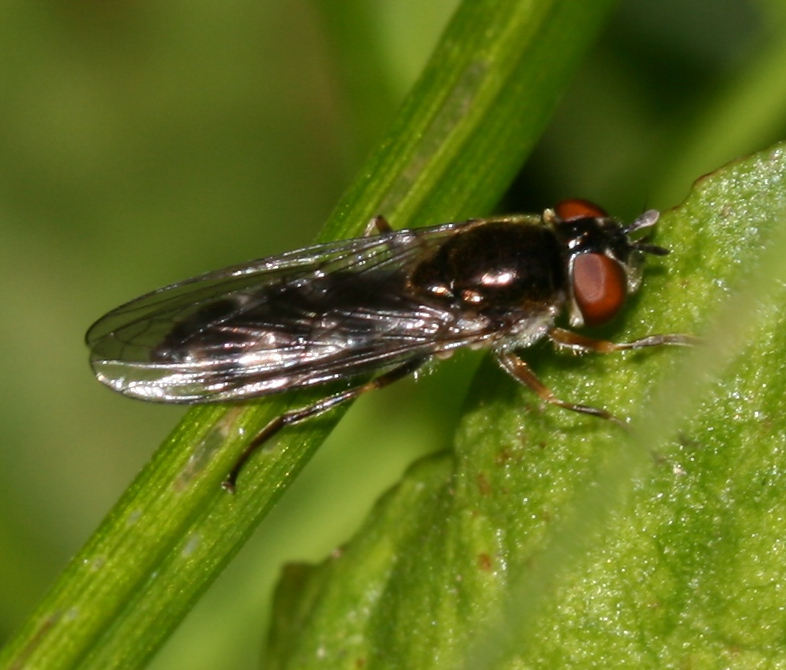
- Female

Scientific classification
- Kingdom: Animalia
- Phylum: Arthropoda
- Clade: Pancrustacea
- Class: Insecta
- Order: Diptera
- Family: Syrphidae
- Genus: Platycheirus
- Subgenus: Platycheirus
- Species: P. albimanus

Binomial name
- Platycheirus albimanus (Fabricius, 1781)

Synonyms
- Platycheirus cyaneus (Walker, 1851); Syrphus albimanus Fabricius 1781); Syrphus cyaneus Walker, 1851

= Platycheirus albimanus =

Species of fly

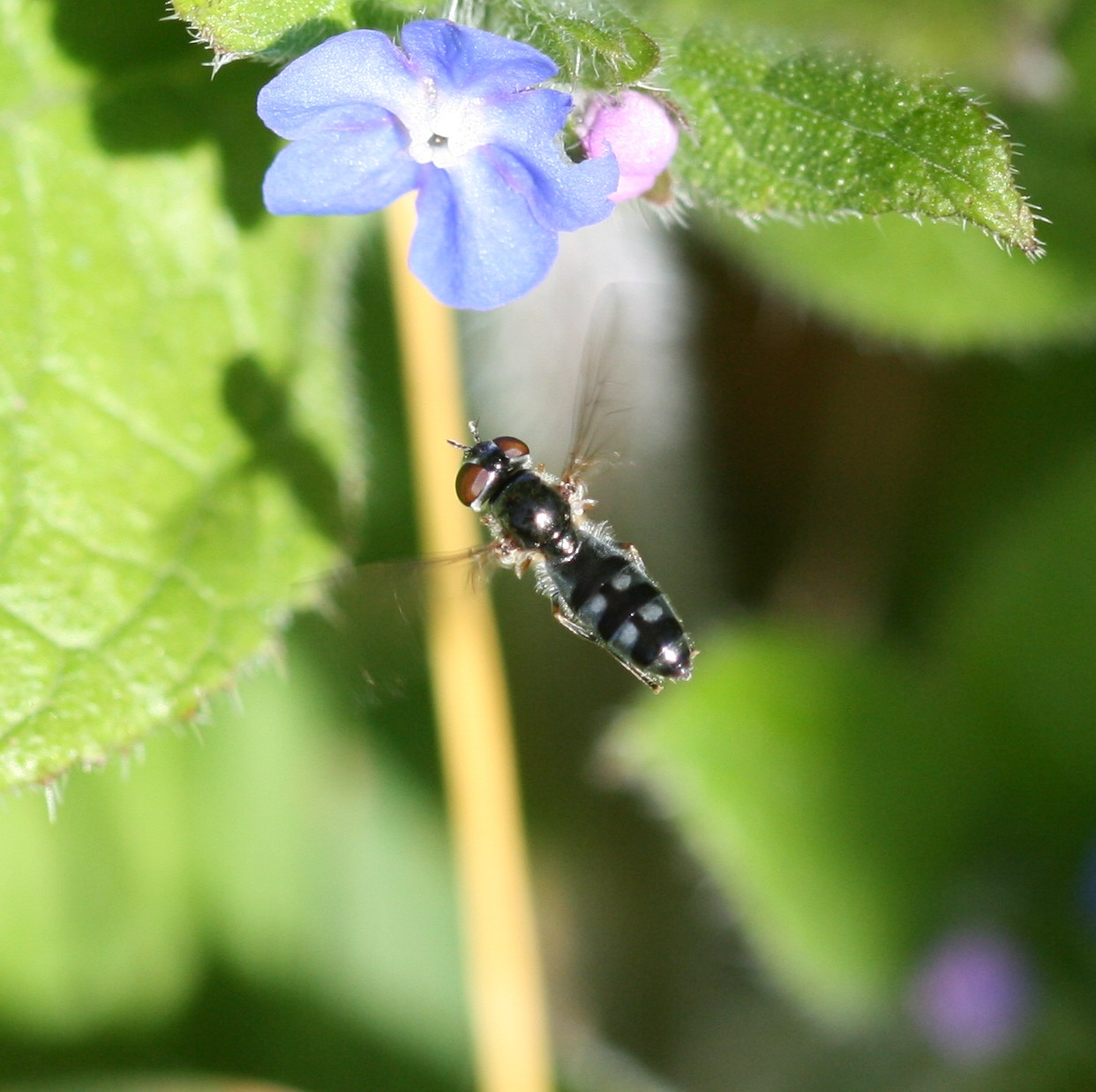
female in flight

Platycheirus albimanus on Tanacetum vulgare (video, 1m 40s)

Platycheirus albimanus is a common widespread species of hoverfly. A holarctic species its range includes Greenland, Iceland, Britain, mainland Europe, Russia, across Siberia to the pacific coast, the Philippines, Alaska, western Canada and United States.

The larvae feed on aphids on a wide range of plants, shrubs and trees.

Adults can be found in flight generally between April and October on the edges of woodland or scrub, heath or along hedgerows where they visit a wide range of flowers.

== Description ==
External images

external images For terms see Morphology of Diptera
Wing cell bm with a small to rather large bare area (not trichose) Tibiae 1 abruptly dilated shortly before the apex. Metatarsus 1 posterior edge slightly curved. Face in front view, dusted silverish. Tergites with markings silvery or obscure yellow. Extremely similar in appearance to the southern European P. muelleri and the northern European P. nigrofemoratus and P. urakawensis.
