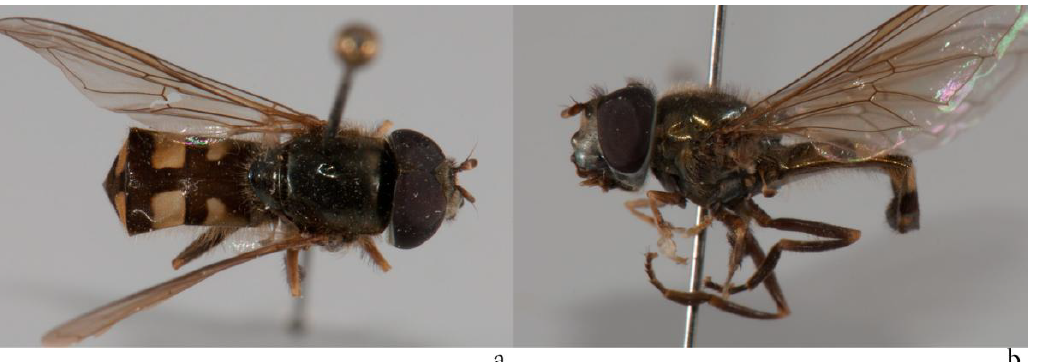
- Male

Scientific classification
- Kingdom: Animalia
- Phylum: Arthropoda
- Clade: Pancrustacea
- Class: Insecta
- Order: Diptera
- Family: Syrphidae
- Genus: Platycheirus
- Subgenus: Platycheirus
- Species: P. amplus

Binomial name
- Platycheirus amplus Curran, 1927

Synonyms
- Platychirus amplus Curran, 1927

= Platycheirus amplus =

Species of fly

Platycheirus amplus, the broadhand sedgesitter, is a rare Holarctic species of hoverfly found in wetlands, fens, moorland streams and bogs.

== Description ==
External images and map For terminology see Speight key to genera and glossary or Glossary of morphological terminology

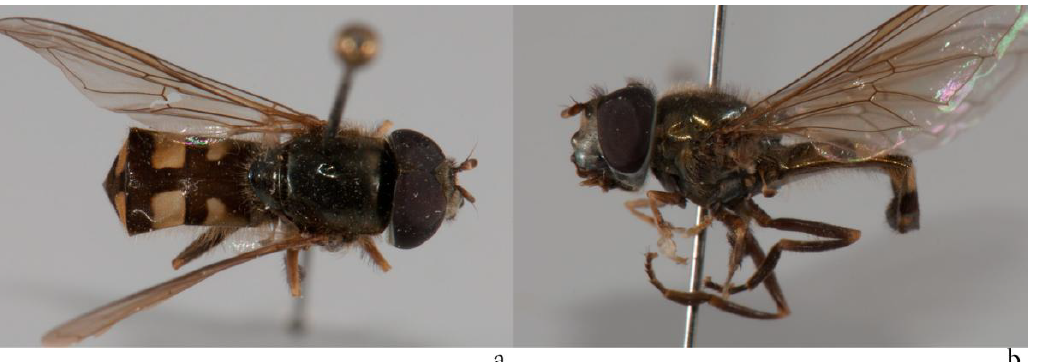
Figure 1. P. amplus male by Andrew Young

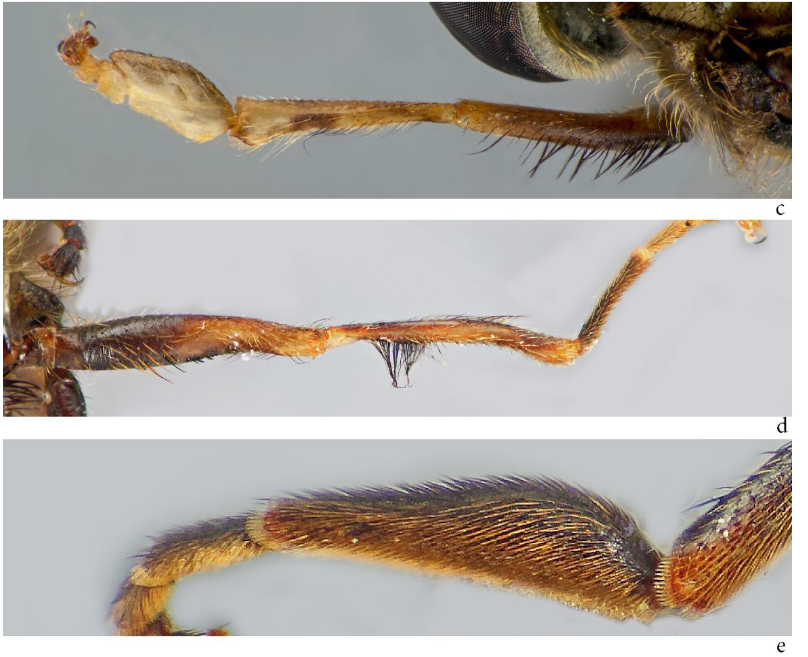
Figure 2. P. amplus male legs front(top) mid and hind(bottom) by Andrew Young

Figure 3. syrphid wing by Giancarlo Dessì

See references for determination.

Note
See "general anatomy" below for diagrams of Syrphid (not this species) parts
Head
The face is moderately projecting ventrally, with the anterior oral margin produced forward but not reaching the level of the tubercle. It is densely covered with yellow pollen and features a shining tubercle. (Figure 1)
Legs
The fore tibia is broadened from the base and then more strongly broadened on the apical fifth. The first fore tarsomere is strongly flattened, about twice as long as wide, and features a weak dorsal keel apically. The second fore tarsomere is flattened, approximately as long as wide, and half the width of the first. The remaining fore tarsomeres are unmodified.(see figure 2 top) The mid-femur has a shallow anterior excavation located about three-quarters of its length, bordered by short, strong black setulae. The mid-tibia is slightly swollen near the base and has a tuft of dense, wavy black pile that can be up to three times the tibial diameter on the subbasal swelling.(Figure 2 middle) The hind leg, except for the narrow apex of the femur and the base of the tibia, is dark. The first hind tarsomere is swollen basally and tapers uniformly to a narrow apex.(Figure 2 bottom)
Thorax
The thorax is sparsely covered with yellow or grey pollen. The scutellar hairs are approximately as long as the arista. The scutal hair is mostly white, with some black hairs near the margins.
Wings
The wing is usually slightly brown-tinted, with very small bare areas located at the bases of cells c and bm. (Figure 3)
Abdomen
The abdomen has yellow spots on tergites 2 to 5. Segment 2 features small, variable-shaped spots located at mid-length. Segments 3 and 4 have large, rectangular spots that touch the front margin. Segment 5 contains small, triangular spots that also touch the front margin.

General Anatomy click to enlarge

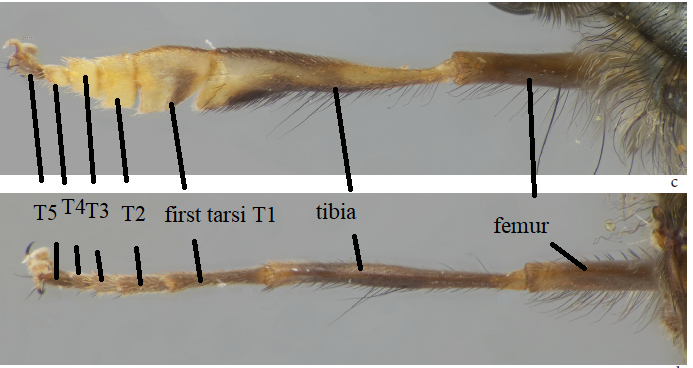
Legs

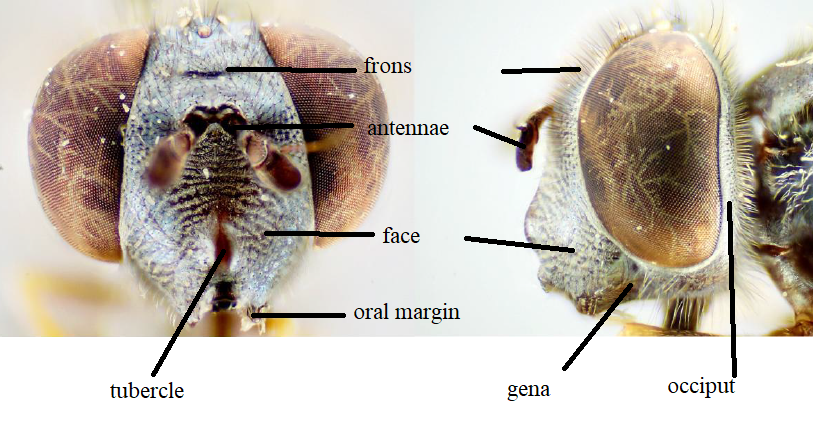
Head

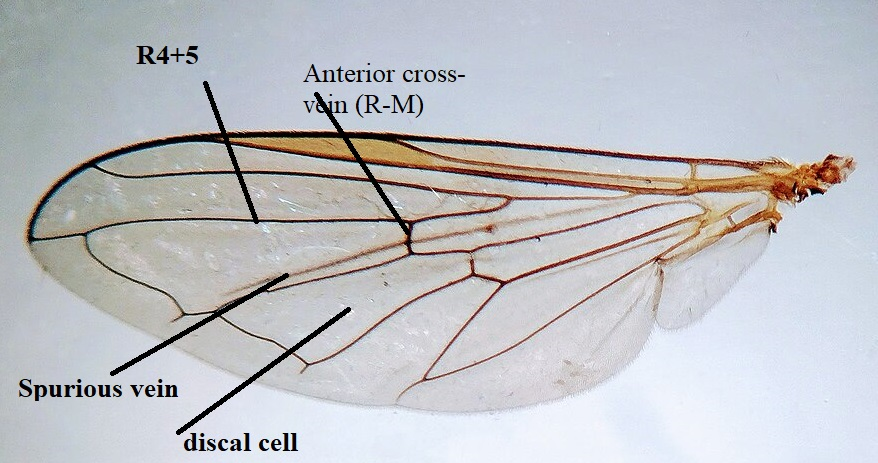
Wing

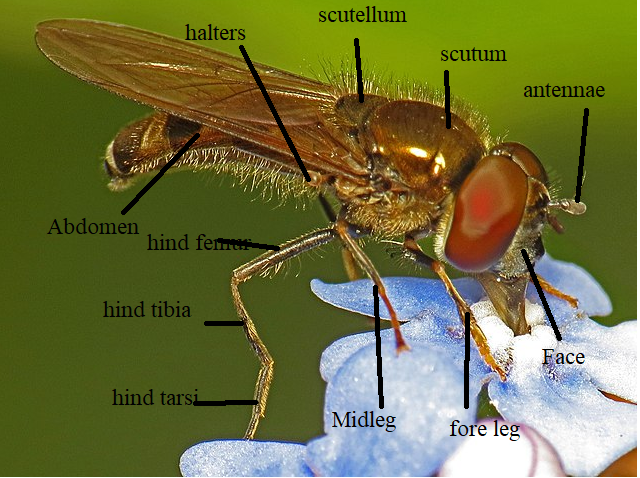
Body

== Distribution ==
Palearctic: Britain, Ireland, Sweden, Denmark, the Netherlands and Belgium. Nearctic: Alaska south to California.

== Biology ==
Habitat: fen and poor fen, flushes and brooks in moor and bog. It flies June to July. Playcheirus larvae feed on aphids on various low-growing plants and bushes.
