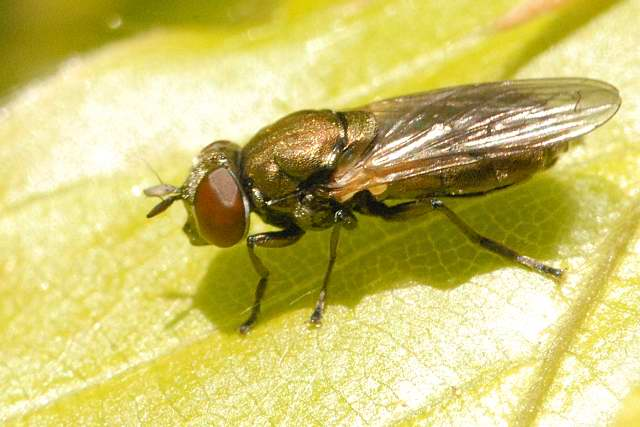
- Orthonevra geniculata female

Scientific classification
- Kingdom: Animalia
- Phylum: Arthropoda
- Class: Insecta
- Order: Diptera
- Family: Syrphidae
- Genus: Orthonevra
- Species: O. geniculata

Binomial name
- Orthonevra geniculata Meigen, 1822

= Orthonevra geniculata =

Species of fly

Orthonevra geniculata is a species of hoverfly found in the Palearctic.

== Description ==
External images For terms see Morphology of Diptera
Wing length 4·5-5·5 mm. Face with triangular white marks. Legs yellow. Wing vein r-m brown. Pterostigm bicolorous: pale with dark area at base. Maibach et al. (1994) figure the male terminalia. See references for determination.

== Distribution ==
Palearctic North Norway to Belgium. Ireland East through North Europe and Central Europe. North Italy. European Russia to the Russian Far East, Siberia and Mongolia.

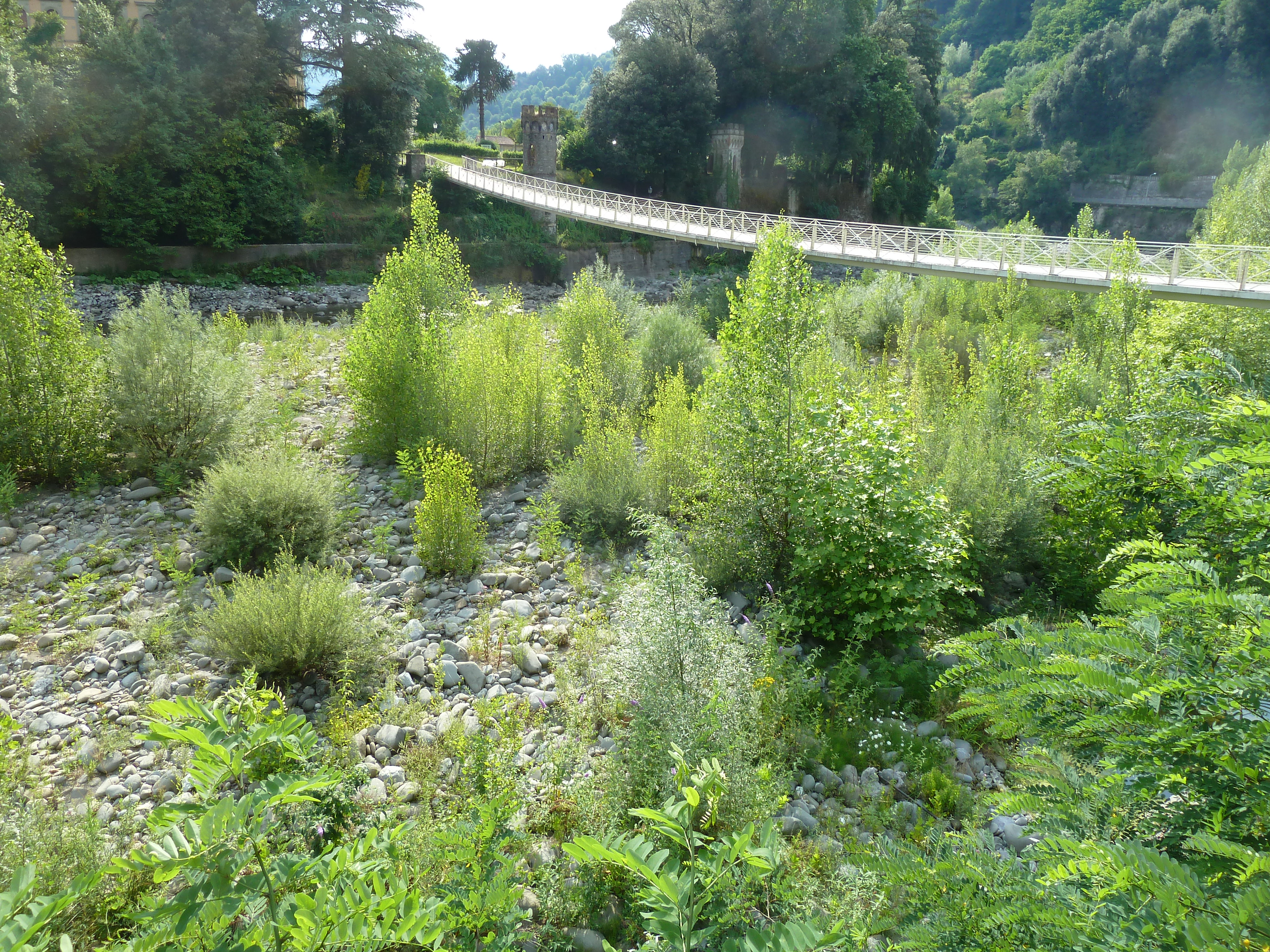
Habitat.Italy

== Biology ==
Habitat: Quercus forest (beside springs, flushes and brooks). Alnus and Salix habitats carr, fen and margins of raised bogs. Flowers visited include Anemone nemorosa, Bellis, Caltha, Cardamine, Malus sylvestris, Menyanthes, Prunus spinosa, Ranunculus, Salix, The flight period is mid April to mid May.The larva is associated with springs and wet flushes.
