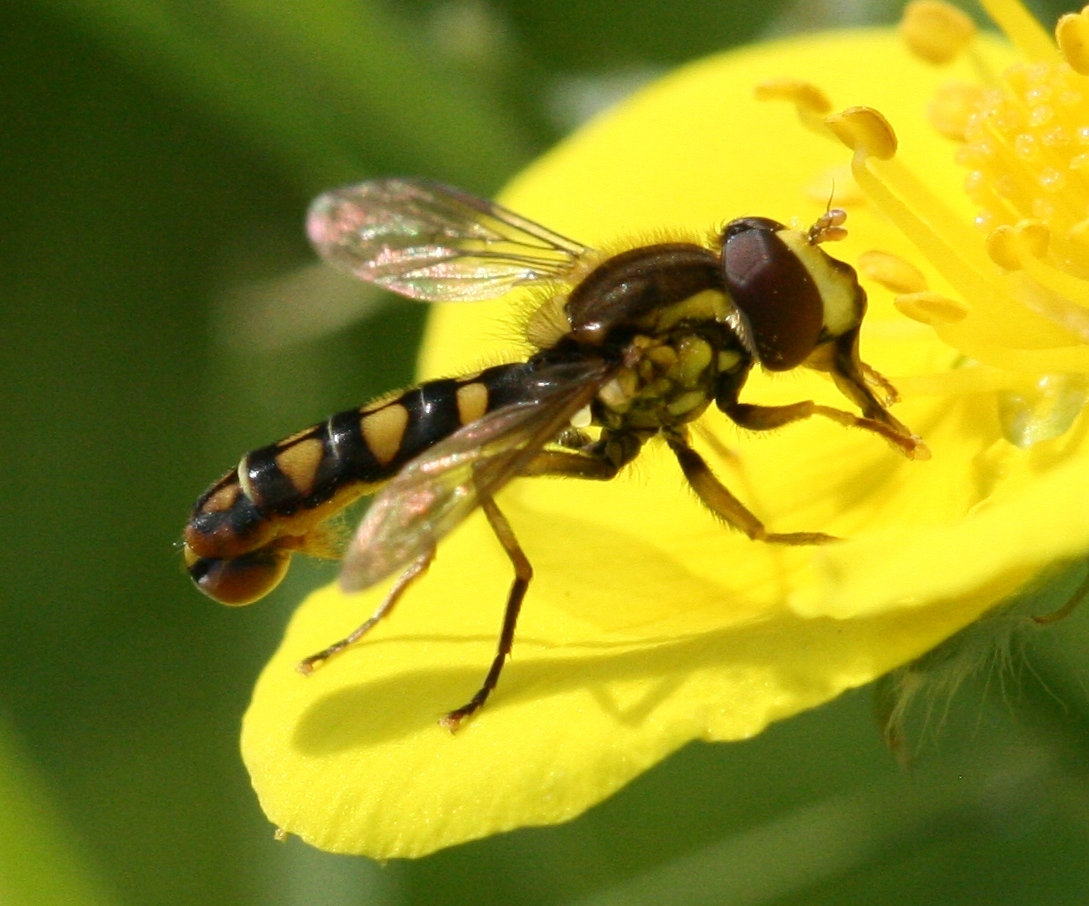
- male

Scientific classification
- Kingdom: Animalia
- Phylum: Arthropoda
- Class: Insecta
- Order: Diptera
- Family: Syrphidae
- Genus: Sphaerophoria
- Species: S. rueppellii

Binomial name
- Sphaerophoria rueppellii (Wiedemann, 1820)

Synonyms
- Syrphus rueppellii Wiedemann, 1820; Sphaerophoria flavicauda Zetterstedt, 1843; Sphaerophoria nitidicollis Zetterstedt, 1849

= Sphaerophoria rueppellii =

Species of fly

Sphaerophoria rueppellii is a European species of hoverfly. Larvae are predators of aphids, and the species has been commercialized for biological pest control of aphids. The larvae go through three instars.
