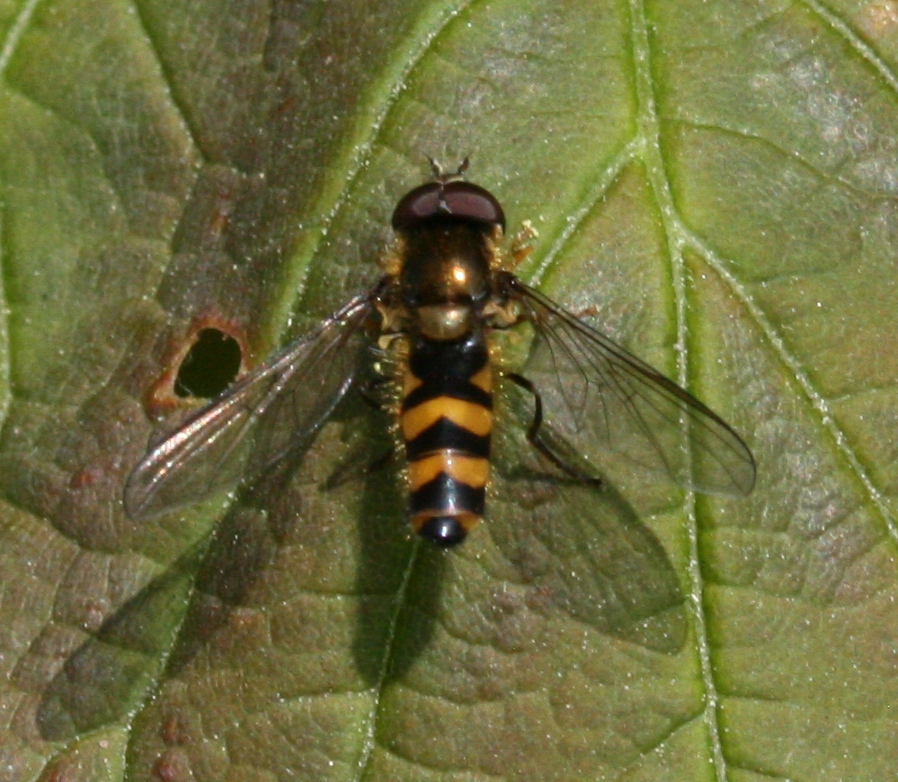
- male

Scientific classification
- Kingdom: Animalia
- Phylum: Arthropoda
- Class: Insecta
- Order: Diptera
- Family: Syrphidae
- Subfamily: Syrphinae
- Tribe: Syrphini
- Genus: Fagisyrphus
- Species: F. cinctus

Binomial name
- Fagisyrphus cinctus (Fallén, 1817)

Synonyms
- Scaeva cincta Fallén, 1817; Melangyna cincta (Fallén, 1817); Meligramma cincta (Fallén, 1817); Syrphus placidus Meigen, 1822

= Fagisyrphus =

Species of fly

Fagisyrphus cinctus is a European species of hoverfly. This species has a muddled taxonomic history. Older authors treated it as a member of the genus Melangyna, and later sources in Meligramma (as either a separate genus or a subgenus of Melangyna), but the most recent sources recognize it as the sole species in its own monotypic genus, Fagisyrphus.

== Description ==
External images For terms see Morphology of Diptera
Wing length 6 ·25–8·75 mm. Tergites 3 and 4 with yellow to orange bands. Tergite 2 with two yellow, triangular marks. Elongate abdomen. See references for determination. The male genitalia are figured by Dusek and Laska (1967). The larva is figured in colour by Rotheray (1994).

== Distribution ==
Palearctic Fennoscandia South to Iberia and the Mediterranean. Ireland Eastwards through Europe into European Russia, the Crimea and Turkey.

== Biology ==
Habitat: Fagus and Quercus woodland. Flowers visited include white umbellifers, Acer pseudoplatanus, Crataegus, Ligustrum, Malus sylvestris, Prunus spinosa, Rubus idaeus, Salix, Sambucus nigra, Sorbus aucupariae, Urtica dioica, Viburnus opulus. The flight period is April to July in two generations. The larva feeds on aphids.
