= Cheilosia velutina =

Scientific classification
- Kingdom: Animalia
- Phylum: Arthropoda
- Clade: Pancrustacea
- Class: Insecta
- Order: Diptera
- Family: Syrphidae
- Genus: Cheilosia
- Species: C. velutina

Binomial name
- Cheilosia velutina Loew 1840

Species of fly

Cheilosia velutina is a Palearctic hoverfly.

== Description ==
External images For terms see Morphology of Diptera
Cheilosia velutina has the face swollen but the moderately glossy central knob poorly developed (flat) and the upper mouth-edge is vertical. Ihe face has a dense grey coating. Tergite 2 of the female has an undulating band of adpressed whitish hairs, tergites 3 and 4 also have pale hair bands. Eyes in upper half with light-colored hairs.

== Distribution ==
Scandinavia South to Spain and Ireland East through Europe into Russia, and on through Siberia and the Russian Far East.

== Habitat ==
Deciduous forest, scrub and unimproved grassland.

== Biology ==
Males hover up to 5m. near trees and shrubs, beside streams and tracks; both sexes settle on foliage up to 5m. Flight is low, very fast and very direct. Flowers visited include Achillea, Anemone nemorosa, Anthemis, Bellis, Caltha, Chrysanthemum, Galium, Potentilla erecta, Prunus spinosa, Ranunculus, Rorippa andRanunculus. Flies July to August. The larva mines the stems of Cirsium palustre and the rhizome of Scrophularia nodosa.
