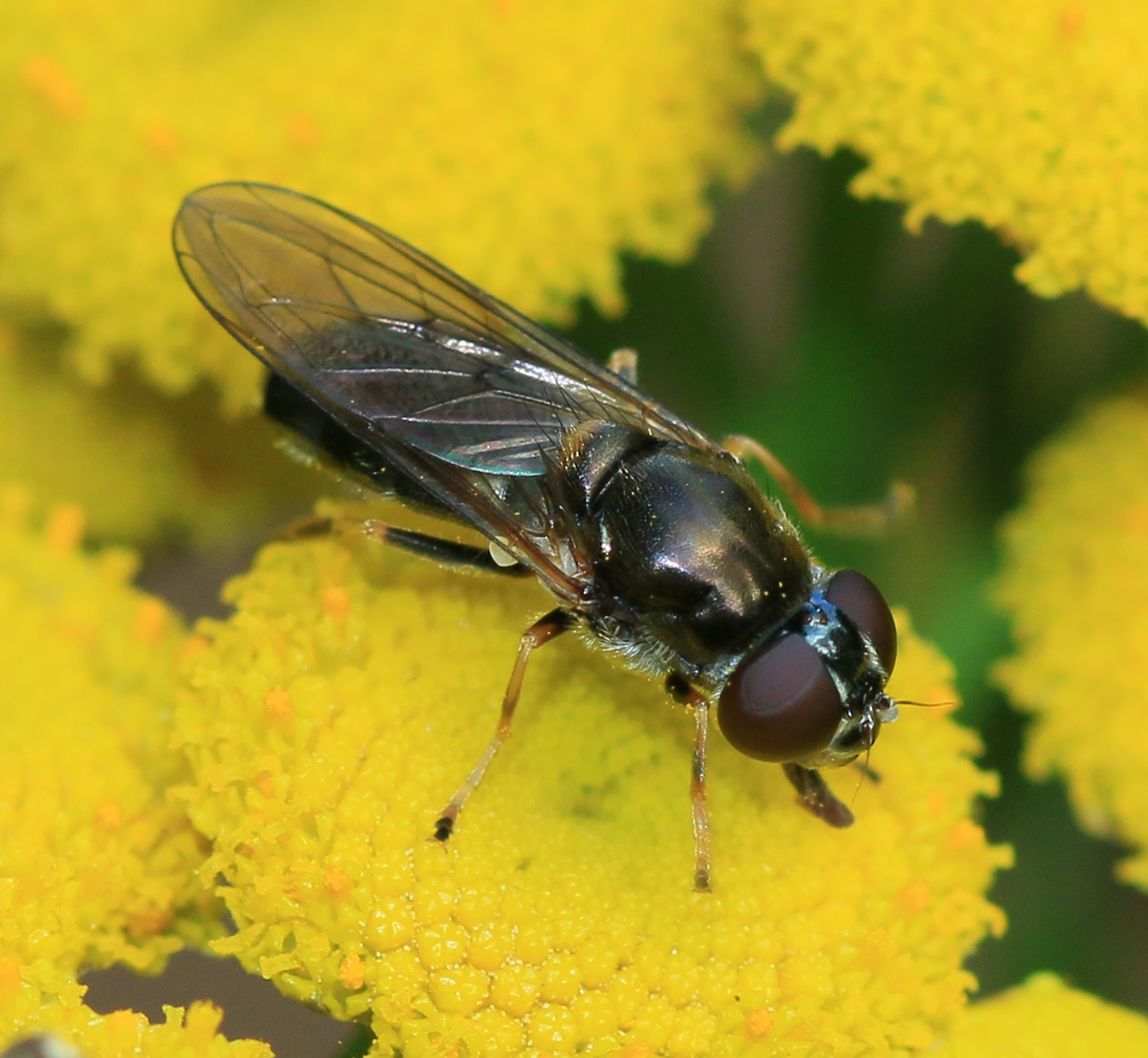
- Cheilosia scutellata female

Scientific classification
- Kingdom: Animalia
- Phylum: Arthropoda
- Clade: Pancrustacea
- Class: Insecta
- Order: Diptera
- Family: Syrphidae
- Genus: Cheilosia
- Species: C. scutellata

Binomial name
- Cheilosia scutellata (Fallen, 1817)

= Cheilosia scutellata =

Species of fly

Cheilosia scutellata is a Palearctic hoverfly.

== Description ==
For terms see Morphology of Diptera
Eyes and face glabrous. Fused antennal pits.3rd segment of antenna black or dark yellowish brown. Arista with distinct short hairs. Rather long wings and alar base transparent (not yellow). Median facial tubercle broad, developed across full width of face. Mesonotum with minute black punctation. Partially red legs. Identification via Van Veen, Van der Goot and, Stubbs and Falk, Coe The larva is described and figured by Rotheray (1994).

== Distribution ==
Fennoscandia South to Iberia and the Mediterranean basin to Greece, Turkey. North Africa. Ireland east to Russian Far East to the Pacific coast.

== Habitat ==
Forest in the North and maquis in the South.

== Biology ==
Found on low-growing vegetation also along tracks and at the edges of clearings. Flowers visited include Chaerophyllum, Cirsium, Cistus, Crataegus, Galium, Hedera, Hieracium, Ranunculus and Sorbus. Flies May to September North Europe and April to November) in South Europe. The larva feeds on basidiomycete fungi, especially Boletus and Suillus .
