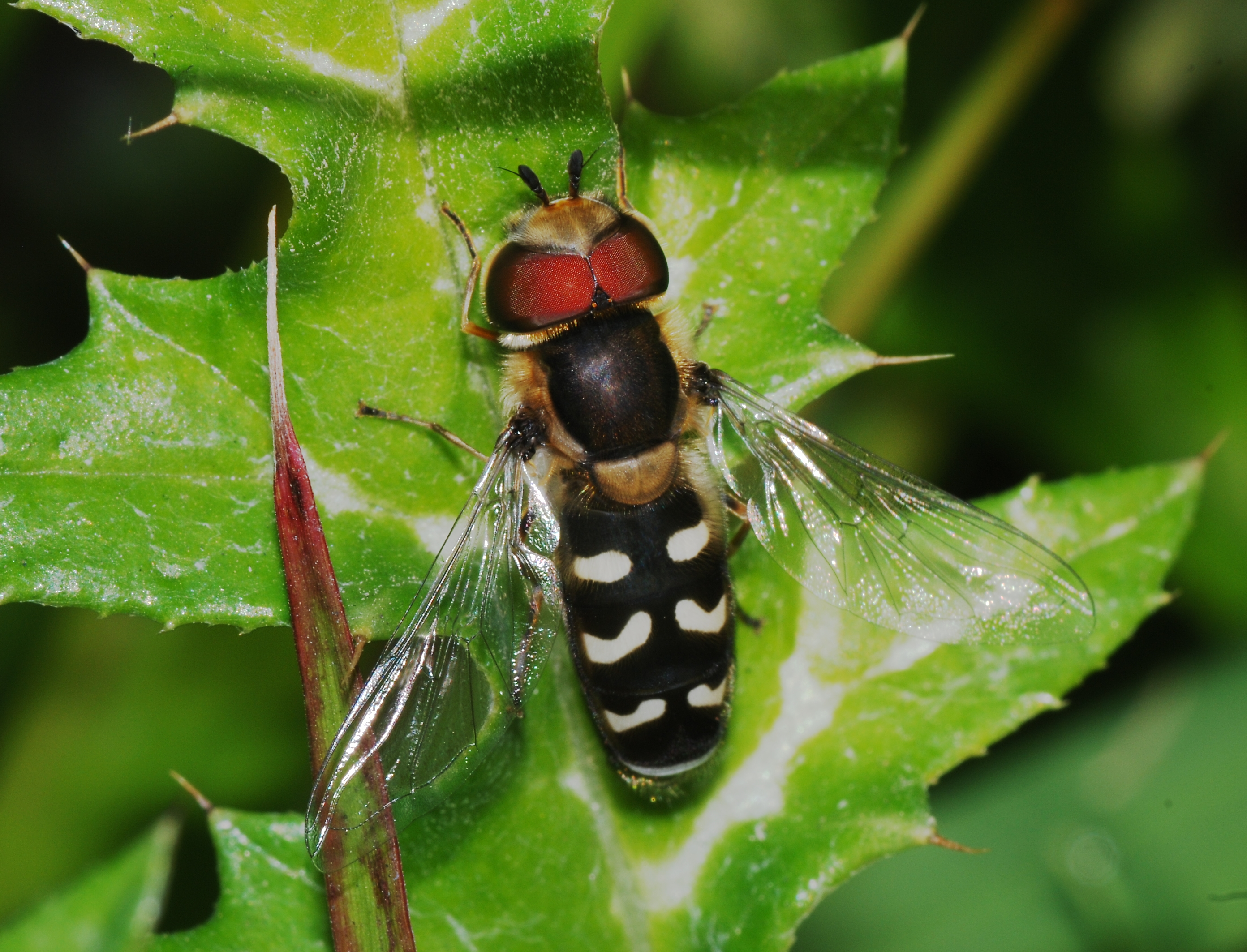
- Scaeva pyrastri male

Scientific classification
- Kingdom: Animalia
- Phylum: Arthropoda
- Class: Insecta
- Order: Diptera
- Family: Syrphidae
- Tribe: Syrphini
- Genus: Scaeva; Fabricius, 1805

Synonyms
- Catabomba Osten Sacken, 1877; Lasiopthicu Rondani, 1845

= Scaeva =

Genus of flies

Scaeva is a genus of hoverflies. The taxonomy of the genus, and the related genera Simosyrphus and Ischiodon has been discussed by Láska et al. (2006)

== Species ==
- Scaeva affinis (Say, 1823)
- Scaeva albomaculata (Macquart, 1842)
- Scaeva dignota (Rondani, 1857)
- Scaeva latimaculata (Brunetti, 1923)
- Scaeva mecogramma (Bigot, 1860)
- Scaeva pyrastri (Linnaeus, 1758)
- Scaeva selenitica (Meigen, 1822)
