= Melangyna ambustus =

Scientific classification
- Kingdom: Animalia
- Phylum: Arthropoda
- Class: Insecta
- Order: Diptera
- Family: Syrphidae
- Genus: Melangyna
- Species: M. ambustus

Binomial name
- Melangyna ambustus Walker, 1852

Species of hoverfly

Melangyna (Austrosyrphus) ambustus is a species of hoverfly found in south-east Australia, mainly New South Wales.

== Description ==
The head of M. ambustus is steel-blue, with a dull pale twinge to each side. Eyes are a dark red, abdomen black, legs also black. It is hoary haired over much of its body. Antennae dark, red underneath. Frons weakly dusted.
