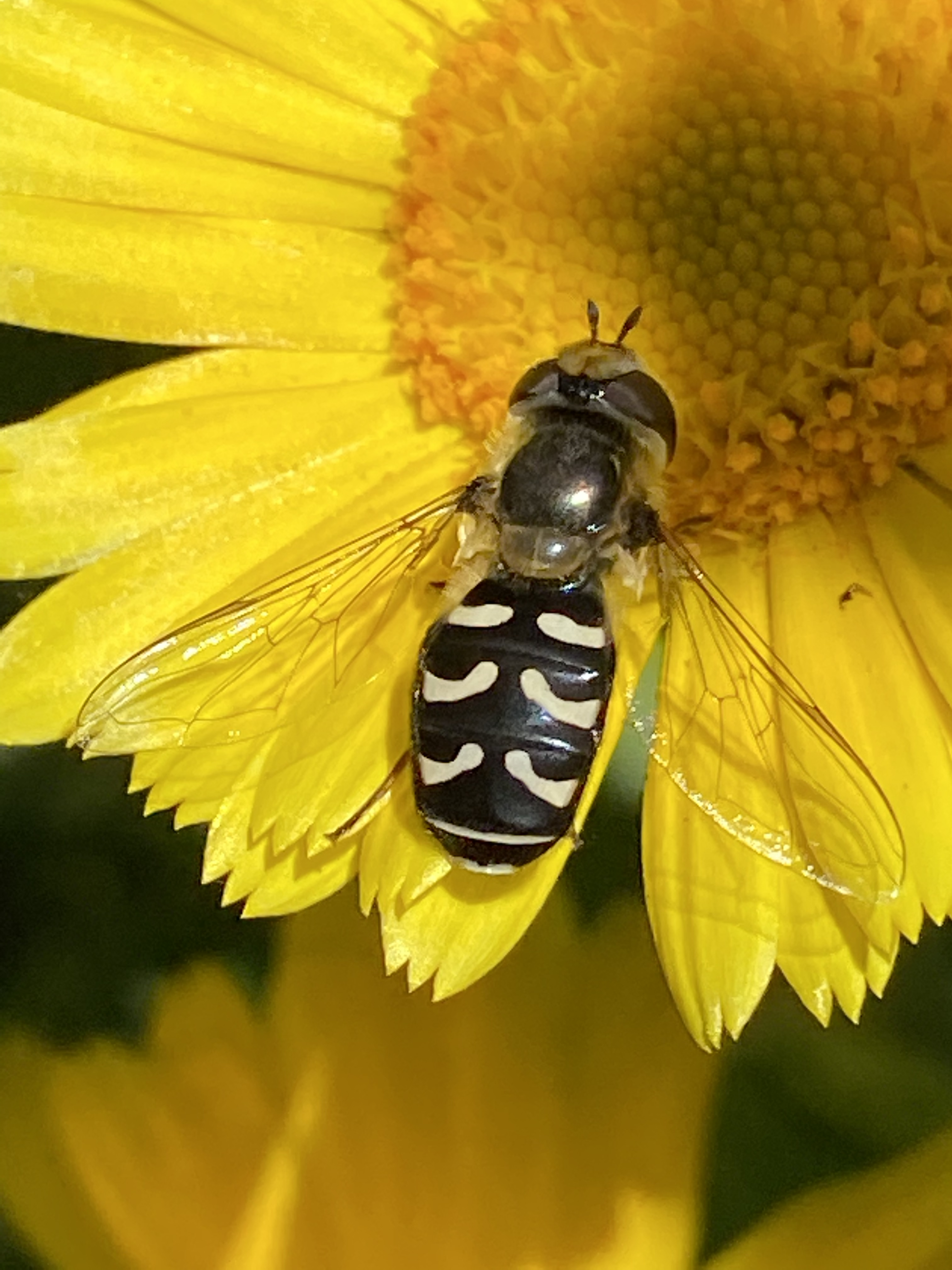

Scientific classification
- Domain: Eukaryota
- Kingdom: Animalia
- Phylum: Arthropoda
- Class: Insecta
- Order: Diptera
- Family: Syrphidae
- Subfamily: Syrphinae
- Tribe: Syrphini
- Genus: Scaeva
- Species: S. affinis

Binomial name
- Scaeva affinis (Say, 1823)

= Scaeva affinis =

North American hoverfly

Scaeva affinis, commonly known as the white-bowed smoothwing, is a species of hoverfly found in western North America. The larval form feeds voraciously on aphids. Scaeva affinis is the only Scaeva likely to be encountered in the Nearctic realm, where it is common in the west and rare in the east. This species is believed to be migratory. In 1823, Thomas Say originally described it as "tergum black with three yellow lunules on each side...inhabits Arkansa." S. affinis was later combined with (and then determined to be a distinct species and was split back off from) Scaeva pyrastri.
