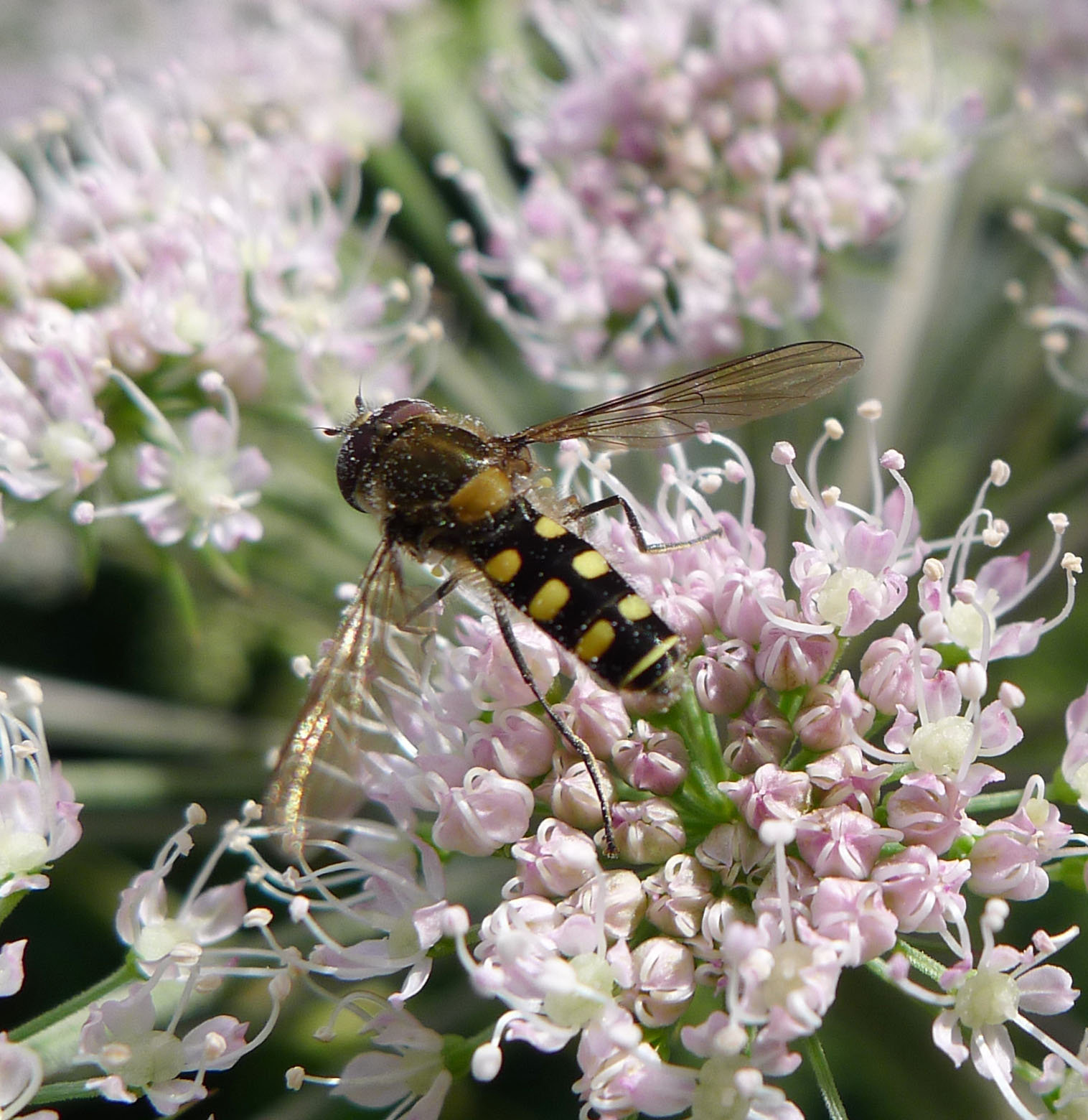
- Melangyna compositarum

Scientific classification
- Kingdom: Animalia
- Phylum: Arthropoda
- Class: Insecta
- Order: Diptera
- Family: Syrphidae
- Genus: Melangyna
- Species: M. compositarum

Binomial name
- Melangyna compositarum (Verrall, 1873)

Synonyms

= Melangyna compositarum =

Species of fly

Melangyna compositarum is a Holarctic species of hoverfly.

== Description ==
External images Wing length: 5.25–8.5 mm (0.207–0.335 in).The face is narrower and shinier than in Melangyna labiatarum . In males, the sides of the face are almost parallel and the eyes are very slightly hairy. The thorax is shinier than in M. labiatarum male. See references for determination. The male terminalia are figured by Hippa (1968) ). The larva is undescribed.

== Distribution ==
Palearctic Fennoscandia South to the Pyrenees and northern Spain. Ireland eastwards through North Europe and Central Europe northern Italy and Yugoslavia. Then East into European Russia and Siberia from the Urals to the Pacific coast (Kuril Islands) Nearctic Alaska South through the Rocky mountains to New Mexico.

== Biology ==
Habitat: Larix, Pinus forests. Arboreal, but descends to visit flowers of white Umbelliferae, Galium, Sorbus aucuparia. The flight period is end May to September (July to September at higher altitudes). The larva feeds on aphids.
