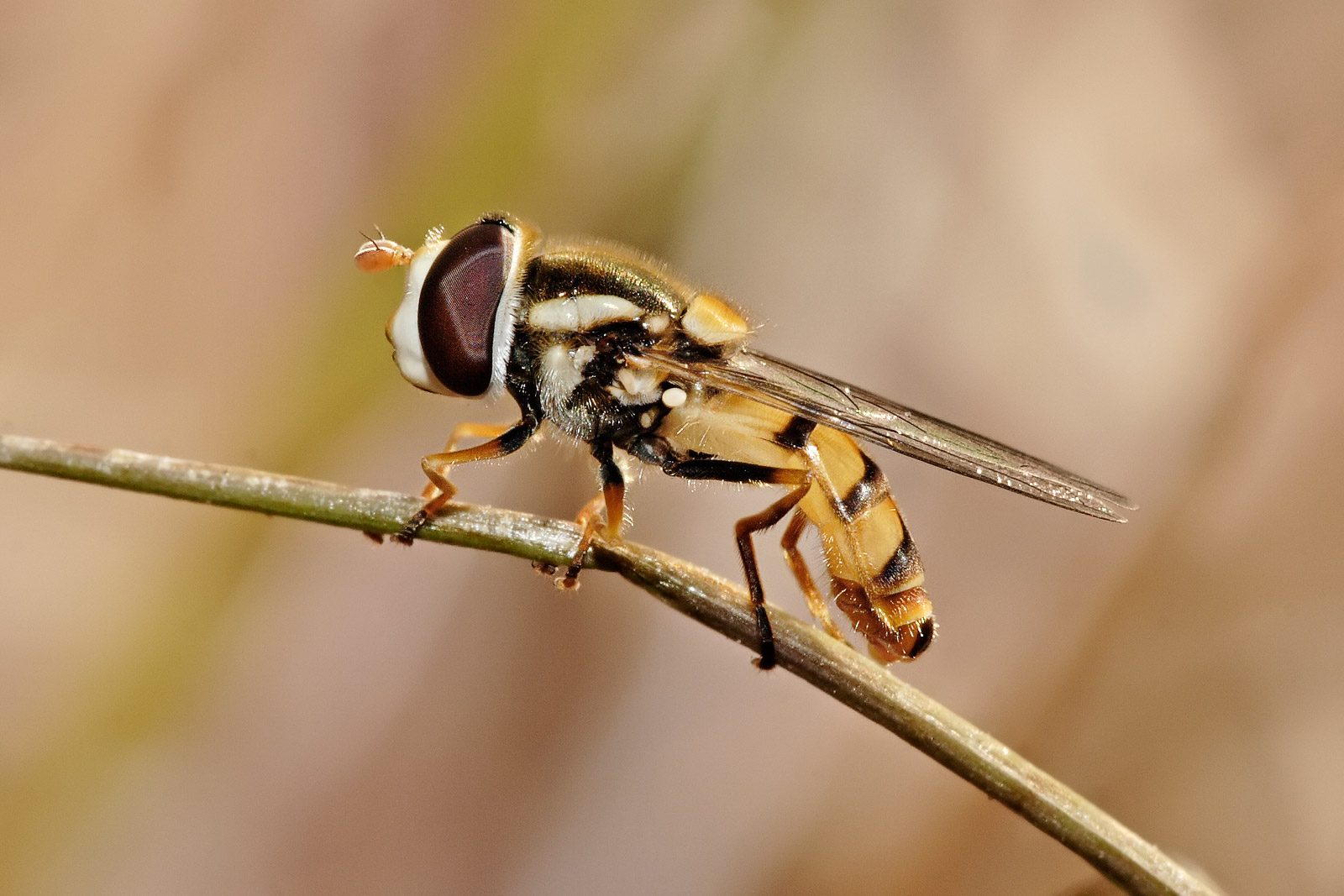
- Simosyrphus grandicornis

Scientific classification
- Kingdom: Animalia
- Phylum: Arthropoda
- Class: Insecta
- Order: Diptera
- Family: Syrphidae
- Tribe: Syrphini
- Genus: Simosyrphus; Bigot, 1882

= Simosyrphus =

Genus of flies

Simosyrphus is a genus of hoverfly.

== Included species (2) ==
- S. aegyptius (Wiedemann, 1830)
- S. grandicornis (Macquart, 1842)

S. scutellaris was previously an accepted species, but is now considered a synonym of Ischiodon scutellaris.
