= Melangyna damastor =

Scientific classification
- Kingdom: Animalia
- Phylum: Arthropoda
- Class: Insecta
- Order: Diptera
- Family: Syrphidae
- Genus: Melangyna
- Species: M. damastor

Binomial name
- Melangyna damastor Walker, 1849

Species of hover fly

Melangyna damastor is a species of hover fly. It is found mainly on the west and east coasts of Australia.
