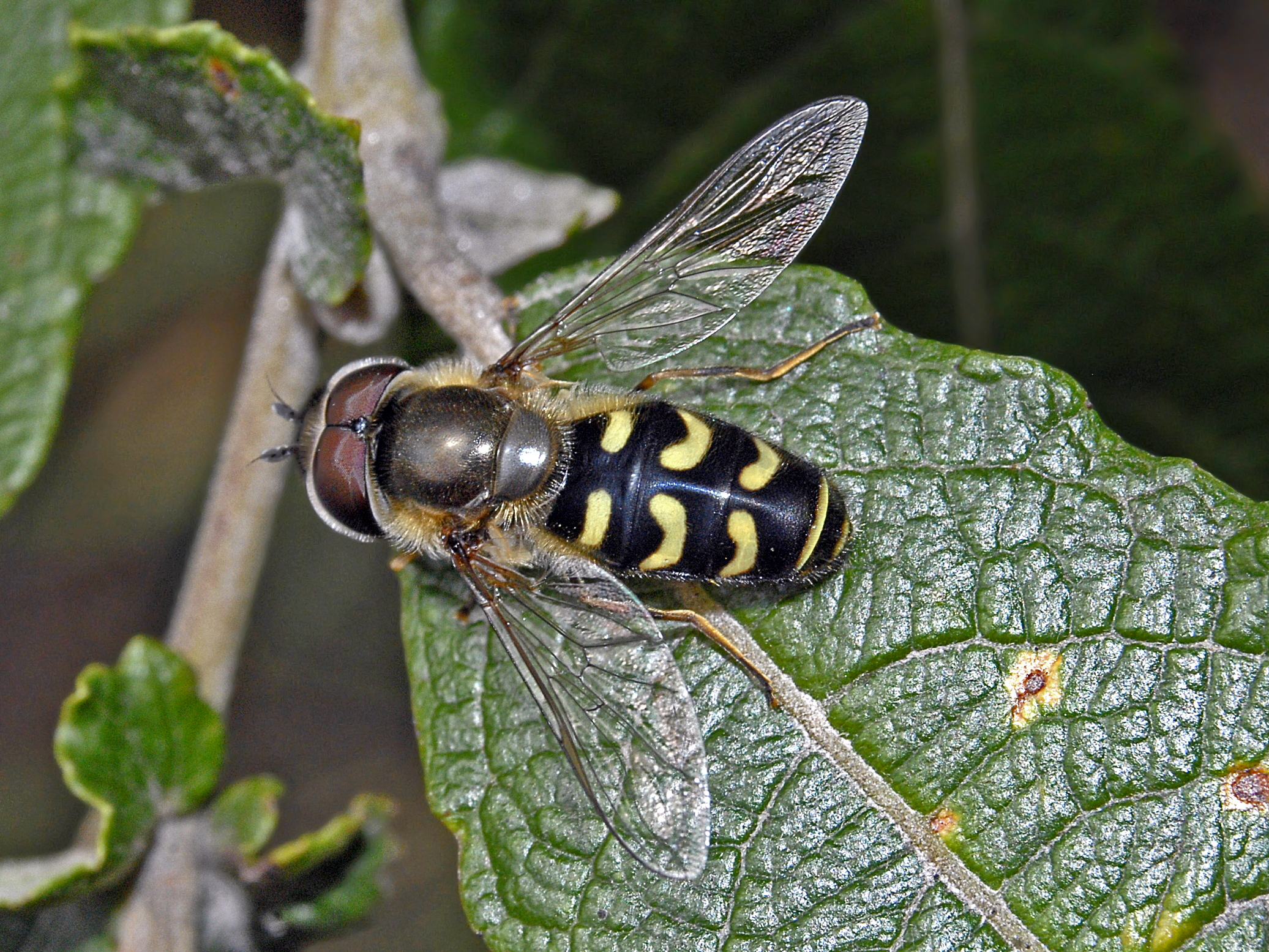
- Male
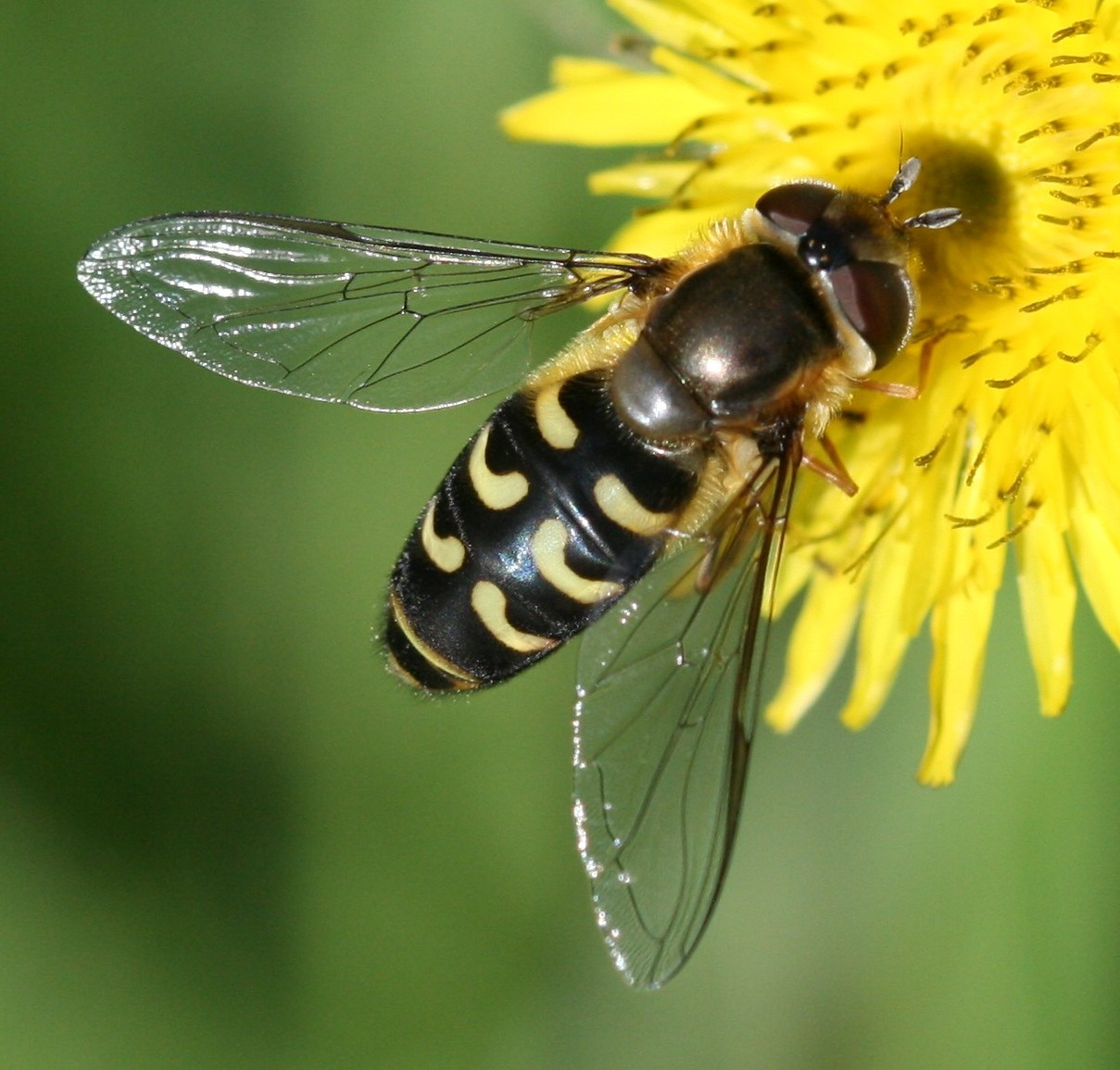
- Female

Scientific classification
- Kingdom: Animalia
- Phylum: Arthropoda
- Class: Insecta
- Order: Diptera
- Family: Syrphidae
- Genus: Scaeva
- Species: S. selenitica

Binomial name
- Scaeva selenitica (Meigen, 1822)

Synonyms
- Syrphus seleniticus Meigen, 1822

= Scaeva selenitica =

Species of fly

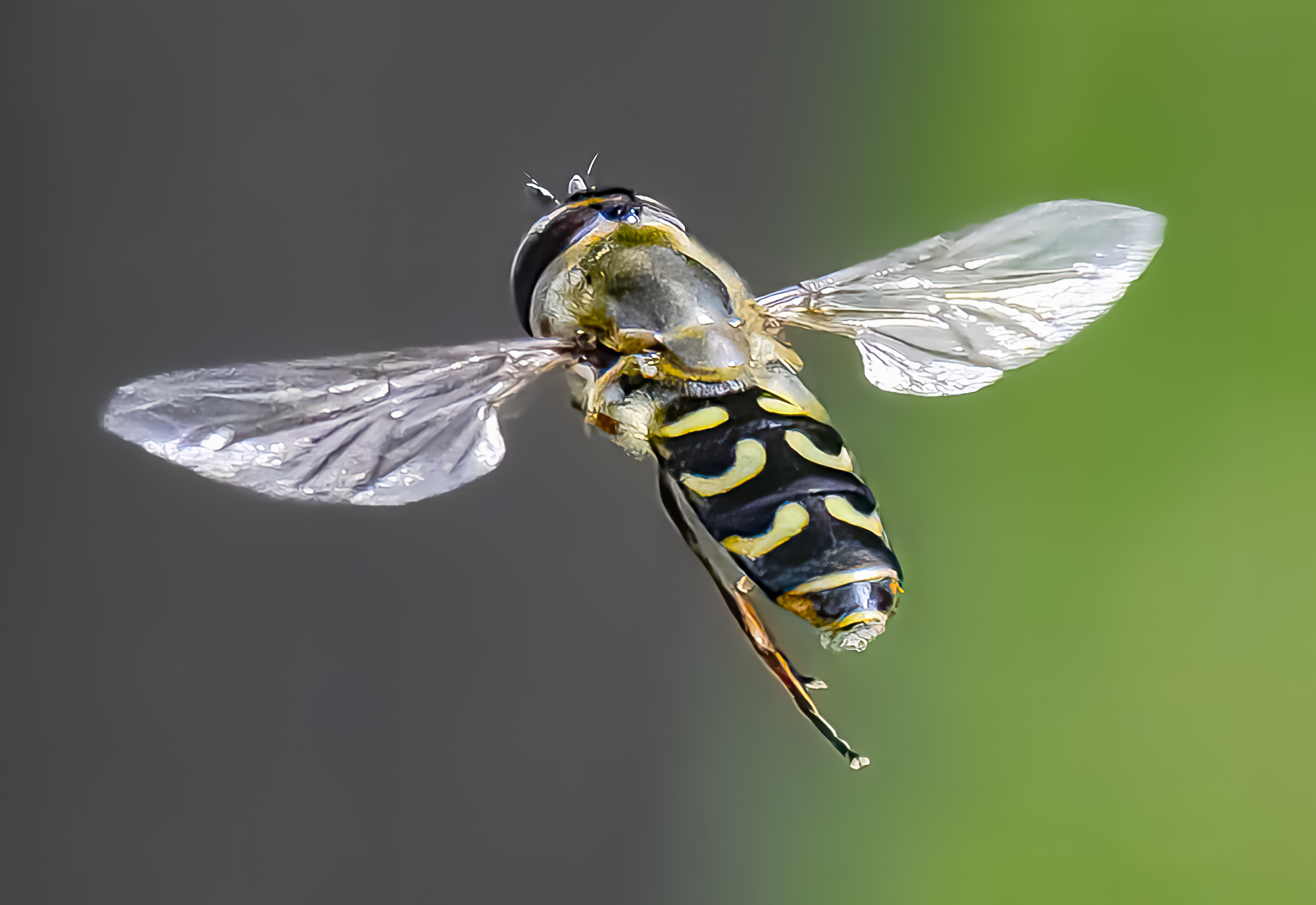

Scaeva selenitica is a species of hoverfly.

== Description ==
Scaeva selenitica can reach a length of 12–15 millimetres (0.47–0.59 in), with a wing length of 10.5–12 millimetres (0.41–0.47 in). These large distinctive hoverflies have sparse, fine light hair. Thorax is shiny black, scutellum is yellowish-green and the abdomen is dark black, The legs are light brown-yellow in the middle, while femurs and feet are darker. The abdomen shows three pairs of yellow comma markings (lunules). This species is similar to Scaeva pyrastri but differs in that the abdomen markings are larger and yellow, while in Scaeva pyrastri they are white.

== Biology ==
Adults are common visitors to flowers. They mainly feed on nectar and pollen of various Asteraceae, on Crataegus species, Heracleum sphondylium, Rumex acetosa, Rumex obtusifolius, Stellaria holostea, Salix caprea and Salix cinerea. The larvae feed on aphids.

== Distribution and habitat ==
This species is present in most of Europe, in the eastern Palearctic realm, in the Near East, and in North Africa. These hoverflies can be found in meadows and in hedge rows.
