= Melangyna ericarum =

Scientific classification
- Kingdom: Animalia
- Phylum: Arthropoda
- Class: Insecta
- Order: Diptera
- Family: Syrphidae
- Genus: Melangyna
- Species: M. ericarum

Binomial name
- Melangyna ericarum (Collin, 1946)

Synonyms

Species of fly

Melangyna ericarum is a European species of hoverfly.
