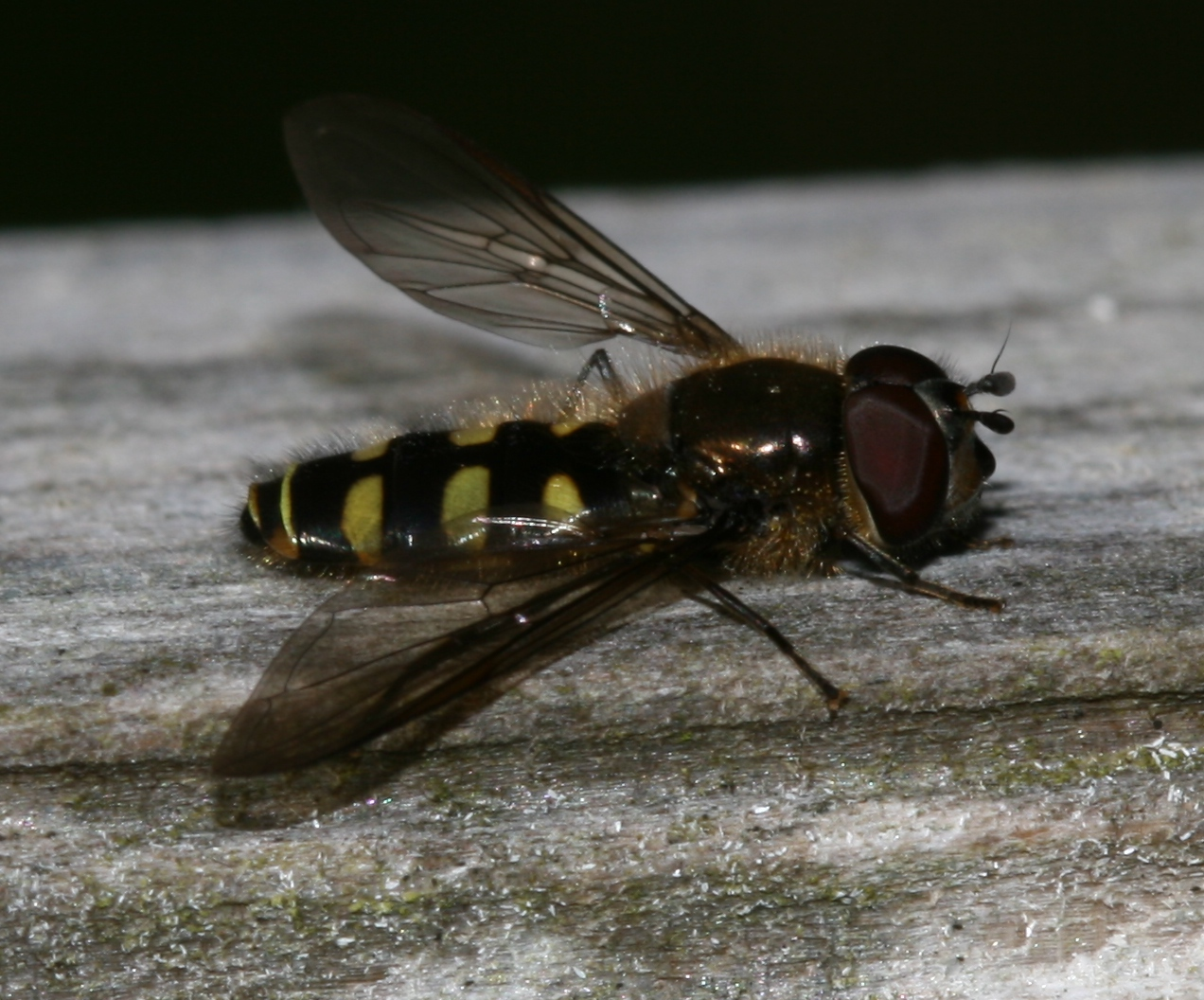
- male
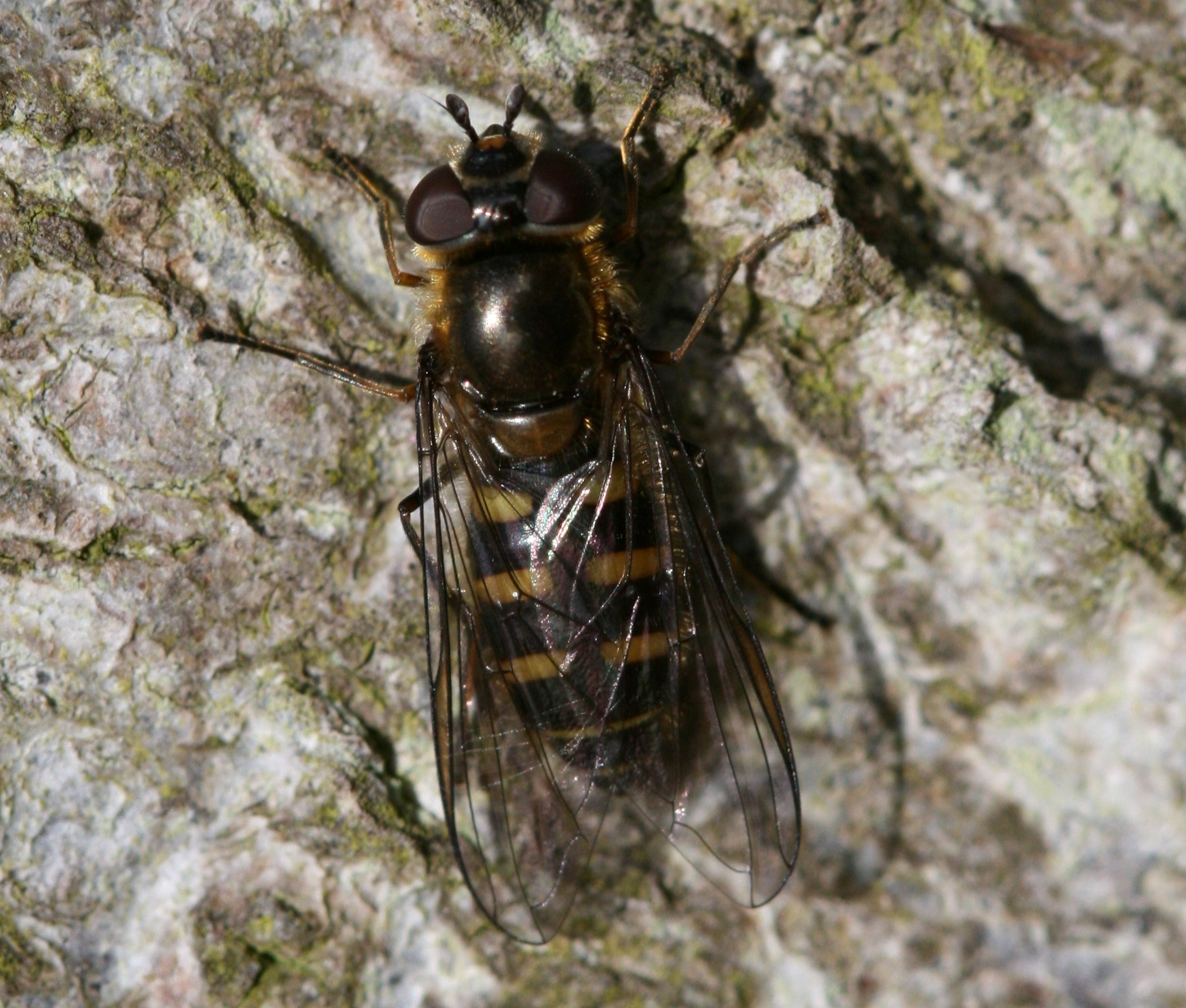
- female

Scientific classification
- Kingdom: Animalia
- Phylum: Arthropoda
- Class: Insecta
- Order: Diptera
- Family: Syrphidae
- Genus: Melangyna
- Species: M. lasiophthalma

Binomial name
- Melangyna lasiophthalma (Zetterstedt, 1843)

= Melangyna lasiophthalma =

Species of fly

Melangyna lasiophthalma is a Holarctic species of hoverfly.

== Description ==
External images For terms see Morphology of Diptera
Wing length 7-9·25 mm. Facial prominence projecting well beyond frontal prominence. Post-orbital strip wide. scutellar hairs mostly yellow towards anterior margin. Long hairs on general body surface black and brownish-yellow. The male terminalia are figured by Hippa (1968) ). Larva described and figured by Goeldlin (1974) and in colour by Rotheray (1994). See references for determination.

== Distribution ==
Palearctic from Iceland and Fennoscandia South to the Pyrenees and mountains of Spain. Ireland East through North Europe and mountainous parts of Central Europe. East into European Russia and Siberia. Nearctic from Alaska south to Colorado and Maryland.

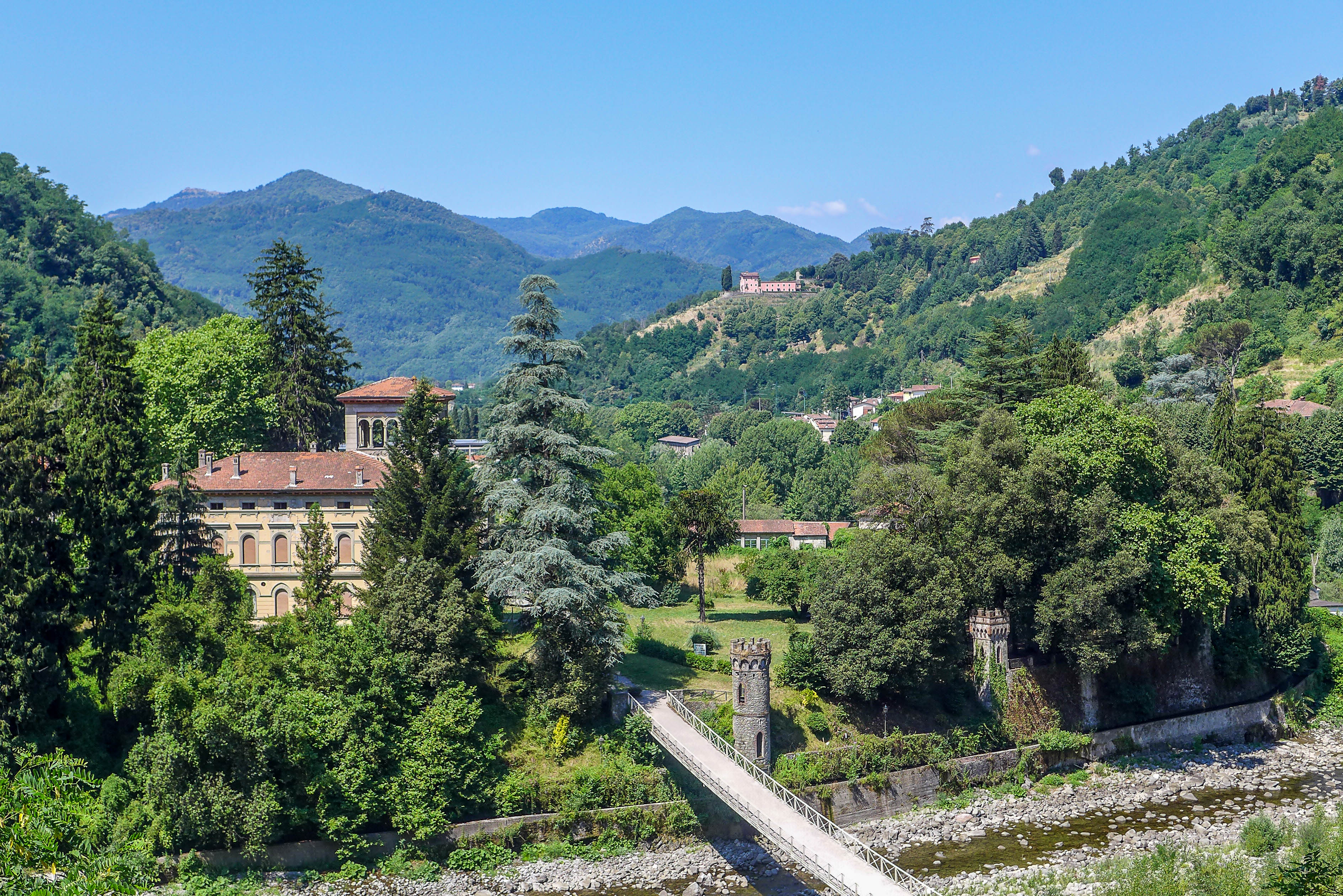
Habitat in Italy

== Biology ==
Habitat: Quercus forest, Fraxinus and Salix gallery woods along rivers, Alnus, Salix, Betula forests, Abies and Picea forest, Atlantic scrub, hedgerows, suburban gardens, parks and orchards. Flowers visited include Acer pseudoplatanus, Alnus glutinosa, Anemone nemorosa, Anthriscus, Caltha, Chrysosplenium oppositifolium, Corylus avellana, Euphorbia, Ilex, Lonicera xylosteum, Narcissus, Oxalis, Prunus laurocerasus, Prunus spinosa, Ranunculus, Salix, Sambucus, Sorbus aucuparia, Taraxacum, Tussilago, Ulex. The flight period is March to June (later at higher altitudes and more northerly latitudes.
