= Scaeva albomaculata =

- dorsal view of a male

Scientific classification
- Kingdom: Animalia
- Phylum: Arthropoda
- Clade: Pancrustacea
- Class: Insecta
- Order: Diptera
- Family: Syrphidae
- Genus: Scaeva
- Species: S. albomaculata

Binomial name
- Scaeva albomaculata (Macquart, 1842)

Synonyms
- Syrphus seleniticus Macquart, 1842

Species of fly

Scaeva albomaculata is a European species of hoverfly.
