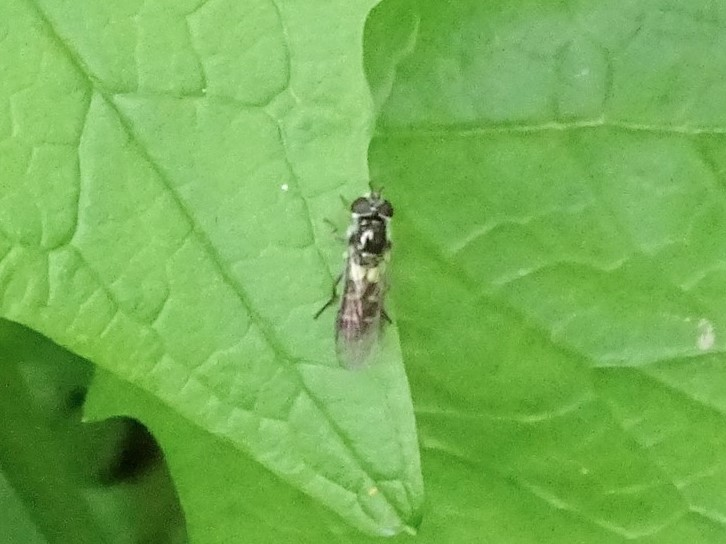

Scientific classification
- Kingdom: Animalia
- Phylum: Arthropoda
- Class: Insecta
- Order: Diptera
- Family: Syrphidae
- Tribe: Syrphini
- Genus: Melangyna
- Species: M. fisherii

Binomial name
- Melangyna fisherii (Walton, 1911)

Synonyms
- Stenosyrphus diversipunctatus Curran, 1925; Syrphus fisherii Walton, 1911

= Melangyna fisherii =

Species of fly

Melangyna fisherii, the large-spotted halfband, is a species of syrphid fly in the family Syrphidae. It is found in nearctic North America
