= Scaeva mecogramma =

Scientific classification
- Kingdom: Animalia
- Phylum: Arthropoda
- Class: Insecta
- Order: Diptera
- Family: Syrphidae
- Genus: Scaeva
- Species: S. mecogramma

Binomial name
- Scaeva mecogramma (Bigot, 1860)

Synonyms
- Lasiophthicus seleniticus Bigot, 1860

Species of fly

Scaeva mecogramma is a European species of hoverfly.
