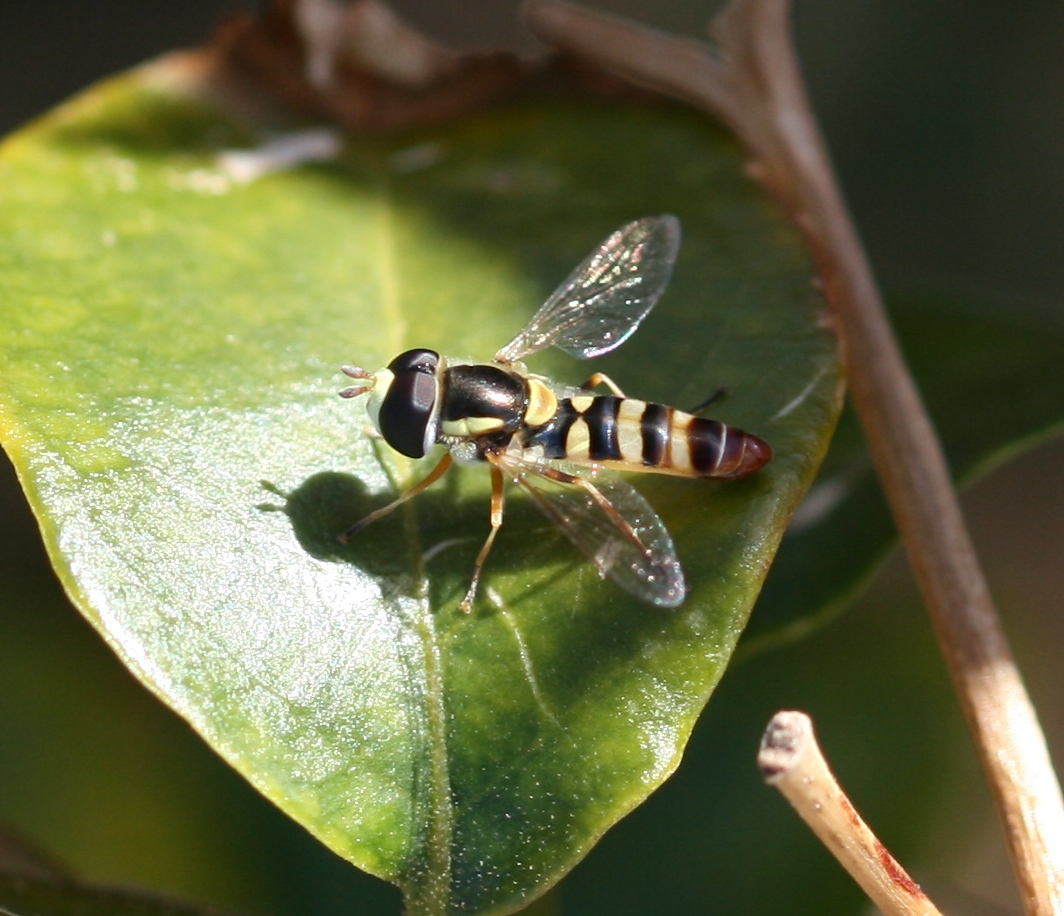
- A male Ischiodon aegyptius on a leaf. "Epaulette" markings are seen on the thorax

Conservation status
- Least Concern (IUCN 3.1)

Scientific classification
- Kingdom: Animalia
- Phylum: Arthropoda
- Class: Insecta
- Order: Diptera
- Family: Syrphidae
- Genus: Ischiodon
- Species: I. aegyptius

Binomial name
- Ischiodon aegyptius (Wiedemann, 1830)

Synonyms
- Syrphus aegyptius Wiedemann, 1830

= Ischiodon aegyptius =

Species of fly

Ischiodon aegyptius, the epauletted hoverfly, is a species of fly which is known to inhabit the Afrotropical realm.

The adults are pollinators and hover among many flowers, whilst the larvae are green and featureless, feeding on aphids. The fly resembles a small wasp, and is a very powerful flier.
