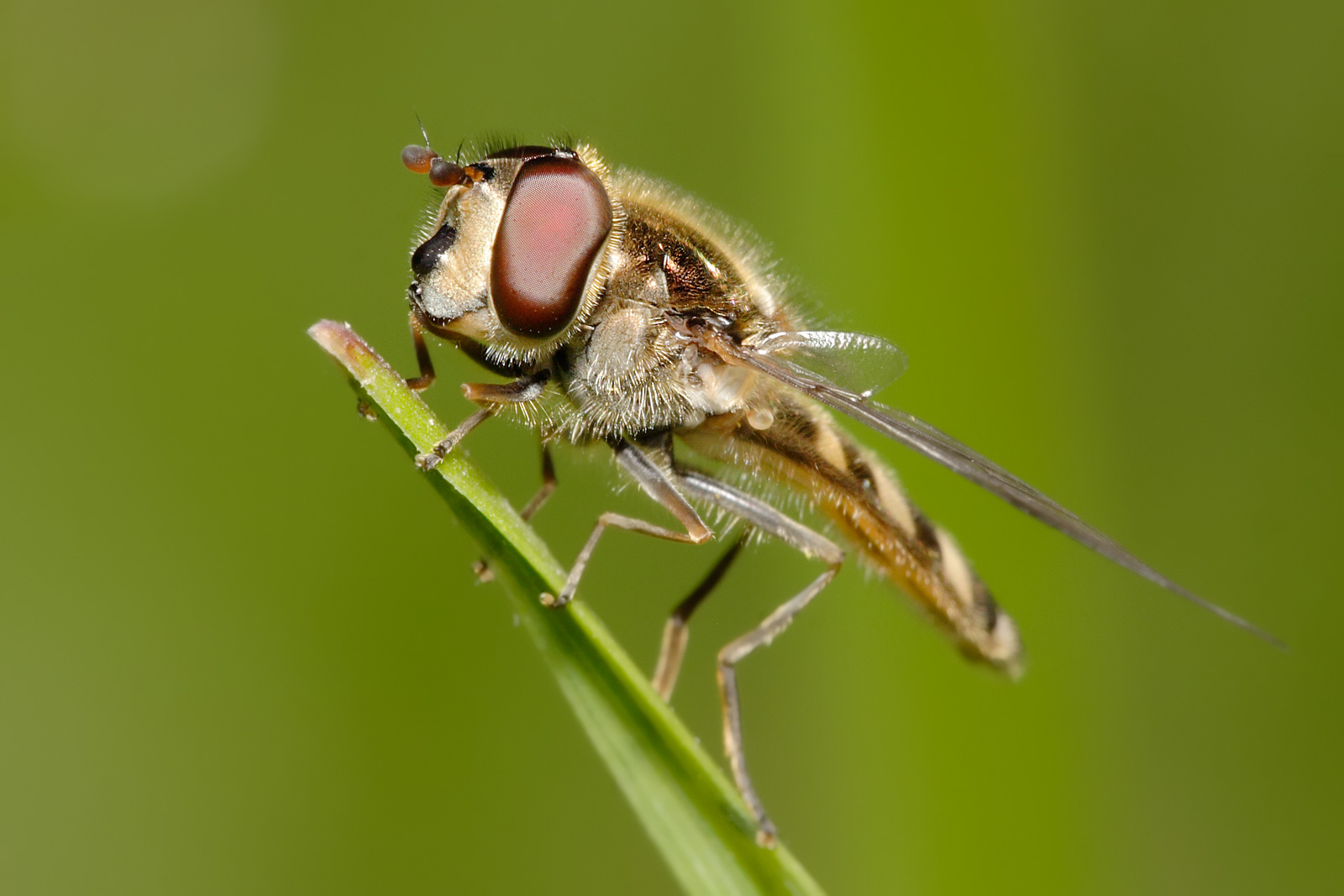

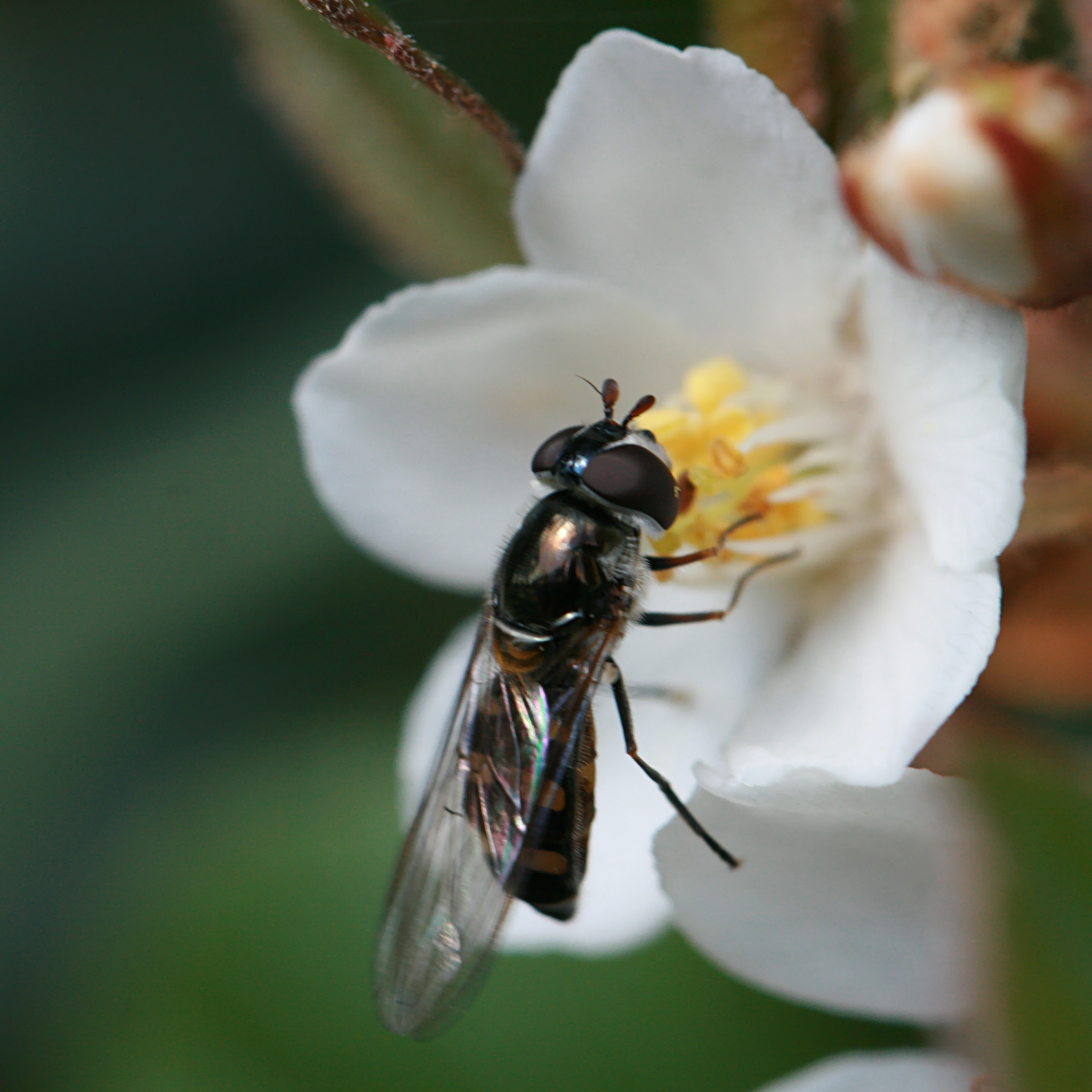

Scientific classification
- Kingdom: Animalia
- Phylum: Arthropoda
- Clade: Pancrustacea
- Class: Insecta
- Order: Diptera
- Family: Syrphidae
- Genus: Melangyna
- Species: M. viridiceps

Binomial name
- Melangyna viridiceps (Macquart, 1847)

= Melangyna viridiceps =

Species of fly

Melangyna viridiceps is an Australian hoverfly, known as the common hover fly.

== Description ==
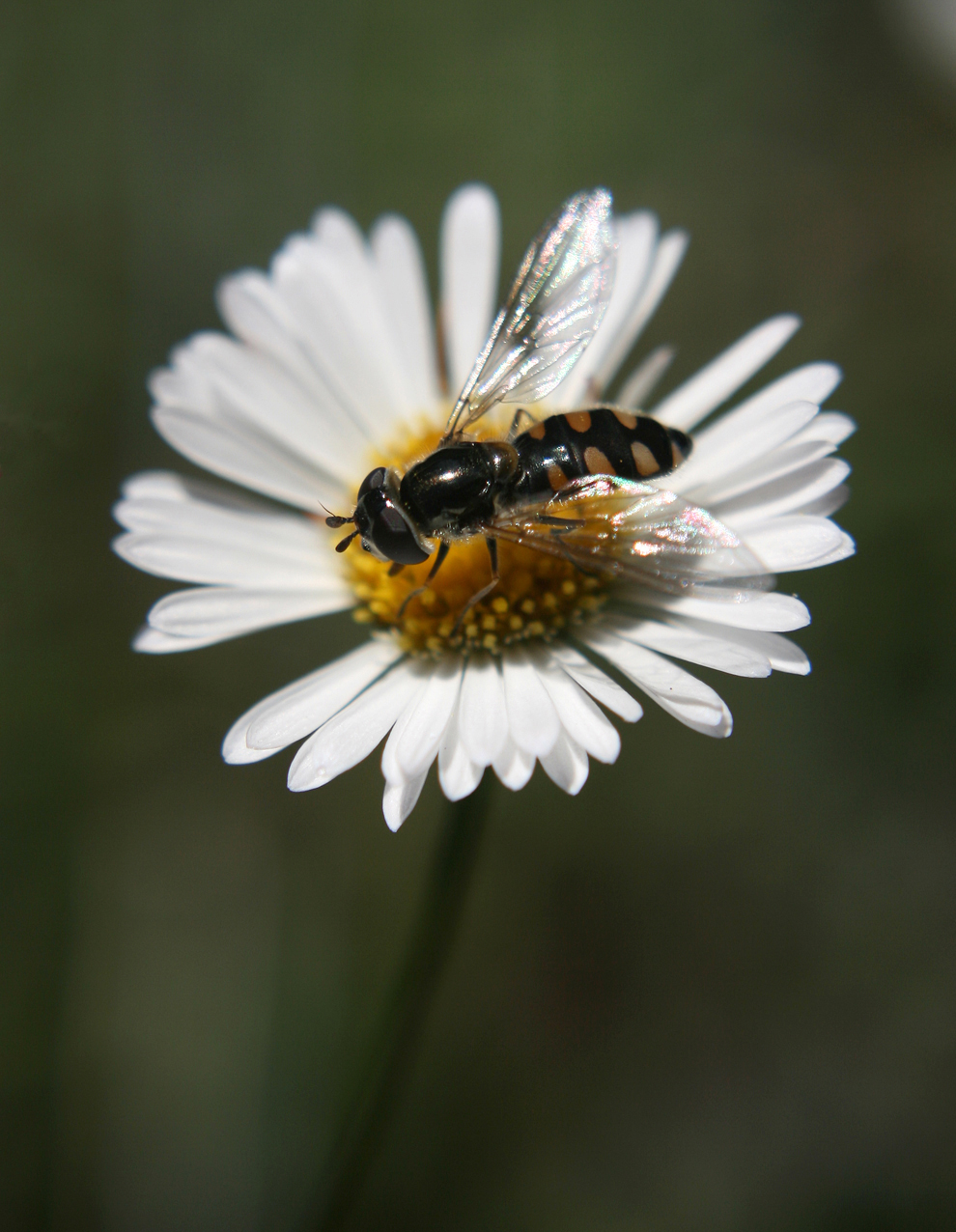
Pollinating a flower

It is one of the two most common hoverflies in Australia, alongside Simosyrphus grandicornis, with which it has often been confused, but can be distinguished by its all black thorax.

M. viridiceps has a body up to 1 cm in length.

== Feeding ==
The adult flies feed on pollen and nectar which they gather from flowers, while the larvae feed on aphids.

== Distribution ==
It is found widely across Eastern Australia.

Some sources indicate that the species is also present in New Zealand, either on the Kermadec Islands only, or on both the Kermadecs and the mainland. Most recent sources, however, do not record this species as being present outside of Australia. Miller's 1921 mention for the Kermadec was found to be a misidentification for Simosyrphus grandicornis, and Macfarlane et al. failed to cite specimens or published reports for their claim of the species' presence in the Kermadec.
