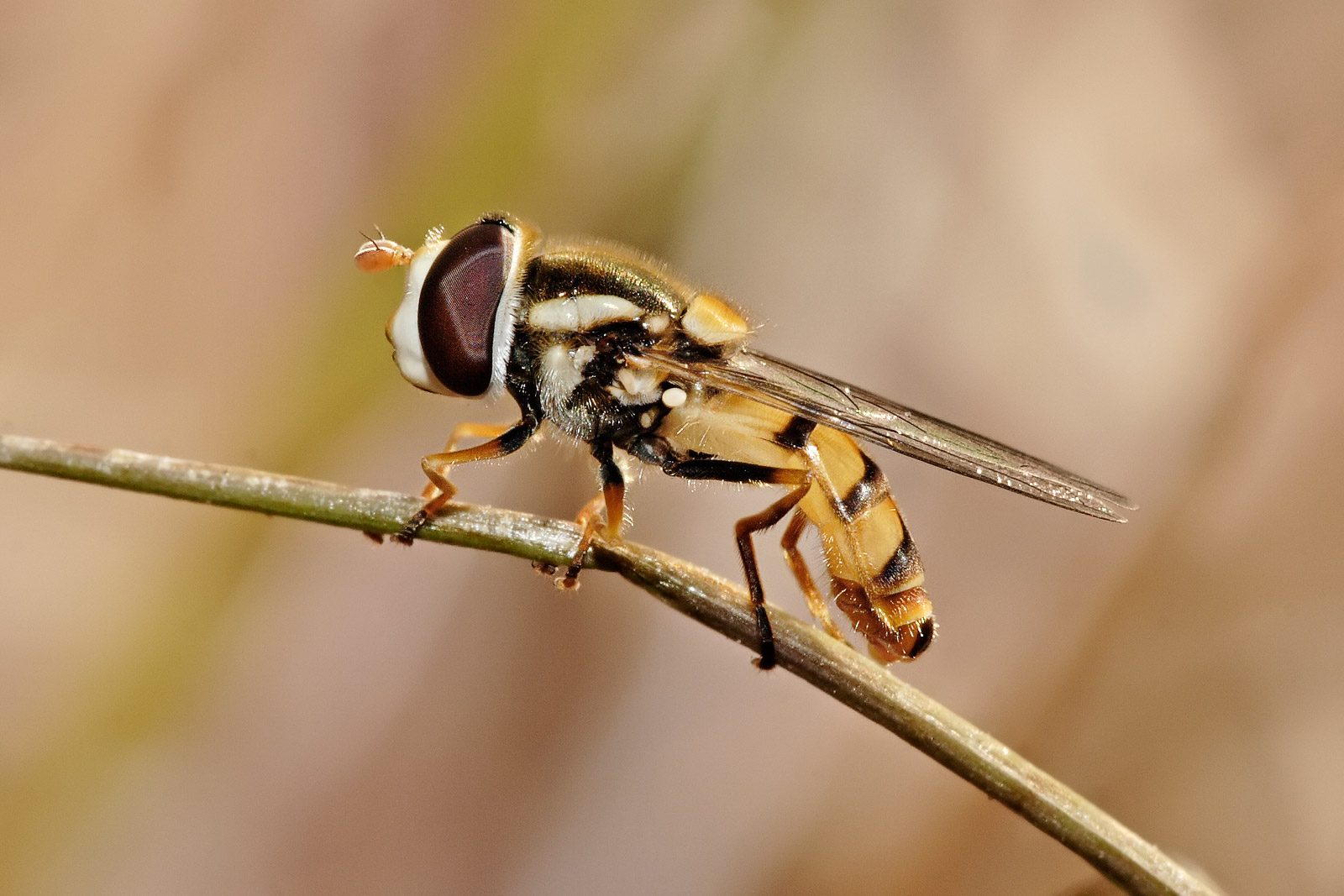

Scientific classification
- Kingdom: Animalia
- Phylum: Arthropoda
- Clade: Pancrustacea
- Class: Insecta
- Order: Diptera
- Family: Syrphidae
- Genus: Simosyrphus
- Species: S. grandicornis

Binomial name
- Simosyrphus grandicornis (Macquart, 1842)

Synonyms
- Metasyrphus fasciatus Shiraki, 1963; Syrphus australiensis Goot, 1964; Syrphus corollae vitiensis Bezzi, 1928; Syrphus grandicornis Macquart, 1842; Syrphus huttoni Goot, 1964; Syrphus melanurus Bigot, 1884; Syrphus obesus Hutton, 1901; Syrphus pusillus Macquart, 1847; Syrphus sydneyensis Macquart, 1846

= Simosyrphus grandicornis =

Species of fly

Simosyrphus grandicornis, commonly known as the yellow-shouldered stout hoverfly, is an Australasian species of hoverfly, and is one of the two most common hoverflies in Australia, alongside Melangyna viridiceps. It has been introduced to a number of Polynesian Islands as well as Hawaii.

Eggs are laid near aphid colonies, as the prey of this species' larvae is mainly aphids.

== Description ==
S. grandicornis has a body length of ten mm. It has yellow edges on the sides of the thorax and yellow antennae. It is named for its stout body shape. The easiest way to differentiate the sexes is that females have their eyes separated at the top, whilst males have them touching. Females also have a slightly wider and rounder abdomen.

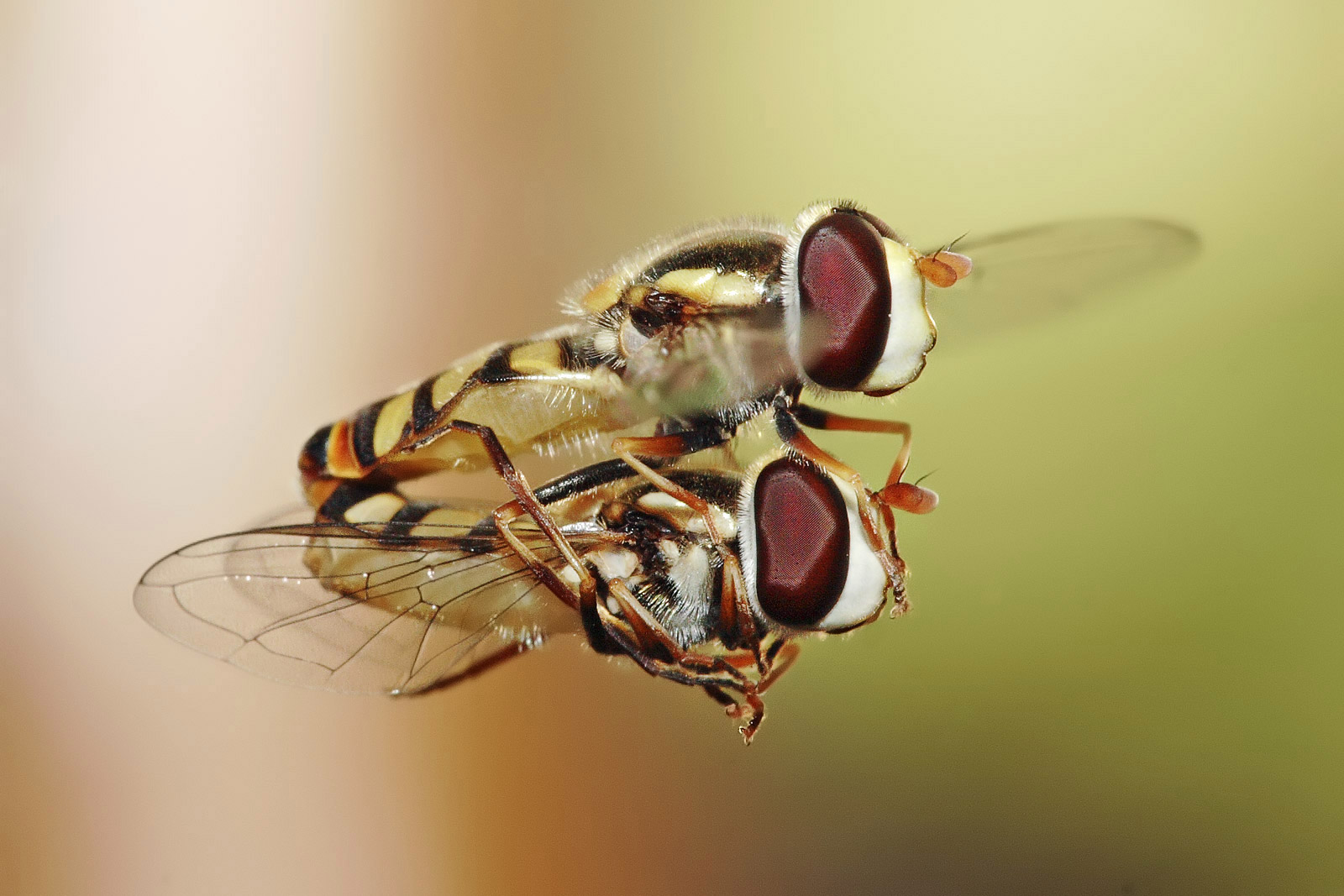
Midair mating of S. grandicornis
