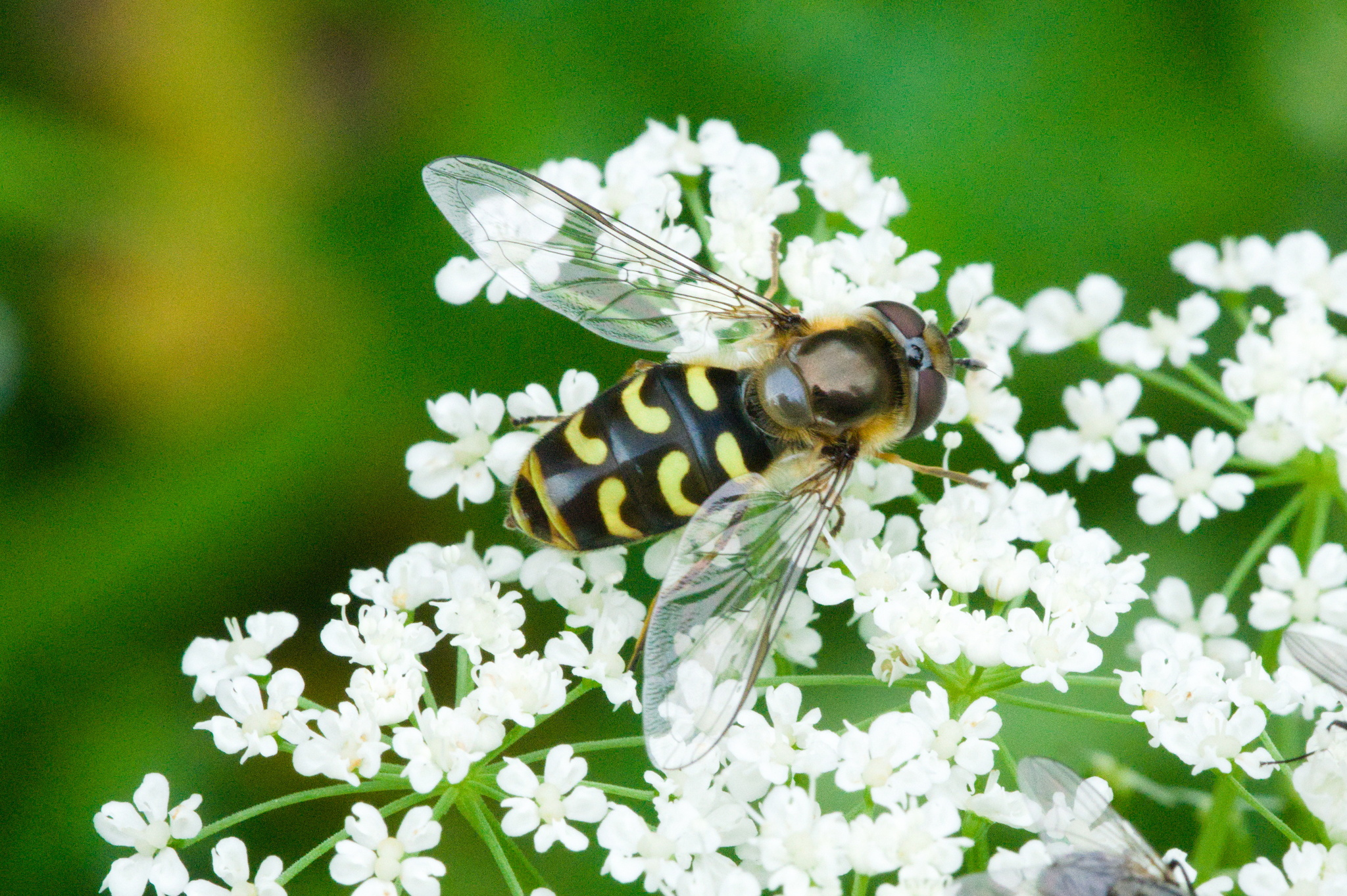

Scientific classification
- Kingdom: Animalia
- Phylum: Arthropoda
- Class: Insecta
- Order: Diptera
- Family: Syrphidae
- Genus: Scaeva
- Species: S. dignota

Binomial name
- Scaeva dignota (Rondani, 1857)

Synonyms
- Syrphus seleniticus Rondani, 1857

= Scaeva dignota =

Species of fly

Scaeva dignota is a European species of hoverfly.
