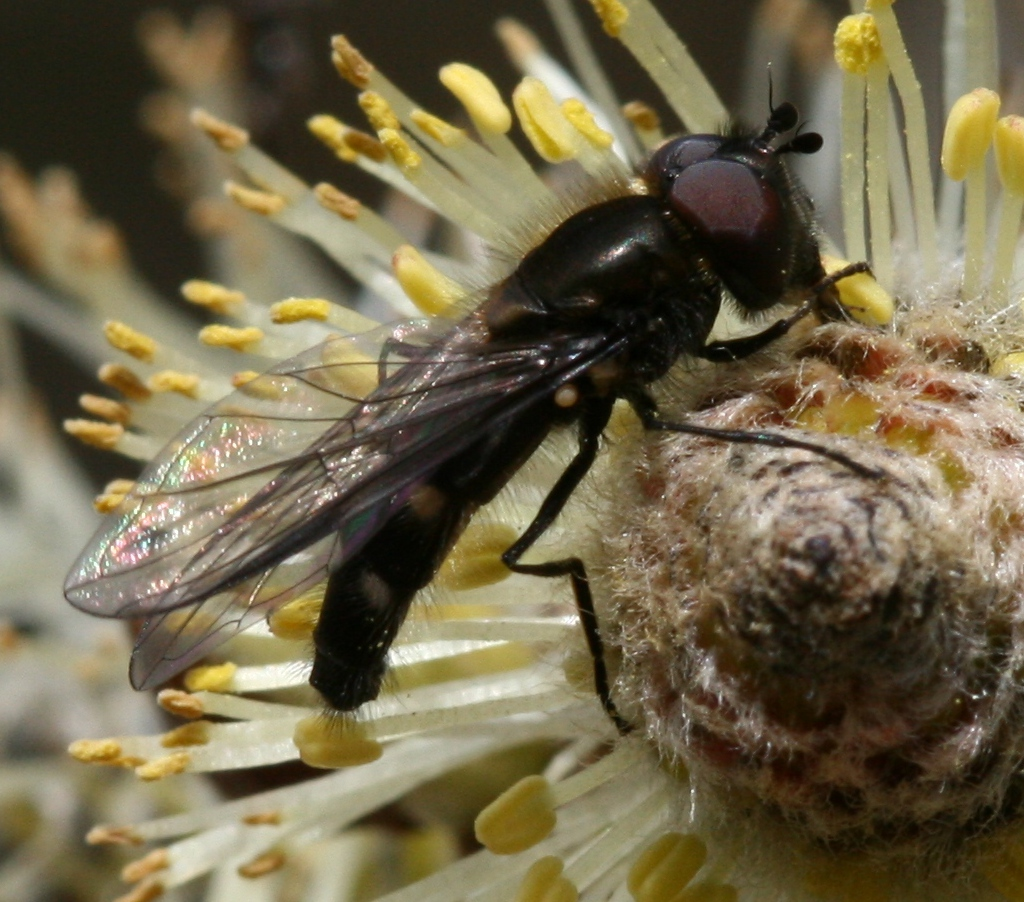
- male
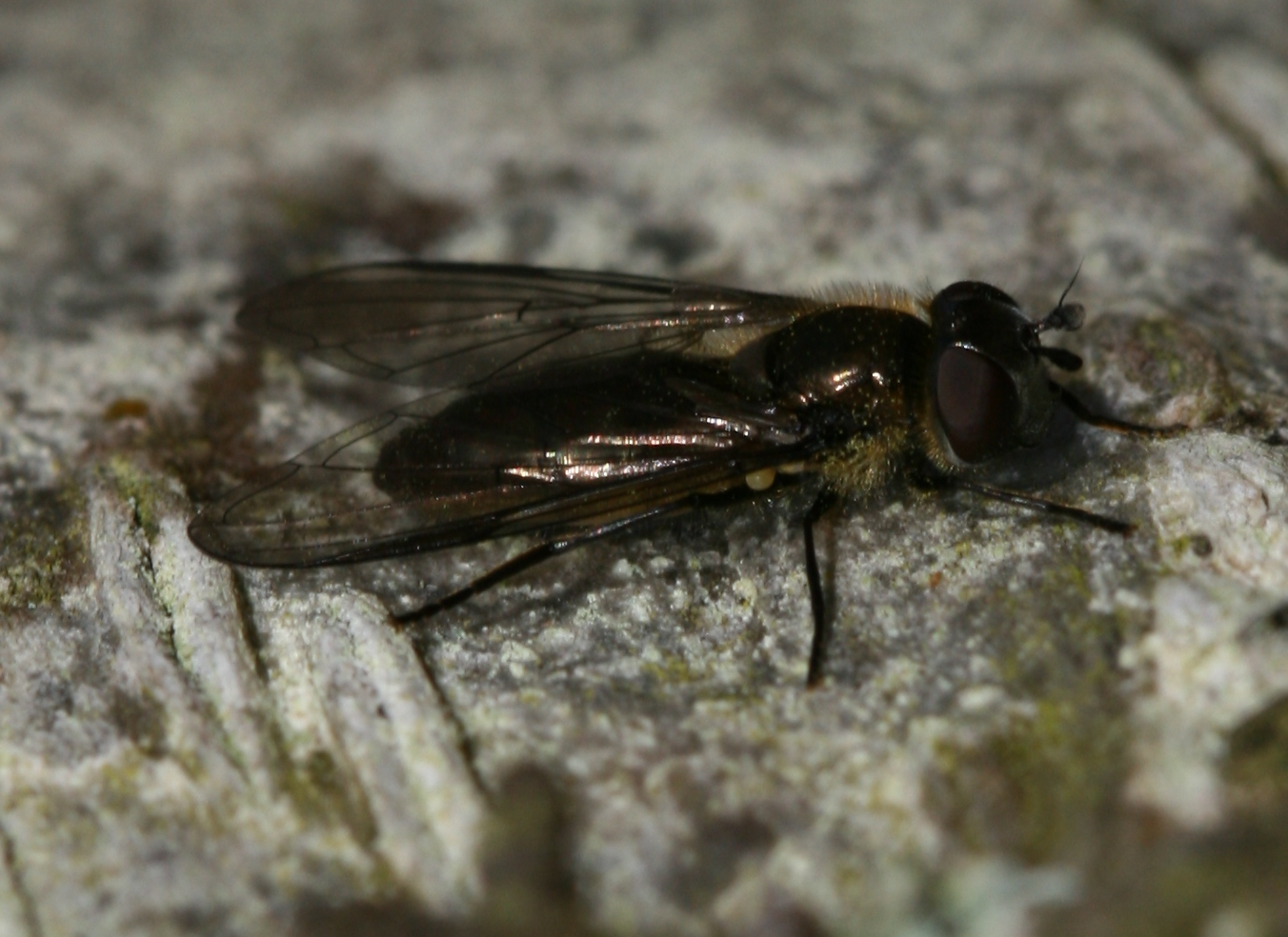
- female

Scientific classification
- Kingdom: Animalia
- Phylum: Arthropoda
- Class: Insecta
- Order: Diptera
- Family: Syrphidae
- Genus: Melangyna
- Species: M. quadrimaculata

Binomial name
- Melangyna quadrimaculata (Verrall, 1873)

Synonyms

= Melangyna quadrimaculata =

Species of fly

Melangyna quadrimaculata is a European species of hoverfly.

== Description ==
External images For terms see Morphology of Diptera
Wing length 7·25–9 mm. Males only four spots on the abdomen. Female tergites black, pale abdominal markings absent. Eyes with short hairs. The male terminalia are figured by Hippa (1968) ). Larva described and figured by Rotheray (1994). See references for determination.

== Distribution ==
Palearctic Southern Norway, Sweden, Finland and Denmark South to Belgium. Ireland East through Central Europe into European Russia and on to the Russian Far East, Siberia and the Pacific coast (Sakhalin).

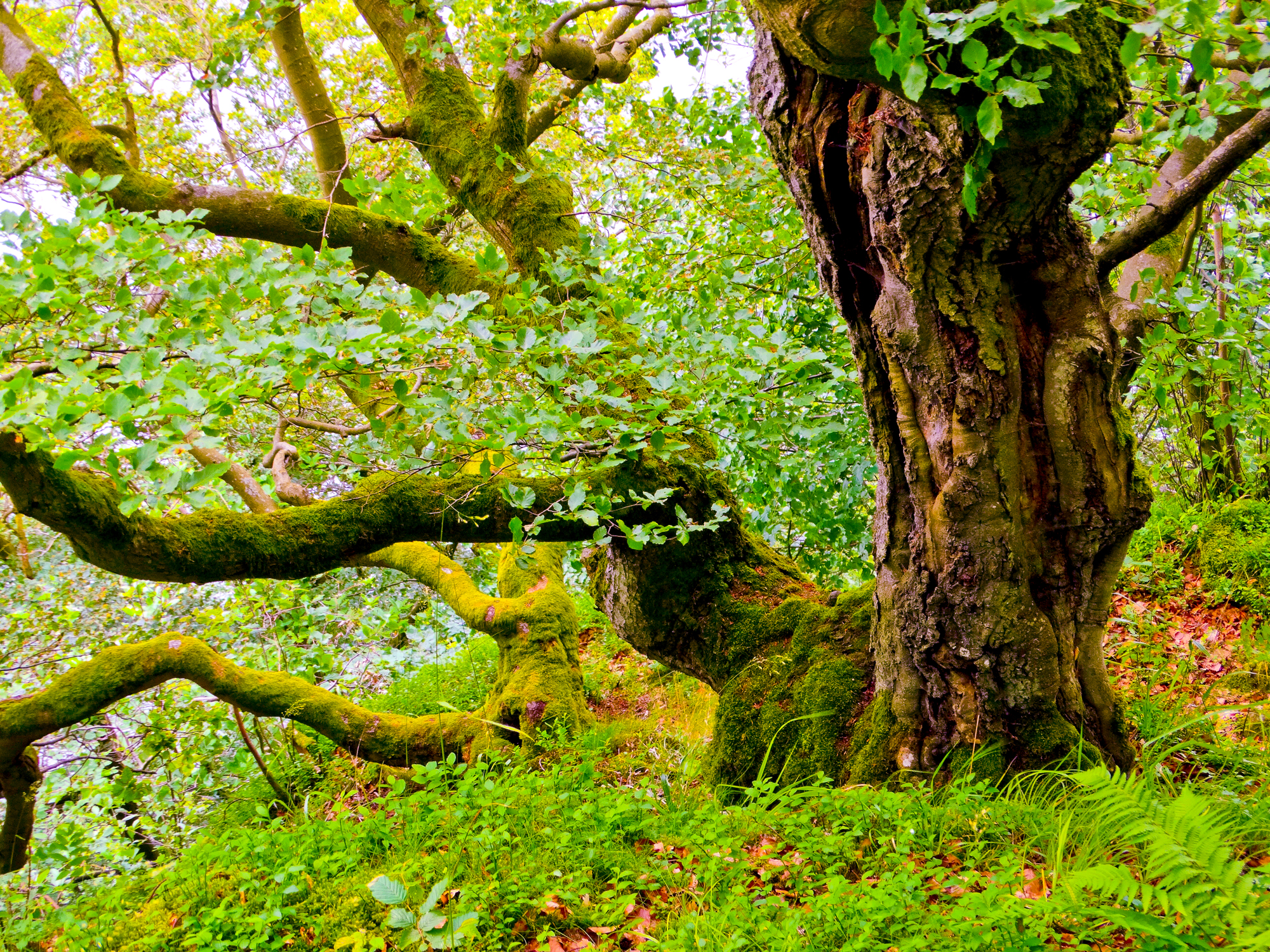
Habitat.Kellerwald, Germany

== Biology ==
Habitat Fagus and Quercus ancient woodlands, also in extensive parks in with overmature trees. Arboreal, but descends to visit flowers of Alnus, Anemone nemorosa, Carpinus, Chrysosplenium oppositifolium, Corylus, Hamamelis mollis, Lonicera xylosteum, Populus tremula, Salix, Sambucus, Tussilago. The flight period is end February to end April. The larvae are predacious on adelgids on firs.
