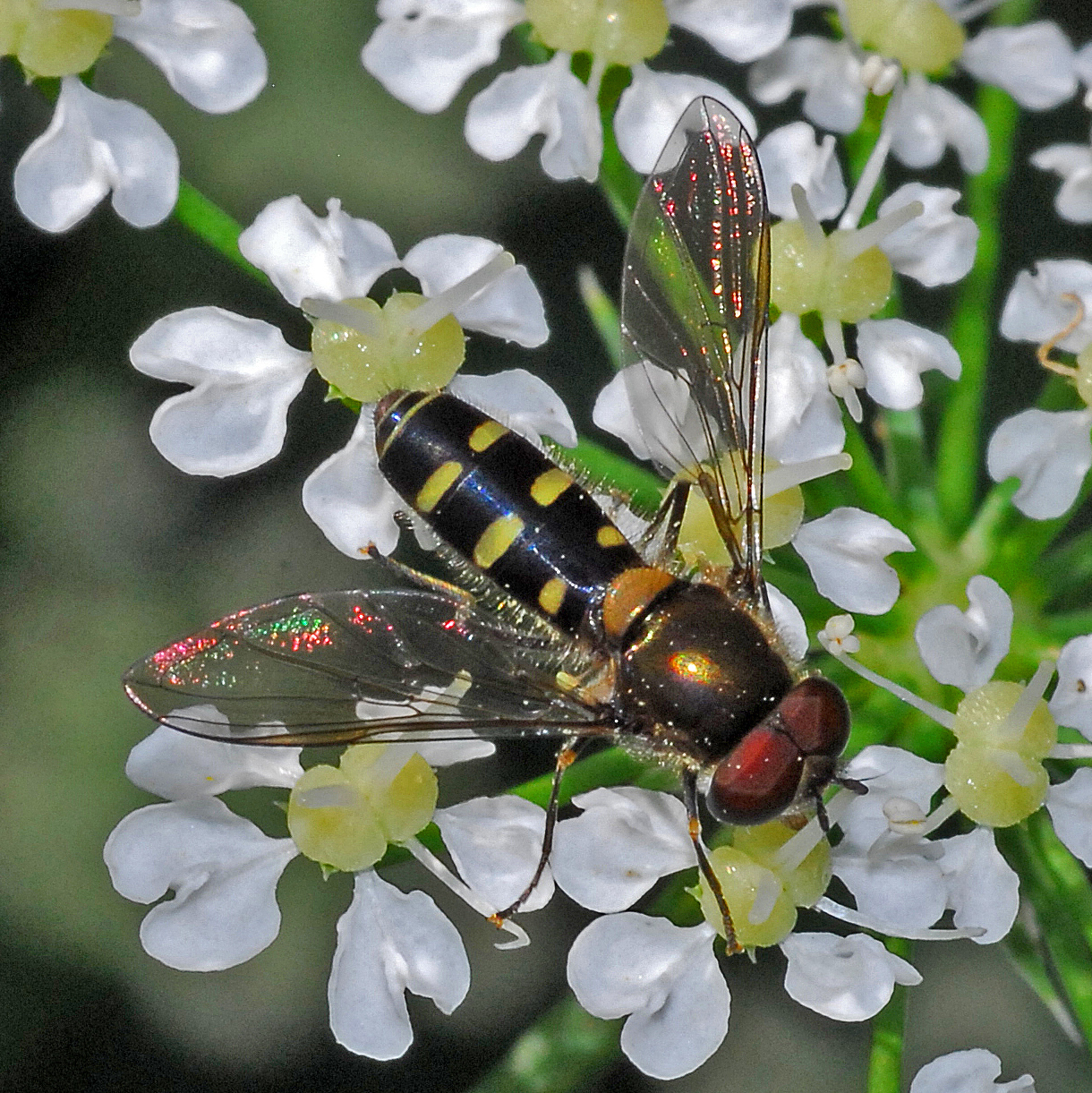
- Melangyna umbellatarum. Male
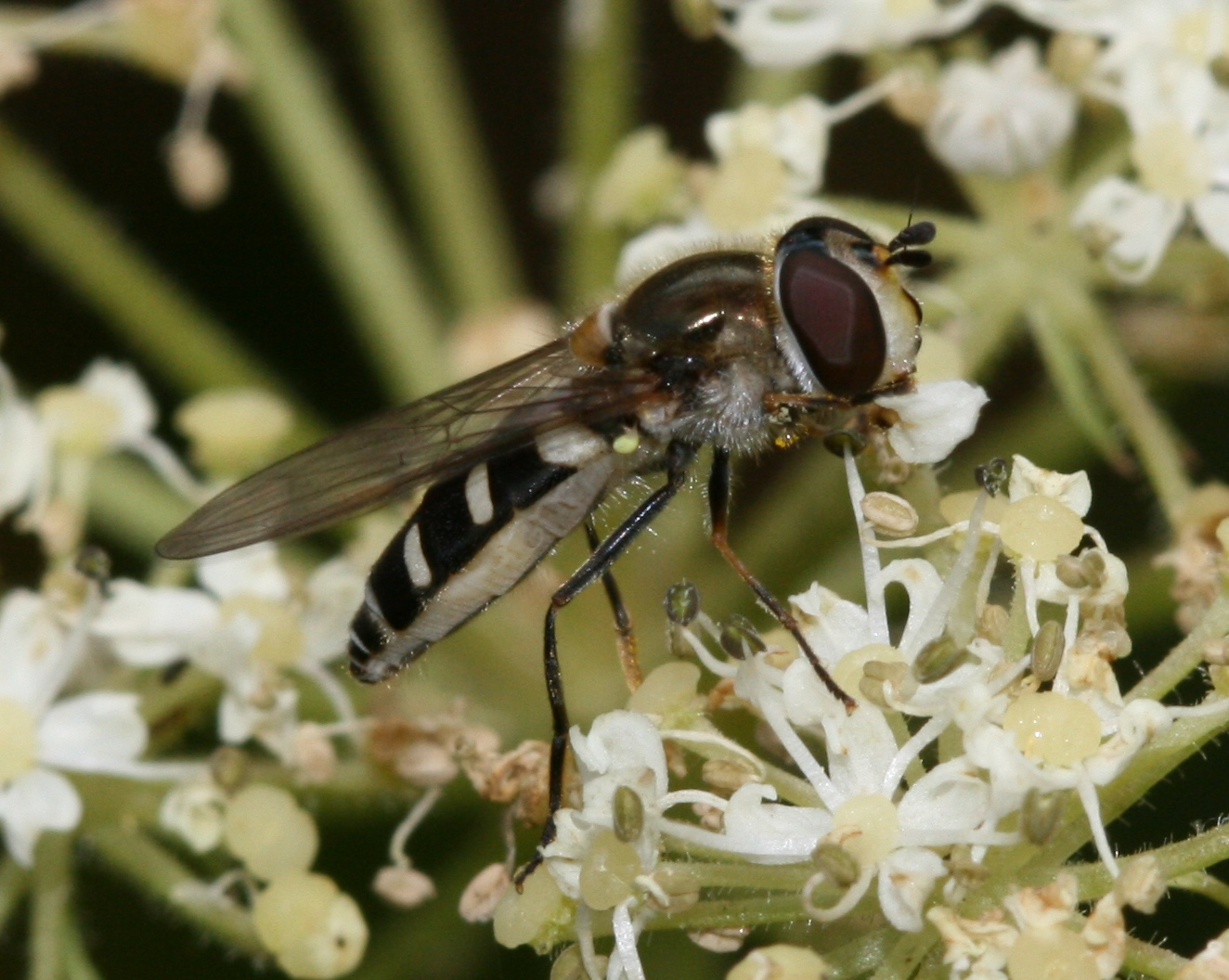
- Female, side view

Scientific classification
- Kingdom: Animalia
- Phylum: Arthropoda
- Class: Insecta
- Order: Diptera
- Family: Syrphidae
- Genus: Melangyna
- Species: M. umbellatarum

Binomial name
- Melangyna umbellatarum (Fabricius, 1794)

Synonyms

= Melangyna umbellatarum =

Species of fly

Melangyna umbellatarum is a Holarctic species of hoverfly.

== Description ==
External images For terms, see: Morphology of Diptera.

Wing length: 6.5–8.75 mm (0.256–0.344 in). This species closely resembles Melangyna ericarum, but the thorax has pale hairs on the disc (many black hairs in M. ericarum). The jowls have only pale hairs below the eyes, whereas M. ericarum has some black hairs. Tergite 2 has moderately large, yellow side-spots which extend close to or over the side-margins of the tergite (they are widely set back from it in M. ericarum). The legs have distinct clear orange markings (obscure in M. ericarum), and the four anterior femora have few or none of the posterior black bristles present in M. ericarum. For full characters and references, see Bartsch et al. and Bei-Bienko, G.Y. & Steyskal, G.C. The male terminalia are figured by Hippa.

== Distribution ==
Palearctic: Fennoscandia south to Iberia, Ireland east through North Europe, Central Europe and South Europe then east into European Russia and Siberia to Kamchatka. Nearctic: Alaska to Arizona (records may be referable to M. fisherii (Walton).

== Biology ==
Habitat: streams with Salix, Salix carr, beside streams and rivers fringed by Salix. Flowers visited include white umbellifers, Foeniculum, Euphorbia, Filipendula ulmaria, Sorbus. The flight period is May to September.Larvae predate aphids.
