= Melangyna barbifrons =

Scientific classification
- Kingdom: Animalia
- Phylum: Arthropoda
- Class: Insecta
- Order: Diptera
- Family: Syrphidae
- Genus: Melangyna
- Species: M. barbifrons

Binomial name
- Melangyna barbifrons (Fallén, 1817)

Synonyms

Species of fly

Melangyna barbifrons is a European species of hoverfly.
