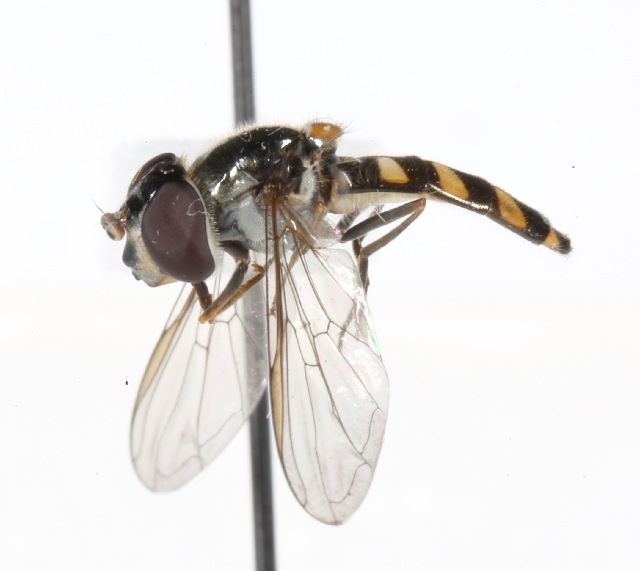

Scientific classification
- Kingdom: Animalia
- Phylum: Arthropoda
- Class: Insecta
- Order: Diptera
- Family: Syrphidae
- Genus: Melangyna
- Species: M. collatus

Binomial name
- Melangyna collatus Walker, 1852

= Melangyna collatus =

Species of hoverfly

Melangyna (Austrosyrphus) collatus is a species of hoverfly found throughout Australia.

== Description ==
Head yellow with black hairs and dark red eyes. Dark legs with yellow knees. Four large, triangular spots on the abdomen, and a bicoloured scutellum.
