= Melangyna arctica =

Scientific classification
- Kingdom: Animalia
- Phylum: Arthropoda
- Class: Insecta
- Order: Diptera
- Family: Syrphidae
- Genus: Melangyna
- Species: M. arctica

Binomial name
- Melangyna arctica (Zetterstedt, 1838)

Synonyms

Species of fly

Melangyna arctica is a Holarctic species of hoverfly.

== Description ==
External images For terms see Morphology of Diptera The wing length ranges from 5·75-7·5 mm. Tergites 3 and 4 display white to yellow marks. The wing membrane is entirely covered with microtrichia, and the scutellar hairs are no longer than the scutellum. The male terminalia was illustrated by Hippa (1968), and the larva was depicted in colour by Rotheray (1994).

See references for determination'

== Distribution ==
Palearctic Fennoscandia, Britain and Ireland, Schwarzwald (Germany), the Czech Republic, France (Pyrenees and Alps), Switzerland, Liechtenstein. North and Central Siberia to Kamchatka.Nearctic Alaska and Canada, Rocky mountains to as far as Colorado.

== Biology ==
Habitat: Abies, Picea, Pinus forest and deciduous woodland (Alnus, Betula Salix). Arboreal, but descends to visit flowers of Acer pseudoplatanus, Galium, Ilex, Prunus spinosa, Ranunculus, Salix, Stellaria, Taraxacum. The flight period is April to June ( later at higher altitudes). The larva is associated with aphid-infested trees.
