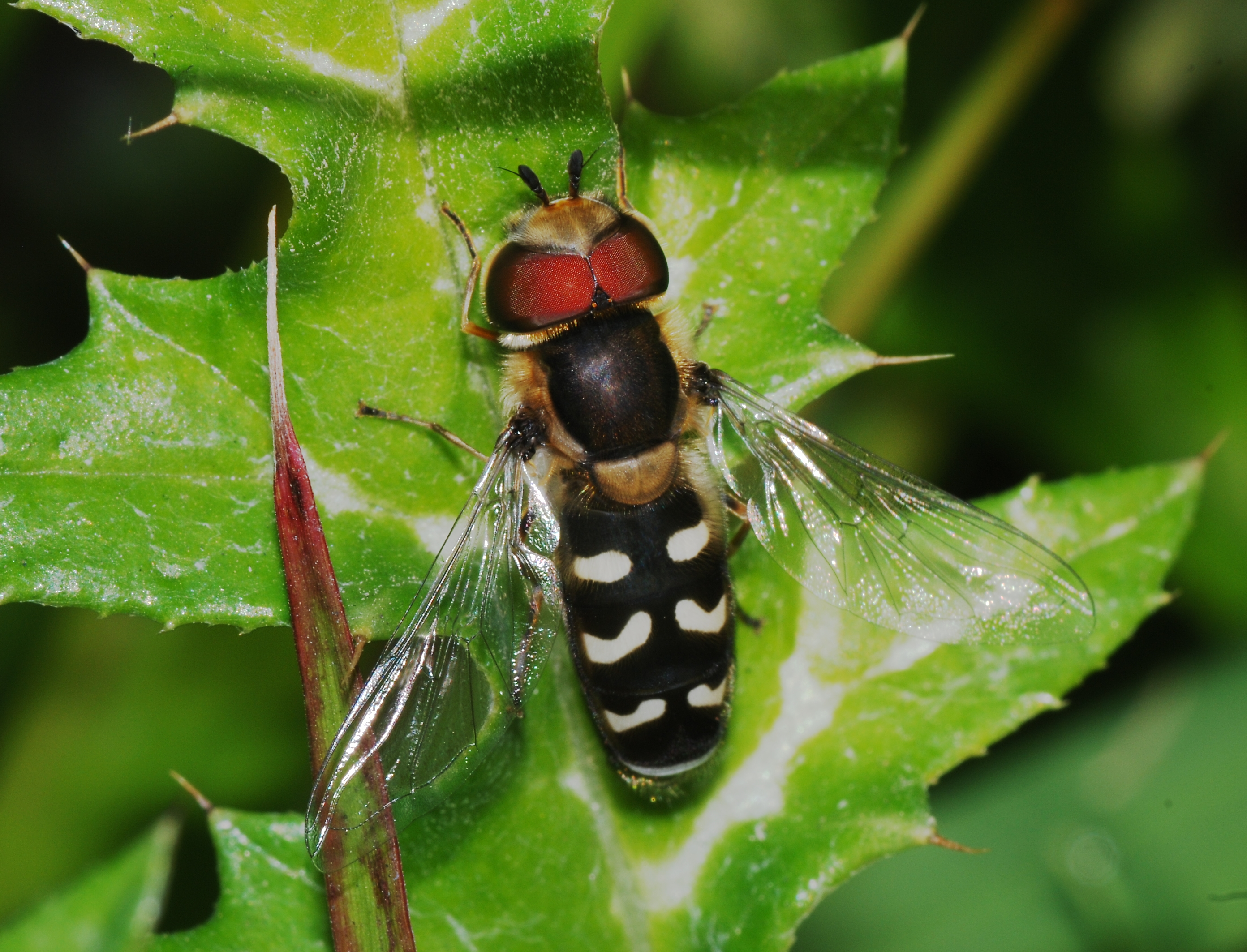
- Male
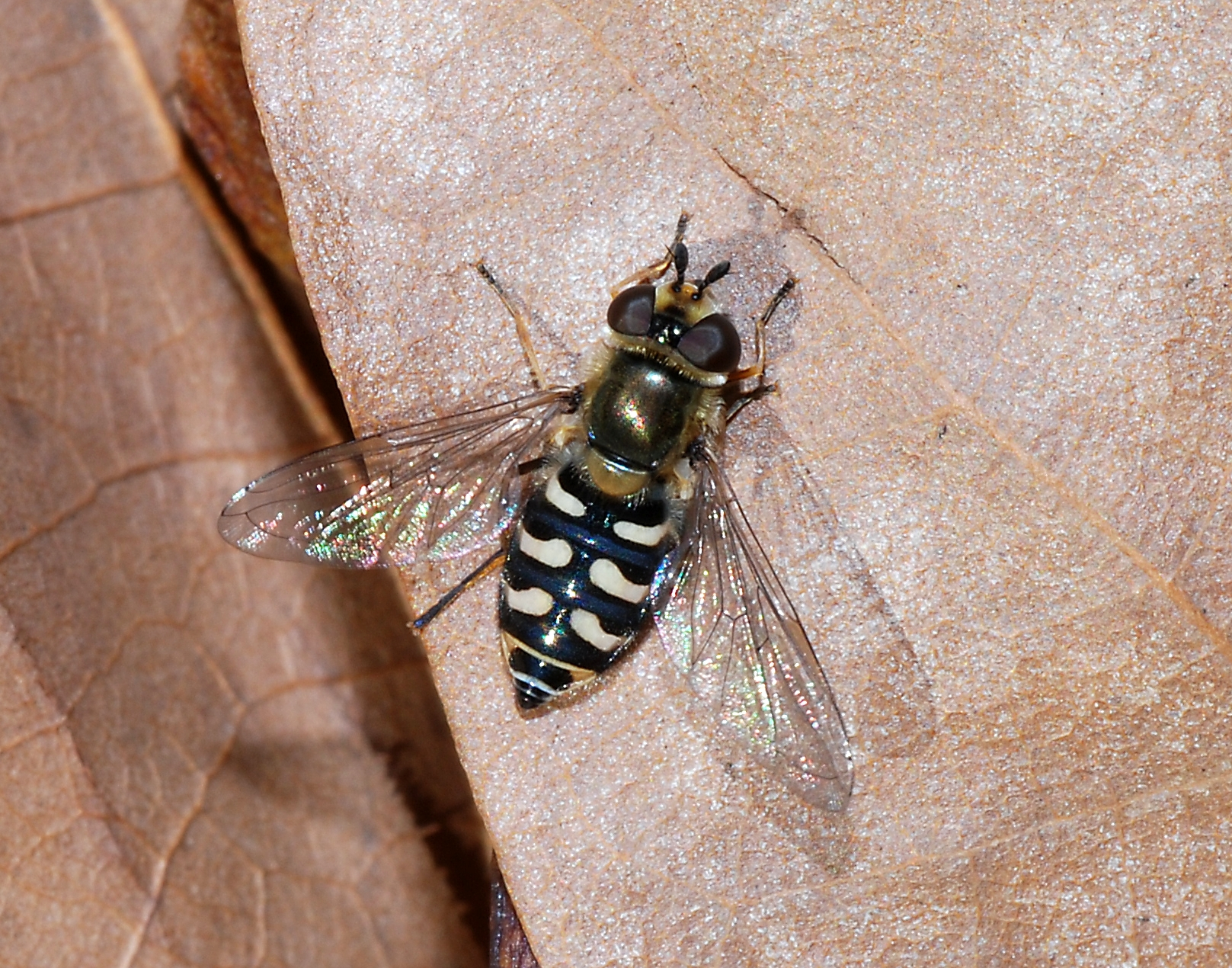
- Female

Scientific classification
- Kingdom: Animalia
- Phylum: Arthropoda
- Class: Insecta
- Order: Diptera
- Family: Syrphidae
- Genus: Scaeva
- Species: S. pyrastri

Binomial name
- Scaeva pyrastri (Linnaeus, 1758)

Synonyms
- Musca mellina Harris, 1780; Musca pyrastri Linnaeus, 1758; Scaeva affinis Say, 1823; Scaeva mellina (Harris, 1780); Scaeva unicolor Curtis, 1834; Scaeva unicolor Curtis, 1831

= Scaeva pyrastri =

Species of fly

Scaeva pyrastri, common name the pied hoverfly, is a species of hoverfly.

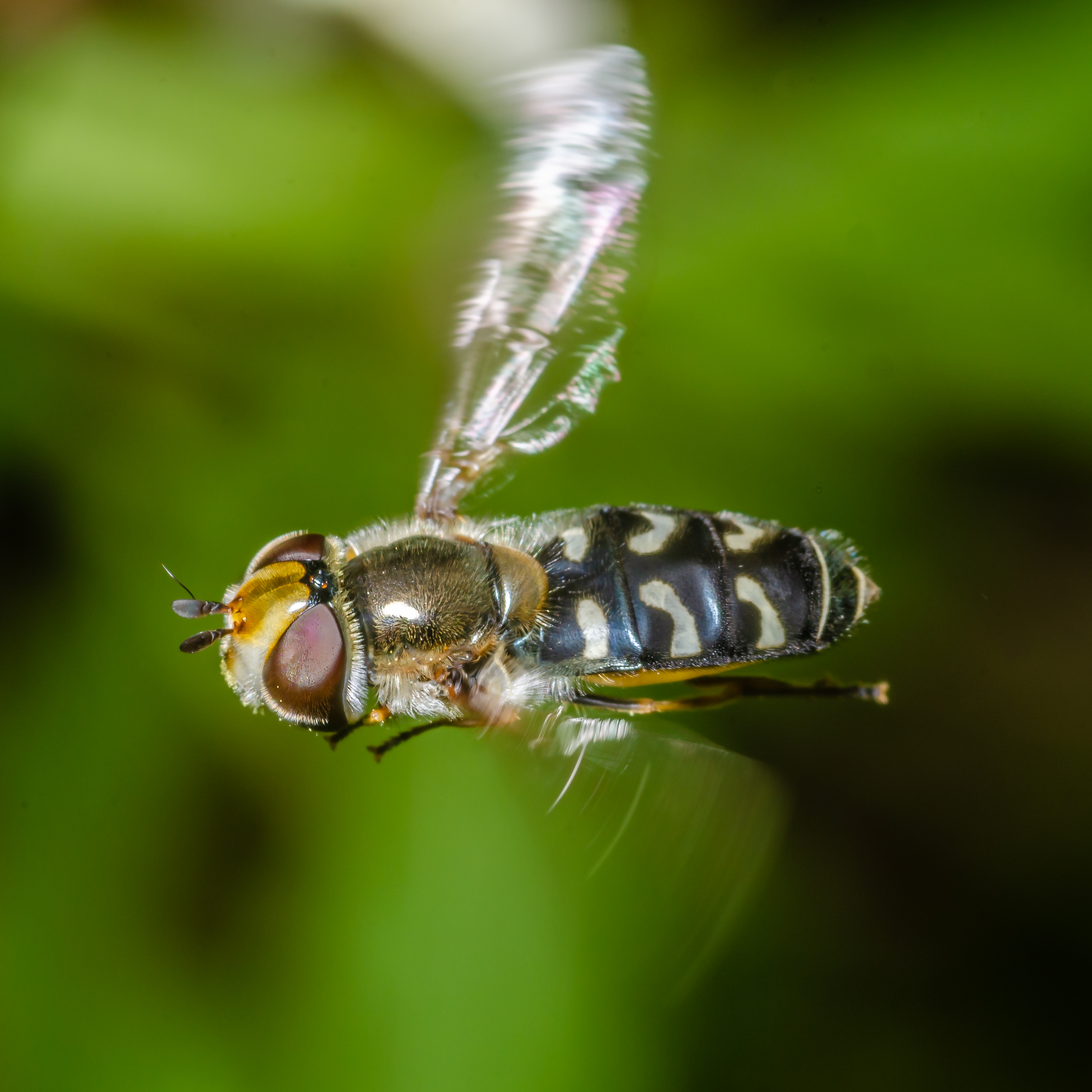
Female in flight

== Distribution ==
These hoverflies are present in most of Europe, the Near East, the East Palearctic realm, the Nearctic realm, North Africa, and the Indomalayan realm. In the UK S. pyrastri is a migrant which arrives in some years in high numbers and in others is almost absent.

== Description ==
Scaeva pyrastri can reach a length of 11–15 millimetres (0.43–0.59 in). This large distinctive fly has three pairs of white comma markings (lunules) on the abdomen, these are yellow on Scaeva selenitica.

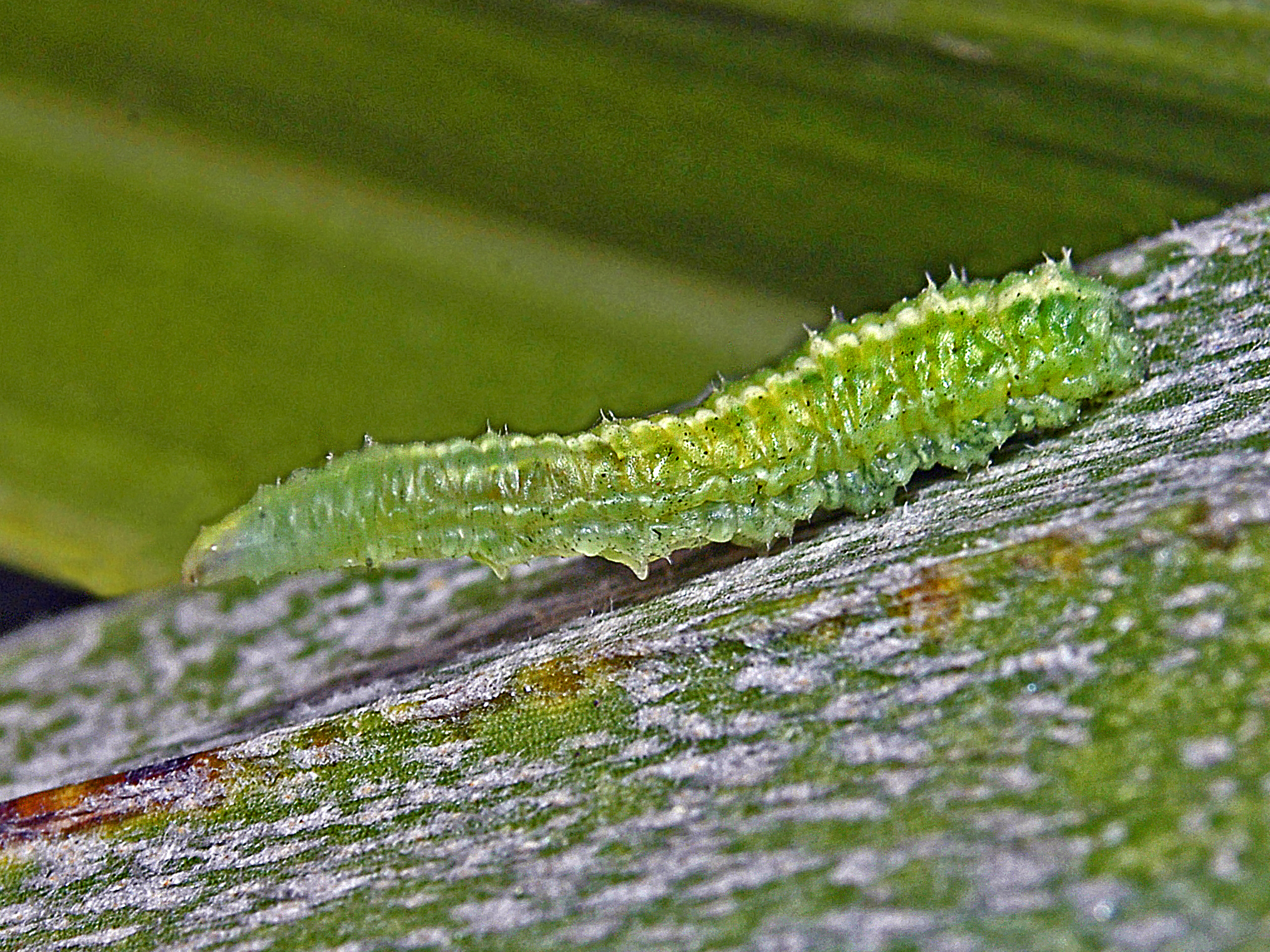
Larva of Scaeva pyrastri

The face is yellow, with reddish brown antennae. The eyes are covered with hair. Scutellum is brown yellow. The legs are red with a black base of the femur. The male's eyes do touch in the centre of the frons, while in the females they are separated.

The larvae are light green or sometimes pink, with a white dorsal longitudinal stripe.

== Habitat and behavior ==
This species can be found in gardens, meadows and wasteland. Adults are common visitors to flowers of Apiaceae (Umbelliferae), but also of rape, honeysuckle and daisies. They fly from April to September, with the peak in July and August. The larvae feed on different aphid species. During the larval stages they may consume over 500 aphids.

== Bibliography ==
- Gerald Bothe: Schwebfliegen. Deutscher Jugendbund für Naturbeobachtung, Hamburg 1996.
- Joachim and Hiroko Haupt: Fliegen und Mücken: Beobachtung, Lebensweise. Naturbuch-Verlag, Augsburg 1998, ISBN 3-89440-278-4.
- Kurt Kormann: Schwebfliegen und Blasenkopffliegen Mitteleuropas. Fauna Verlag, Nottuln 2003, ISBN 3-935980-29-9.
- R. Bugg et al. 2008. - Flower Flies (Syrphidae) and other biological control agents for aphids in vegetable crops - UC ANR Publication 8285.
- Thompson F.C., Pape T., Evenhuis N.L. (2013) Systema Dipterorum
