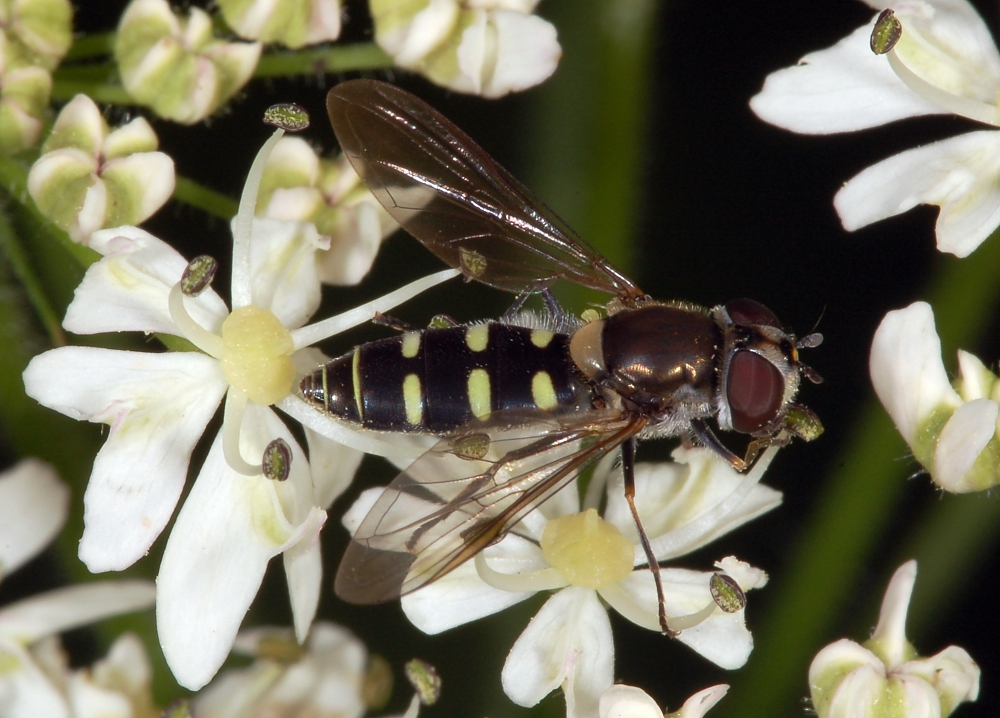
- Melangyna labiatarum female

Scientific classification
- Kingdom: Animalia
- Phylum: Arthropoda
- Class: Insecta
- Order: Diptera
- Family: Syrphidae
- Genus: Melangyna
- Species: M. labiatarum

Binomial name
- Melangyna labiatarum (Verrall, 1901)

Synonyms
- Syrphus labiatarum Verrall, 1901

= Melangyna labiatarum =

Species of fly

Melangyna labiatarum is a European species of hoverfly.
