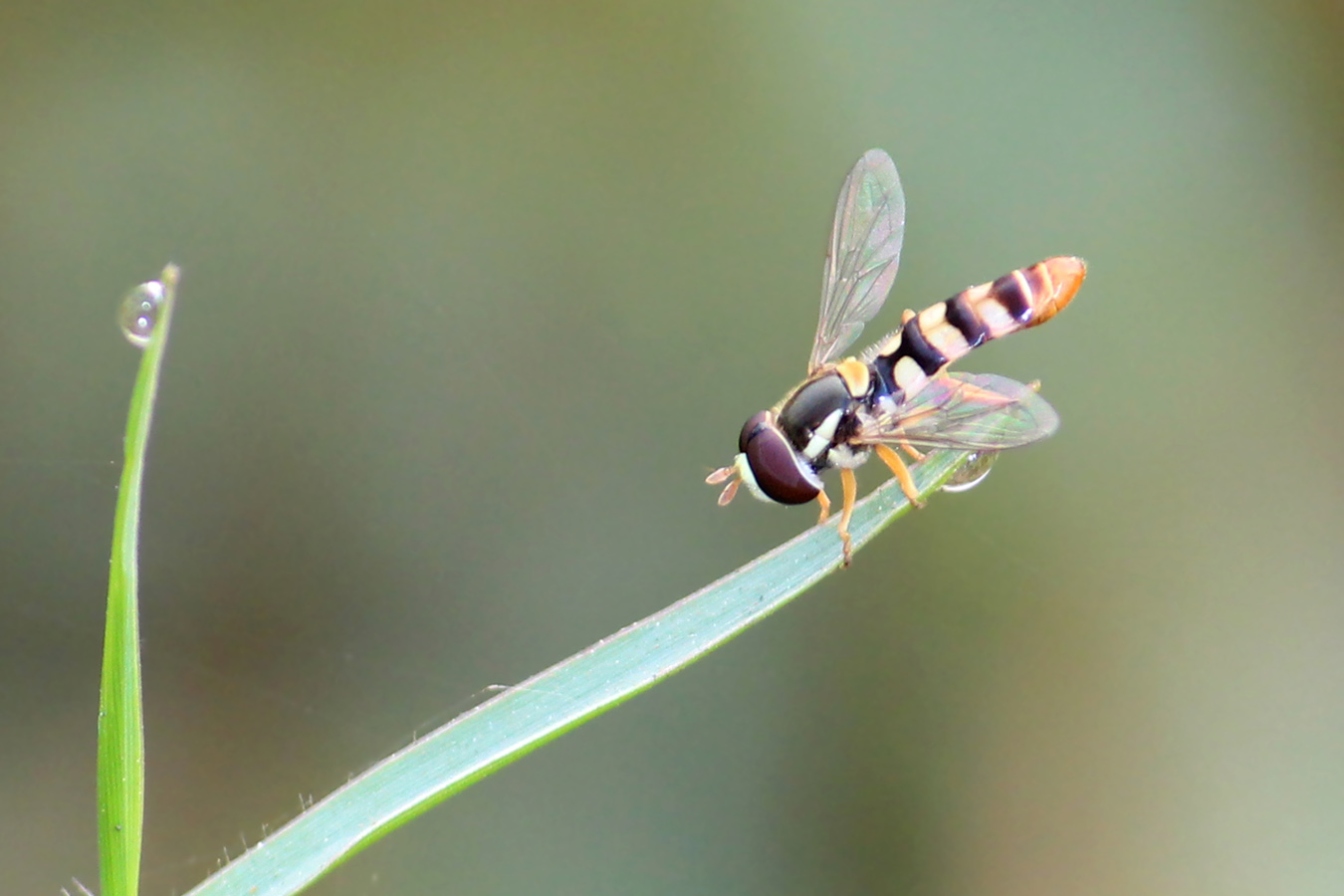

Scientific classification
- Kingdom: Animalia
- Phylum: Arthropoda
- Clade: Pancrustacea
- Class: Insecta
- Order: Diptera
- Family: Syrphidae
- Genus: Ischiodon
- Species: I. scutellaris

Binomial name
- Ischiodon scutellaris (Fabricius, 1805)

Synonyms
- Syrphus scutellaris

= Ischiodon scutellaris =

Species of hover fly

Ischiodon scutellaris, commonly known as the common hover fly or yellow-shouldered hover fly, is a species of hover fly found in India, Turkey to Japan and Australia, as well as all the Pacific islands except for Hawaii.

Larvae feed on aphids, and are considered an effective biological control agent.

== Description ==
Eyes are glabrous, abdomen is flat and slightly convex dorsally. Body length of about 1 cm. Thorax is shiny black, and has a yellow edge to each side. Scutellum yellow, post alar callus black. Legs are mostly orange to yellow, although the coxae and trochanters are black.

Eggs oval and white. Larvae bright green-yellow in colour, with a white stripe running across the body.
