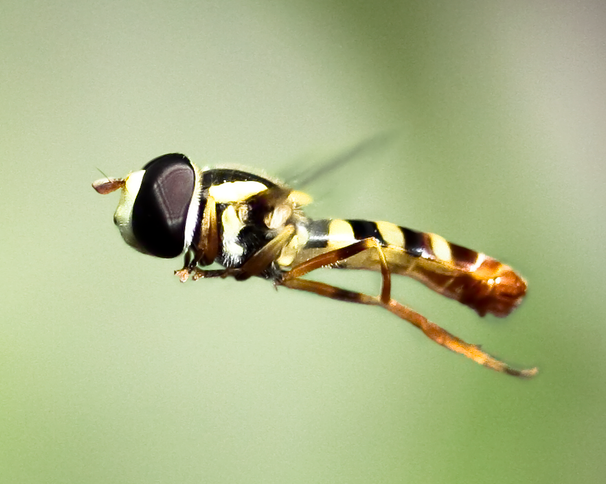
- Ischiodon sp.

Scientific classification
- Kingdom: Animalia
- Phylum: Arthropoda
- Class: Insecta
- Order: Diptera
- Family: Syrphidae
- Subfamily: Syrphinae
- Tribe: Syrphini
- Genus: Ischiodon; Sack, 1913

Type species
- Ischiodon trochanterica Sack, 1913

= Ischiodon =

Genus of flies

Ischiodon is a genus of hoverfly.

== Species ==
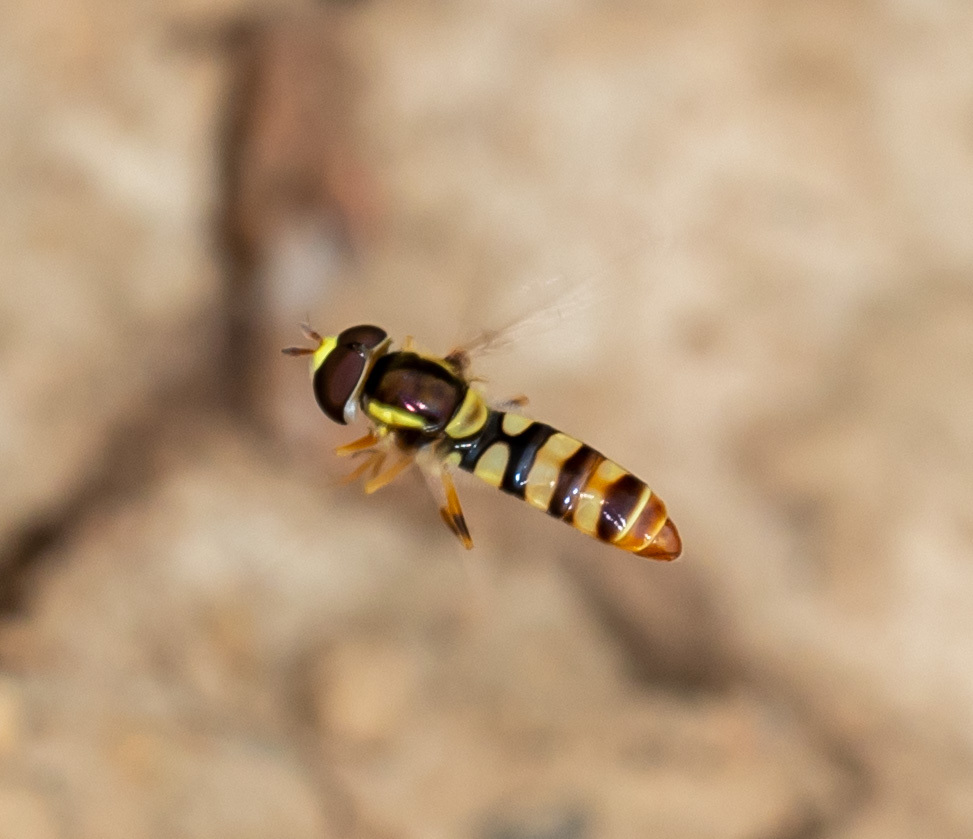
I. scutellaris from Thailand

- Ischiodon aegyptius (Wiedemann, 1830)
- Ischiodon astales Mengual 2018
- Ischiodon feae (Bezzi, 1912)
- Ischiodon scutellaris
