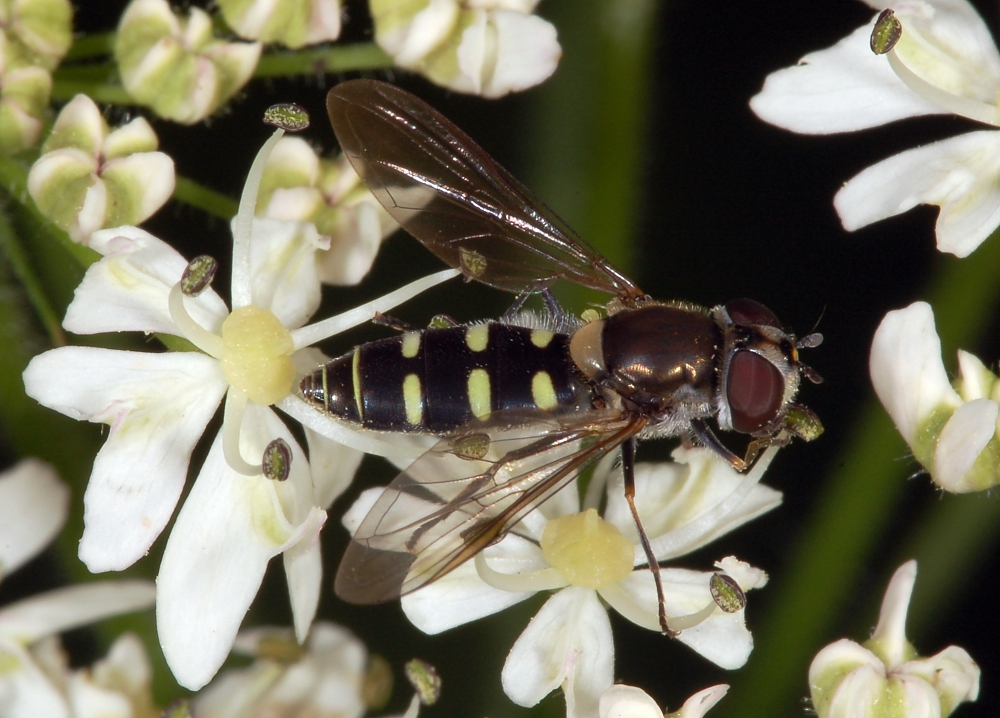
- Melangyna labiatarum female

Scientific classification
- Kingdom: Animalia
- Phylum: Arthropoda
- Clade: Pancrustacea
- Class: Insecta
- Order: Diptera
- Family: Syrphidae
- Subfamily: Syrphinae
- Tribe: Syrphini
- Genus: Melangyna; Verrall, 1901

Synonyms
- Fagisyrphus Dusek & Láska, 1967; Stenosyrphus Matsumura & Adachi, 1917

= Melangyna =

Genus of flies

Melangyna is a genus of hoverflies.

== Species ==
Subgenus: Melangyna

- Melangyna abietis (Matsumura, 1918)
- Melangyna arctica (Zetterstedt, 1838)
- Melangyna arsenjevi (Mutin, 1986)
- Melangyna barbifrons (Fallén, 1817)
- Melangyna basarukini (Mutin, 1998)
- Melangyna coei Nielsen, 1971
- Melangyna compositarum (Verrall, 1873)
- Melangyna ericarum (Collin, 1946)
- Melangyna evittata (Huo & Ren, 2007)
- Melangyna fisherii (Walton, 1911)
- Melangyna grandimaculata (Huo & Ren, 2007)
- Melangyna heilongjiangensis (Huo, 2006)
- Melangyna hwangi (He & Li, 1992)
- Melangyna labiatarum (Verrall, 1901)
- Melangyna lasiophthalma (Zetterstedt, 1843)
- Melangyna lucifera Nielsen, 1980
- Melangyna macromaculata (Mutin, 1998)
- Melangyna ochreolinea (Hull, 1944)
- Melangyna olsujevi (Violovitsh, 1956)
- Melangyna pavlovskyi (Violovitsh, 1956)
- Melangyna qinlingensis (Huo & Ren, 2007)
- Melangyna quadrimaculata Verrall, 1873
- Melangyna sexguttata Meigen, 1838
- Melangyna stackelbergi (Violovitsh, 1980)
- Melangyna subfasciata (Curran, 1925)
- Melangyna tsherepanovi (Violovitsh, 1965)
- Melangyna umbellatarum (Fabricius, 1794)
- Melangyna xiaowutaiensis (Huo & Ren, 2007)

Subgenus: Austrosyrphus

- Melangyna ambusta Walker, 1852
- Melangyna collata Walker, 1852
- Melangyna damastor Walker, 1849
- Melangyna jacksoni Bigot, 1884
- Melangyna novaezealandiae (Macquart, 1855)
- Melangyna sellenyi Schiner, 1868
- Melangyna viridiceps (Macquart, 1847)

Subgenus: Melanosyrphus

- Melangyna dichoptica Vockeroth, 1969
