= Lesser bulb fly =

Lesser bulb fly is a common name for several insects and may refer to:

- Eumerus strigatus
- Eumerus funeralis
