= Nausigaster texana =

Scientific classification
- Kingdom: Animalia
- Phylum: Arthropoda
- Clade: Pancrustacea
- Class: Insecta
- Order: Diptera
- Family: Syrphidae
- Tribe: Merodontini
- Genus: Nausigaster
- Species: N. texana

Binomial name
- Nausigaster texana Curran, 1941

Species of fly

Nausigaster texana is a species of syrphid fly in the family Syrphidae.
