= Nausigaster unimaculata =

Scientific classification
- Kingdom: Animalia
- Phylum: Arthropoda
- Clade: Pancrustacea
- Class: Insecta
- Order: Diptera
- Family: Syrphidae
- Tribe: Merodontini
- Genus: Nausigaster
- Species: N. unimaculata

Binomial name
- Nausigaster unimaculata Townsend, 1897

Species of fly

Nausigaster unimaculata is a species of syrphid fly in the family Syrphidae.
