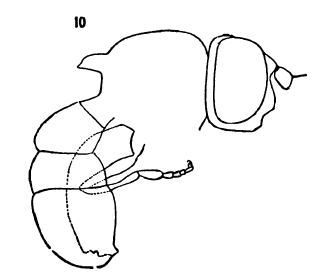
- Nausigaster punctulata male

Scientific classification
- Kingdom: Animalia
- Phylum: Arthropoda
- Clade: Pancrustacea
- Class: Insecta
- Order: Diptera
- Family: Syrphidae
- Tribe: Merodontini
- Genus: Nausigaster
- Species: N. punctulata

Binomial name
- Nausigaster punctulata Williston, 1883

= Nausigaster punctulata =

Species of fly

Nausigaster punctulata is a species of syrphid fly in the family Syrphidae.
