= Eumerus sogdianus =

Scientific classification
- Kingdom: Animalia
- Phylum: Arthropoda
- Clade: Pancrustacea
- Class: Insecta
- Order: Diptera
- Family: Syrphidae
- Genus: Eumerus
- Species: E. sogdianus

Binomial name
- Eumerus sogdianus Stackelberg, 1952

Species of fly

Eumerus sogdianus is a species of Hoverfly, from the family Syrphidae, in the order Diptera.
