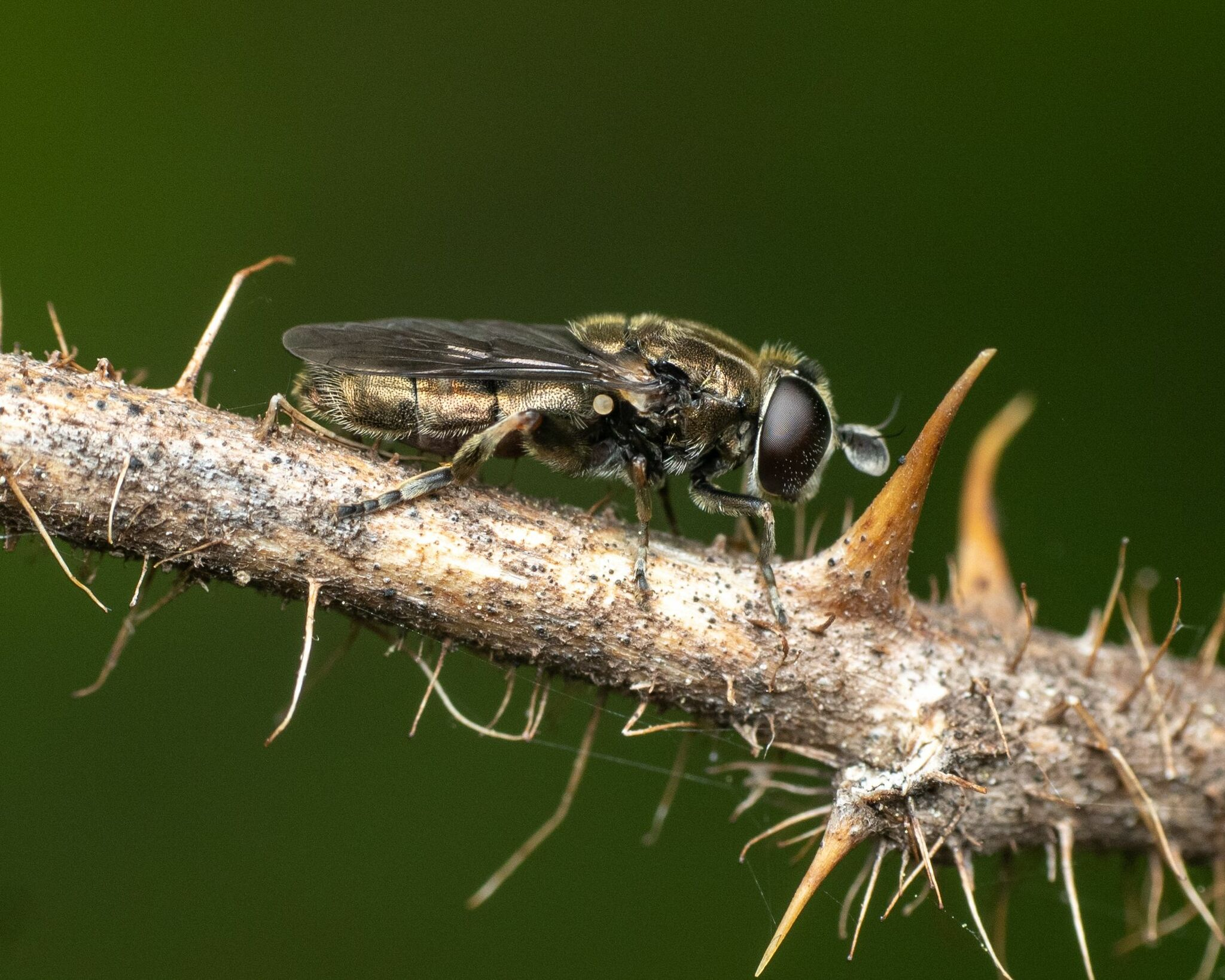

Scientific classification
- Kingdom: Animalia
- Phylum: Arthropoda
- Clade: Pancrustacea
- Class: Insecta
- Order: Diptera
- Family: Syrphidae
- Genus: Eumerus
- Species: E. tuberculatus

Binomial name
- Eumerus tuberculatus Rondani, 1857

= Eumerus tuberculatus =

Species of fly

Eumerus tuberculatus, the lesser bulb fly (a common name shared by several species of this genus) is a species of hoverfly from the family Syrphidae, in the order Diptera. It is a pest that destroys the bulbs of Narcissus.
