= Alipumilio =

Scientific classification
- Kingdom: Animalia
- Phylum: Arthropoda
- Clade: Pancrustacea
- Class: Insecta
- Order: Diptera
- Family: Syrphidae
- Tribe: Merodontini
- Genus: Alipumilio; Shannon, 1927

Type species
- Alipumilio femoratus Shannon, 1927

Genus of flies

Alipumilio is a South American genus of 12 species of hoverfly. Where known these flies breed in sap flowing from trees, examples having been reared from the sap of Araucaria.

== Species ==
- A. athesphatus Thompson, 2009
- A. avispas Vockeroth, 1964
- A. femoratus Shannon, 1927
- A. nigrocoeruleus Vockeroth, 1964
- A. pullatus Vockeroth, 1964
