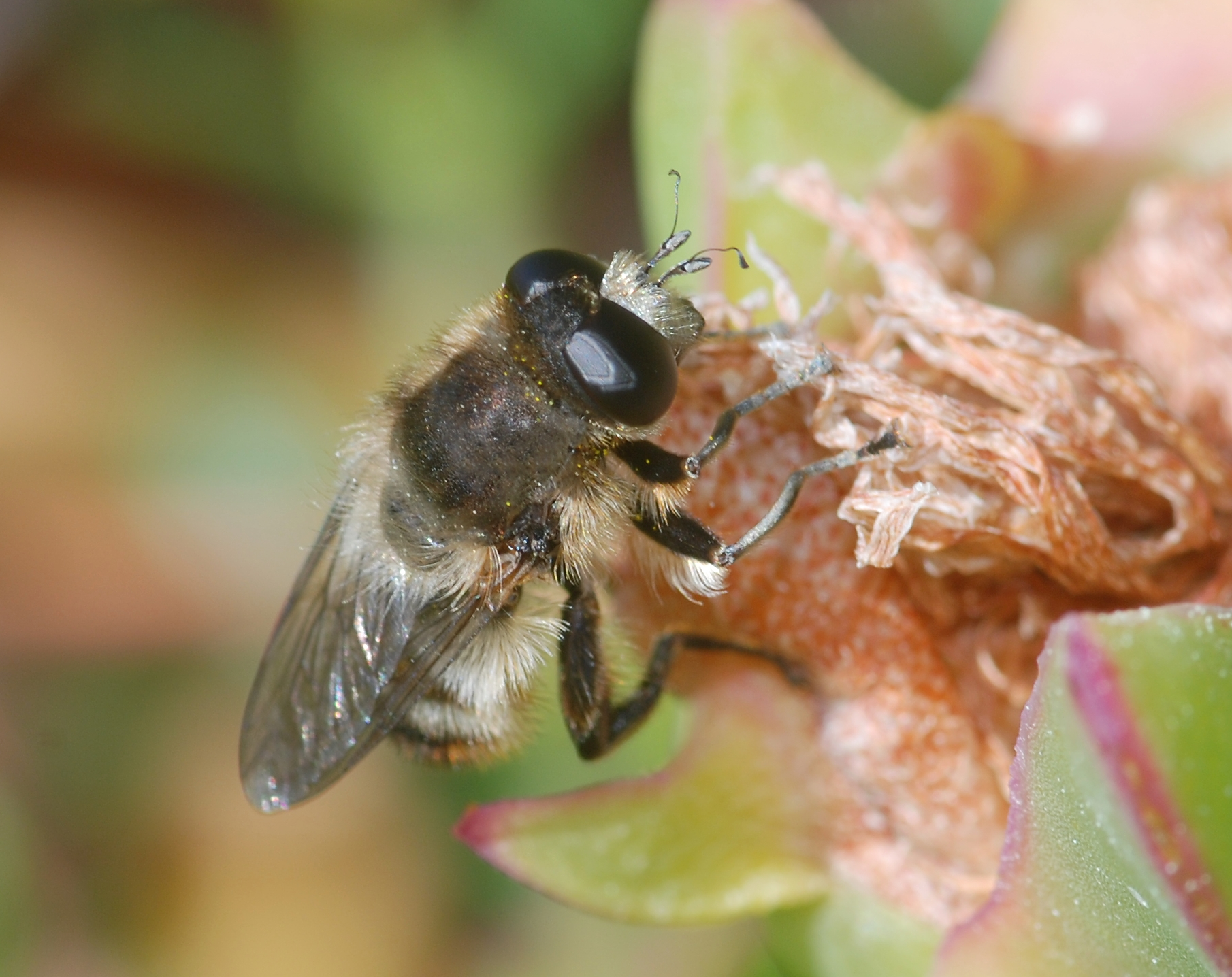
- Platynochaetus setosus male

Scientific classification
- Kingdom: Animalia
- Phylum: Arthropoda
- Clade: Pancrustacea
- Class: Insecta
- Order: Diptera
- Family: Syrphidae
- Subfamily: Eristalinae
- Tribe: Merodontini
- Genus: Platynochaetus; Weidemann, 1830

= Platynochaetus =

Genus of flies

Platynochaetus is a genus of hoverflies. A diagnostic feature of the genus is the peculiar shape of the male antennae.

== Species ==
- Platynochaetus macquarti Loew, 1862
- Platynochaetus rufus Macquart, 1835
- Platynochaetus setosus (Fabricius, 1794)
