= Eumerus ornatus =

Scientific classification
- Kingdom: Animalia
- Phylum: Arthropoda
- Clade: Pancrustacea
- Class: Insecta
- Order: Diptera
- Family: Syrphidae
- Genus: Eumerus
- Species: E. ornatus

Binomial name
- Eumerus ornatus Meigen, 1822

Synonyms
- Eumerus fumipennis Curtis, 1839

Species of fly

Eumerus ornatus is a species of hoverfly, from the family Syrphidae, in the order Diptera.
