= Nausigaster =

Scientific classification
- Kingdom: Animalia
- Phylum: Arthropoda
- Clade: Pancrustacea
- Class: Insecta
- Order: Diptera
- Family: Syrphidae
- Subfamily: Eristalinae
- Tribe: Merodontini
- Genus: Nausigaster; Williston, 1883

Genus of flies

Nausigaster is a genus of syrphid flies, or hoverflies, in the family Syrphidae. Larvae have been recorded from decaying cacti and bromeliads.

== Species ==
These 15 species belong to the genus Nausigaster:

- Nausigaster bonariensis Lynch Arribalzaga, 1892^{c g}
- Nausigaster chrysidiformis Shannon, 1922^{c g}
- Nausigaster clara Curran, 1941^{i c g}
- Nausigaster curvinervis Curran, 1941^{i c g}
- Nausigaster flukei Curran, 1941^{c g}
- Nausigaster geminata Townsend, 1897^{i c g}
- Nausigaster meridionalis Townsend, 1897^{c g}
- Nausigaster nova Curran, 1941^{i c g}
- Nausigaster peruviensis Shannon, 1922^{c g}
- Nausigaster punctulata Williston, 1883^{i c g b}
- Nausigaster scutellaris Adams, 1904^{i c g}
- Nausigaster texana Curran, 1941^{i c g b}
- Nausigaster tuberculata Carrera, Lopes & Lane, 1947^{c g}
- Nausigaster unimaculata Townsend, 1897^{i c g b}
- Nausigaster vanzolinii Andretta & Carrera, 1952^{c g}

Data sources: i = ITIS, c = Catalogue of Life, g = GBIF, b = Bugguide.net
