= Azpeytia =

Scientific classification
- Kingdom: Animalia
- Phylum: Arthropoda
- Clade: Pancrustacea
- Class: Insecta
- Order: Diptera
- Family: Syrphidae
- Subfamily: Eristalinae
- Tribe: Merodontini
- Genus: Azpeytia; Walker, 1865

Genus of flies

Azpeytia is a genus of hoverfly. Larvae of one species Azpeytia shirakii is known to live in the corms and stems of an orchid Gastrodia elata.

== Species ==
- Azpeytia bifascia Brunetti, 1907
- Azpeytia brunneteryla Liu, Zhao & Huo, 2022
- Azpeytia flavoscutellata Kertész, 1913
- Azpeytia maculata Shiraki, 1930
- Azpeytia scutellaris Walker, 1865
- Azpeytia shirakii Hurkmans, 1993
