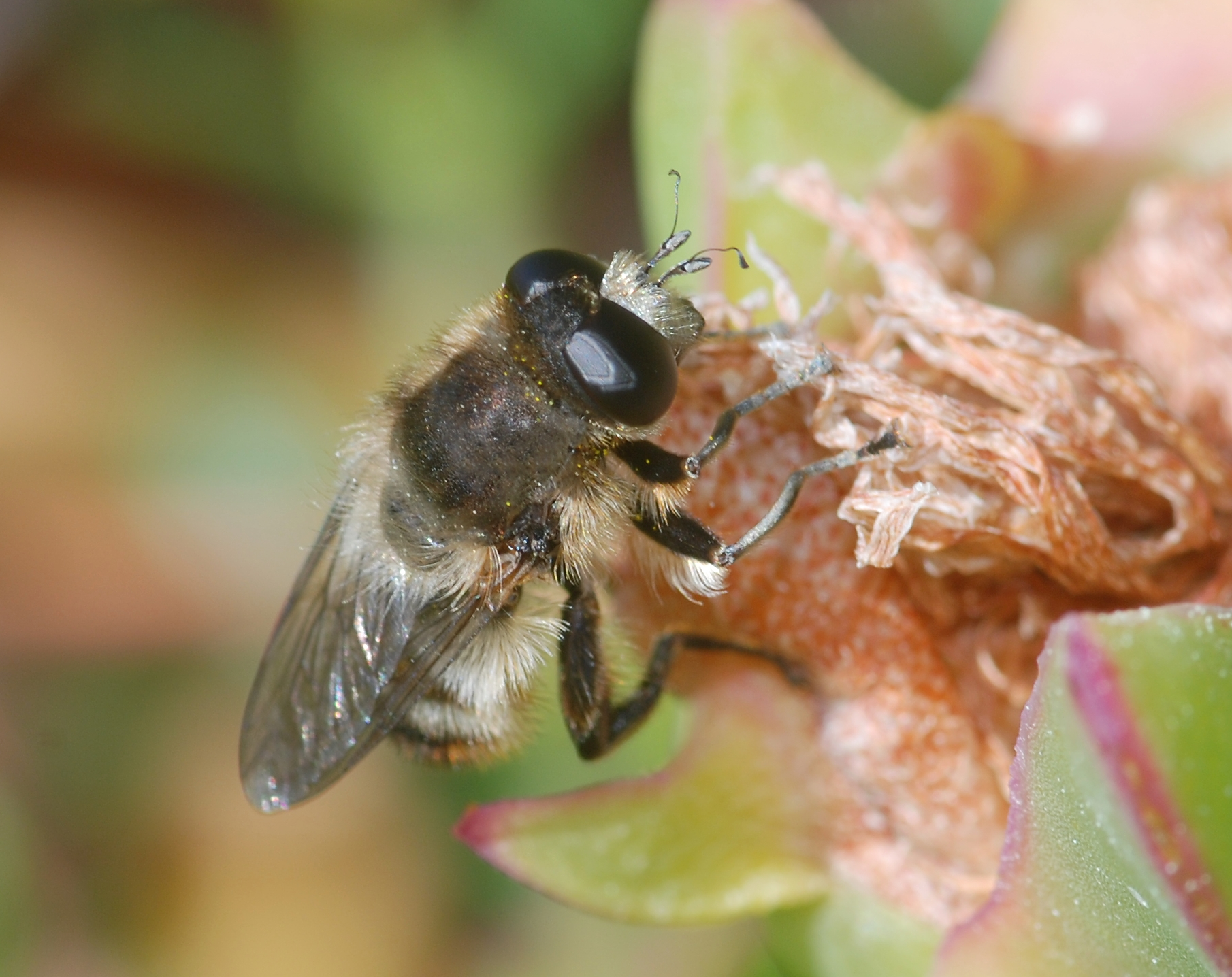

Scientific classification
- Kingdom: Animalia
- Phylum: Arthropoda
- Clade: Pancrustacea
- Class: Insecta
- Order: Diptera
- Family: Syrphidae
- Genus: Platynochaetus
- Species: P. setosus

Binomial name
- Platynochaetus setosus Fabricius, 1794

= Platynochaetus setosus =

Species of fly

Platynochaetus setosus is a species of hoverfly, from the family Syrphidae, in the order Diptera. It can be found from March to May in evergreen oak (Quercus ilex) woodland in Spain, Portugal and other countries around the western mediterranean.
