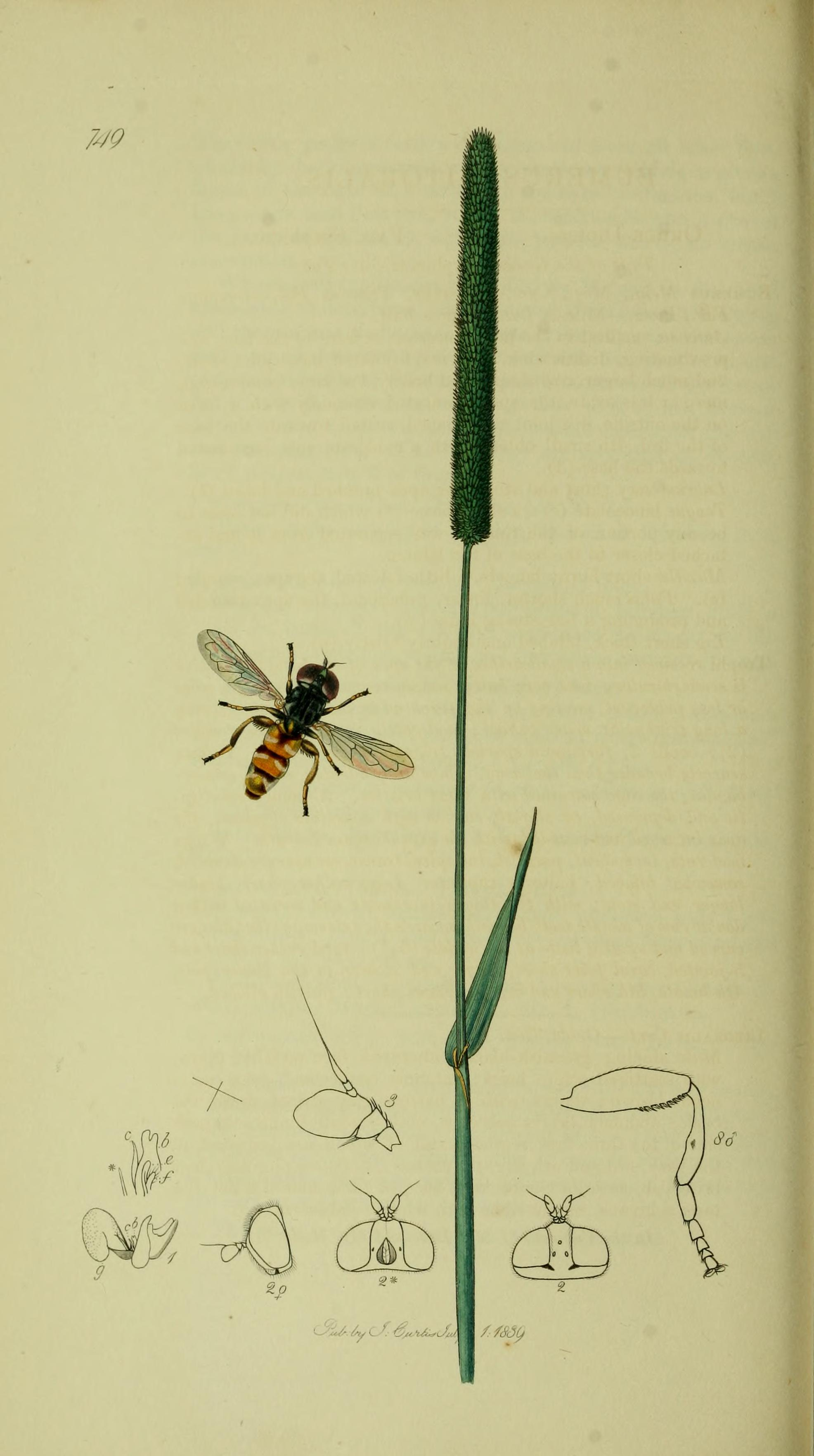

Scientific classification
- Kingdom: Animalia
- Phylum: Arthropoda
- Clade: Pancrustacea
- Class: Insecta
- Order: Diptera
- Family: Syrphidae
- Genus: Eumerus
- Species: E. sabulonum

Binomial name
- Eumerus sabulonum (Fallén, 1817)

Synonyms
- Pipiza sabulonum Fallén, 1817; Eumerus selene Meigen, 1822; Eumerus litoralis Curtis, 1839

= Eumerus sabulonum =

Species of fly

Eumerus sabulonum is a species of hoverfly, from the family Syrphidae in the order Diptera.
