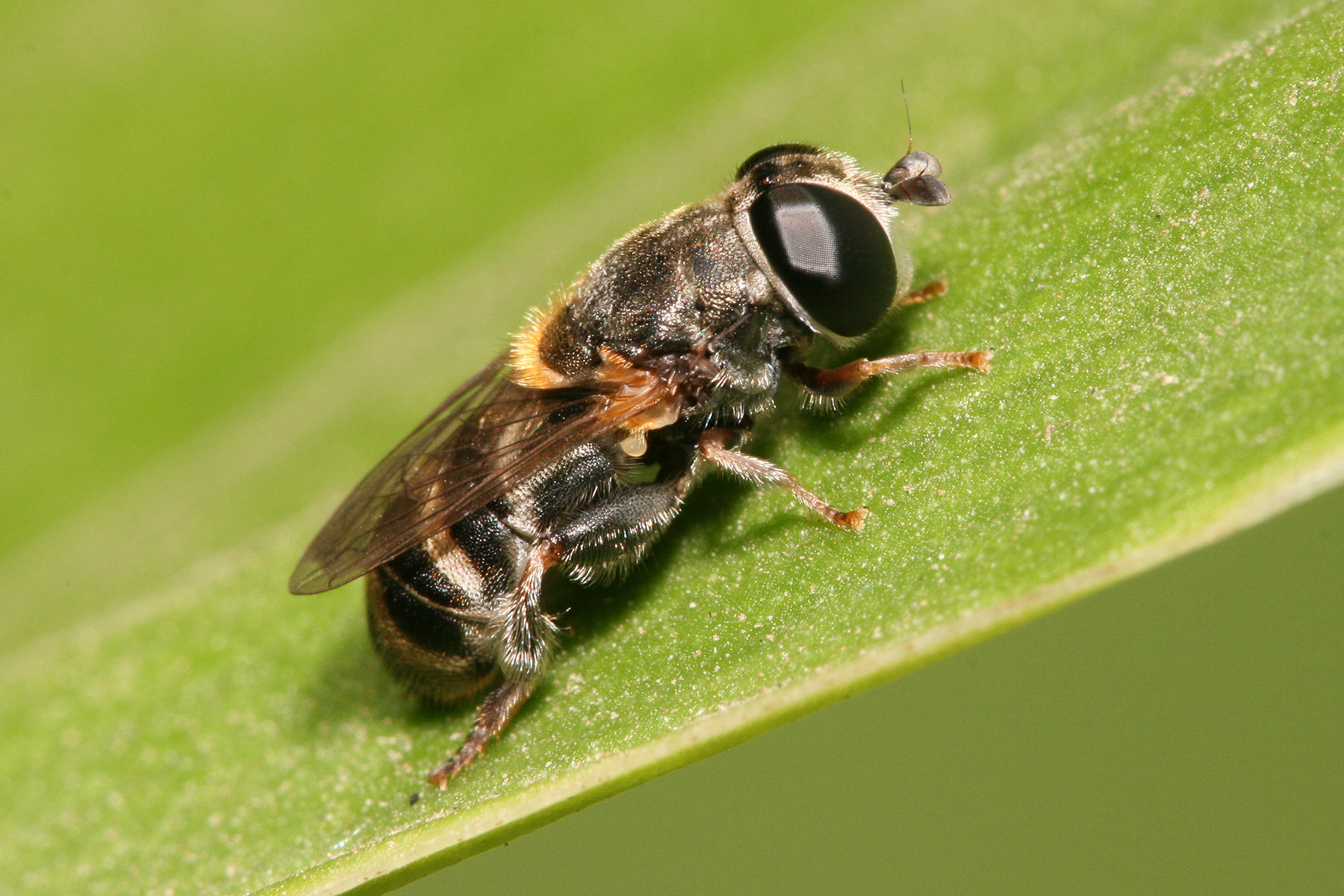
- Female Eumerus feae

Scientific classification
- Kingdom: Animalia
- Phylum: Arthropoda
- Clade: Pancrustacea
- Class: Insecta
- Order: Diptera
- Family: Syrphidae
- Subfamily: Eristalinae
- Tribe: Merodontini
- Genus: Eumerus; Meigen, 1822

Type species
- Syrphus tricolor Fabricius, 1798

Species
- See text

Synonyms
- Paragopsis Matsumura, 1916

= Eumerus =

Genus of flies

Eumerus is a genus of hoverflies (family Syrphidae), within the tribe Merodontini.

They are small with a distinctive smooth round abdomen, powerful back legs and yellow hairs around the scutellum. Others have a dark scutellum and yellow antennae. They have a flat hairy face and a reentrant upper crossvein on the wings. Some species are pests of ornamental flowers. The genus contains 281 known species, making it one of the largest genera of flies.

== Description ==
Eumerus species are small to medium (5–12 mm), black hoverflies with a smooth wide, almost cylindrical body. The hind legs are remarkably powerful. They have compound eyes with fine hairs that in the male cover most of the head, but in the female are parted over the forehead. The antennae are quite short, dark coloured or orange. The face is flat with downwardly directed hairs. The thorax has a few light longitudinal stripes on its back which are more visible in the front half. The legs are yellowish, or white and black, with the upper back legs usually greatly thickened (except Eumerus flavitarsis), the lower part being curved and sharp, with expanded feet. The abdomen is roughly cylindrical, and clearly constricted at the boundaries between the various parts. The second, third and fourth part has silvery white or yellow oblique spots. In some species, the entire abdomen is a reddish brown. The wings are covered with fine hairs (microtrichia) on the entire surface. Otherwise they are clear except for a brown-black wing mark. The front cross-vein along the outer edge of the wing has a pronounced kink in the middle.

== Gallery ==
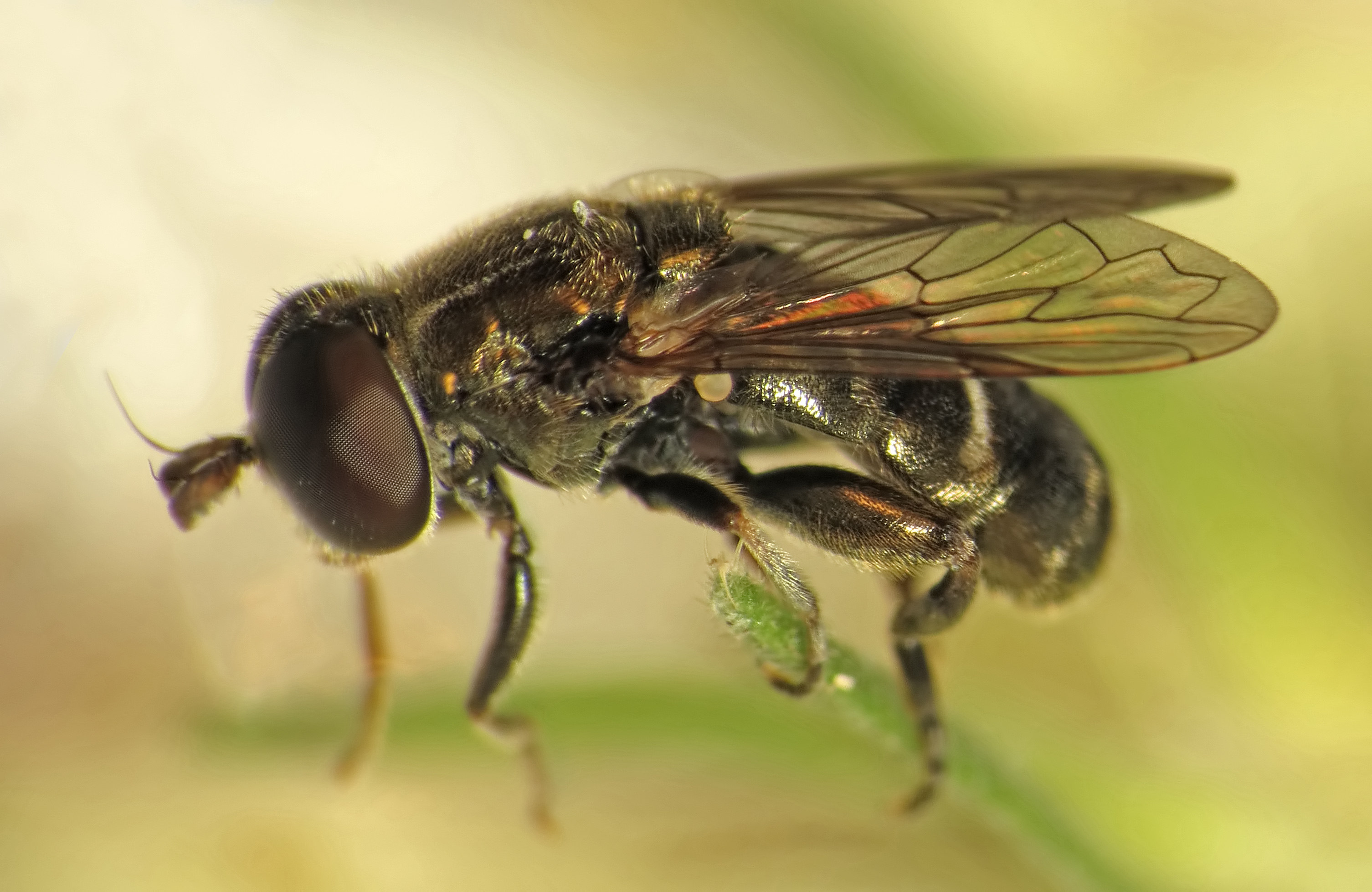
Eumerus funeralis

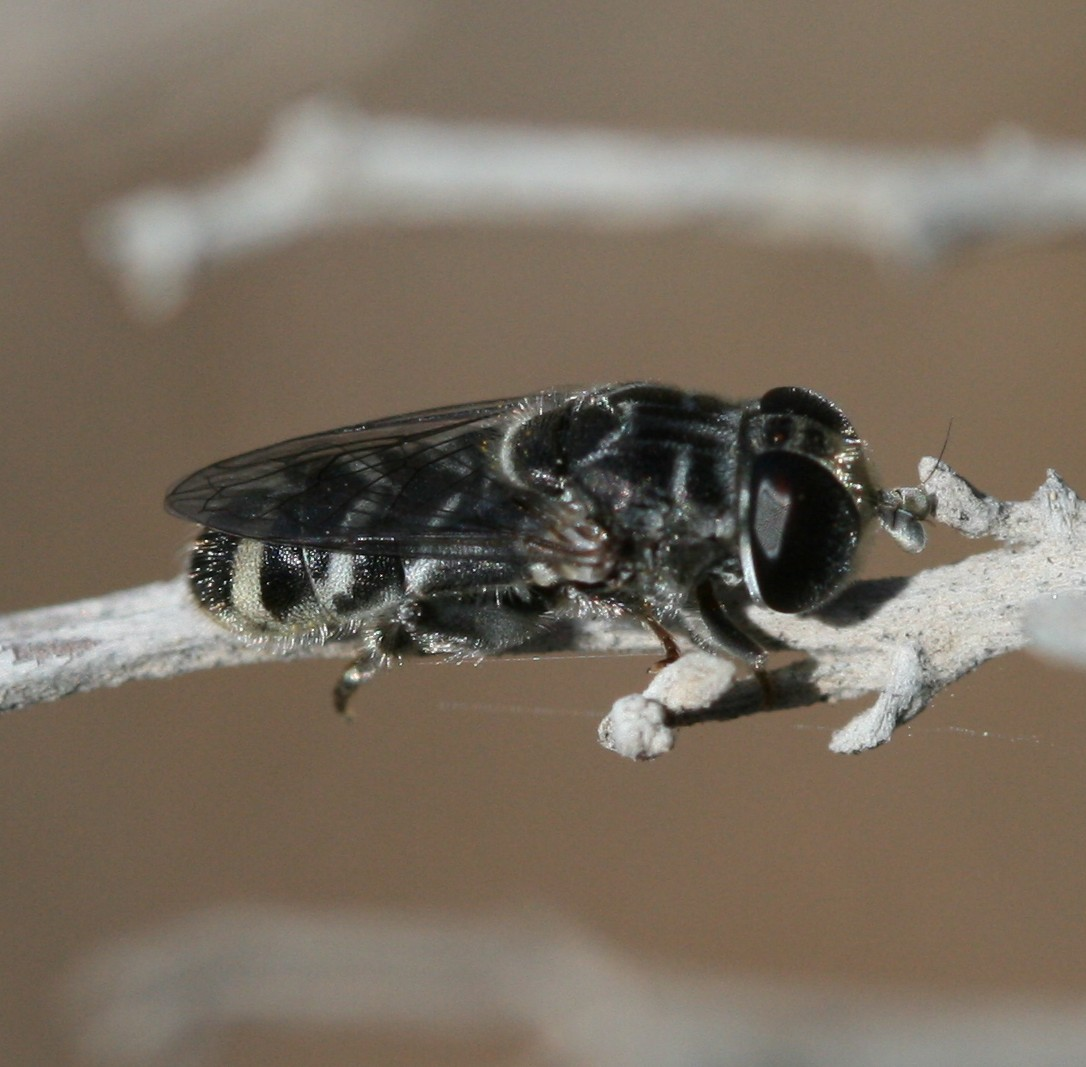
Eumerus latitarsus

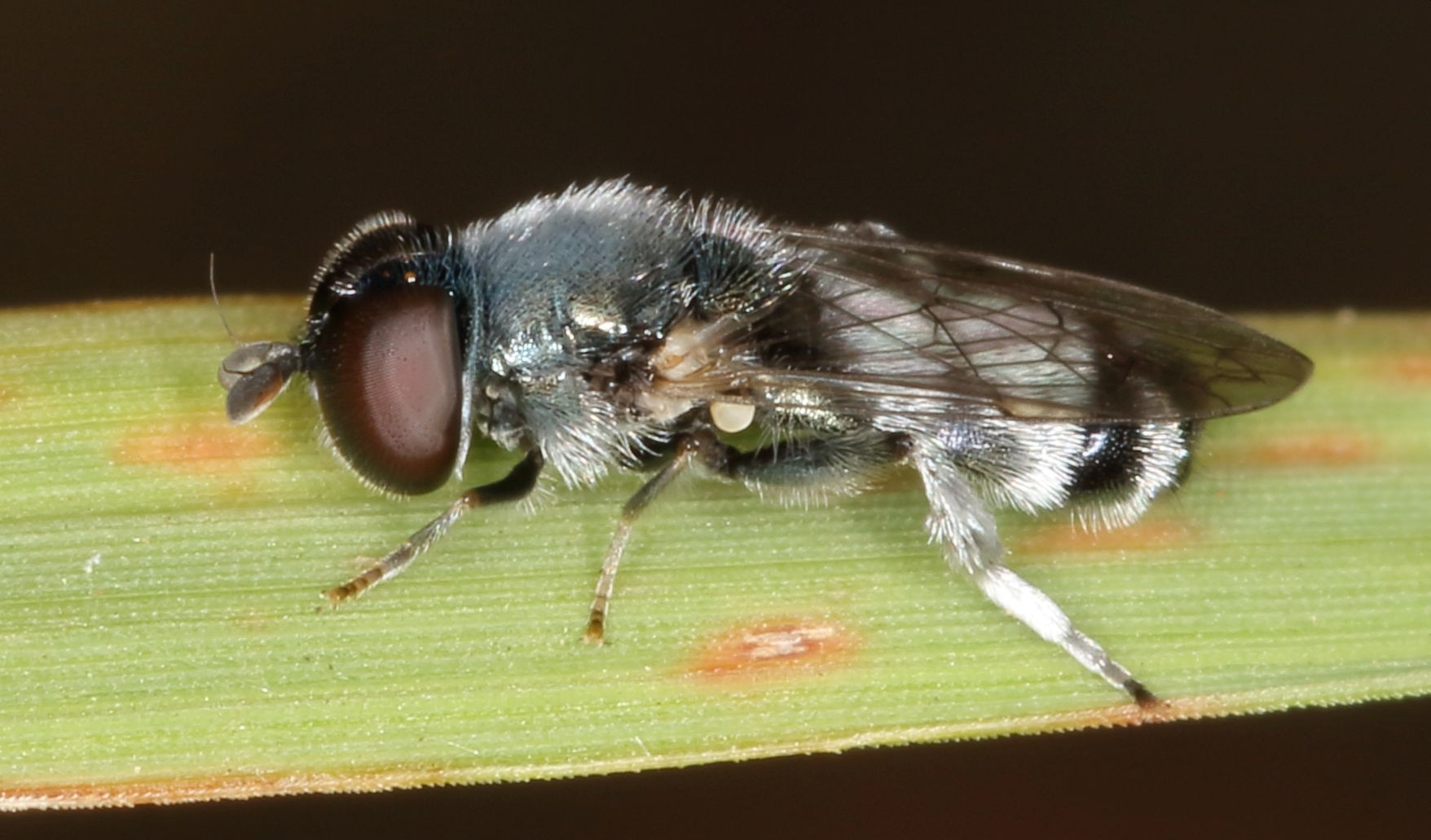
Eumerus paulae

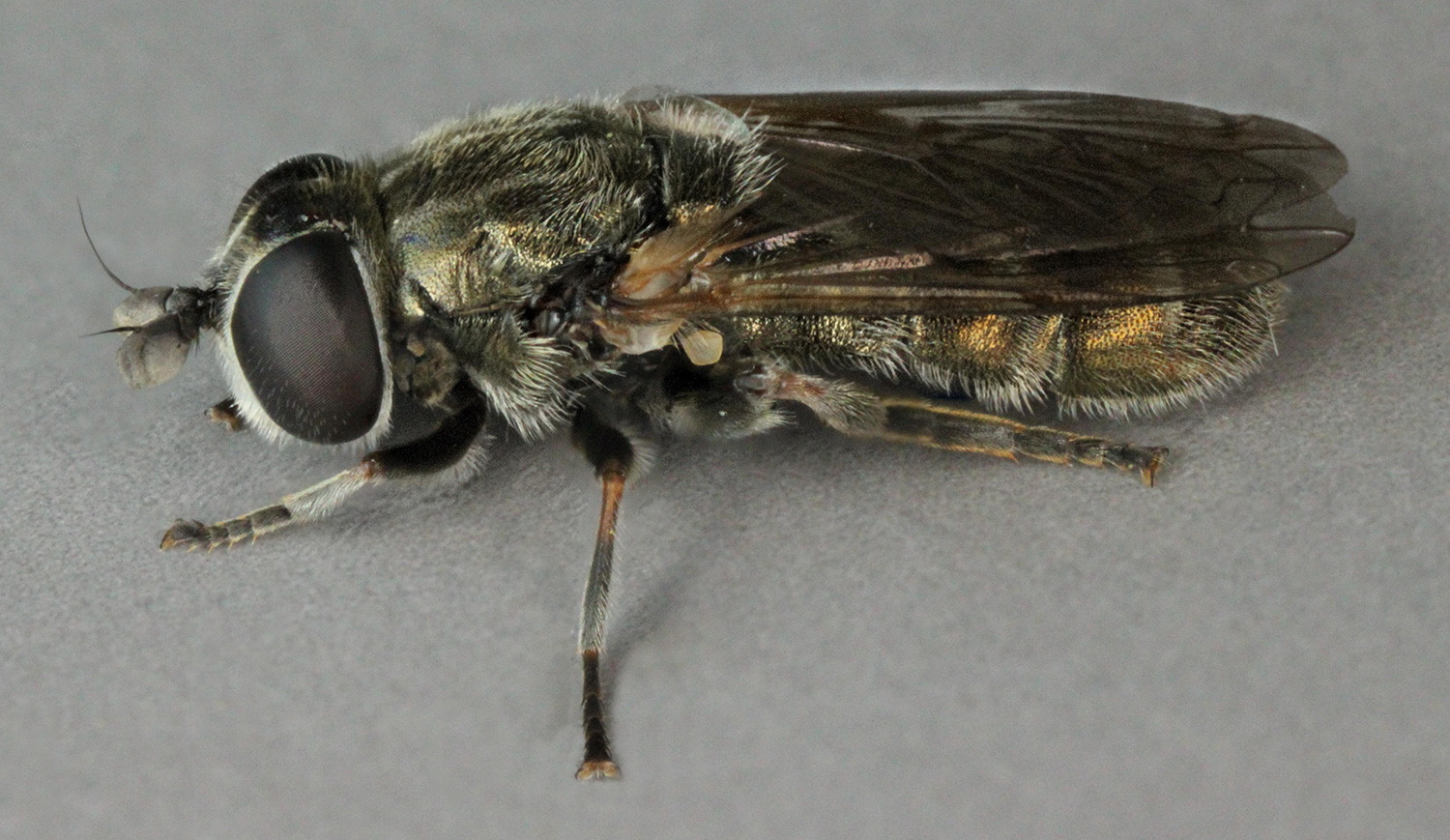
Eumerus strigatus

== Taxonomy ==
=== Species ===
- Eumerus acuticornis Sack, 1933
- Eumerus ahmadii Barkalov-Gharali, 2005
- Eumerus albifacies Keiser, 1971
- Eumerus amoenus Loew, 1848
- Eumerus angustifrons Loew, 1848
- Eumerus argyropsis Bezzi, 1908
- Eumerus argyropus Loew, 1848
- Eumerus aristatus Peck, 1969
- Eumerus armenorum Stackelberg, 1960
- Eumerus armipes Bezzi, 1915
- Eumerus assimilis Doesburg, 1955
- Eumerus astropilops Hull, 1964
- Eumerus astrovarius Speiser, 1913
- Eumerus aurifrons (Wiedemann, 1824)
- Eumerus axinecerus Speiser, 1910
- Eumerus barbarus (Coquebert, 1804)
- Eumerus basalis Loew, 1848
- Eumerus bayardi Séguy, 1961
- Eumerus bernhardi Lindner, 1969
- Eumerus bequaerti Herve-Bazin, 1913
- Eumerus bidentatus Keiser, 1971
- Eumerus breijeri Doesburg, 1955
- Eumerus brincki Hull, 1964
- Eumerus caballeroi Gil Collado, 1929
- Eumerus canariensis Báez, 1982
- Eumerus capensis (Curran, 1938)
- Eumerus claripennis Coe, 1957
- Eumerus clavatus Becker, 1923
- Eumerus coeruleus (Becker, 1913)
- Eumerus compactus Doesburg, 1966
- Eumerus connexus Hull, 1964
- Eumerus consimilis Simic & Vujic, 1996
- Eumerus discimanus Keiser, 1971
- Eumerus dolichocerus Speiser, 1915
- Eumerus dubius Báez, 1982
- Eumerus dux Violovitsh, 1981
- Eumerus efflatouni (Curran, 1938)
- Eumerus elaverensis Séguy, 1961
- Eumerus emarginatus Loew, 1848
- Eumerus erythrocerus Loew, 1858
- Eumerus etnenstttis van der Goot, 1964
- Eumerus excisus van der Goot, 1968
- Eumerus falsus Becker, 1922
- Eumerus feae Bezzi, 1912
- Eumerus figurans Walker, 1859
- Eumerus flavitarsis Zetterstedt, 1843
- Eumerus fumipennis Hull, 1964
- Eumerus funeralis Meigen, 1822
- Eumerus graecus Becker, 1921
- Eumerus grandis Meigen, 1822
- Eumerus griseus Hull, 1964
- Eumerus gussakovskii Stackelberg, 1949
- Eumerus hispanicus van der Goot, 1966
- Eumerus hungaricus Szilády, 1940
- Eumerus hypopygialis Doesburg, 1966
- Eumerus imitatus Doesburg, 1955
- Eumerus integer Bezzi, 1921
- Eumerus jacobsoni Becker, 1913
- Eumerus japonicus Matsumura, 1916
- Eumerus keizeri Hull, 1964
- Eumerus kondarensis Stackelberg, 1952
- Eumerus lasiops Rondani, 1857
- Eumerus latitarsis Macquart in Webb & Berthelot, 1839
- Eumerus longicornis Loew, 1855
- Eumerus lucidus Loew, 1848
- Eumerus lugens Wiedemann, 1930
- Eumerus lunatus (Fabricius, 1794)
- Eumerus macropygus Keiser, 1971
- Eumerus maculipennis Bezzi, 1915
- Eumerus malagasius Keiser, 1971
- Eumerus metatarsalis Doesburg, 1955
- Eumerus minotaurus Claussen & Lucas, 1988
- Eumerus muscidus Bezzi, 1921
- Eumerus narcissi Smith, 1928
- Eumerus nebrodensis Rondani, 1868
- Eumerus niehuisi Doczkal, 1996
- Eumerus niger Doesburg, 1955
- Eumerus nigroapicalis Keiser, 1971
- Eumerus nigrocoeruleus Hull, 1964
- Eumerus nivariae Báez, 1982
- Eumerus niveitibia Becker, 1921
- Eumerus nodosus Hull, 1964
- Eumerus nudus Loew, 1848
- Eumerus obliquus (Fabricius, 1805)
- Eumerus obscurus Hull, 1964
- Eumerus obtusiceps Hull, 1964
- Eumerus okinawaensis Shiraki, 1930
- Eumerus olivaceus Loew, 1848
- Eumerus ornatus Meigen, 1822
- Eumerus ovatus Loew, 1848
- Eumerus parasiticus (Séguy, 1955)
- Eumerus paulae Herve-Bazin, 1913
- Eumerus pauper Becker, 1921
- Eumerus persarum Stackelberg, 1961
- Eumerus persicus Stackelberg, 1949
- Eumerus pipizoides Speiser, 1915
- Eumerus platycheiroides Keiser, 1971
- Eumerus pulchellus Loew, 1848
- Eumerus pumilio Hull, 1964
- Eumerus purpureus Macquart in Webb & Berthelot, 1839
- Eumerus pusillus Loew, 1848
- Eumerus quadrimaculatus Macquart, 1855
- Eumerus ribidus Hull, 1964
- Eumerus richteri Stackelberg, 1960
- Eumerus rubiginosus Herve-Bazin, 1913
- Eumerus rudebecki Hull, 1964
- Eumerus ruficornis Meigen, 1822
- Eumerus rufipes Herve-Bazin, 1913
- Eumerus rusticus Sack, 1932
- Eumerus sabulonum (Fallén, 1817)
- Eumerus sakarahaensis Keiser, 1971
- Eumerus santosabreui Báez, 1982
- Eumerus scaber Bezzi, 1915
- Eumerus serratus Bezzi, 1915
- Eumerus sicilianus van der Goot, 1968
- Eumerus signatus Keiser, 1971
- Eumerus sinuatus Loew, 1855
- Eumerus sogdianus Stackelberg, 1952
- Eumerus speiseri Hull, 1964
- Eumerus spinifer Doesburg, 1955
- Eumerus strigatus (Fallén, 1817)
- Eumerus subcaeruleus Keiser, 1971
- Eumerus sudanus (Curran, 1938)
- Eumerus sulcitibius Rondani, 1868
- Eumerus tadzhicorum Stackelberg, 1949
- Eumerus tarsalis Loew, 1848
- Eumerus tauricus Stackelberg, 1952
- Eumerus terminalis Santos Abréu, 1924
- Eumerus tessellatus Hull, 1964
- Eumerus toamasinaensis Keiser, 1971
- Eumerus triangularis Herve-Bazin, 1913
- Eumerus tricolor (Fabricius, 1798)
- Eumerus tridentatus Keiser, 1971
- Eumerus tumidipes Doesburg, 1966
- Eumerus tuberculatus Rondani, 1857
- Eumerus uncipes Rondani, 1850
- Eumerus unicolor Loew, 1858
- Eumerus vandenberghei Doczkal, 1996
- Eumerus vansoni Doesburg, 1955
- Eumerus varipennis (Curran, 1938)
- Eumerus vestitus Bezzi, 1912
- Eumerus villeneuvei Herve-Bazin, 1913
- Eumerus wainwrighti (Curran, 1938)
