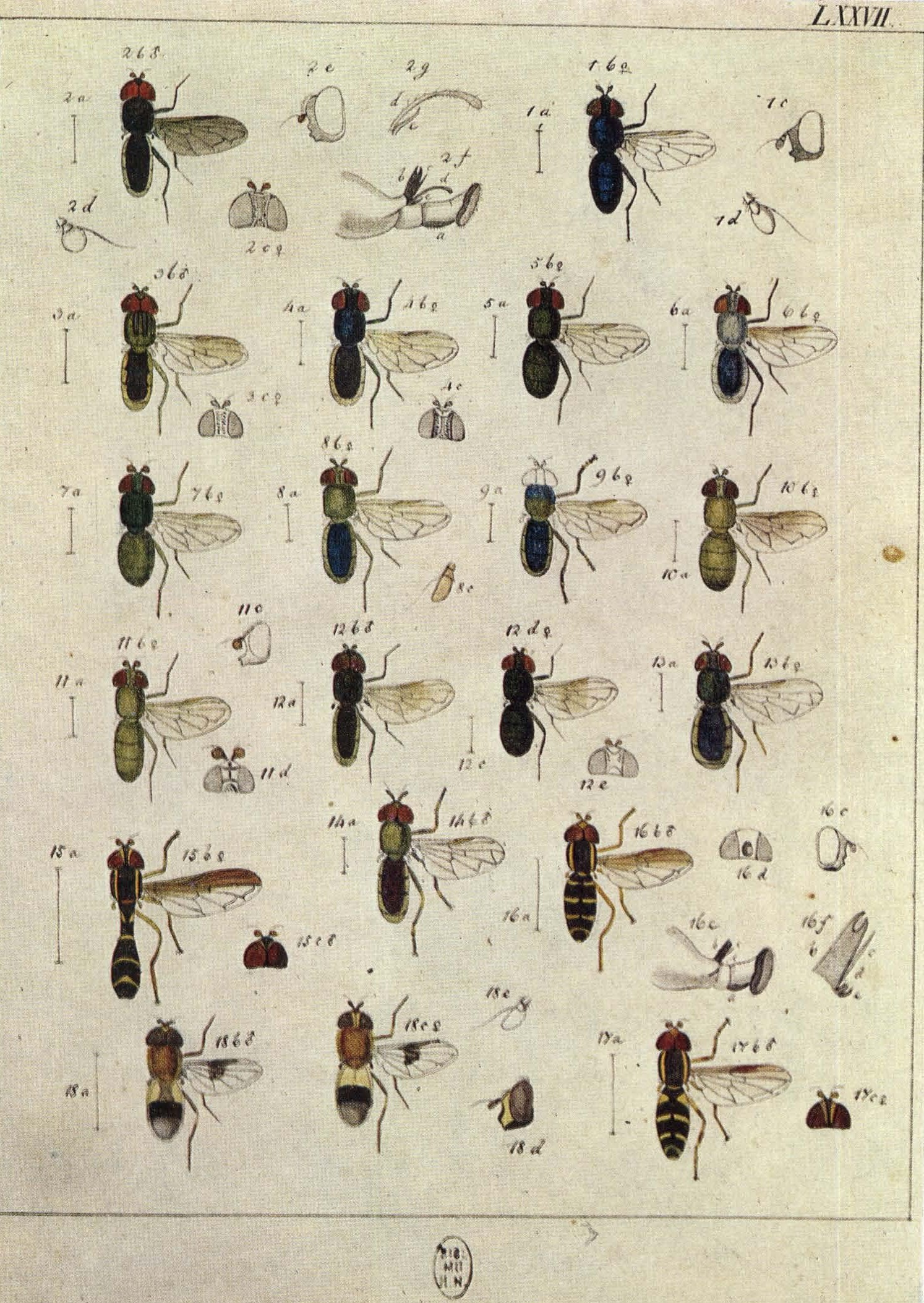
- Psilota anthracina Figure 1 in Meigen Europäischen Zweiflügeligen

Scientific classification
- Kingdom: Animalia
- Phylum: Arthropoda
- Clade: Pancrustacea
- Class: Insecta
- Order: Diptera
- Family: Syrphidae
- Subfamily: Eristalinae
- Tribe: Merodontini
- Genus: Psilota; Meigen, 1822

= Psilota =

Genus of flies

Psilota is a genus of small black hoverflies with long wings, from the family Syrphidae, in the order Diptera. They are one of the few hoverfly genera that do not have a vena spuria in the wings. The larvae feed on tree sap.

== Systematics ==
Extant species:

- Psilota aegeae Vujic, Stahls & Smit, 2020
- Psilota aislinnae Young, 2020
- Psilota alexanderi Young, 2020
- Psilota anthracina Meigen, 1822
- Psilota atra (Fallén, 1817)
- Psilota auricauda Curran, 1926
- Psilota auripila Young & Steenis, 2020
- Psilota azurea Thompson & Young
- Psilota basalis (Walker, 1858)
- Psilota bicolor Young, 2020
- Psilota bifenestrata Meijere, 1933
- Psilota brevicornis Shiraki, 1968
- Psilota brunnipennis Young, 2020
- Psilota buccata (Macquart, 1842)
- Psilota calva Young, 2020
- Psilota coerulea Macquart, 1846
- Psilota cuprea (Macquart, 1850)
- Psilota darwini Young, 2020
- Psilota decessum (Hutton, 1901)
- Psilota dichoptica Thompson, 2013
- Psilota erythrogaster Curran, 1926
- Psilota exilistyla Smit & Vujić, 2008
- Psilota fasciata Curran, 1929
- Psilota femoralis Schiner, 1868
- Psilota flavidipennis Macquart, 1855
- Psilota flavoorta Young & Steenis, 2020
- Psilota fuscifrons Young, 2020
- Psilota hirta Klöcker, 1924
- Psilota innupta Rondani, 1857
- Psilota klymkoi Locke, Young & Skevington, 2019
- Psilota kroshka Mutin, 1999
- Psilota livida Young & Steenis, 2020
- Psilota longipila Thompson & Young
- Psilota mcqueeni Young, 2020
- Psilota metallica Thompson & Young
- Psilota nana Smit & Vujić, 2008
- Psilota nigripila Young, 2020
- Psilota nigripilosa Shiraki, 1968
- Psilota nitida (Macquart,1850)
- Psilota occidua Young, 2020
- Psilota pollinosa Young & Steenis, 2020
- Psilota purpurea Thompson & Young
- Psilota queenslandica (Klöcker,1924)
- Psilota rubra Klöcker,1924
- Psilota rubriventris (Bigot,1885)
- Psilota shannoni Goot,1964
- Psilota shewelli Thompson, 2012
- Psilota smaragdina Young, 2020
- Psilota solata Young & Steenis, 2020
- Psilota spathistylata Young & Steenis, 2020
- Psilota spinifemur Young, 2020
- Psilota tabidosa Scudder, 1890
- Psilota tectonae Meijere, 1933
- Psilota thatuna Shannon, 1922
- Psilota tristis Klöcker, 1924
- Psilota victoria Curran, 1925
- Psilota viridescens Young & Steenis, 2020
- Psilota viridis Macquart, 1847
- Psilota xanthostoma Young, 2020
- Psilota zophos Young, 2020
