= Megatrigon =

Scientific classification
- Kingdom: Animalia
- Phylum: Arthropoda
- Clade: Pancrustacea
- Class: Insecta
- Order: Diptera
- Family: Syrphidae
- Subfamily: Eristalinae
- Tribe: Merodontini
- Genus: Megatrigon; Johnson, 1898

Type species
- Megatrigon sexfasciatus Johnson, 1898

Genus of flies

Megatrigon is a genus of hoverflies (family Syrphidae) within the tribe Merodontini.

== Species ==
- M. apiformis Doczkal, Radenković, Lyneborg & Pape, 2016
- M. argenteus (Walker, 1852)
- M. argentifrons Doczkal, Radenković, Lyneborg & Pape, 2016
- M. argentimaculatus Doczkal, Radenković, Lyneborg & Pape, 2016
- M. cooksoni Doczkal, Radenković, Lyneborg & Pape, 2016
- M. flavimarginatus (Hull, 1964)
- M. immaculatus Doczkal, Radenković, Lyneborg & Pape, 2016
- M. jacobi (Herve-Bazin, 1913)
- M. magnicornis Doczkal, Radenković, Lyneborg & Pape, 2016
- M. natalensis Doczkal, Radenković, Lyneborg & Pape, 2016
- M. nivalis (Hull, 1964)
- M. ochreatus (Hull, 1964)
- M. sexfasciatus Johnson, 1898
- M. sexmaculatus Doczkal, Radenković, Lyneborg & Pape, 2016
- M. tabanoides Doczkal, Radenković, Lyneborg & Pape, 2016
