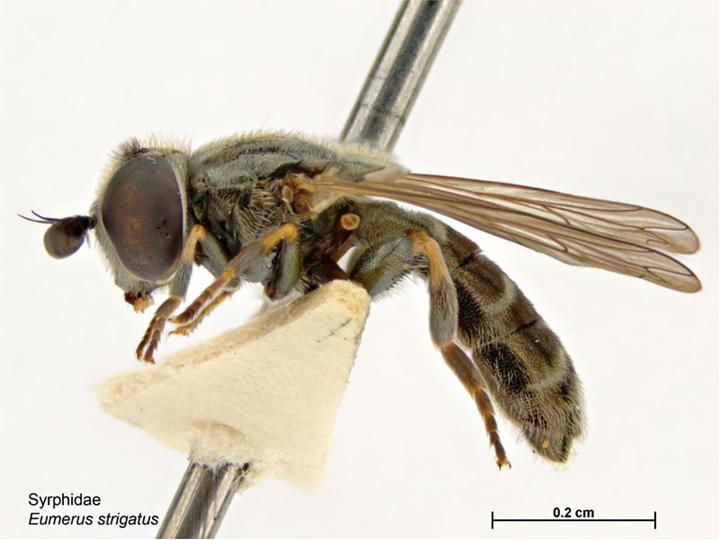

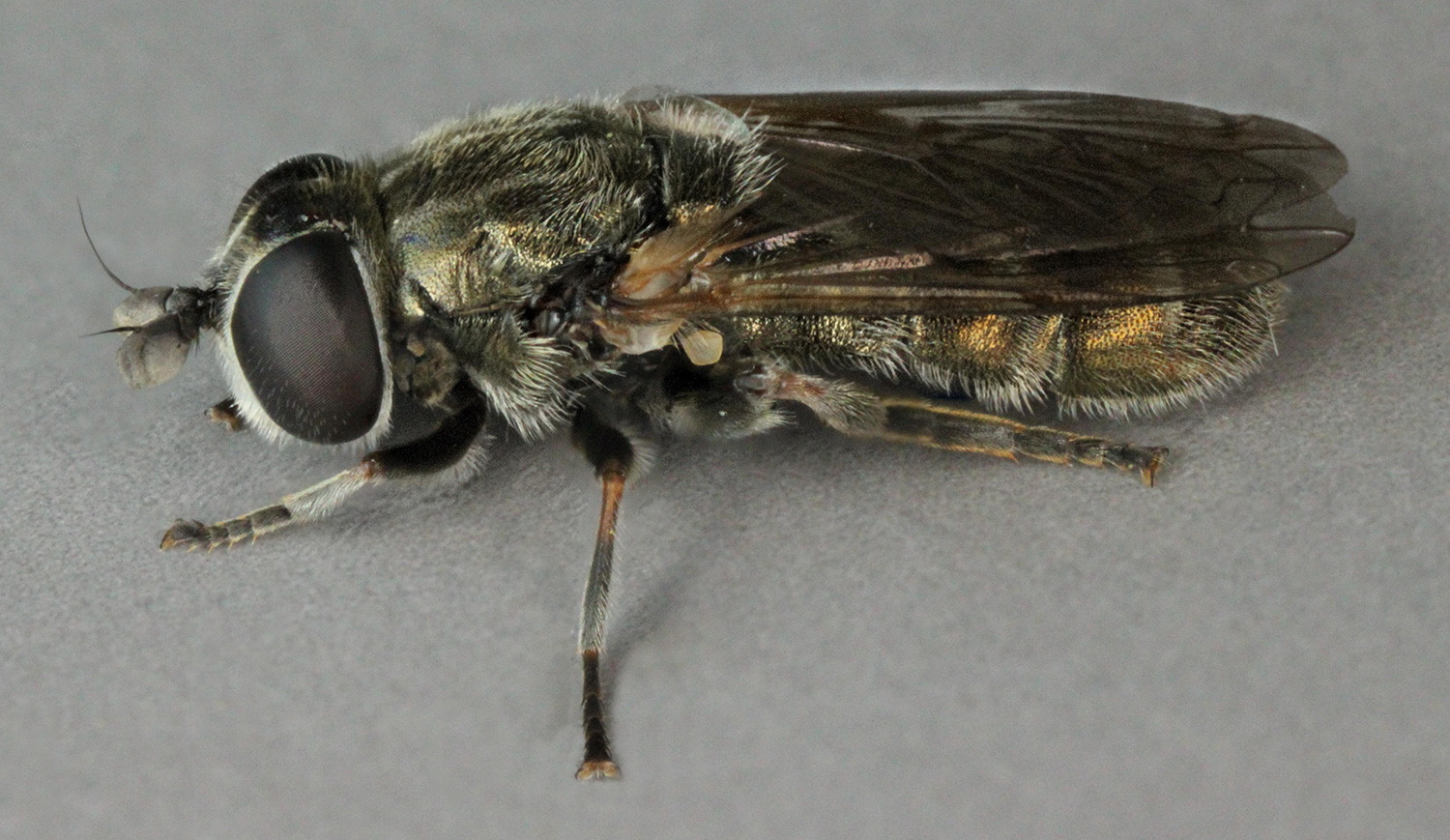

Scientific classification
- Kingdom: Animalia
- Phylum: Arthropoda
- Clade: Pancrustacea
- Class: Insecta
- Order: Diptera
- Family: Syrphidae
- Genus: Eumerus
- Species: E. strigatus

Binomial name
- Eumerus strigatus (Fallén, 1817)

Synonyms
- Pipiza strigatus Fallén, 1817; Eumerus aeneus Macquart, 1829

= Eumerus strigatus =

Species of fly

Eumerus strigatus, the onion bulb fly, is a fairly common species of syrphid fly observed across Europe. Also found in north-central North America and other scattered locations as an introduced species from infested bulbs. Syrphid flies are also known as hover flies or flower flies because the adults are frequently found hovering around flowers from which they feed on nectar and pollen. The larvae feed on various bulbs.

== Description ==
External images For terms, see: Morphology of Diptera.

Wing length: 4–6.25 mm (0.157–0.246 in). Stigma are yellowish or light brown. Femora 3 is simple. Tergites are blackish, absolutely without reddish-brown markings. Male ocelli are in an equilateral triangle. Male genitalia figured by Van Veen (2004). The larva is described and figured by Heiss (1938).

== Distribution ==
Palaearctic, Fennoscandia South to Iberia and the Mediterranean basin, Ireland east through Europe into Turkey and Russia. Also, from the Urals to the Pacific coast (Sakhalin) and Japan. Introduced to the Nearctic and Australia and New Zealand.

== Biology ==
The habitat is wetlands, deciduous woodland, open ground, seasonally-flooded grassland, and open, dry unimproved pasture, including dune grassland. Also in horticultural land and suburban gardens. In dry grassland often settles on the ground, on stones etc. Flowers visited include umbellifers, Allium ursinum, Convolvulus, Eschscholzia californica, Euphorbia, Fragaria, Leontodon, Papaver, Potentilla erecta, Ranunculus, Sonchus arvensis, Taraxacum. The flight period is May to September. A bulb feeder. It is a minor pest of Liliaceae, parsnip, carrot, potato, asparagus, artichoke roots (Cynara scolymus).
