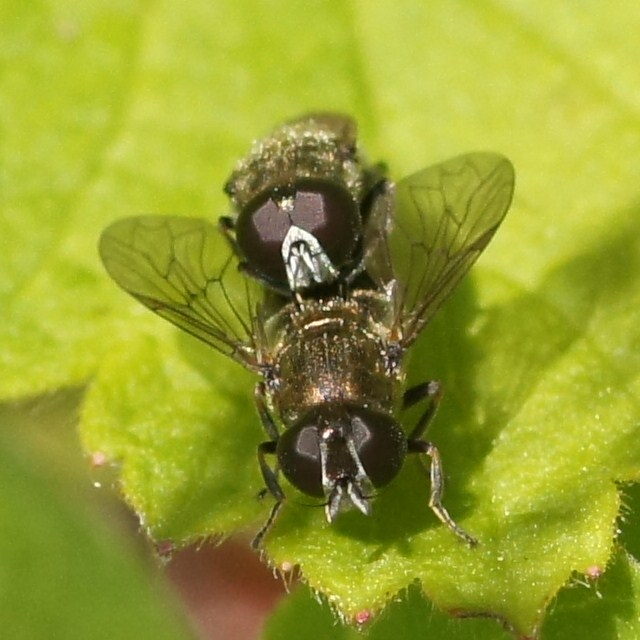
- Mating pair

Scientific classification
- Kingdom: Animalia
- Phylum: Arthropoda
- Clade: Pancrustacea
- Class: Insecta
- Order: Diptera
- Family: Syrphidae
- Genus: Eumerus
- Species: E. funeralis

Binomial name
- Eumerus funeralis Meigen, 1822

Synonyms
- Eumerus tuberculatus Rondani, 1857

= Eumerus funeralis =

Species of fly

Eumerus funeralis or lesser bulb fly is a species of Hoverfly, from the family Syrphidae, in the order Diptera. E. funeralis appears in Peck (1988) as a synonym of E. strigatus (Fallen), but was reinstated as the correct name for tuberculatus Rondani, sensu auctorum by Speight et al. (1998).

== Description ==
External images For terms, see: Morphology of Diptera.

Wing length: 3.5–6 mm (0.14–0.24 in). Stigma are dark brown blackish. Femur 3 has a small ventral process at the base and apical to this projection a bare, shiny area. Female has frons with a large and squarish shiny area occupying its entire width except for the narrow white dust strips against the eye. Tergites are blackish, no red-brown markings. Van Veen, M. (2004) figures the male genitalia. The larva is illustrated by Rotheray (1993)

== Distribution ==
Originated in the Mediterranean basin, but becoming cosmopolitan, especially in the Palaearctic and Nearctic.

== Biology ==
The habitat is open ground, dry grassland and clearings in dry woodland. Occurs also in suburban gardens and land used for horticulture. Flowers visited include Euphorbia, Fragaria, Leucanthemum, Ranunculus. The flight period is April to September, with peaks in June and August. The larva is phytophagous, feeding in damaged bulbs. Minor pest of Amaryllis, Hyacinthus and Narcissus.
