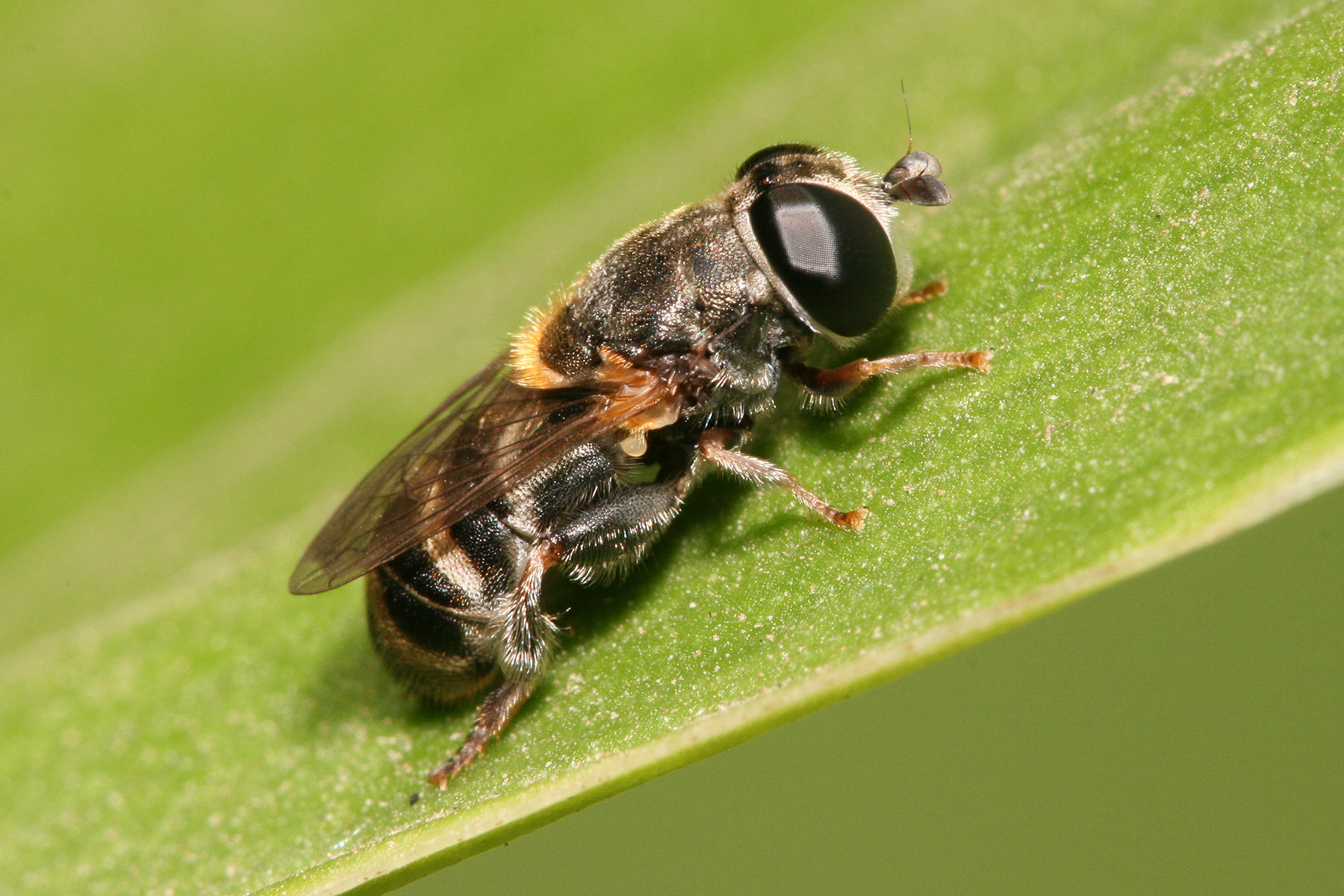
- Eumerus feae (female)

Scientific classification
- Kingdom: Animalia
- Phylum: Arthropoda
- Clade: Pancrustacea
- Class: Insecta
- Order: Diptera
- Family: Syrphidae
- Subfamily: Eristalinae
- Tribe: Merodontini; Edwards, 1915

Genera
- See text

Synonyms
- Eumerini

= Merodontini =

Tribe of flies

Merodontini is a tribe of hoverflies. The breeding habits of this group varies: larvae of the genera Merodon and Eumerus tunnel into plant bulbs while larvae of Psilota have been found in sap runs.

== List of genera ==
Genera accepted by Catalogue of Life:

- Alipumilio Shannon, 1927
- Amphoterus Bezzi, 1915
- Azpeytia Walker, 1865
- Cepa Thompson & Vockeroth in Thompson, 2007
- Eumerus Meigen, 1822
- †Intricodon Nidergas, Hadrava, Coster & Nel, 2025
- Megatrigon Johnson, 1898
- Merodon Meigen, 1803
- Nausigaster Shannon, 1921
- Platynochaetus Wiedemann, 1830
- Psilota Meigen, 1822
