= Frilford Heath, Ponds and Fens =

Protected area in Oxfordshire, England

Coordinates: 51.682°N 1.364°W

- Site of Special Scientific Interest
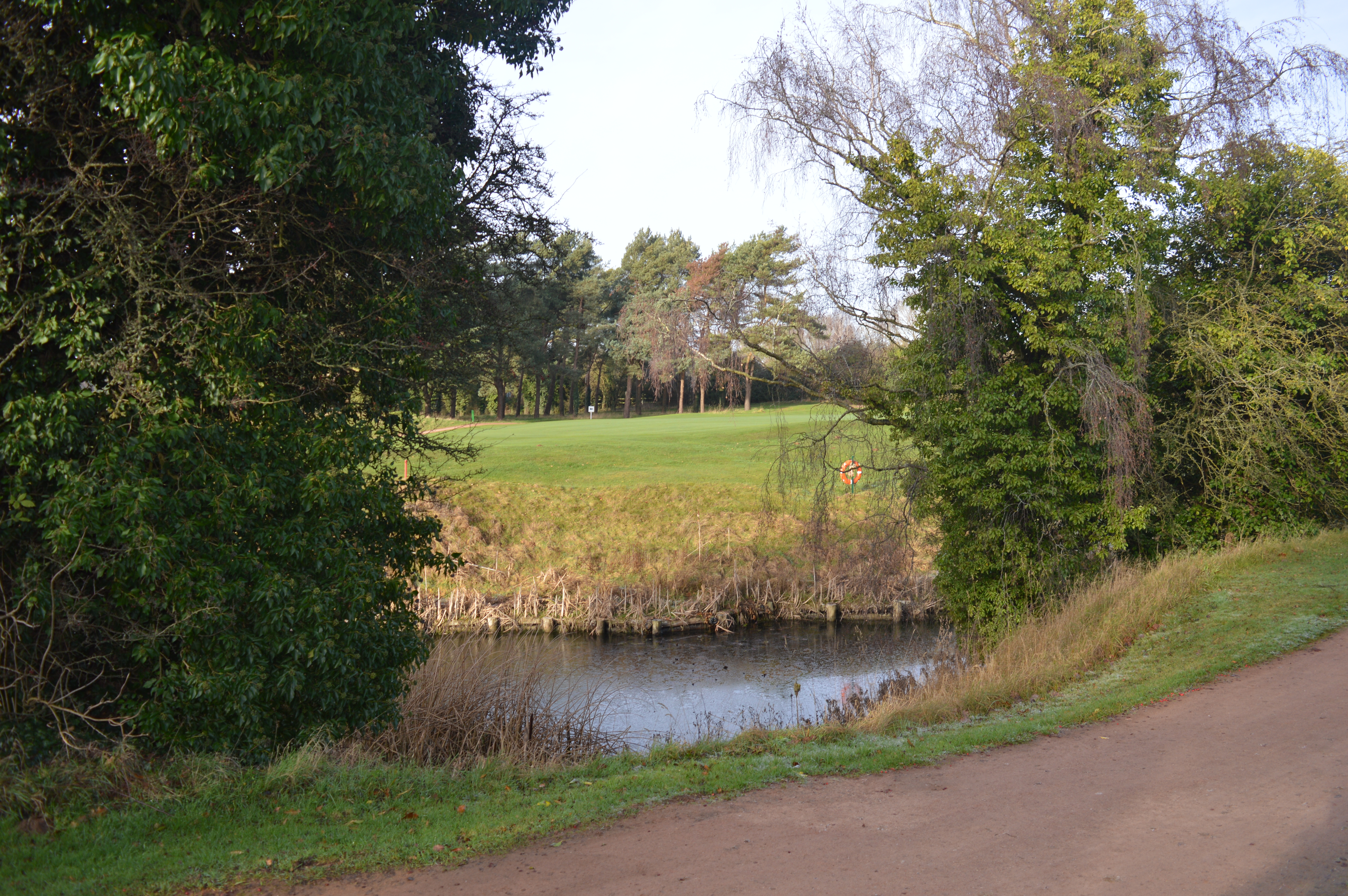
- Location of Frilford Heath, Ponds and Fens.
- Area of search: Oxfordshire
- Grid reference: SU 441 983
- Interest: Biological
- Area: 108.8 hectares (269 acres)
- Notification date: 1986
- Location map: Magic Map

Frilford Heath, Ponds and Fens is a 108.8-hectare (269-acre) biological Site of Special Scientific Interest in Frilford, west of Abingdon in Oxfordshire. An area of 3 hectares (7.4 acres), separate from the main site is Hitchcopse Pit, a nature reserve managed by the Berkshire, Buckinghamshire and Oxfordshire Wildlife Trust.

Natural England describes the acid grassland, heathland and valley fens of this site as unique in southern England. Over 400 vascular plants have been recorded, including some which are nationally rare. There are unusual insects such as the wasp Microdynerus exilis, which was only recognised as native to Britain in the late twentieth century, the red data book of threatened species fly Cheilosia mutabilis, and the nationally uncommon Epistrophe diaphana.

There is no public access the main site, which is almost all on Frilford Heath Golf Course, but Hitchcopse Pit is open to the public.
