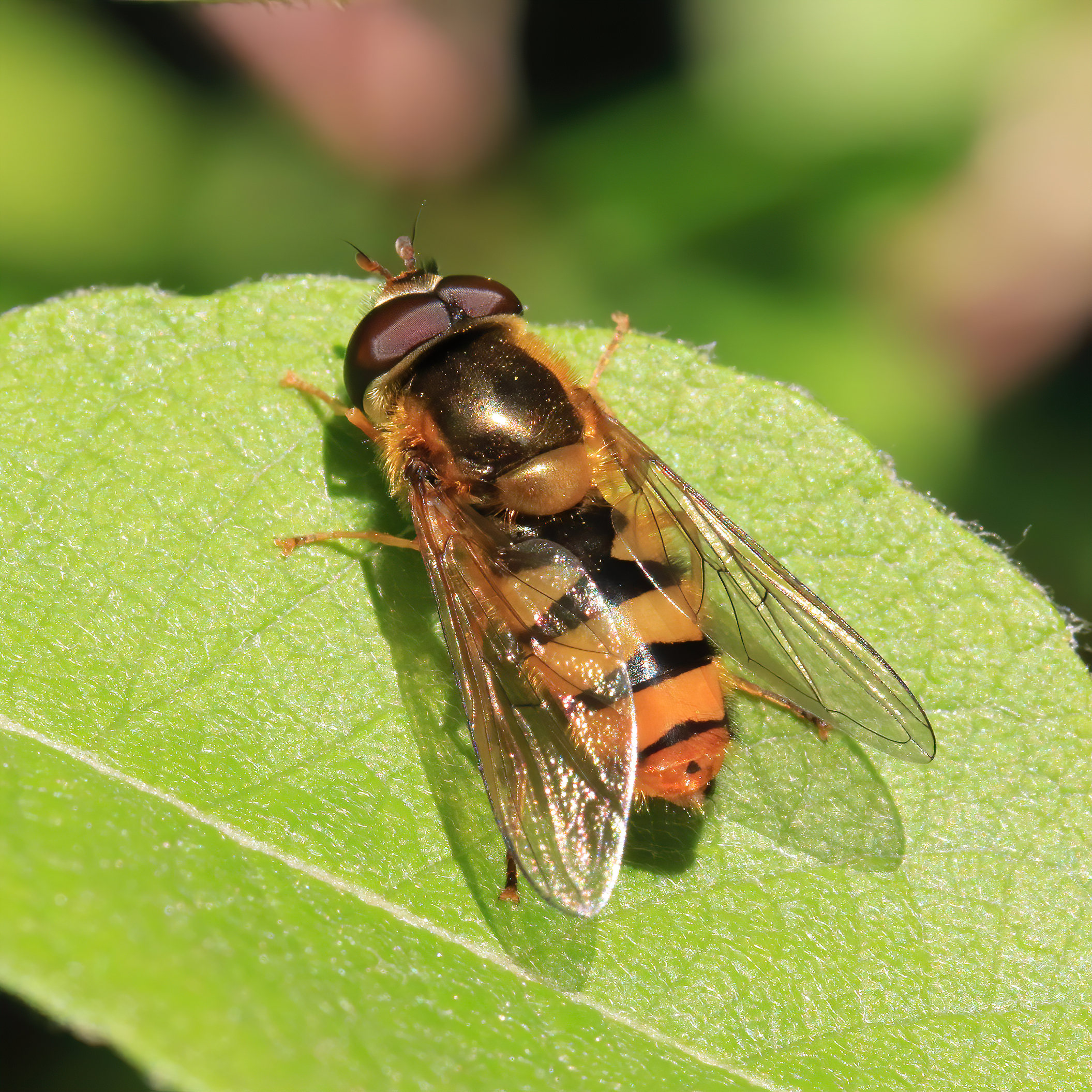
- male

Scientific classification
- Kingdom: Animalia
- Phylum: Arthropoda
- Class: Insecta
- Order: Diptera
- Family: Syrphidae
- Genus: Epistrophe
- Species: E. melanostoma

Binomial name
- Epistrophe melanostoma (Zetterstedt, 1843)

Synonyms
- Scaeva melanostoma Zetterstedt, 1843

= Epistrophe melanostoma =

Species of fly

Epistrophe melanostoma is a European species of hoverfly.
