= Epistrophe xanthostoma =

Scientific classification
- Kingdom: Animalia
- Phylum: Arthropoda
- Class: Insecta
- Order: Diptera
- Family: Syrphidae
- Genus: Epistrophe
- Species: E. xanthostoma

Binomial name
- Epistrophe xanthostoma (Williston, 1887)

Synonyms
- Syrphus xanthostoma Williston, 1887

Species of fly

Epistrophe xanthostoma is a species of syrphid fly in the family Syrphidae.
