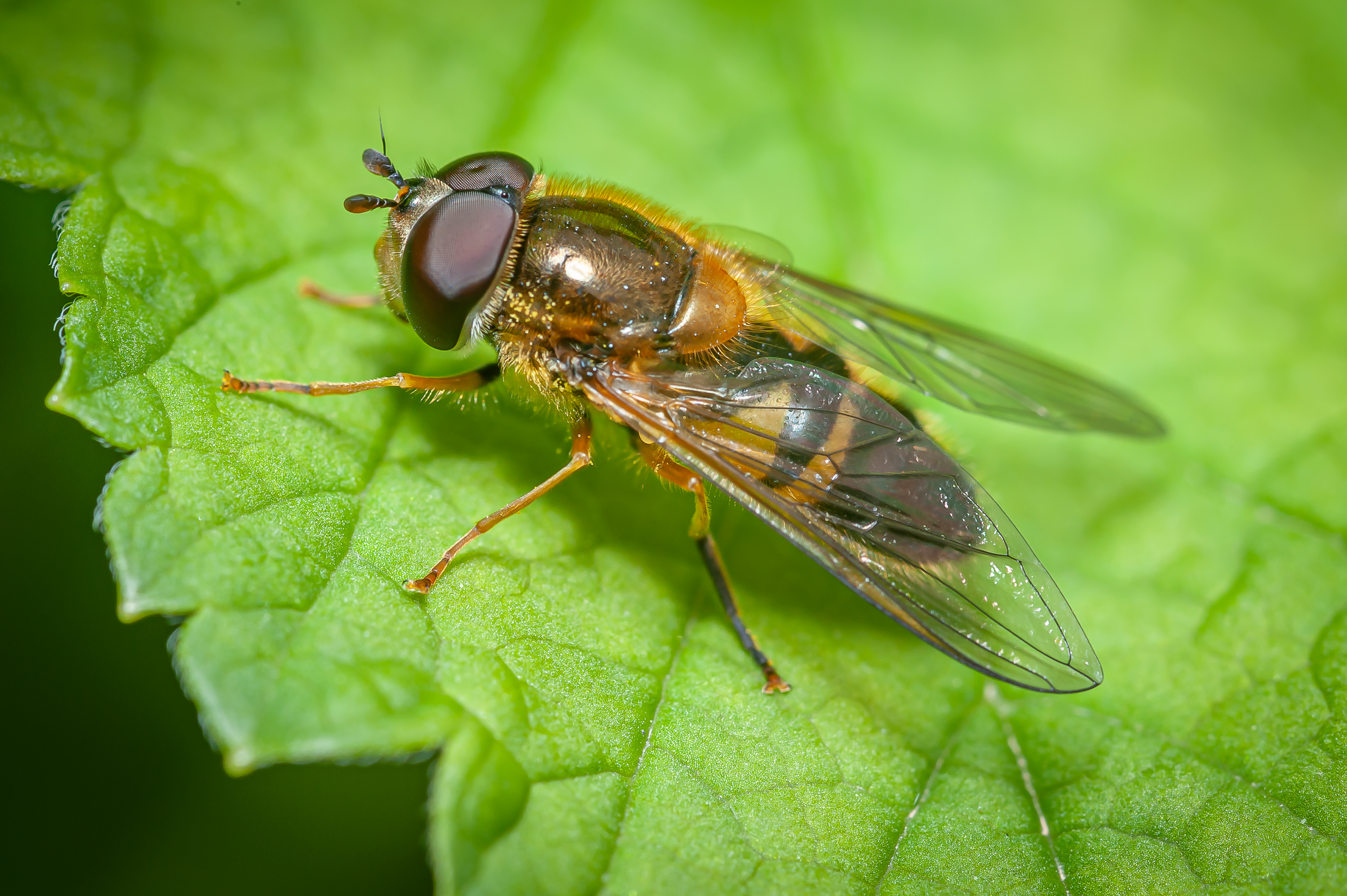
- male
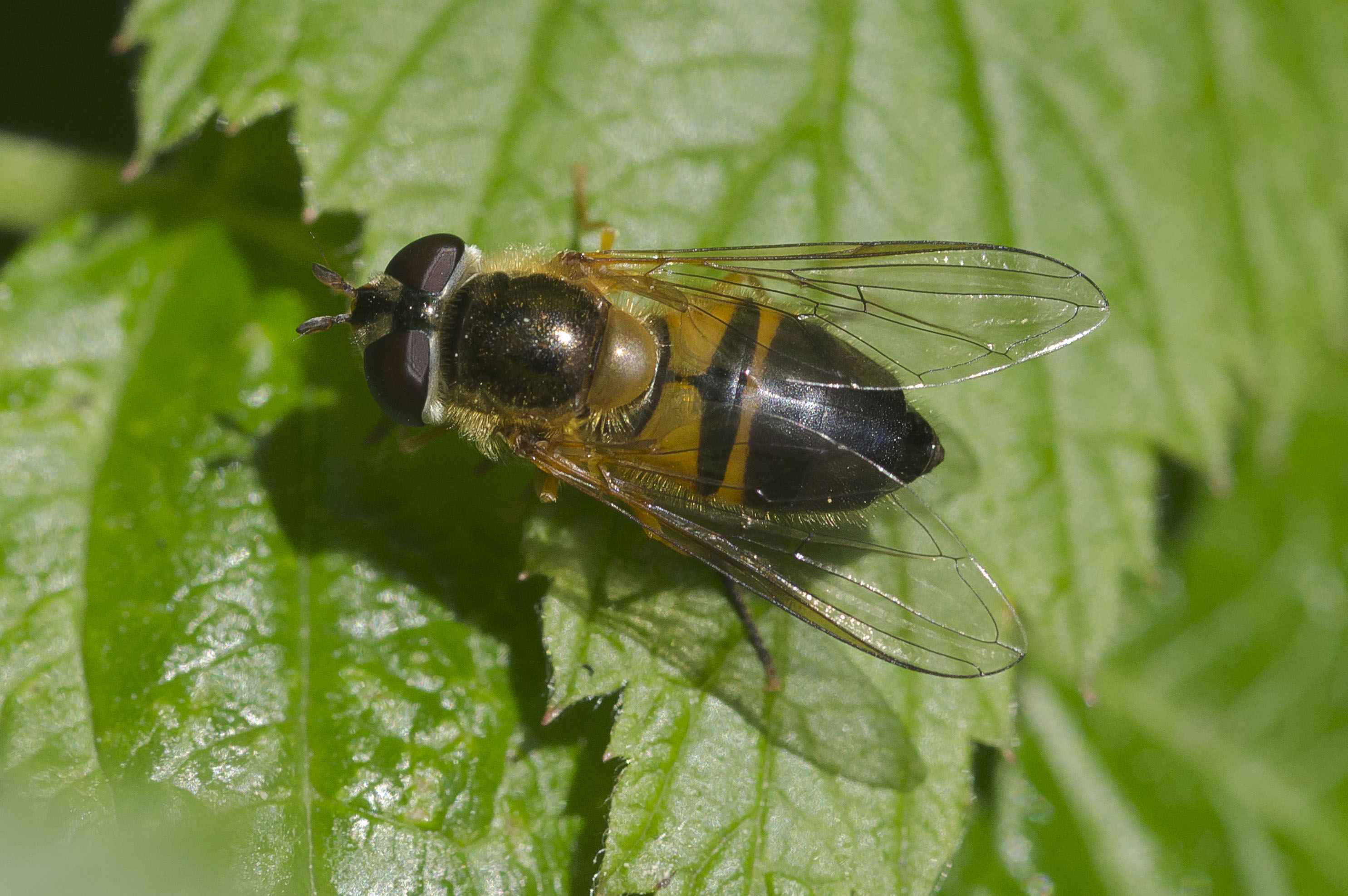
- female

Scientific classification
- Kingdom: Animalia
- Phylum: Arthropoda
- Class: Insecta
- Order: Diptera
- Family: Syrphidae
- Genus: Epistrophe
- Species: E. eligans

Binomial name
- Epistrophe eligans (Harris, 1780)

Synonyms
- Epistrophe bifasciatus (Fabricius, 1794); Musca eligans Harris, 1780; Syrphus bifasciatus Fabricius, 1794

= Epistrophe eligans =

Species of fly

Epistrophe eligans is a European species of hoverfly.

== Description ==
External images For terms see Morphology of Diptera
Wing length 6·25-9·5 mm. Eyes bare. Stigma pale yellow. Tergite 4 with smaller yellow markings than tergite 3 or tergite 4 black. The larva is illustrated by Rotheray (1993) The male genitalia are figured by Dusek and Laska (1967).

== Distribution ==
Palaearctic. South Sweden to Iberia. Ireland East through Central and South Europe into Turkey and European Russia as far as the Caucasus.

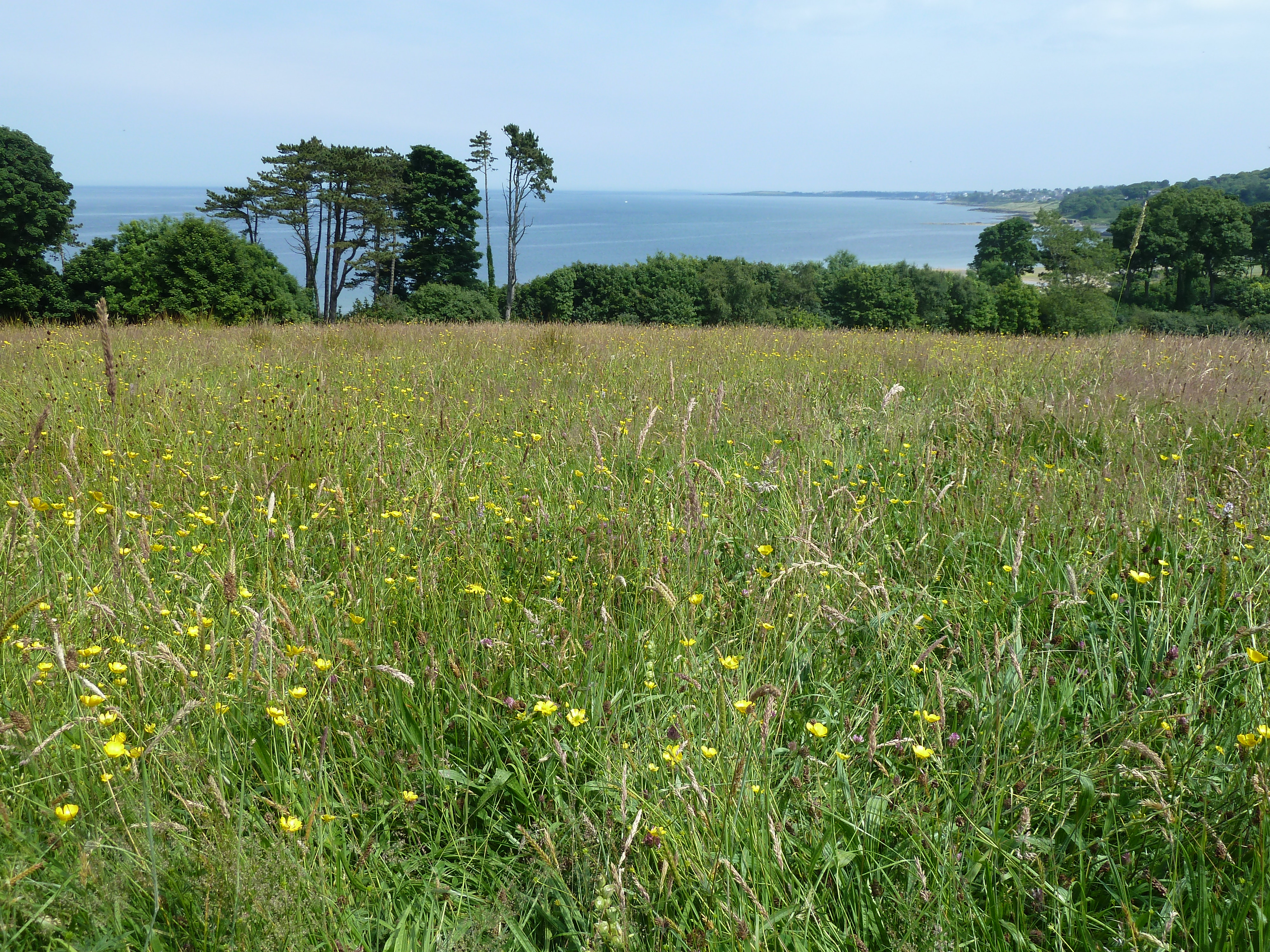
Habitat.Ireland

== Biology ==
The habitat is deciduous woodland and scrub, suburban gardens, parks. Found by tracksides, clearings. Flowers visited include white umbellifers, Acer pseudoplatanus, Cistus, Crataegus, Endymion, Euonymus, Euphorbia, Ilex, Prunus spinosa, Stellaria, Viburnum opulus. The flight period is April to June (earlier in southern areas, later at higher altitudes and northerly latitudes). The larva is aphid feeding on shrubs and trees.
