= Epistrophe ochrostoma =

Scientific classification
- Kingdom: Animalia
- Phylum: Arthropoda
- Class: Insecta
- Order: Diptera
- Family: Syrphidae
- Genus: Epistrophe
- Species: E. ochrostoma

Binomial name
- Epistrophe ochrostoma (Zetterstedt, 1849)

Synonyms
- Scaeva ochrostoma Zetterstedt, 1849

Species of fly

Epistrophe ochrostoma is a European species of hoverfly.
