= Hitchcopse Pit =

Nature reserve in Oxfordshire, England

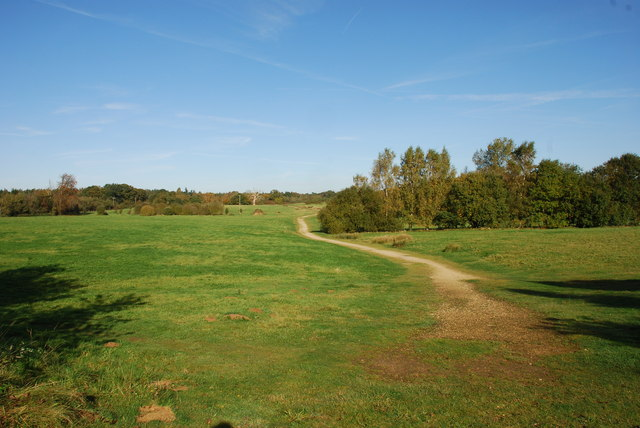
- Interactive map of Hitchcopse Pit
- Type: Nature reserve
- Location: Abingdon-on-Thames, Oxfordshire, England
- OS grid: SU452995
- Area: 3 hectares (7.4 acres)
- Manager: Berkshire, Buckinghamshire and Oxfordshire Wildlife Trust

Hitchcopse Pit is a 3-hectare (7.4-acre) nature reserve northwest of Abingdon-on-Thames in Oxfordshire, England. It is managed by the Berkshire, Buckinghamshire and Oxfordshire Wildlife Trust. It is part of Frilford Heath, Ponds and Fens, which is a Site of Special Scientific Interest.

This former sand quarry has heath, woodland, scrub, grassland and a pond. There are many solitary bees and wasps, which create burrows in the soft sand walls of the quarry. The ground has many lichens and grassland plants, and there are scattered boulders which are covered with mosses.
