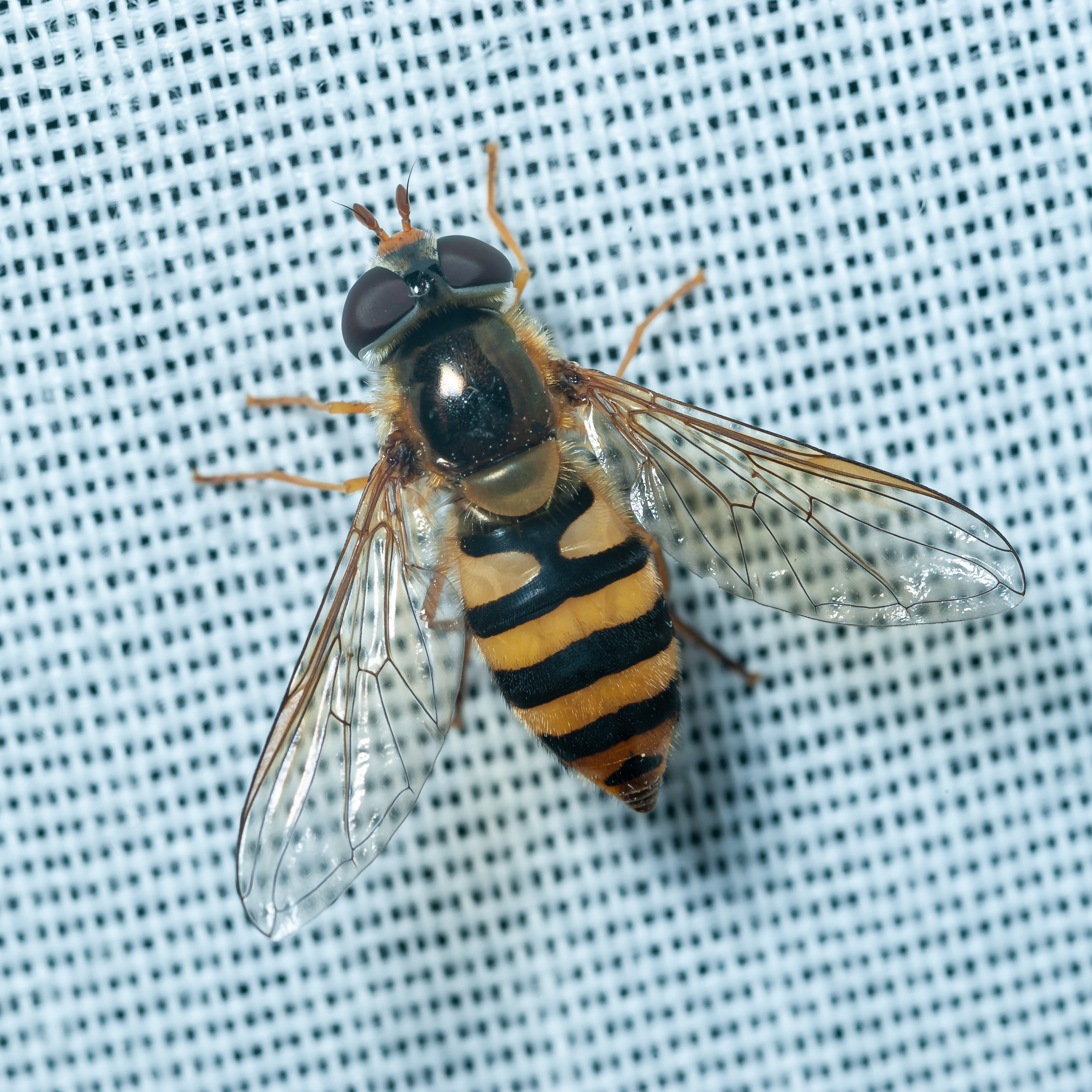
- female

Scientific classification
- Kingdom: Animalia
- Phylum: Arthropoda
- Class: Insecta
- Order: Diptera
- Family: Syrphidae
- Genus: Epistrophe
- Species: E. nitidicollis

Binomial name
- Epistrophe nitidicollis (Meigen, 1822)

Synonyms
- Syrphus nitidicollis Meigen, 1822

= Epistrophe nitidicollis =

Species of fly

Epistrophe nitidicollis is a European and North American species of hoverfly.

== Description ==
External images For terms see Morphology of Diptera
Wing length 8-11·25 mm. Face wide, clear yellow, lightly dusted at eye margin. Legs yellow except dark coxae. Thorax blackish and shiny and tergites equally black and yellow. Similar to E. melanostoma but slightly narrower, tergite 5 with black band and scutellum black-haired. The male genitalia are figured by Hippa (1968). The larva is described and figured by Dusek and Laska(1959) .

== Distribution ==
Palaearctic and Nearctic. Fennoscandia South to Iberia. Ireland East through North, Central and South Europe East into Russia then Siberia to the Pacific coast (Kamchatka, Sakhalin Island). North America from Alaska south to California and South Carolina.

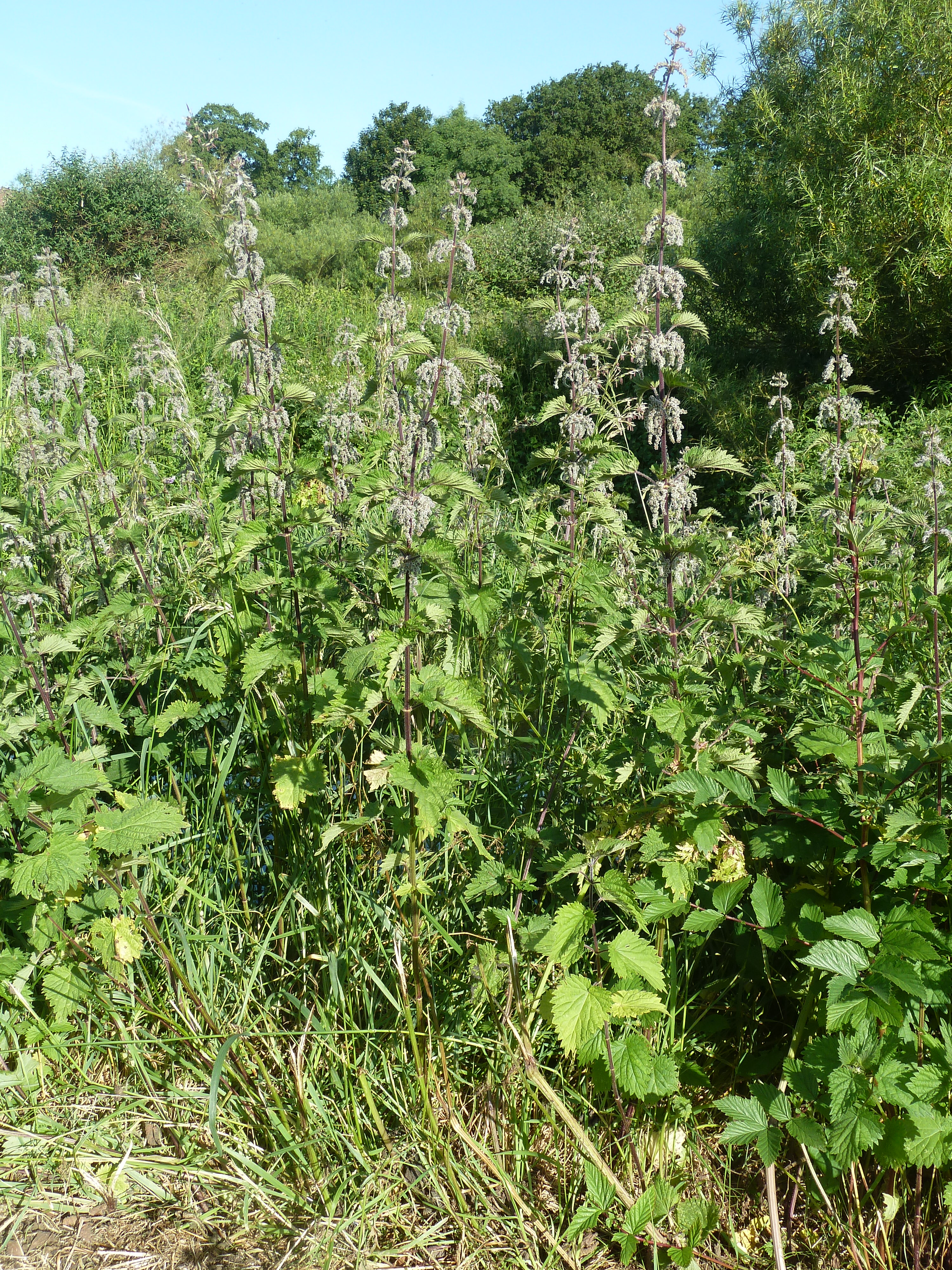
Habitat.Ireland

== Biology ==
Habitat is deciduous forest, scrub and maquis. Arboreal, descending to visit flowers of white umbellifers, Caltha, Cistus, Euphorbia, Prunus, Ranunculus, Rubus, Taraxacum. The flight period is May to June (earlier in southern Europe, later at higher altitudes and northerly latitudes). The larva feeds on aphids.
