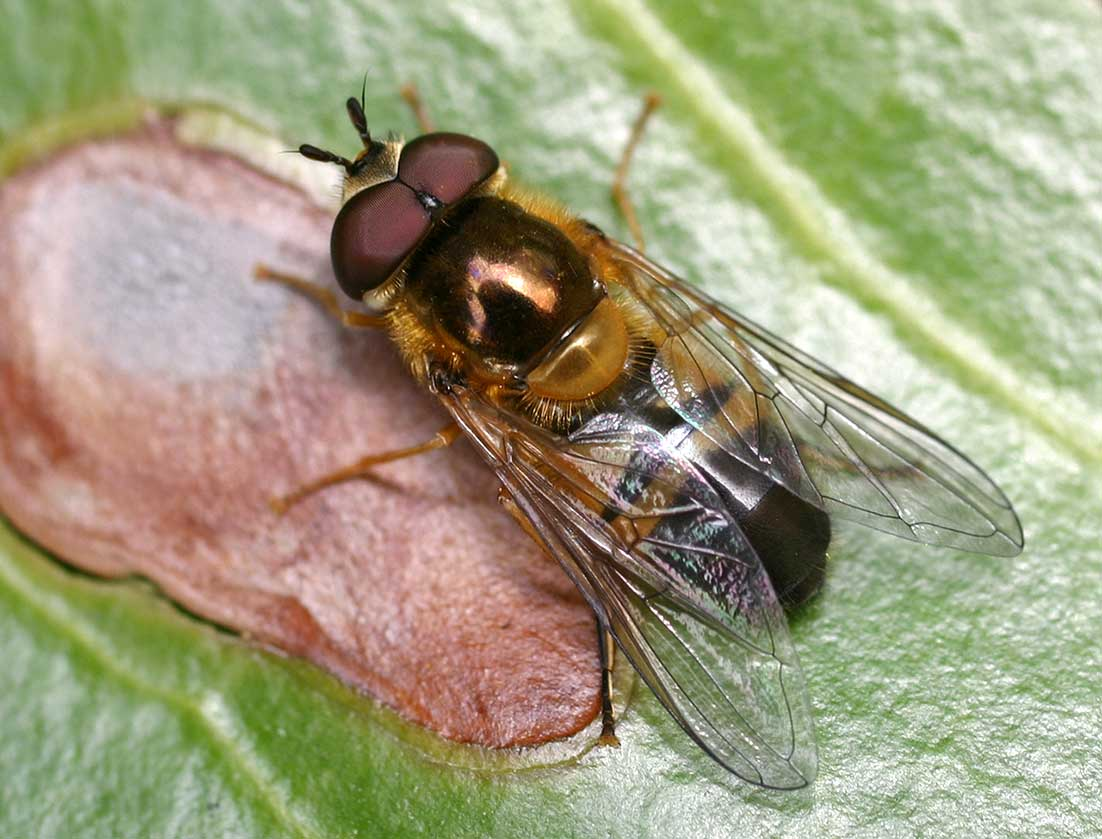
- Epistrophe eligans male

Scientific classification
- Kingdom: Animalia
- Phylum: Arthropoda
- Clade: Pancrustacea
- Class: Insecta
- Order: Diptera
- Family: Syrphidae
- Tribe: Syrphini
- Genus: Epistrophe; Walker, 1852

Subgenus
- Epistrophe Walker, 1852

= Epistrophe (fly) =

Genus of flies

Epistrophe is a genus of flies in the family Syrphidae, the hoverflies or flower flies.

These are medium-sized flies that live in forest habitat, where they occur on forest edges and in openings. The larvae are usually flat and green, blending in with foliage. The larvae are often predators of aphids, and adult females may lay their eggs in aphid colonies to provide the larvae with a food source. After an eight-day larval stage the juvenile fly enters diapause and then pupates the following spring.

== Species ==
There are nearly 75 species in the genus. Species include:

- Epistrophe annulitarsis (Stackelberg, 1918)
- Epistrophe cryptica Doczkal & Schmid, 1994
- Epistrophe diaphana (Zetterstedt, 1843)
- Epistrophe eligans (Harris, 1780)
- Epistrophe flava Doczkal & Schmid, 1994
- Epistrophe grossulariae (Meigen, 1822)
- Epistrophe leiophthalma (Schiner & Egger, 1853)
- Epistrophe melanostoma (Zetterstedt, 1843)
- Epistrophe metcalfi (Fluke, 1933)
- Epistrophe nitidicollis (Meigen, 1822)
- Epistrophe obscuripes (Strobl, 1910)
- Epistrophe ochrostoma (Zetterstedt, 1849)
- Epistrophe terminalis (Curran, 1925)
- Epistrophe xanthostoma (Williston, 1887)
