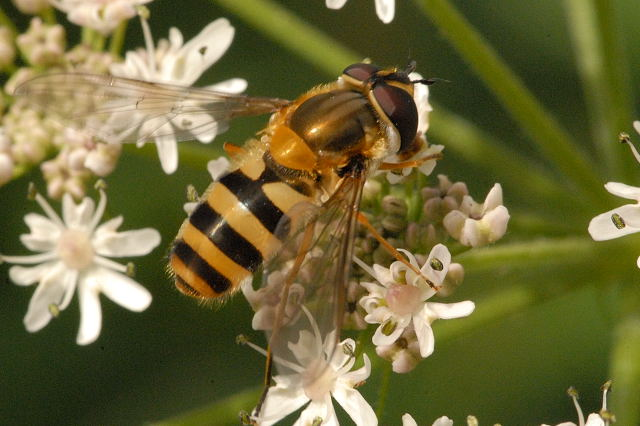
- Female Epistrophe grossulariae

Scientific classification
- Kingdom: Animalia
- Phylum: Arthropoda
- Clade: Pancrustacea
- Class: Insecta
- Order: Diptera
- Family: Syrphidae
- Genus: Epistrophe
- Species: E. grossulariae

Binomial name
- Epistrophe grossulariae (Meigen, 1822)

Synonyms
- Syrphus grossulariae Meigen, 1822

= Epistrophe grossulariae =

Species of fly

Epistrophe grossulariae is a Holarctic species of hoverfly.

== Description ==
External images For terms see Morphology of Diptera
Wing length 9-12·25 mm. Thorax dull greenish. Tergite 4 with entire yellow band. At least anterior femora dark at base, sometimes hind also. Frons black above lunule and at least half black-haired. Female has a bronzy-green area on upper part of frons. Yellow bands on tergites 3 and 4 straight. Tergite 5 with black band. Male genitalia are figured by Hippa (1968) . The larva is illustrated by Rotheray (1993)

== Distribution ==
Palaearctic and Nearctic Fennoscandia South to Spain, Italy and Yugoslavia. Ireland eastwards through Turkey Russia to Kamchatka. In North America from Alaska to Quebec and South to California.

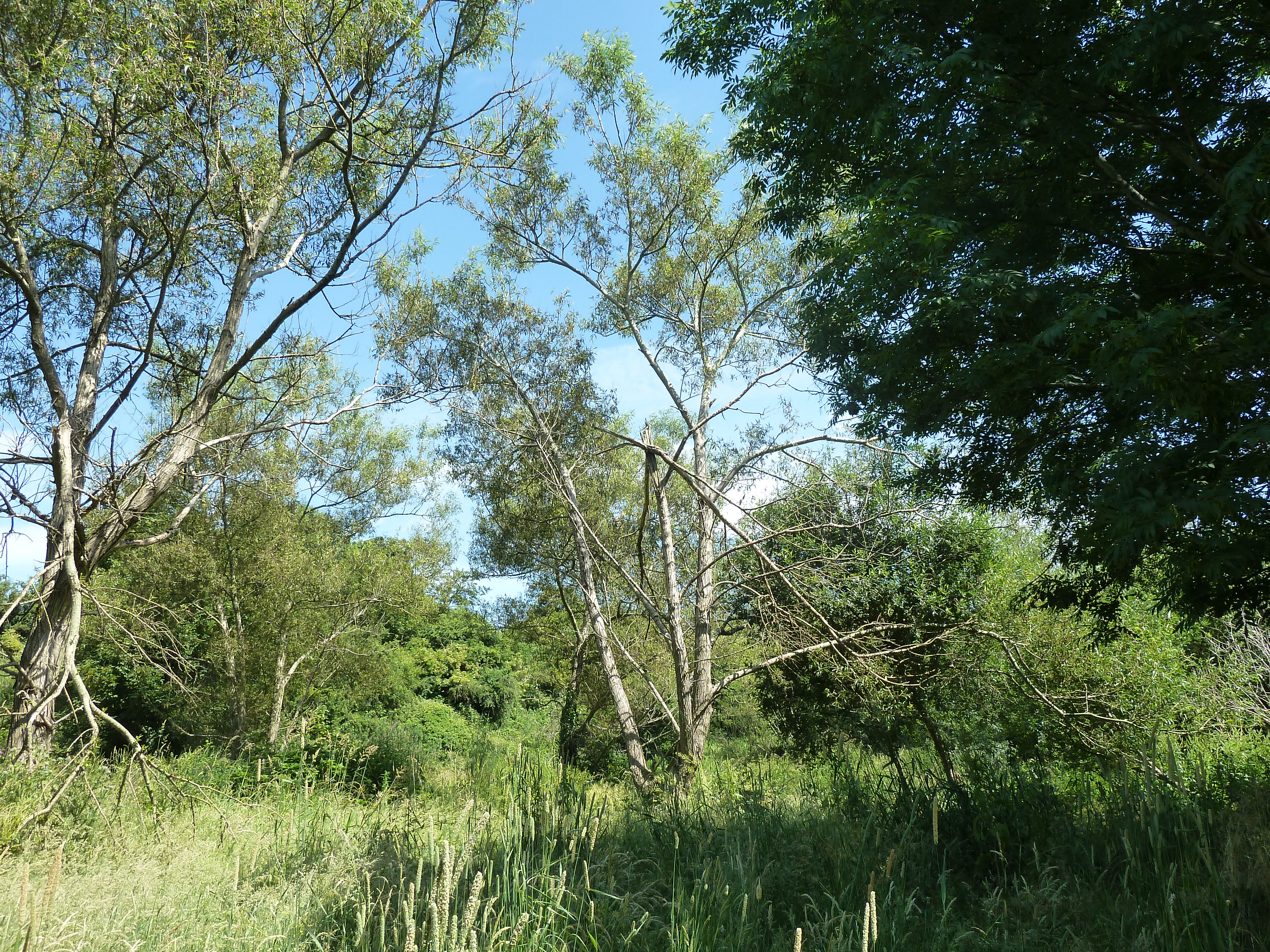
Habitat.Ireland.

== Biology ==
Habitat is deciduous woodland, particularly along rivers and streams, Salix swamp woodland, alpine grassland. Found in clearings, tracksides and beside streams. Flowers visited include white umbellifers, Centaurea, Cirsium, Filipendula, Geranium, Knautia, Rhododendron, Rubus, Sambucus nigra, Succisa, Valeriana. The flight period is end June to September. The larva feeds on aphids.
