= Epistrophe diaphana =

Scientific classification
- Kingdom: Animalia
- Phylum: Arthropoda
- Class: Insecta
- Order: Diptera
- Family: Syrphidae
- Genus: Epistrophe
- Species: E. diaphana

Binomial name
- Epistrophe diaphana (Zetterstedt, 1843)

Synonyms
- Scaeva diaphana Zetterstedt, 1843

Species of fly

Epistrophe diaphana is a European species of hoverfly.
