= Asiosphegina =

Scientific classification
- Kingdom: Animalia
- Phylum: Arthropoda
- Class: Insecta
- Order: Diptera
- Family: Syrphidae
- Subfamily: Eristalinae
- Tribe: Brachyopini
- Subtribe: Spheginina
- Genus: Sphegina
- Subgenus: Asiosphegina; Stackelberg, 1953

Type species
- Sphegina sibirica Stackelberg, 1953

Subgenus of insects

Asiosphegina is a subgenus of hoverflies characterized by sternite I being narrow and lanceolate, several times longer than wide or membranous, and non-pilose, as well as the postmetacoxal bridge being broad, it's posterior margin almost straight, at most with small triangular medial incision.

== Species ==
- Sphegina achaeta Hippa, Steenis & Mutin, 2015
- Sphegina adusta Hippa, Steenis & Mutin, 2015
- Sphegina albolobata Steenis, Hippa & Mutin, 2018
- Sphegina amamiensis Shiraki, 1968
- Sphegina amplistylus Steenis, Hippa & Mutin, 2018
- Sphegina apicalis Shiraki, 1930
- Sphegina asciiformis Brunetti, 1915
- Sphegina atricolor Hippa, Steenis & Mutin, 2015
- Sphegina atrimanus Steenis, Hippa & Mutin, 2018
- Sphegina bidens Hippa, Steenis & Mutin, 2015
- Sphegina bifida Steenis, Hippa & Mutin, 2018
- Sphegina bilobata Hippa, Steenis & Mutin, 2015
- Sphegina bispinosa Steenis, Hippa & Mutin, 2018
- Sphegina bracon Steenis, Hippa & Mutin, 2018
- Sphegina brevipilus Steenis, Hippa & Mutin, 2018
- Sphegina carinata Hippa, Steenis & Mutin, 2015
- Sphegina cerina Hippa, Steenis & Mutin, 2015
- Sphegina clavigera Steenis, Hippa & Mutin, 2018
- Sphegina collicola Steenis, Hippa & Mutin, 2018
- Sphegina crassispina Hippa, Steenis & Mutin, 2015
- Sphegina crinita Steenis, Hippa & Mutin, 2018
- Sphegina crucivena Hippa, Steenis & Mutin, 2015
- Sphegina culex Hippa, Steenis & Mutin, 2015
- Sphegina cultrigera Hippa, Steenis & Mutin, 2015
- Sphegina dentata Steenis, Hippa & Mutin, 2018
- Sphegina distincta Steenis, Hippa & Mutin, 2018
- Sphegina ensifera Hippa, Steenis & Mutin, 2015
- Sphegina exilipes Steenis, Hippa & Mutin, 2018
- Sphegina falcata Hippa, Steenis & Mutin, 2015
- Sphegina farinosa Steenis, Hippa & Mutin, 2018
- Sphegina fimbriata Steenis, Hippa & Mutin, 2018
- Sphegina forceps Hippa, Steenis & Mutin, 2015
- Sphegina forficata Hippa, Steenis & Mutin, 2015
- Sphegina freyana Stackelberg, 1956
- Sphegina furcillata Steenis, Hippa & Mutin, 2018
- Sphegina furva Hippa, Steenis & Mutin, 2015
- Sphegina ghatsi Steenis, Hippa & Mutin, 2018
- Sphegina gigantea Steenis, Hippa & Mutin, 2018
- Sphegina gigas Hippa, Steenis & Mutin, 2015
- Sphegina granditarsis Steenis, Hippa & Mutin, 2018
- Sphegina hamulata Steenis, Hippa & Mutin, 2018
- Sphegina hauseri Steenis, Hippa & Mutin, 2018
- Sphegina incretonigra Steenis, Hippa & Mutin, 2018
- Sphegina index Hippa, Steenis & Mutin, 2015
- Sphegina inflata Steenis, Hippa & Mutin, 2018
- Sphegina inventum Steenis, Hippa & Mutin, 2018
- Sphegina karnataka Steenis, Hippa & Mutin, 2018
- Sphegina licina Steenis, Hippa & Mutin, 2018
- Sphegina lobulata Steenis, Hippa & Mutin, 2018
- Sphegina lucida Steenis, Hippa & Mutin, 2018
- Sphegina malaisei Hippa, Steenis & Mutin, 2015
- Sphegina minuta Hippa, Steenis & Mutin, 2015
- Sphegina mirifica Hippa, Steenis & Mutin, 2015
- Sphegina nasuta Hippa, Steenis & Mutin, 2015
- Sphegina nigrotarsata Steenis, Hippa & Mutin, 2018
- Sphegina nitidifrons Stackelberg, 1956
- Sphegina nubicola Steenis, Hippa & Mutin, 2018
- Sphegina orientalis Kertész, 1914
- Sphegina ornata Steenis, Hippa & Mutin, 2018
- Sphegina parvula Hippa, Steenis & Mutin, 2015
- Sphegina perlobata Steenis, Hippa & Mutin, 2018
- Sphegina philippina Thompson, 1999
- Sphegina plautus Steenis, Hippa & Mutin, 2018
- Sphegina pollex Hippa, Steenis & Mutin, 2015
- Sphegina pollinosa Hippa, Steenis & Mutin, 2015
- Sphegina prolixa Steenis, Hippa & Mutin, 2018
- Sphegina pusilla Hippa, Steenis & Mutin, 2015
- Sphegina radula Hippa, Steenis & Mutin, 2015
- Sphegina raduloides Hippa, Steenis & Mutin, 2015
- Sphegina setosa Steenis, Hippa & Mutin, 2018
- Sphegina sibirica Stackelberg, 1953
- Sphegina siculifera Hippa, Steenis & Mutin, 2015
- Sphegina simplex Hippa, Steenis & Mutin, 2015
- Sphegina sinesmila Hippa, Steenis & Mutin, 2015
- Sphegina spathigera Steenis, Hippa & Mutin, 2018
- Sphegina spenceri Steenis, Hippa & Mutin, 2018
- Sphegina strigillata Steenis, Hippa & Mutin, 2018
- Sphegina subradula Hippa, Steenis & Mutin, 2015
- Sphegina taiwanensis Steenis, Hippa & Mutin, 2018
- Sphegina trichaeta Hippa, Steenis & Mutin, 2015
- Sphegina trispina Hippa, Steenis & Mutin, 2015
- Sphegina umbrosa Steenis, Hippa & Mutin, 2018
- Sphegina uncinata Hippa, Steenis & Mutin, 2015
- Sphegina verrucosa Steenis, Hippa & Mutin, 2018
- Sphegina vietnamensis Steenis, Hippa & Mutin, 2018
