= Sphegina cerina =

Scientific classification
- Kingdom: Animalia
- Phylum: Arthropoda
- Clade: Pancrustacea
- Class: Insecta
- Order: Diptera
- Family: Syrphidae
- Genus: Sphegina
- Species: S. cerina

Binomial name
- Sphegina cerina Hippa, Steenis & Mutin, 2015

Species of fly

Sphegina (Asiosphegina) cerina is a species of hoverfly in the family Syrphidae found in Kambaiti Pass, Myanmar, a montane forest with swampy areas and streams located 2000 meters above sea level.

== Etymology ==
The name comes from Latin 'cerina', meaning 'wax-coloured or yellowish', referring to the fly's yellowish coloration.

== Description ==
Like other species in its genus, S. (A.) cerina is small, slender, and wasp-like. It bears a slight resemblance to species such as S. (A.) cultrigera, S. (A.) ensifera, S. (A.) siculifera, S. (A.) parvula, S. (A.) sinesmila, S. (A.) minuta, and S. (A.) pusilla, but is easily differentiated by its yellow gena and yellow scutellum, as well as the long S-shaped surstylus and the claw-like, apically tapering superior lobe. In male specimens, the body length is 6.2 millimeters. The wings are 6.0 millimeters long, hyaline with yellowish stigma. The face is yellow and moderately concave with a weakly developed frontal prominence. The antenna are yellow, the basal flagellomere 1.5 times longer than broad, and the arista is yellowish and pilose. The surstyli are nearly symmetrical and the superior lobes are slightly asymmetrical. Females are much the same except for normal sexual dimorphism; body length is 5.9 to 6.8 millimeters and wing length is 5.6 to 6.5 millimeters.
