= Sphegina dentata =

Scientific classification
- Kingdom: Animalia
- Phylum: Arthropoda
- Clade: Pancrustacea
- Class: Insecta
- Order: Diptera
- Family: Syrphidae
- Genus: Sphegina
- Subgenus: Asiosphegina
- Species: S. dentata

Binomial name
- Sphegina dentata Hippa, Steenis & Mutin, 2018

Species of fly

Sphegina dentata is a species of hoverfly in the family Syrphidae found in Taiwan.

== Etymology ==
The name comes from Latin ‘dentata’, meaning ‘dentate’, referring to the dentate male cercus.

== Description ==
In male specimens, the body length is 7.1–7.9 millimeters. The wings are 5.4–5.9 millimeters, entirely microtrichose and hyaline, with brownish stigma. The face is black, concave, strongly projected antero-ventrally, with a weakly developed frontal prominence and long pilose along the eye-margin. The gena and mouth edge are black, with a large subtriangular non-pollinose shiny area; frons and vertex black; a large trapezoidal area posterior of the lunula non-pollinose and shiny; occiput black, with light yellow pilose; antenna dark brown to black with black setae dorsally on scape and pedicel, basal flagellomere round; arista only basally short and pilose, slightly more than three times as long as the basal flagellomere. The thorax is black; scutellum black, semicircular, black, and shiny; pro- and mesoleg yellow on basal 1/10 of femora and basal ¼–⅓ of tibiae, tarsomeres 1–2 dark yellow; metafemur black with basal 1/5 yellow, slightly incrassate; metatibia black and yellow biannulate, without apicoventral dens; metatarsus entirely black, basal tarsomere rather thin; terga black. The surstyli and superior lobes are only slightly asymmetrical and the cerci are dentate and asymmetrical. No female specimens are known.

== Related Species ==
S. dentata is similar to S. nigerrima, though it differs by having the lower epimeron with entirely grey pollinose (anterior half of the lower epimeron non-pollinose and shiny in S. nigerrima) as well as squarish and dentate cerci (cerci non-dentate in S. nigerrima). The male genitalia are similar to S. tricoloripes and S. umbrosa, though it differs from the latter by having a strongly sclerotized subapical tooth on the cercus and from the former by having only one cercal tooth instead of a row of 3–4 teeth. All three species resemble the East-Palaearctic species S. elongata, S. freyana, and S. grunini, but differ by having entirely grey pollinose pleura (instead of having the pleura extensively non-pollinose and shiny).
