= Sphegina carinata =

Scientific classification
- Kingdom: Animalia
- Phylum: Arthropoda
- Clade: Pancrustacea
- Class: Insecta
- Order: Diptera
- Family: Syrphidae
- Genus: Sphegina
- Species: S. carinata

Binomial name
- Sphegina carinata Hippa, Steenis & Mutin, 2015

Species of fly

Sphegina (Asiosphegina) carinata is a species of hoverfly in the family Syrphidae found in Kambaiti Pass, Myanmar, a montane forest with swampy areas and streams located 2000 meters above sea level.

== Etymology ==
The name comes from Latin 'carinata', meaning 'keeled', referring to the keeled hind trochanter.

== Description ==
Like other species in its genus, S. (A.) carinata is small, slender, and wasp-like. In male specimens, body length is 6.8 to 8.0 millimeters and wing length is 5.3 to 6.5 millimeters. The face is black, strongly concave dorsally with a weakly developed frontal prominence. The gena is shiny black; frons and vertex dull black, lunula shiny brown; occiput dull black; antenna brown, basal flagellomere darker dorsally; thorax black; pro- and mesoleg yellow, tarsomeres 4 and 5 black; metaleg with coxa dark, trochanter yellow with dark transverse carina ventrally on apical part, femur black with the narrower curved basal part yellow; metatibia without an apico-ventral tooth, black, the basal 1/6 and a broad annulus on the apical 1/2 yellow; metatarsus entirely black. The surstyli and superior lobes are strongly asymmetrical and the arista is distinctly pilose. The wings are hyaline, stigma yellowish, the infuscated pattern brownish.

A female specimen of S. (A.) bispinosa was found to be conspecifc with female specimens of S. (A.) carinata. Female specimens are similar to males except for normal sexual dimorphism; body length is 7.1 to 7.5 millimeters and wing length is 6.5 to 7.0 millimeters.

== Related Species ==
S. (A.) carinata is similar to S. (A.) index, though they differ by the two most lateral of the enlarged setae on the left side of male sternite IV (twice as long as the longest medial setae in S. (A.) index, five times as long in S. (A.) carinata), the male superior lobe (in S. (A.) index bearing an inconspicuous lobe baso-dorsally as well as a large flip-like lobe ventrally, partly covering a recurrent finger-like lobe, and in S. (A.) carinata bearing a pointed finger-like lobe as well as a small flip-like lobe in a more dorsal position, far from the ventral straight finger-like lobe).

Both these species are similar to S. (A.) malaisei, though S. (A.) malaisei lacks the infuscated wing pattern. Unlike other similar species, S. (A.) carinata and S. (A.) malaisei both possess a transverse ventral carina on the metatrochanter as well as having the two lateral strongest setae on the left side of male sternite IV longer than the other more medial setae. The male genitalia are similar, but differ in the details of the superior lobe: in S. (A.) carinata there is a curved sharp finger-like lobe basodorsally (in S. (A.) index and S. (A.) malaisei there's a rounded low lobe) and a large flip-like lobe in ventral position on the right side (the homologic lobe is smaller and more dorsal in the other two species).

S. (A.) carinata resembles S. (A.) gigas, S. (A.) bispinosa, and S. (A.) hansoni in having long subapical, antero-dorsal setae on the metafemur and by having its sternite VI with a finger-like process, covered with long pile. However, S. (A.) bispinosa differs by having 7 long, strong setae on the left side of male sternite IV instead of just two, and by having 2–3 long subapical anterolateral setae on metafemur instead of only one. S. hansoni differs by having three setae on sternite IV instead of just two, and by having nearly symmetrical surstyli.

Within the species which have male sternite IV asymmetrical and armed with spinose setae, and which have male sternite VI with one or two processes, S. (A.) carinata belongs to a group which has the right side surstylus broader than the left side one, together with S. (A.) crassispina, S. (A.) gigas, S. (A.) index, S. (A.) malaisei, and S. (A.) trispina.
