= Sphegina clavigera =

Scientific classification
- Kingdom: Animalia
- Phylum: Arthropoda
- Clade: Pancrustacea
- Class: Insecta
- Order: Diptera
- Family: Syrphidae
- Genus: Sphegina
- Subgenus: Asiosphegina
- Species: S. clavigera

Binomial name
- Sphegina clavigera Hippa, Steenis & Mutin, 2018

Species of fly

Sphegina clavigera is a species of hoverfly in the family Syrphidae found in Vietnam. It's similar to S. crassispina and S. hauseri.

== Etymology ==
The name comes from Latin ‘clavigera’, meaning ‘bearing claws’, referring to the two claw-like lobes on the male superior lobe.

== Description ==
In male specimens, body length is 7.2 millimetres and wing length is 6.3 millimetres. The face is black and concave, with a strongly developed frontal prominence and long pilose along the eye-margin. The gena and mouth edge are black, with a large subtriangular non-pollinose shiny area; frons and vertex black, a narrow subtriangular area posterior of the lunula non-pollinose and shiny; occiput black with light yellow pilose; antenna with scape and pedicel black with black setae dorsally, basal flagellomere oval-shaped and dark brown; scutellum black and subtriangular, shiny medially; pro- and mesoleg yellow, tarsomeres 4 and 5 black; metaleg with coxa black, trochanter yellow, femur black with basal half yellow, slightly incrassate, and slightly concave dorso-basally, tibia black and yellow biannulate, without apicoventral dens, tarsus entirely black with basal tarsomere very thin. The wings are hyaline and entirely microtrichose, with yellowish stigma and brown membrane infuscated at the junction of veins R2+3 and R4+5, along veins bm-cu, r-m, M1, at the junction of veins M1 and R4+5, and at apical appendix of vein R2+3. The arista is long and pilose, nearly 3.5 times as long as the basal flagellomere. The surstyli are asymmetrical, the superior lobes only slightly so, and there are finger-like process basomedially on the surstyli. Female specimens are much the same, except for normal sexual dimorphism.

== Habitat ==
S. clavigera was found near the Tram Ton Pass, the highest mountain pass in Vietnam, in an area of montane forest containing muddy areas and small streams. It was collected together with Sphegina index and S. malaisei, all flying abundantly despite the cold and wet weather.
