= Sphegina bracon =

Scientific classification
- Kingdom: Animalia
- Phylum: Arthropoda
- Clade: Pancrustacea
- Class: Insecta
- Order: Diptera
- Family: Syrphidae
- Genus: Sphegina
- Species: S. bracon

Binomial name
- Sphegina bracon Hippa, Steenis & Mutin, 2018

Species of fly

Sphegina bracon is a species of hoverfly in the family Syrphidae found in Vietnam along with specimens of S. (A.) lucida, S. (A.) nigrotarsata, S. (A.) spenceri, S. (A.) verrucosa, and S. (A.) vietnamensis.

== Etymology ==
The names ‘bracon’ refers to the species of wasp the fly resembles.

== Description ==
In male specimens, body length is 5.9 to 7.4 millimeters and wing length is 4.2 to 5.0 millimeters. The face is black, ventral half brown-yellow; concave with weakly developed frontal prominence and long pilose along the eye-margin. The gena and mouth edge are yellow with a large subtriangular non-pollinose shiny area; frons and vertex black with a semi-circular area posterior of the lunula non-pollinose and shiny; occiput black with light yellow pilose; antenna yellow to brown-yellow with black setae dorsally on scape and pedicel; thorax dark brown to black; scutellum black, semicircular, entirely shiny; pro- and mesoleg yellow, tarsomeres 4–5 black; metaleg with coxa black, trochanter yellow, femur and tibia black and yellow biannulate, tarsus black with tarsomeres 2 and 3 sometimes dark brown. The metafemur is slightly thick and the metatibia has short and weak apicoventral dens with a thin and narrow basal tarsomere. The basal flagellomere is oval and the arista is pilose, about three times as long as basal flagellomere. Female specimens were found that most likely belong to either S. (A.) bracon or to S. (A.) vietnamensis, but are impossible to identify for certain as the males of these species are only separable by the characters of the genitalia.

== Related Species ==
S. (A.) bracon is similar to both S. (A.) furcillata and S. (A.) vietnamensis. The only reliable way to differentiate is by the differences in the male genitalia. In S. (A.) furcillata , the pile dorsally of the wing base is black (in S. (A.) bracon and S. (A.) vietnamensis it's at least partly yellow or dark brown) and the metafemur is slightly less thick than in S. (A.) vietnamensis. S. (A.) bracon is similar in appearance to S. (A.) spenceri, but the two are easily told apart upon closer examination. The females of S. (A.) spenceri differ from the supposed females of S. (A.) bracon and S. (A.) vietnamensis by the wider vertex with a medially shiny ridge and a lateral pollinosity of the ridge that's more velvet textured than the other pollinosity.
