= Sphegina asciiformis =

Scientific classification
- Kingdom: Animalia
- Phylum: Arthropoda
- Clade: Pancrustacea
- Class: Insecta
- Order: Diptera
- Family: Syrphidae
- Genus: Sphegina
- Species: S. asciiformis

Binomial name
- Sphegina asciiformis Brunetti, 1915

Species of fly

Sphegina (Asiosphegina) asciiformis is a species of syrphid fly in the family Syrphidae found in India.

== Description ==
In female specimens, body length is 4.0 millimeters and wing length is 4.0 millimeters. The face is black; gena black, mouth edge red-brown with large triangular non-pollinose shiny area; occiput black; antenna brown to black; thorax dark brown to black; scutellum black, shiny, and semi-circular; pro- and mesoleg yellow; metafemur black and yellow biannulate, incrassate; metatibia black and yellow biannulate; metatarsus entirely black, basal tarsomere thick. A rather wide semi-circular area posterior of the lunula is non-pollinose and shiny. The arista is long. No male specimens are known.

== Related Species ==
S. (A.) asciiformis' hyaline wing, oblique vein dm-cu, and short tergum II are similar to S. (A.) apicalis, S. (A.) farinosa, and S. (A.) nubicola, but differs by the entirely yellow pro- and mesolegs (in all others at least tarsomeres 4 and 5 of the pro- and mesotarsus are black) and by the entirely black abdomen.
