= Sphegina apicalis =

Scientific classification
- Kingdom: Animalia
- Phylum: Arthropoda
- Clade: Pancrustacea
- Class: Insecta
- Order: Diptera
- Family: Syrphidae
- Genus: Sphegina
- Subgenus: Asiosphegina
- Species: S. apicalis

Binomial name
- Sphegina apicalis Shiraki, 1930

Species of fly

Sphegina apicalis is a species of hoverfly in the family Syrphidae found in Taiwan.

== Description ==
In male specimens, body length is 5.2 to 5.5 millimeters and wing length is 4.4 to 4.7 millimeters. The face is black and concave with a weakly developed frontal prominence. The gena is black, mouth edge brown to dark yellow, with large triangular non-pollinose shiny area; occiput black; antenna black with black setae dorsally on scape and pedicel; thorax dark brown to black; scutellum black, shiny, and subtriangular; pro- and mesoleg yellow, tarsomeres 4 and 5 black; metaleg with coxa black, trochanter yellow; femur black and yellow biannulate, incrassate; tibia black and yellow biannulate, without apicoventral dens; tarsus entirely black, basal tarsomere very thick. A very narrow semi-circular area posterior of the lunula is non-pollinose and shiny. The basal flagellomere is squarish, the basal ¼ of the arista short and pilose, about three times as long as the basal flagellomere. The cerci are unmodified and subtriangular; surstyli asymmetrical, the ventral lobe on the right side with subtriangular lobe on posterior margin, on the left side with a long vertical lobe laterally; superior lobe with several sublobes. Female specimens are much the same except for normal sexual dimorphism; body length is 5.0 millimeters and wing length is 3.9 millimeters.

== Habitat ==
S. apicalis is widely distributed in Taiwan at an altitude between 2200 and 2820 meters above sea level. Specimens have been found visiting the flower Astilbe longicarpa (Saxifragaceae) near a small brook within a mainly older Pinus taiwanensis afforestation, and at Xiangyang collected together with S. dentata, S. orientalis, and S. taiwanenis.

== Related species ==
S. apicalis is similar to S. nubicola. They can be differentiated by the very different male genitalia: in S. apicalis the surstyli are angular (curved in S. nubicola), the ventral lobe of the right surstylus has a prominent sublobe at posterior margin (weak sublobe in S. nubicola) and the superior lobes are complicated, with several sublobes (simple in S. nubicola, with only posteroventral claw-like sublobe). The female of S. apicalis differs from that of S. nubicola by the squarish basal flagellomere (oval in S. nubicola) and the squarish, slightly rectangular sterna IV and V (widely to very widely rectangular in S. nubicola).
