= Sphegina atrimanus =

Scientific classification
- Kingdom: Animalia
- Phylum: Arthropoda
- Clade: Pancrustacea
- Class: Insecta
- Order: Diptera
- Family: Syrphidae
- Genus: Sphegina
- Species: S. atrimanus

Binomial name
- Sphegina atrimanus Hippa, Steenis & Mutin, 2018

Species of fly

Sphegina (Asiosphegina) atrimanus is a species of hoverfly in the family Syrphidae found in Vietnam.

== Etymology ==
The name comes from Latin ‘atrimanus’, meaning ‘black-hand’, referring to the predominantly black protarsus.

== Description ==
In male specimens, body length is 6.2 millimeters and wing length is 5.2 millimeters. The face is black, ventral half yellow; concave, with a strongly developed frontal prominence. The gena and mouth edge are yellow with a large subtriangular non-pollinose shiny area; frons and vertex black; occiput black with light yellow pilose; scape dark brown; pedicel and basal flagellomere dark yellow; thorax dark brown to black; postpronotum and medial part of pleuron yellow; scutellum black, subtriangular, shiny medially; pro- and mesoleg yellow, protarsus with tarsomere 1 on basal half yellow, on apical half black, tarsomeres 2–5 black and mesotarsus with tarsomeres 4 and 5 dark brown to black; metaleg with coxa black, trochanter yellow; femur black and yellow biannulate, slightly incrassate and club shaped; tibia black and yellow biannulate, without apicoventral dens; tarsus entirely black, basal tarsomere very thick. The basal flagellomere is oval, the arista short and pilose, about three times as long as the basal flagellomere. No female specimens are known.

== Related species ==
S. (A.) atrimanus is similar to S. (A.) granditarsis, S. (A.) nigrotarsata, and S. (A.) orientalis, as all have an area of very long setae on the cercus as well as small setae on the surstylar apodeme and the membrane between the apodeme and the ventral margin of tergum IX. However, S. (A.) atrimanus differs by having the angle between dorsal and ventral lobe of the surstylus as a right angle (acute in the others); by having the apex of its ventral lobe long, extending much more ventrally than the posterior part of the surstylar apodeme (both approximately at the same level in the others); and by having the cercus enlarged. S. (A.) atrimanus is similar also to S. (A.) nasuta, but differs by having the dorsal lobe of surstylus slightly angled and dilated on the apical part (evenly curved and evenly tapering towards the apex in S. (A.) nasuta). The genitalia of S. (A.) atrimanus and S. (A.) incretonigra are almost identical, the only difference being that the former has the apical part of the surstylus, especially on the left side, and the superior lobe wider.
