= Sphegina crassispina =

Scientific classification
- Kingdom: Animalia
- Phylum: Arthropoda
- Clade: Pancrustacea
- Class: Insecta
- Order: Diptera
- Family: Syrphidae
- Genus: Sphegina
- Subgenus: Asiosphegina
- Species: S. crassispina

Binomial name
- Sphegina crassispina Hippa, Steenis & Mutin, 2015

Species of fly

Sphegina crassispina is a species of hoverfly in the family Syrphidae found in Kambaiti Pass, Myanmar, a montane forest with swampy areas and streams located 2000 meters above sea level. A specimen was found in China that fits the description of S. crassispina save for the more extensively shiny frons and the slightly more protruding frontal prominence.

== Etymology ==
The name comes from the Latin words 'crassus', meaning 'big', and 'spina', meaning 'thorn', referring to the strong spine-like setae on the male sternite IV.

== Description ==
Like other species in its genus, S. crassispina is small, slender, and wasp-like. In male specimens the body length is 8.3–8.4 millimeters (6.0–7.5 in females). The wings are 6.5–6.9 millimeters long (5.4–6.6 in females) and vary from hyaline to weakly brownish, with a brown infuscated pattern and yellowish stigma. The face is black, strongly concave, strongly projected antero-ventrally with a weakly developed frontal prominence. The antenna are brown, the basal flagellomere oval and paler than the scape and pedicel, baso-ventrally reddish; the arista is pilose. The gena is shiny black; frons and vertex dull black; lunula shiny brown; occiput dull black; thorax black; scutellum semicircular with lateral part brown. The pro- and mesoleg are yellow, tarsomeres 4 and 5 black; metaleg with coxa brown, trochanter yellow, simple; metafemur black, the basal 1/3 yellow; metatibia yellow with the apical 1/5 and an annulus on the basal 1/2 brownish, without a distinct apico-ventral tooth-like projection; metatarsus black with golden pile. The surstyli and superior lobes are asymmetrical and there's a short finger-like process sub-basally on the medial side of the dorsal lobe of the surstylus.

== Related species ==
S. crassispina is similar to S. carinata, S. malaisei, and S. index, though it can be differentiated by male sternite IV (the four enlarged setae on the left side are steadily diminishing in length towards the medial line instead of being two longer + two shorter ones as in the other species), the right side surstylus (broader than in the other species), and the arrangement of sublobes on the superior lobe (different in all these species).

S. crassispina is also similar to S. bispinosa and S. hansoni, though it differs from both by the hyaline wing (with infuscated pattern in the other species), three short stout setae on the left side of male sternite IV (seven long and strong setae in S. bispinosa, three in S. hansoni), having the metafemur without long setae subapically on the prolateral side (2–3 setae in S. bispinosa), lacking a long seta subapically on the prolateral side of the metafemur (present in S. hansoni), and by the asymmetrical surstyli (nearly symmetrical in S. hansoni).
