= Sphegina guptai =

Scientific classification
- Kingdom: Animalia
- Phylum: Arthropoda
- Clade: Pancrustacea
- Class: Insecta
- Order: Diptera
- Family: Syrphidae
- Subfamily: Eristalinae
- Tribe: Brachyopini
- Subtribe: Spheginina
- Genus: Sphegina
- Species: S. guptai

Binomial name
- Sphegina guptai Mutin, 1998

Species of fly

Sphegina guptai is a species of hoverfly in the family Syrphidae found in India. It's similar to S. elegans in general appearance and characters of the male genitalia. It differs from known Oriental species of Sphegina by the shiny black abdomen with widened terga III and IV. Only S. quadrisetae has a somewhat similar appearance.

== Description ==
In male specimens, the body length is 5.2 millimeters and wing length is 4.6 millimeters. Male genitalia is long, curved, widening towards the apex surstylus with subapical ventral sublobe. The face is yellow and concave with a weakly developed frontal prominence. The gena and mouth edge are yellow; occiput brown with soft, light yellow hairs; antenna dark brown, with black setae dorsally on scape and pedicel; thorax black; scutellum dark brown and subtriangular; proleg yellow; protarsus yellow with tarsomeres four and five dark brown; metaleg dark brown with basal half of the metafemur yellow, very weakly incrassate; tibia dark brown and yellow biannulate, slightly club shaped, without apicoventral dens, basal tarsomere thin. A narrow fascia posterior of the lunula is non-pollinose and shiny. The basal flagellomere is squarish and the arista is about three times as long as the basal flagellomere and covered in long, soft hairs.

Female specimens are much the same except for normal sexual dimorphism; the body length is 5.7 millimeters and wing length is 5.7 millimeters. The ventral half of the face and mouth edge are yellow, as well as the postpronotum. The basal flagellomere is round and as wide as it is long; the arista is about three times as long as the basal flagellomere and covered in long, soft hairs.
