= Sphegina amplistylus =

Scientific classification
- Kingdom: Animalia
- Phylum: Arthropoda
- Clade: Pancrustacea
- Class: Insecta
- Order: Diptera
- Family: Syrphidae
- Genus: Sphegina
- Species: S. amplistylus

Binomial name
- Sphegina amplistylus Steenis, Hippa & Mutin, 2018

Species of fly

Sphegina (Asiosphegina) amplistylus is a species of hoverfly in the family Syrphidae found in the Philippines. It's similar to S. inflata, S. philippina, and S. spathigera.

== Etymology ==
The name comes from Latin ‘amplistylus’, meaning ‘large stylus’, referring to the enlarged left-side surstylus.

== Description ==
In male specimens, the body length is 6.4 millimeters and wing length is 5.3 millimeters. The face is concave with a very weakly developed frontal prominence. The face is black, ventral half dark yellow to brown; gena and mouth edge dark yellow to brown, with large subtriangular non-pollinose shiny area; occiput black; antenna brown with black setae dorsally on scape and pedicel; thorax black; postpronotum dark brown; pleuron entirely grey; scutellum black, short, and widely sub-triangular; pro- and mesoleg yellow, tarsomeres 4–5 black; metaleg with coxa black and trochanter yellow; femur black with basal ⅓ yellow, rather strongly incrassate; tibia black and yellow biannulate, with large rounded apicoventral dens; tarsus entirely black, basal tarsomere thick. The basal flagellomere is rectangular, the arista long and pilose, nearly three times as long as the basal flagellomere. The cerci are unmodified, roundish; surstyli asymmetrical with the dorsal lobe of left surstylus strongly inflated; superior lobe slightly asymmetrical, with several sublobes of which the anteroventral one is very long. No female specimens are known.
