= Sphegina cultrigera =

Scientific classification
- Kingdom: Animalia
- Phylum: Arthropoda
- Clade: Pancrustacea
- Class: Insecta
- Order: Diptera
- Family: Syrphidae
- Genus: Sphegina
- Subgenus: Asiosphegina
- Species: S. cultrigera

Binomial name
- Sphegina cultrigera Hippa, Steenis & Mutin, 2015

Species of fly

Sphegina cultrigera is a species of hoverfly in the family Syrphidae found in Kambaiti Pass, Myanmar, a montane forest with swampy areas and streams located 2000 meters above sea level.

== Etymology ==
The name is from Latin, cultrigera, bearing a knife, referring to the knife-like lobe on the male sternite IV.

== Description ==
In male specimens, the body length is 5.3 millimeters. The wings are 4.5 millimeters long and hyaline with brownish stigma. The face is black and weakly concave with a weakly developed frontal prominence. The gena are shiny black; frons and vertex black and semi-shiny; lunula brownish; occiput dull black; antenna brown, basal flagellomere oval and baso-ventrally reddish, arista almost bare; thorax black; scutellum trapezoidal, shiny dorsally. The pro- and mesolegs are yellow, tarsomeres 4 and 5 black; metaleg with coxa brown, trochanter simple, yellow; metafemur yellow, the apical 1/6 and a broad annulus on the basal 1/2 brown; metatibia without apico-ventral tooth, yellow except the apical 1/4 black and brownish annulus on the basal 1/2 medially; metatarsus dark brown. The tergites are shiny black, tergite III with a yellow subanterior fascia, nearly 1/2 as wide as the length of tergite; sternite IV brown anteriorly and brownish posteriorly, the sword-like lobe on the left side pale yellowish; sternite VI black, with a very small tubercle at the posterior margin; sternites VII and VIII black. The surstyli are slightly asymmetrical, the cercus is enlarged, and the superior lobes are symmetrical. No female specimens are known.

== Related Species ==
S. cultrigera is similar to S. siculifera, S. ensifera, and S. philippina. Unlike other Sphegina species, all bear a long sword-like lobe postero-laterally on the left side of male sternite IV. S. cultrigera differs from the other species by having a black gena, narrowly shiny frons above the lunula, and a metafemur 3.6 times longer than broad. S. philippina differs from the other species by having male genitalia with small cerci, strongly asymmetric surstyli, a metatibia produced into a spur apicoventrally, and a metafemur lacking a subapical paler annulus.
