= Sphegina brevipilus =

Scientific classification
- Kingdom: Animalia
- Phylum: Arthropoda
- Clade: Pancrustacea
- Class: Insecta
- Order: Diptera
- Family: Syrphidae
- Genus: Sphegina
- Species: S. brevipilus

Binomial name
- Sphegina brevipilus Hippa, Steenis & Mutin, 2018

Species of fly

Sphegina (Asiosphegina) brevipilus is a species of hoverfly in the family Syrphidae found in China. It's similar to both S. (A.) plautus and S. (A.) simplex; it and S. (A.) plautus are the only known species with a sclerite between the bases of surstyli as well as posteriorly from the cerci.

== Etymology ==
The name comes from Latin ‘brevipilis’, meaning ‘short-haired’, referring to the unusually short pile on the male cercus.

== Description ==
Like other species in its genus, S. (A.) brevipilus is small, slender, and wasp-like. In male specimens, the body length is 5.4 to 5.8 millimeters and wing length is 4.3 to 4.6 millimeters. The face is black, concave with a very weakly developed frontal prominence and long pilose along the eye-margin. The gena and mouth edge are black with a large subtriangular non-pollinose shiny area; frons and vertex black, with a subtriangular area posterior of the lunula non-pollinose and shiny; occiput black with light yellow pilose; antenna brown-yellow to brown with black setae dorsally on scape and pedicel; thorax dark brown to black; scutellum black and subtriangular; pro- and mesoleg yellow, protarsus with tarsomeres 1 and 2 dark brown, tarsomeres 3–5 yellow; mesotarsus with tarsomeres 3–5 brown to black; metaleg with coxa black, trochanter yellow, femur black and yellow biannulate; metatibia black and yellow biannulate, with short, black, apically rounded apicoventral dens; metatarsus entirely black with thick basal tarsomere. The wings are hyaline, microtrichose, stigma yellowish, infuscated at junction of veins R2+3 and R4+5, along crossveins dm-cu and M1 and at the apex of vein R1+2. The basal flagellomere is oval, the arista long and pilose, about 2.5 times as long as the basal flagellomere. Females are much the same except for normal sexual dimorphism; body length is 6.0 millimeters and wing length is 5.4 millimeters. The mesoleg is mostly brown and the arista is about three times as long as the basal flagellomere.
