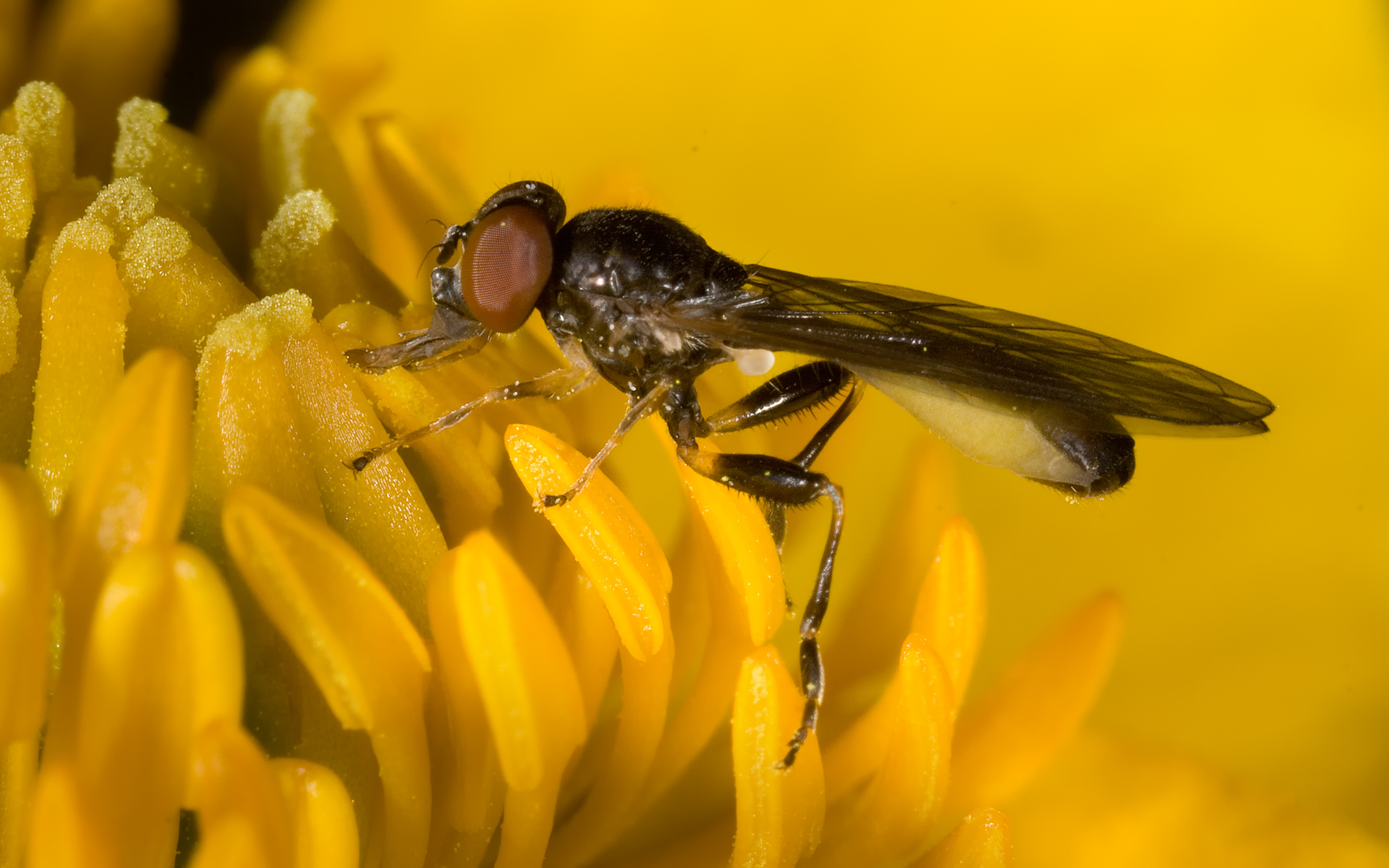

Scientific classification
- Kingdom: Animalia
- Phylum: Arthropoda
- Clade: Pancrustacea
- Class: Insecta
- Order: Diptera
- Family: Syrphidae
- Subfamily: Eristalinae
- Tribe: Brachyopini
- Subtribe: Spheginina
- Genus: Sphegina
- Species: S. montana

Binomial name
- Sphegina montana Becker, 1921

Synonyms
- Sphegina eoa Stackelberg, 1953; Sphegina fuliginosa Goeldlin, 1974

= Sphegina montana =

Species of fly

Sphegina montana is a species of hoverfly from Central and Northern Europe. It is absent from Great Britain and Ireland. The face is normally all black; body length is 5–6 mm.
