= Sphegina punctata =

Scientific classification
- Kingdom: Animalia
- Phylum: Arthropoda
- Clade: Pancrustacea
- Class: Insecta
- Order: Diptera
- Family: Syrphidae
- Subfamily: Eristalinae
- Tribe: Brachyopini
- Subtribe: Spheginina
- Genus: Sphegina
- Species: S. punctata

Binomial name
- Sphegina punctata Cole, 1921

Species of hoverfly

Sphegina punctata is a species of hoverfly in the family Syrphidae.

== Distribution ==
Canada, United States.
