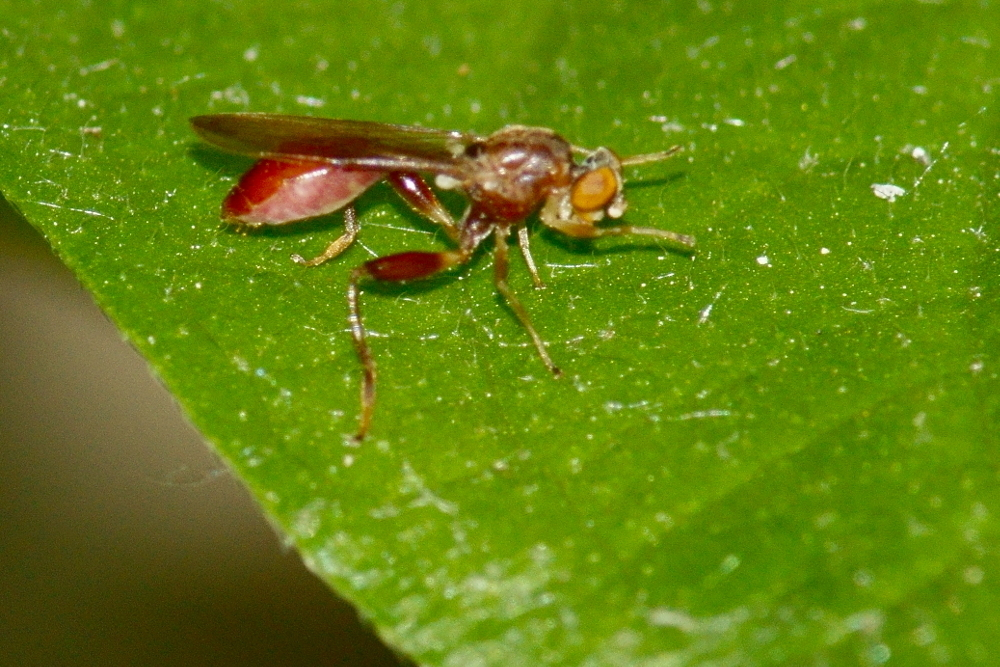

Scientific classification
- Kingdom: Animalia
- Phylum: Arthropoda
- Clade: Pancrustacea
- Class: Insecta
- Order: Diptera
- Family: Syrphidae
- Subfamily: Eristalinae
- Tribe: Brachyopini
- Subtribe: Spheginina
- Genus: Sphegina
- Species: S. campanulata

Binomial name
- Sphegina campanulata Robertson, 1901

= Sphegina campanulata =

Species of fly

Sphegina campanulata, the orange-horned pufftail, is a fairly common species of syrphid fly observed in the northeastern United States. Hoverflies can remain nearly motionless in flight. The adults are also known as flower flies, for they are commonly found on flowers from which they get both energy-giving nectar and protein-rich pollen. Larvae are found in accumulations of decaying sap under bark, usually in wet situations such as damp, shaded woodland and in partially submerged wood in streams and pools.
