= Sphegina parvula =

Scientific classification
- Kingdom: Animalia
- Phylum: Arthropoda
- Clade: Pancrustacea
- Class: Insecta
- Order: Diptera
- Family: Syrphidae
- Subfamily: Eristalinae
- Tribe: Brachyopini
- Subtribe: Spheginina
- Genus: Sphegina
- Species: S. parvula

Binomial name
- Sphegina parvula Hippa, Steenis & Mutin, 2015

Species of fly

Sphegina parvula is a species of hoverfly in the family Syrphidae. It is similar to Sphegina pusilla and Sphegina minuta and can be difficult to distinguish from them

== Distribution ==
Myanmar.

== Etymology ==
The name is Latin (parvula) – very small, referring to the small size of the fly.
