= Sphegina anatolii =

Scientific classification
- Kingdom: Animalia
- Phylum: Arthropoda
- Clade: Pancrustacea
- Class: Insecta
- Order: Diptera
- Family: Syrphidae
- Subfamily: Eristalinae
- Tribe: Brachyopini
- Subtribe: Spheginina
- Genus: Sphegina
- Species: S. anatolii

Binomial name
- Sphegina anatolii Mutin, 1999

Species of fly

Sphegina anatolii is a species of hoverfly in the family Syrphidae.

== Distribution ==
Russia.
