= Sphegina latifrons =

Scientific classification
- Kingdom: Animalia
- Phylum: Arthropoda
- Clade: Pancrustacea
- Class: Insecta
- Order: Diptera
- Family: Syrphidae
- Subfamily: Eristalinae
- Tribe: Brachyopini
- Subtribe: Spheginina
- Genus: Sphegina
- Species: S. latifrons

Binomial name
- Sphegina latifrons Egger, 1865

Species of fly

Sphegina latifrons is a species of hoverfly. The species was described by Johann Egger in 1865.

== Distribution ==
It has been found in Germany, Poland, the former Czechoslovakia, France, Spain, Switzerland, Austria, Italy, the Balkans, Romania, Bulgaria, and the former USSR.
