= Sphegina brachygaster =

Scientific classification
- Kingdom: Animalia
- Phylum: Arthropoda
- Clade: Pancrustacea
- Class: Insecta
- Order: Diptera
- Family: Syrphidae
- Subfamily: Eristalinae
- Tribe: Brachyopini
- Subtribe: Spheginina
- Genus: Sphegina
- Species: S. brachygaster

Binomial name
- Sphegina brachygaster Hull, 1935

Synonyms
- Sphegina brimleyi Shannon, 1940; Sphegina perplexa Hull, 1935

Species of fly

Sphegina brachygaster (Hull 1935), the Thick-waisted Pufftail , is a fairly common species of syrphid fly observed in the eastern United States. Hoverflies can remain nearly motionless in flight. The adults are also known as flower flies, for they are commonly found on flowers, from which they get both energy-giving nectar and protein-rich pollen. Larvae found in accumulations of decaying sap under bark, usually in wet situations such as damp, shaded woodland and in partially submerged wood in streams and pools.
