= Sphegina flavomaculata =

Scientific classification
- Kingdom: Animalia
- Phylum: Arthropoda
- Clade: Pancrustacea
- Class: Insecta
- Order: Diptera
- Family: Syrphidae
- Subfamily: Eristalinae
- Tribe: Brachyopini
- Subtribe: Spheginina
- Genus: Sphegina
- Species: S. flavomaculata

Binomial name
- Sphegina flavomaculata Malloch, 1922

Synonyms
- Sphegina notata Hull, 1935

Species of fly

Sphegina flavomaculata (Malloch 1922), the Tooth-legged Pufftail, is an uncommon species of syrphid fly observed in the northeastern United States. Hoverflies can remain nearly motionless in flight. The adults are also known as flower flies for they are commonly found on flowers, from which they get both energy-giving nectar and protein-rich pollen. Larvae found in accumulations of decaying sap under bark, usually in wet situations such as damp, shaded woodland and in partially submerged wood in streams and pools.
