= Sphegina rufa =

Scientific classification
- Kingdom: Animalia
- Phylum: Arthropoda
- Clade: Pancrustacea
- Class: Insecta
- Order: Diptera
- Family: Syrphidae
- Subfamily: Eristalinae
- Tribe: Brachyopini
- Subtribe: Spheginina
- Genus: Sphegina
- Species: S. rufa

Binomial name
- Sphegina rufa Malloch, 1922

Synonyms
- Sphegina armatipes var. rufa Malloch, 1922; Sphegina vittata Cole, 1924

Species of fly

Sphegina rufa is a species of hoverfly in the family Syrphidae.

== Distribution ==
United States.
