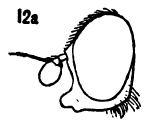
- hoverfly

Scientific classification
- Kingdom: Animalia
- Phylum: Arthropoda
- Clade: Pancrustacea
- Class: Insecta
- Order: Diptera
- Family: Syrphidae
- Subfamily: Eristalinae
- Tribe: Brachyopini
- Subtribe: Spheginina
- Genus: Sphegina
- Species: S. infuscata

Binomial name
- Sphegina infuscata Loew, 1863

Synonyms
- Sphegina pluto Hull, 1935

= Sphegina infuscata =

Species of fly

Sphegina infuscata is a species of hoverfly in the family Syrphidae.

== Distribution ==
Canada, United States.
