= Sphegina clavata =

Scientific classification
- Kingdom: Animalia
- Phylum: Arthropoda
- Clade: Pancrustacea
- Class: Insecta
- Order: Diptera
- Family: Syrphidae
- Subfamily: Eristalinae
- Tribe: Brachyopini
- Subtribe: Spheginina
- Genus: Sphegina
- Species: S. clavata

Binomial name
- Sphegina clavata (Scopoli, 1763)

Synonyms
- Conops clavatus Scopoli, 1763; Sphegina miciki Vujic, 1987

Species of fly

Sphegina clavata is a species of hoverfly in the family Syrphidae.

== Distribution ==
Slovenia.
