= Sphegina bridwelli =

Scientific classification
- Kingdom: Animalia
- Phylum: Arthropoda
- Clade: Pancrustacea
- Class: Insecta
- Order: Diptera
- Family: Syrphidae
- Subfamily: Eristalinae
- Tribe: Brachyopini
- Subtribe: Spheginina
- Genus: Sphegina
- Species: S. bridwelli

Binomial name
- Sphegina bridwelli Cole, 1924

Synonyms
- Sphegina cressoni Hull, 1935

Species of fly

Sphegina bridwelli is a species of hoverfly in the family Syrphidae.

== Distribution ==
Canada, United States.
