= Sphegina limbipennis =

Scientific classification
- Kingdom: Animalia
- Phylum: Arthropoda
- Clade: Pancrustacea
- Class: Insecta
- Order: Diptera
- Family: Syrphidae
- Subfamily: Eristalinae
- Tribe: Brachyopini
- Subtribe: Spheginina
- Genus: Sphegina
- Species: S. limbipennis

Binomial name
- Sphegina limbipennis Strobl, 1909

Species of fly

Sphegina limbipennis is a species of hoverfly.

== Distribution ==
Spain.
