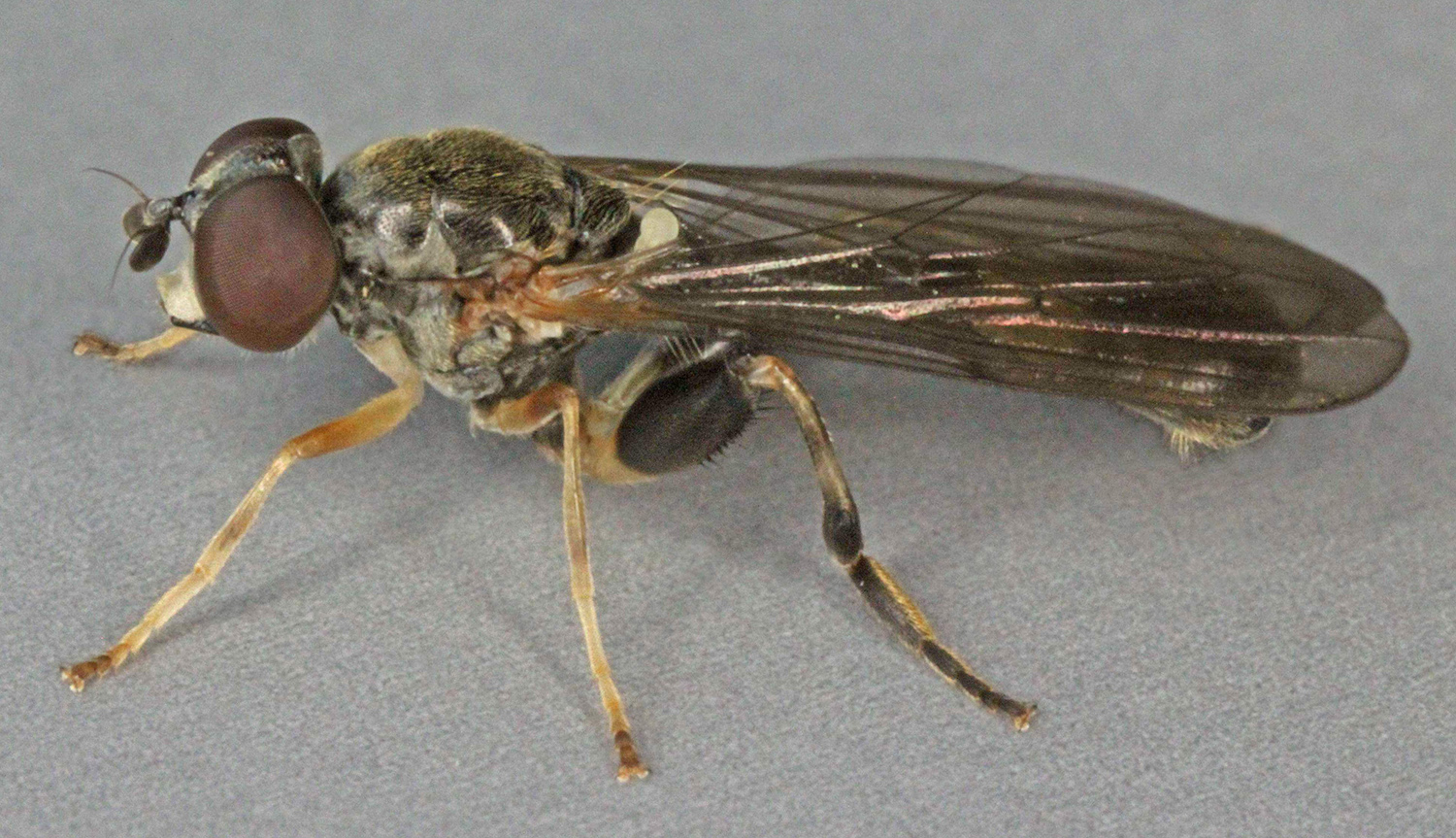
- Sphegina clunipes female Trawscoed, North Wales

Scientific classification
- Kingdom: Animalia
- Phylum: Arthropoda
- Clade: Pancrustacea
- Class: Insecta
- Order: Diptera
- Family: Syrphidae
- Subfamily: Eristalinae
- Tribe: Brachyopini
- Subtribe: Spheginina
- Genus: Sphegina
- Species: S. clunipes

Binomial name
- Sphegina clunipes (Fallen, 1816)

Synonyms
- Milesia clunipes Fallen, 1816; Sphegina flava Macquart, 1834; Sphegina nigricornis Macquart, 1829

= Sphegina clunipes =

Species of fly

Sphegina clunipes is a Palearctic species of hoverfly.

== Description ==
External images For terms see Morphology of Diptera
Males: The abdomen bulges only slightly at end. The width to tergite 4 about equal to length of sternite 4 and in the form of a slightly broadened rectangle toward back side, about twice as long as wide. Frons relatively broad. Surstyli narrow and long; length about four times width. Females: width of sternite 4 about 1.5 times length. Body length 6.0 to 7.0mm. See references for determination.

== Distribution ==
Palearctic Fennoscandia South to the Pyrenees and Spain. Ireland East through Central Europe and Southern Europe into European Russia and the Caucasus; through Siberia and the Russian Far East to Japan.

== Habitat ==
Woodland.

== Biology ==
Flies up to 2m from in dappled sunlight or shade at the edge of clearings, in woodland glades, along tracks and beside streams usually near water from May to September. Flowers visited include Cardamine pratensis, Crataegus, Euphorbia, Geranium pratense, Geranium robertianum, Potentilla erecta, Prunus spinosa, Ranunculus, Rubus fruticosus, Sanicula, Stachys, Veronica.
