= Sphegina lobulifera =

Scientific classification
- Kingdom: Animalia
- Phylum: Arthropoda
- Clade: Pancrustacea
- Class: Insecta
- Order: Diptera
- Family: Syrphidae
- Subfamily: Eristalinae
- Tribe: Brachyopini
- Subtribe: Spheginina
- Genus: Sphegina
- Species: S. lobulifera

Binomial name
- Sphegina lobulifera Malloch, 1922

Species of fly

Sphegina lobulifera (Malloch 1922), the Black-lobed Pufftail , is an rare species of syrphid fly observed in eastern North America.. Hoverflies can remain nearly motionless in flight. The adults are also known as flower flies since they are commonly found on flowers from which they get both energy-giving nectar and protein rich pollen. Larvae are found in accumulations of decaying sap under bark, usually in wet situations such as damp, shaded woodland and in partially submerged wood in streams and pools.
