= Sphegina albipes =

Scientific classification
- Kingdom: Animalia
- Phylum: Arthropoda
- Clade: Pancrustacea
- Class: Insecta
- Order: Diptera
- Family: Syrphidae
- Subfamily: Eristalinae
- Tribe: Brachyopini
- Subtribe: Spheginina
- Genus: Sphegina
- Species: S. albipes

Binomial name
- Sphegina albipes (Bigot, 1883)

Synonyms
- Ascia albipes Bigot, 1883; Sphegina melanderi Cole, 1924

Species of fly

Sphegina albipes is a species of hoverfly in the family Syrphidae.

== Distribution ==
United States.
