= Sphegina spheginea =

Scientific classification
- Kingdom: Animalia
- Phylum: Arthropoda
- Clade: Pancrustacea
- Class: Insecta
- Order: Diptera
- Family: Syrphidae
- Subfamily: Eristalinae
- Tribe: Brachyopini
- Subtribe: Spheginina
- Genus: Sphegina
- Species: S. spheginea

Binomial name
- Sphegina spheginea (Zetterstedt, 1838)

Synonyms
- Ascia spheginea Zetterstedt, 1838; Sphegina atra Violovich, 1980; Sphegina loewii Zeller, 1843; Sphegina rubripes Becker, 1921; Sphegina zetterstedti Schiner, 1857; Sphegina zetterstedtii var. rufiventris Strobl, 1910

Species of fly

Sphegina spheginea is a species of hoverfly in the family Syrphidae.

== Distribution ==
Sweden.
