= Sphegina verecunda =

Scientific classification
- Kingdom: Animalia
- Phylum: Arthropoda
- Clade: Pancrustacea
- Class: Insecta
- Order: Diptera
- Family: Syrphidae
- Subfamily: Eristalinae
- Tribe: Brachyopini
- Subtribe: Spheginina
- Genus: Sphegina
- Species: S. verecunda

Binomial name
- Sphegina verecunda Collin, 1937

Species of fly

Sphegina verecunda is a species of hoverfly in the family Syrphidae.

== Distribution ==
England.
