= Sphegina kurenzovi =

Scientific classification
- Kingdom: Animalia
- Phylum: Arthropoda
- Clade: Pancrustacea
- Class: Insecta
- Order: Diptera
- Family: Syrphidae
- Subfamily: Eristalinae
- Tribe: Brachyopini
- Subtribe: Spheginina
- Genus: Sphegina
- Species: S. kurenzovi

Binomial name
- Sphegina kurenzovi Mutin, 1984

Species of fly

Sphegina kurenzovi is a species of hoverfly in the family Syrphidae.

== Distribution ==
Russia.
