= Sphegina petiolata =

Scientific classification
- Kingdom: Animalia
- Phylum: Arthropoda
- Clade: Pancrustacea
- Class: Insecta
- Order: Diptera
- Family: Syrphidae
- Subfamily: Eristalinae
- Tribe: Brachyopini
- Subtribe: Spheginina
- Genus: Sphegina
- Species: S. petiolata

Binomial name
- Sphegina petiolata Coquillett, 1910

Species of fly

Sphegina petiolata (Coquillett, 1910), the Long-spined Pufftail, is an uncommon species of syrphid fly observed in eastern to central North America. Hoverflies can remain nearly motionless in flight. The adults are also known as flower flies for they are commonly found on flowers, from which they get both energy-giving nectar and protein-rich pollen. Larvae found in accumulations of decaying sap under bark, usually in wet situations such as damp, shaded woodland and in partially submerged wood in streams and pools.
