= Sphegina lobata =

Scientific classification
- Kingdom: Animalia
- Phylum: Arthropoda
- Clade: Pancrustacea
- Class: Insecta
- Order: Diptera
- Family: Syrphidae
- Subfamily: Eristalinae
- Tribe: Brachyopini
- Subtribe: Spheginina
- Genus: Sphegina
- Species: S. lobata

Binomial name
- Sphegina lobata Loew, 1863

Synonyms
- Sphegina monticola Malloch, 1922

Species of fly

Sphegina lobata (Loew 1863), the Yellow-lobed Pufftail, is an uncommon species of syrphid fly observed in northeastern North America. Hoverflies can remain nearly motionless in flight. The adults are also known as flower flies for they are commonly found on flowers, from which they get both energy-giving nectar and protein-rich pollen. Larvae found in accumulations of decaying sap under bark, usually in wet situations such as damp, shaded woodland and in partially submerged wood in streams and pools.

== Distribution ==
Canada, United States
