= Sphegina alaoglui =

Scientific classification
- Kingdom: Animalia
- Phylum: Arthropoda
- Clade: Pancrustacea
- Class: Insecta
- Order: Diptera
- Family: Syrphidae
- Subfamily: Eristalinae
- Tribe: Brachyopini
- Subtribe: Spheginina
- Genus: Sphegina
- Species: S. alaoglui

Binomial name
- Sphegina alaoglui Hayat, 1997

Species of fly

Sphegina alaoglui is a species of syrphid fly in the family Syrphidae.

== Distribution ==
Turkey.
