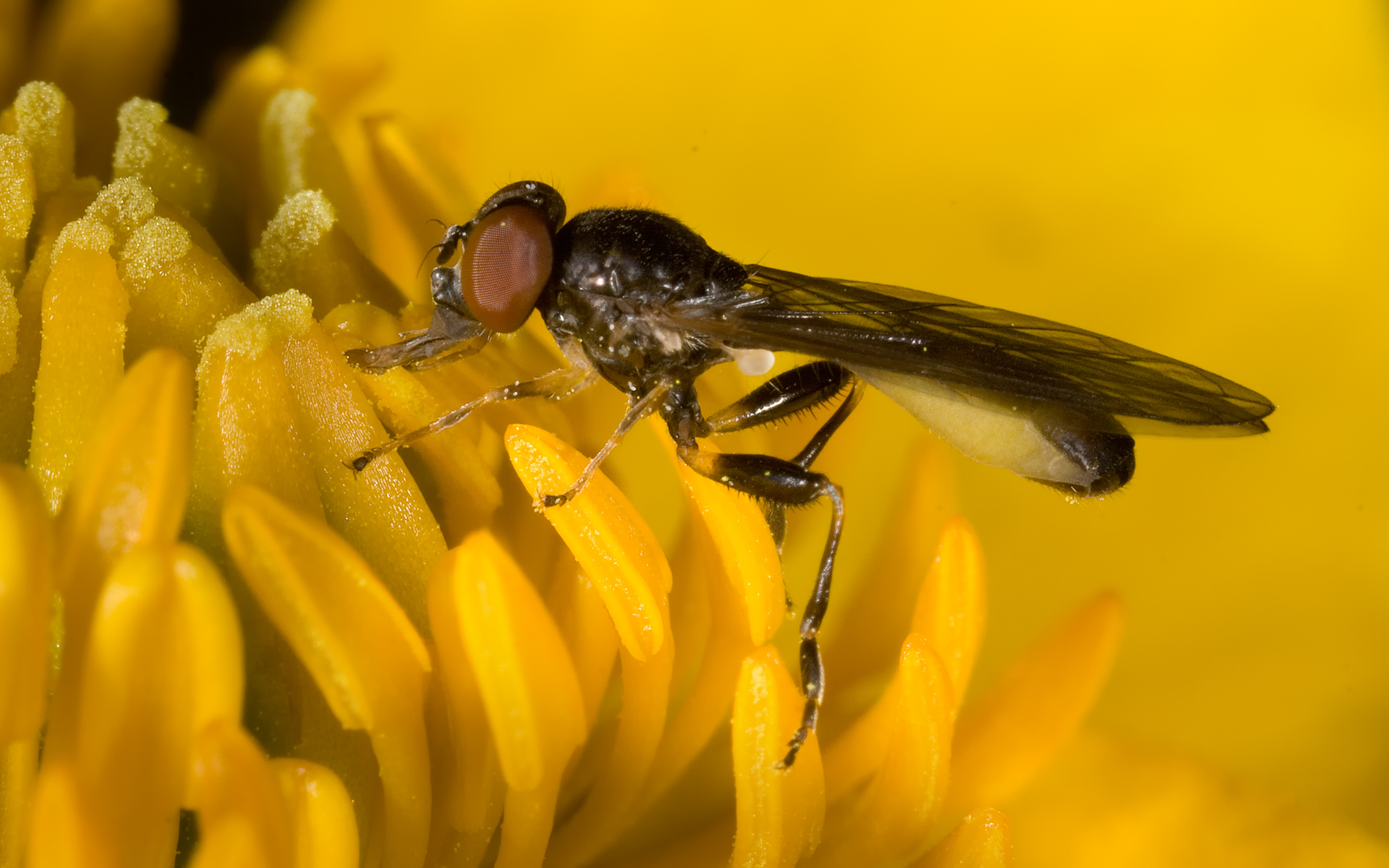
- Sphegina montana

Scientific classification
- Kingdom: Animalia
- Phylum: Arthropoda
- Clade: Pancrustacea
- Class: Insecta
- Order: Diptera
- Family: Syrphidae
- Subfamily: Eristalinae
- Tribe: Brachyopini
- Subtribe: Spheginina
- Genus: Sphegina; Meigen, 1822

Type species
- Milesia clunipes Fallén, 1816

Subgenera
- Asiosphegina Stackelberg, 1974; Sphegina Meigen, 1822

Synonyms
- Marsupium Swinderen, 1822; Sphecina Agassiz, 1846; Humatrix Gistel, 1848; Sphoegina Rondani, 1857

= Sphegina =

Genus of flies

Sphegina is a genus of small, slender hoverflies. They are widespread throughout Eurasia and North America. In flight they seem to have long hind legs which they often carry hanging down, making them resemble sphecid or ichneumonid wasps. Adult Sphegina are usually found in damp and shady habitats close to water in forested areas, and several species can often be found together. They often feed on white and yellow flowers of Apiaceae, Ranunculaceae, Asteraceae, and Rosaceae like Crataegus, Sorbus, and Sorbaria. Larvae nest in the sap of living and dead trees or in decaying cambium under tree bark lying in water or other damp conditions. The larvae of some species have been discovered in the tunnels of other xylophagous insects.

Sphegina generally have a face strongly concave and bare in both sexes, antennal basoflagellomere oval with a long dorsal and pilose arista; eyes bare and dichoptic in both sexes; postpronotum pilose; metasternum and katepisternum non-pilose; ventral scutellar fringe absent; alula narrow or absent; postmetacoxal bridge complete and broad; metaleg much longer than pro- and mesoleg and with incrassate femur; abdomen petiolate. Sphegina are similar to the species of their sister group Neoascia but are distinguished by the following characters: face oblique, nearly straight, laterally pilose; katepisternum usually pilose; basoflagellomere usually elongate, longer than wide; arista bare and about as long as basoflagellomere. The small-sized species of Sphegina can be very similar to Neoascia in habitus and they may be especially difficult to distinguish in the wild.

Sphegina has two subgenera Asiosphegina and Sphegina.

== Species ==
Subgenus: Sphegina Meigen, 1822

- Sphegina abbreviata Steenis, Hippa & Mutin, 2018
- Sphegina alaoglui Hayat, 1997
- Sphegina albipes (Bigot, 1883)
- Sphegina amurensis Mutin, 1984
- Sphegina anatolii Mutin, 1999
- Sphegina angustata Steenis, Hippa & Mutin, 2018
- Sphegina appalachiensis Coovert, 1977
- Sphegina armatipes Malloch, 1922
- Sphegina aterrima Stackelberg, 1953
- Sphegina atrolutea Lucas in Thompson & Torp, 1986
- Sphegina biannulata Malloch, 1922
- Sphegina brachygaster Hull, 1935
- Sphegina brevisterna Violovich, 1980
- Sphegina bridwelli Cole, 1924
- Sphegina californica Malloch, 1922
- Sphegina calthae Mutin, 1984
- Sphegina campanulata Robertson, 1901
- Sphegina carbonaria Mutin, 1998
- Sphegina catthae Mutin, 1984
- Sphegina clavata (Scopoli, 1763)
- Sphegina claviventris Stackelberg, 1956
- Sphegina clunipes (Fallén, 1816)
- Sphegina cornifera Becker, 1921
- Sphegina dogieli Stackelberg, 1953
- Sphegina elegans Schummel, 1843
- Sphegina elongata Shiraki & Edashige, 1953
- Sphegina fasciata Shiraki, 1968
- Sphegina flavimana Malloch, 1922
- Sphegina flavomaculata Malloch, 1922
- Sphegina grunini Stackelberg, 1953
- Sphegina guptai Mutin, 1998
- Sphegina hansoni Thompson, 1966
- Sphegina hennigiana Stackelberg, 1956
- Sphegina hodosa Violovich, 1981
- Sphegina infuscata Loew, 1863
- Sphegina japonica Shiraki & Edashige, 1953
- Sphegina javana Meijere, 1914
- Sphegina keeniana Williston, 1887
- Sphegina kumaoniensis Mutin, 1998
- Sphegina kurenzovi Mutin, 1984
- Sphegina latifrons Egger, 1865
- Sphegina limbipennis Strobl, 1909
- Sphegina lobata Loew, 1863
- Sphegina lobulifera Malloch, 1922
- Sphegina melancholica Stackelberg, 1956
- Sphegina micangensis Huo, Ren & Zheng, 2007
- Sphegina mikado Mutin, 2001
- Sphegina montana Becker, 1921
- Sphegina negrobovi Skufjin, 1976
- Sphegina nigrapicula Huo, Ren & Zheng, 2007
- Sphegina nigerrima Shiraki, 1930
- Sphegina nigra Meigen, 1822
- Sphegina nigrimanus Cole, 1924
- Sphegina obscurifacies Stackelberg, 1956
- Sphegina occidentalis Malloch, 1922
- Sphegina petiolata Coquillett, 1910
- Sphegina platychira Szilády, 1937
- Sphegina pontica Mutin, 1998
- Sphegina potanini Stackelberg, 1953
- Sphegina punctata Cole, 1921
- Sphegina quadrisetae Huo & Ren, 2006
- Sphegina rufa Malloch, 1922
- Sphegina rufiventris Loew, 1863
- Sphegina smirnovi Violovich in Stackelberg, 1953
- Sphegina spheginea (Zetterstedt, 1838)
- Sphegina spiniventris Stackelberg, 1953
- Sphegina stackelbergi Violovich, 1980
- Sphegina sublatifrons Vujic, 1990
- Sphegina taibaishanensis Huo & Ren, 2006
- Sphegina tenuifemorata Mutin, 1984
- Sphegina thoraciaca Shiraki, 1968
- Sphegina tricoloripes Brunetti, 1915
- Sphegina tristriata Brunetti, 1913
- Sphegina tuvinica Violovich, 1980
- Sphegina uncinata Hippa, Steenis & Mutin, 2015
- Sphegina univittata Huo, Ren & Zheng, 2007
- Sphegina varidissima Shiraki, 1930
- Sphegina varifacies Kassebeer, 1991
- Sphegina verae Mutin, 1984
- Sphegina verecunda Collin, 1937
- Sphegina violovitshi Stackelberg, 1956

Subgenus: Asiosphegina Stackelberg, 1974

- Sphegina achaeta Hippa, Steenis & Mutin, 2015
- Sphegina adusta Hippa, Steenis & Mutin, 2015
- Sphegina amplistylus Steenis, Hippa & Mutin, 2018
- Sphegina atricolor Hippa, Steenis & Mutin, 2015
- Sphegina atrimanus Steenis, Hippa & Mutin, 2018
- Sphegina bidens Hippa, Steenis & Mutin, 2015
- Sphegina bifida Steenis, Hippa & Mutin, 2018
- Sphegina bilobata Hippa, Steenis & Mutin, 2015
- Sphegina bracon Steenis, Hippa & Mutin, 2018
- Sphegina brevipilus Steenis, Hippa & Mutin, 2018
- Sphegina carinata Hippa, Steenis & Mutin, 2015
- Sphegina cerina Hippa, Steenis & Mutin, 2015
- Sphegina clavigera Steenis, Hippa & Mutin, 2018
- Sphegina collicola Steenis, Hippa & Mutin, 2018
- Sphegina crassispina Hippa, Steenis & Mutin, 2015
- Sphegina crinita Steenis, Hippa & Mutin, 2018
- Sphegina crucivena Hippa, Steenis & Mutin, 2015
- Sphegina culex Hippa, Steenis & Mutin, 2015
- Sphegina cultrigera Hippa, Steenis & Mutin, 2015
- Sphegina dentata Steenis, Hippa & Mutin, 2018
- Sphegina distincta Steenis, Hippa & Mutin, 2018
- Sphegina ensifera Hippa, Steenis & Mutin, 2015
- Sphegina exilipes Steenis, Hippa & Mutin, 2018
- Sphegina falcata Hippa, Steenis & Mutin, 2015
- Sphegina farinosa Steenis, Hippa & Mutin, 2018
- Sphegina fimbriata Steenis, Hippa & Mutin, 2018
- Sphegina forceps Hippa, Steenis & Mutin, 2015
- Sphegina forficata Hippa, Steenis & Mutin, 2015
- Sphegina freyana Stackelberg, 1956
- Sphegina furcillata Steenis, Hippa & Mutin, 2018
- Sphegina furva Hippa, Steenis & Mutin, 2015
- Sphegina ghatsi Steenis, Hippa & Mutin, 2018
- Sphegina gigantea Steenis, Hippa & Mutin, 2018
- Sphegina gigas Hippa, Steenis & Mutin, 2015
- Sphegina granditarsis Steenis, Hippa & Mutin, 2018
- Sphegina hamulata Steenis, Hippa & Mutin, 2018
- Sphegina hauseri Steenis, Hippa & Mutin, 2018
- Sphegina incretonigra Steenis, Hippa & Mutin, 2018
- Sphegina index Hippa, Steenis & Mutin, 2015
- Sphegina inflata Steenis, Hippa & Mutin, 2018
- Sphegina inventum Steenis, Hippa & Mutin, 2018
- Sphegina karnataka Steenis, Hippa & Mutin, 2018
- Sphegina licina Steenis, Hippa & Mutin, 2018
- Sphegina lobulata Steenis, Hippa & Mutin, 2018
- Sphegina lucida Steenis, Hippa & Mutin, 2018
- Sphegina malaisei Hippa, Steenis & Mutin, 2015
- Sphegina minuta Hippa, Steenis & Mutin, 2015
- Sphegina mirifica Hippa, Steenis & Mutin, 2015
- Sphegina nasuta Hippa, Steenis & Mutin, 2015
- Sphegina nigrotarsata Steenis, Hippa & Mutin, 2018
- Sphegina nitidifrons Stackelberg, 1956
- Sphegina nubicola Steenis, Hippa & Mutin, 2018
- Sphegina orientalis Kertész, 1914
- Sphegina ornata Steenis, Hippa & Mutin, 2018
- Sphegina parvula Hippa, Steenis & Mutin, 2015
- Sphegina perlobata Steenis, Hippa & Mutin, 2018
- Sphegina philippina Thompson, 1999
- Sphegina plautus Steenis, Hippa & Mutin, 2018
- Sphegina pollex Hippa, Steenis & Mutin, 2015
- Sphegina pollinosa Hippa, Steenis & Mutin, 2015
- Sphegina prolixa Steenis, Hippa & Mutin, 2018
- Sphegina pusilla Hippa, Steenis & Mutin, 2015
- Sphegina radula Hippa, Steenis & Mutin, 2015
- Sphegina raduloides Hippa, Steenis & Mutin, 2015
- Sphegina setosa Steenis, Hippa & Mutin, 2018
- Sphegina sibirica Stackelberg, 1953
- Sphegina siculifera Hippa, Steenis & Mutin, 2015
- Sphegina simplex Hippa, Steenis & Mutin, 2015
- Sphegina sinesmila Hippa, Steenis & Mutin, 2015
- Sphegina spathigera Steenis, Hippa & Mutin, 2018
- Sphegina spenceri Steenis, Hippa & Mutin, 2018
- Sphegina strigillata Steenis, Hippa & Mutin, 2018
- Sphegina subradula Hippa, Steenis & Mutin, 2015
- Sphegina taiwanensis Steenis, Hippa & Mutin, 2018
- Sphegina trichaeta Hippa, Steenis & Mutin, 2015
- Sphegina trispina Hippa, Steenis & Mutin, 2015
- Sphegina umbrosa Steenis, Hippa & Mutin, 2018
- Sphegina uncinata Hippa, Steenis & Mutin, 2015
- Sphegina verrucosa Steenis, Hippa & Mutin, 2018
- Sphegina vietnamensis Steenis, Hippa & Mutin, 2018
