= Sphegina distincta =

Scientific classification
- Kingdom: Animalia
- Phylum: Arthropoda
- Clade: Pancrustacea
- Class: Insecta
- Order: Diptera
- Family: Syrphidae
- Subfamily: Eristalinae
- Tribe: Brachyopini
- Subtribe: Spheginina
- Genus: Sphegina
- Species: S. distincta

Binomial name
- Sphegina distincta Steenis, Hippa & Mutin, 2018

Species of fly

Sphegina distincta is a species of hoverfly in the family Syrphidae found in Vietnam. It vaguely resembles other Oriental species of Sphegina that have strong spinose setae at the posterior margin of sternum IV, but is not especially similar to any of them.

== Etymology ==
The name comes from Latin ‘distincta’, meaning ‘different’, referring to the unusually extensive yellow color of the fly.

== Description ==
In male specimens, body length is 8.4-9.9 millimeters. The wings are 5.8-6.5 millimeters, entirely microtrichose, hyaline, with yellowish stigma. The face is concave with a weakly developed frontal prominence; dark brown, ventral half light-brown to dark or entirely yellow.
