= Sphegina quadrisetae =

Scientific classification
- Kingdom: Animalia
- Phylum: Arthropoda
- Clade: Pancrustacea
- Class: Insecta
- Order: Diptera
- Family: Syrphidae
- Subfamily: Eristalinae
- Tribe: Brachyopini
- Subtribe: Spheginina
- Genus: Sphegina
- Species: S. quadrisetae

Binomial name
- Sphegina quadrisetae Huo & Ren, 2006

Species of fly

Sphegina quadrisetae is a species of hoverfly in the family Syrphidae found in China. It's characterized by the long black pile posterior of the posteromedial corner of the eye, the scutellum with four long black setae at posterior margin, and the black and extremely strongly antero-ventrally projected face.

== Etymology ==
The name comes from Latin 'quad', meaning 'four', referring to the four long black setae on its scutellum at posterior margin.

== Description ==
In female specimens, the body length is 6.9 millimeters and the wing length is 7.2 millimeters. The face is concave, unusually strongly projected antero-ventrally, with the frontal prominence very strongly developed. The head is entirely black; the face is yellow with long, soft hairs along the eye-margin; occiput dark brown; antenna dark brown with black setae dorsally on scape and pedicel; thorax black; scutellum black and subtriangular; legs yellow; all tarsi and apical ⅓ of metatibia black. The metatibia is without apicoventral dens, the metafemur is very weakly incrassate, and the metatarsus has a very thin basal tarsomere. A narrow fascia posterior of the lunula is non-pollinose and shiny. The basal flagellomere is slightly oval, and the arista is almost three times as long as the basal flagellomere and covered in long, soft hairs.
