= Sphegina bilobata =

Scientific classification
- Kingdom: Animalia
- Phylum: Arthropoda
- Clade: Pancrustacea
- Class: Insecta
- Order: Diptera
- Family: Syrphidae
- Genus: Sphegina
- Species: S. bilobata

Binomial name
- Sphegina bilobata Hippa, Steenis & Mutin, 2015

Species of fly

Sphegina (Asiosphegina) bilobata is a species of hoverfly in the family Syrphidae found in Myanmar. It's set apart from other species by its general pale yellowish color with three black longitudinal stripes on the scutum combined with the infuscated pattern at cross veins on the wing. The male sternite IV with its symmetrical pair of short spinose lobes posteriorly is quite distinct.

== Description ==
In male specimens, body length is 7.5 to 7.8 millimeters and wing length is 6.0 to 6.2 millimeters. The face is yellow, strongly concave with a strongly developed, brownish frontal prominence. The gena is shiny yellow; frons and vertex dull black; lunula yellow; occiput dull black; antenna entirely yellow; thorax dull yellow or yellowish; scutellum yellow or yellowish brown, shiny, trapezoid; pro- and mesoleg yellowish; protarsus and tarsomere 5 on mesotarsus brown; metaleg with coxa brownish, trochanter yellow, femur yellow with the apical 1/6 brownish and a ventrally interrupted annulus on the basal 1/2 weakly brownish, tibia with an apico-ventral tooth, colour yellow except the apical 1/5 brown and an annulus on the basal 1/2 brownish, tarsus brown. The wings are hyaline with yellowish stigma and brownish pattern. The basal flagellomere is enlarged, nearly 1.5 times as long as broad, and the arista is short and pilose.

Female specimens are much the same except for normal sexual dimorphism; body length is 8.4 millimeters and wing length is 7.5 millimeters. Protarsus yellow with tarsomere 5 obscure brownish yellow. Metaleg paler than in the male; femur almost entirely yellow, tibia without a distinct apico-ventral tooth, with brownish sub-basal annulus and apex; tarsus brownish dorsally. The abdomen is entirely yellow.
