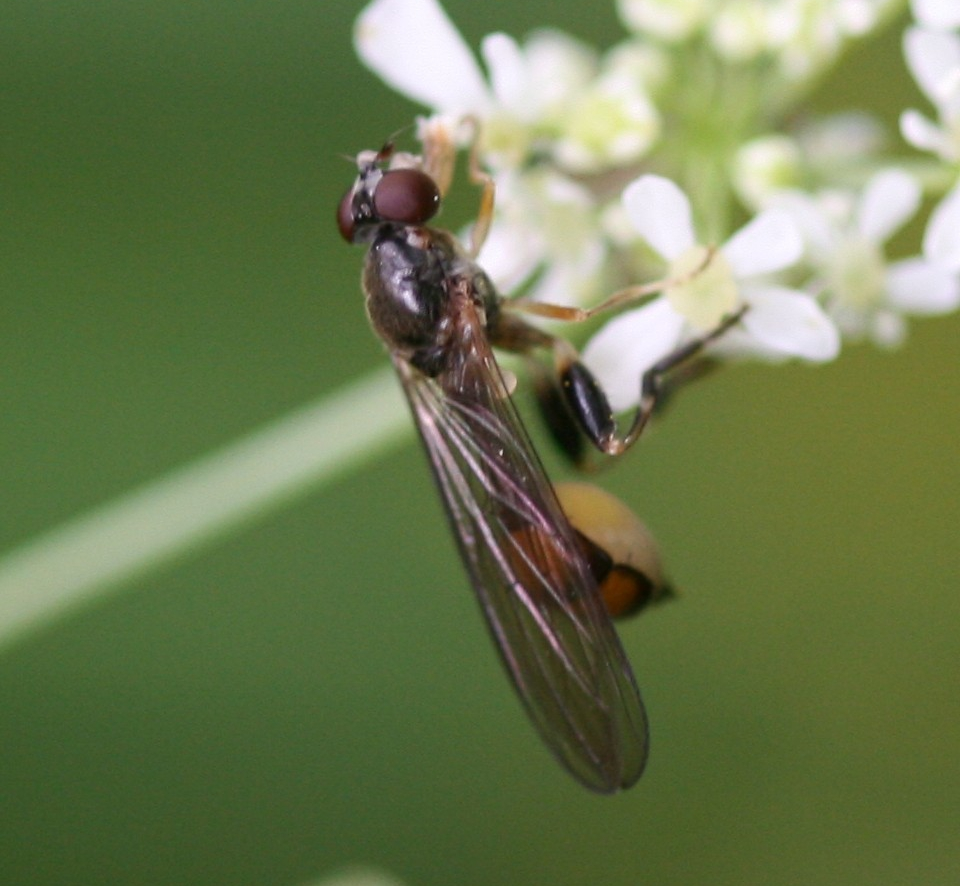
- Sphegina elegans female

Scientific classification
- Kingdom: Animalia
- Phylum: Arthropoda
- Clade: Pancrustacea
- Class: Insecta
- Order: Diptera
- Family: Syrphidae
- Subfamily: Eristalinae
- Tribe: Brachyopini
- Subtribe: Spheginina
- Genus: Sphegina
- Species: S. elegans

Binomial name
- Sphegina elegans Schummel, 1843

Synonyms
- Sphegina kimakowiczi Strobl, 1897; Sphegina germanica Becker, 1921; Sphegina tenuissima Szilády, 1939

= Sphegina elegans =

Species of fly

Sphegina elegans is a species of hoverfly.

== Description ==
External images For terms see Morphology of Diptera
Wing length 5-6·75 mm. Humerus pale, yellow or orange. 3rd antennomere large. Mesonotum shining black, pollinose only on margins. Tarsi 1 and 2 pale. Wing hyaline. See references for determination.

== Distribution ==
Palearctic Fennoscandia South to the Pyrenees and Spain. Ireland East through Central Europe and Southern Europe (northern Italy, the former Yugoslavia, northern Greece) into European Russia to the Caucasus mountains. Also Samos (Greece).

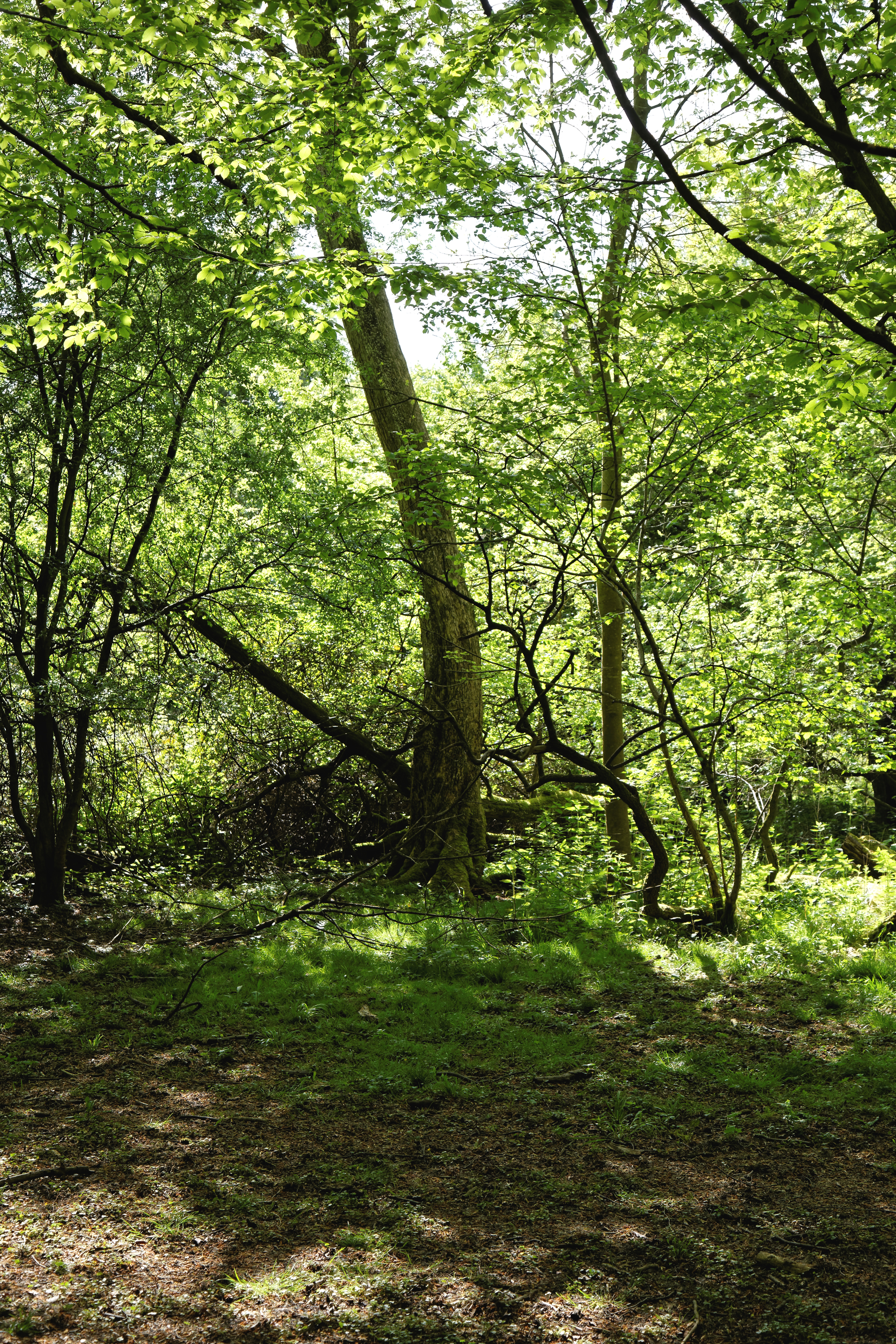
Habitat.England.

== Biology ==
Habitat: Fagus and Quercus and other woodland, flying in partial shade and near streams.
