= Aleksandr Stackelberg =

Russian entomologist (1897–1975)

Aleksandr Aleksandrovich Stackelberg (sometimes Shtakel'berg; Russian: Александр Александрович Штакельберг; 1897–1975) was a Russian entomologist.

Stackelberg was born in St. Petersburg and specialised on Diptera, notably Syrphidae. He joined the staff of the Zoological Museum of the Academy of Sciences in 1920, and in 1929 he was made the director of the Diptera Division. From 1942 he was the head of the Department of Entomology. He taught entomology to I. A. Rubtsov, B. B. Rohdendorf, Ye. N. Savchenko, and N. A. Violovitch. He wrote over 160 scientific papers.

== Selected works ==
=== Fauna USSR series ===
- 1970 Family Milichiidae. Keys to the Insects of the European Part of the USSR; Diptera and Siphonaptera. [In Russian; English translation published in 1988 by the Smithsonian Institution Libraries and the National Science Foundation. New Delhi: Amerind Publishing Comp., Pvt. Ltd.. 5(2):593-601.
- 1970. Family Tethinidae. Keys to the Insects of the European Part of the USSR; Diptera and Siphonaptera. [In Russian; English translation published in 1988 by the Smithsonian Institution Libraries and the National Science Foundation. New Delhi: Amerind Publishing Comp., Pvt. Ltd.. 5(2):355-356.
- 1970. Family Canacidae. Keys to the Insects of the European Part of the USSR; Diptera and Siphonaptera. [In Russian; English translation published in 1988 by the Smithsonian Institution Libraries and the National Science Foundation. New Delhi: Amerind Publishing Comp., Pvt. Ltd.. 5(2):602-603
- Gutsevich, A. V., A. S. Monchadsky and A. A. Stackelberg 1974. Fauna of the U.S.S.R. Diptera Volume III No. 4

Mosquitoes Family Culicidae. 408 pp. Translated and reprinted from Akad. Nauk SSSR Zool. Inst. No. 100. 1971, 384 pp. [Translation by Rose Lavoott, ed by Prof. O. Theodor. Israel Program for Scientific Translations, Jerusalem, 1974.]

=== Other ===
- Stackelberg, A.A. (1924) Syrphidarum novarum palaearcticarum diagnoses. Wiener entomologische Zeitung 41, 25-29.
- Stackelberg, A (1929): Beiträge zur Kenntnis der paläarktischen Syrphiden. I.[Contributions for the knowledge of the Palearctic Syrphiden. I.] Rev. Rusa. Entom. XXIII. nos. 3-4
- Stackelberg, A (1930): Beiträge zur Kenntnis der paläarktischen Syrphiden. II.[Contributions for the knowledge of the Palearctic Syrphiden. II.] Zool. Anzeiger Bd. 90. Heft 3/4
- Stackelberg, A (1930): Beiträge zur Kenntnis der paläarktischen Syrphiden. III.[Contributions for the knowledge of the Palearctic Syrphiden. III.] Konowia Bd. IX. Heft 3.
