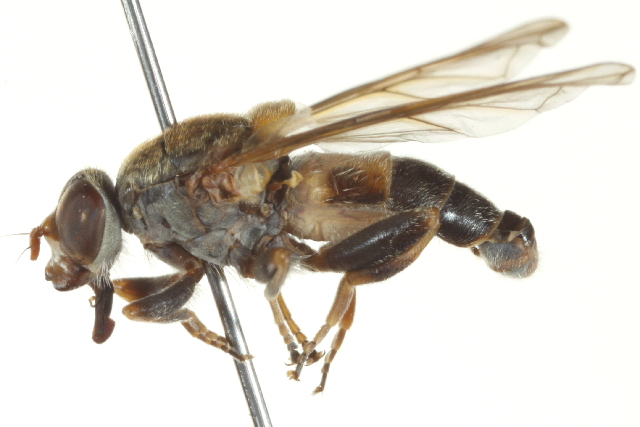

Scientific classification
- Kingdom: Animalia
- Phylum: Arthropoda
- Clade: Pancrustacea
- Class: Insecta
- Order: Diptera
- Family: Syrphidae
- Subfamily: Eristalinae
- Tribe: Brachyopini
- Subtribe: Brachyopina
- Genus: Brachyopa
- Species: B. cinereovittata

Binomial name
- Brachyopa cinereovittata Bigot, 1884

Synonyms
- Brachyopa basilaris Curran, 1922

= Brachyopa cinereovittata =

Species of fly

Brachyopa cinereovittata, the Grey-striped Sapeater, is a rare species of syrphid fly. It has been observed in northwestern North America. Hoverflies get their names from the ability to remain nearly motionless while in flight. The adults are also known as flower flies for they are commonly found around and on flowers, from which they get both energy-giving nectar and protein-rich pollen. Larvae for this genus are of the rat-tailed type. B.cinereovittata larvae have not been described.

== Description ==
For terms see Morphology of Diptera.

Size

9 mm (0.35 in)

Head

The frons is black that is only visible in a median longitudinal stripe and just above the reddish color.The lower part of the face is polished luteous reddish. The upper portion is densely greyish yellow pollinose, the pollen extending along the narrow orbital margins to join that on the occiput below the eyes, and also narrowly upwards along the eyes to join the more yellow pollen of the front. In profile the face is triangularly excavated, the epistoma not quite as prominent as the antennal base. The facial side margins have very short, sparse white pile., The front has longer, subappressed, whitish pile. The antenna are reddish;.The brown :arista is bare or with very short pubescent. The antennal prominence is wholly polished luteous reddish.The eyes are Holoptic in the male. The occiput is yellowish grey pollinose. with long whitish pile.

Thorax

The scutum is opaque brownish grey; with two narrow, median, longitudinal, posteriorly somewhat divergent, shining brown stripes on the anterior two-thirds. There are broader, interrupted ones on either side with an area of the same color above the base of the wings. The humeri are reddish yellow The postalar calli reddish yellow The scutellum is reddish yellow, the latter with a similar pile to that on the thorax. The pleurae are almost all reddish, with sub-obscuring whitish pile pallidly brassy and subappressed.

Wings

The wings are pale yellowish with yellow veins. Only the apical cross-veins are brown. The squamae are pallidly yellow, the fringe more yellowish. The halteres are yellow. M1 outwardly oblique vein R_{4+5} with apical section shorter than crossvein r-m

Legs

The femora are luteous basally and apically, with a diffuse brown medially. The hind femora has two rows of black bristles on the lower part of the apical half. The tibia are yellow with dirty brownish bands on the apical third. The tarsi are yellow, with the last two segments black.

Abdomen

The first two abdominal segments wholly reddish; the third segment shining reddish brown, the apex in the middle portion somewhat reddish; the fourth and fifth shining blackish brown, the apices narrowly luteous. The pile pale yellowish, although there appear, in some lights, incomplete black pilose fascise on the bases of the third and fourth segments.
