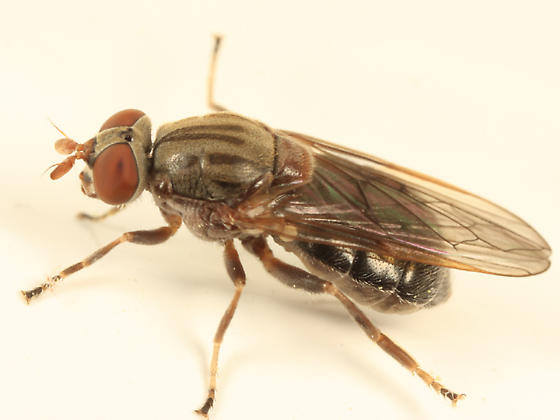
- Female

Scientific classification
- Kingdom: Animalia
- Phylum: Arthropoda
- Clade: Pancrustacea
- Class: Insecta
- Order: Diptera
- Family: Syrphidae
- Subfamily: Eristalinae
- Tribe: Brachyopini
- Subtribe: Brachyopina
- Genus: Brachyopa
- Species: B. daeckei

Binomial name
- Brachyopa daeckei Johnson, 1917

Synonyms
- Brachyopa nigricauda Curran, 1922

= Brachyopa daeckei =

Species of fly

Brachyopa daeckei (Johnson, 1917), the black-tailed sapeater, is a rare species of syrphid fly that has been observed in northeastern North America. Hoverflies get their names from the ability to remain nearly motionless while in flight. The adults are also known as flower flies for they are commonly found around and on flowers, from which they get both energy-giving nectar and protein-rich pollen. Larvae for this genus are of the rat-tailed type. B.daeckei larvae have not been described.

== Description ==
For terms see Morphology of Diptera.

Size

6–7 mm (0.24–0.28 in)

Head

The frons is black with grayish pollen and black shining spots above the base of the antennae and around the ocelli. The face is yellowish gray pollinose, concealing the dirty yellowish ground color. The lower half of the face is bare laterally, but on each side of the anterior oral margin is a less thickly pollinose area. There is a darker spot at the interior angle of the pollen and another below the eyes. The lateral facial stripes are distinct and reaching quite as high as the base of the antennae. The face is moderately concave, while the epistoma is not quite as much produced as the antennal prominence. The latter dirty luteous above apically, its base blackish brown. The face is without pile and the cheeks (gena) and lower half of the occiput with sparse, short, white pile. The upper half of the occiput and front with very short black pile. Eyes bare Holoptic in the male. The antennae are ferruginous red. The flagellum is a large, brown, elongate oval. The arista is brown, with its basal third reddish and not distinctly pubescent. The occiput is wide and yellowish gray pollinose.

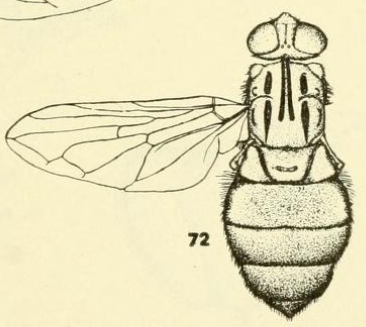
Brachyopa daeckei dorsal female

Thorax

The scutum is grayish pollinose, with five sub-shining lines, the three inner ones slightly diverging, but not reaching the scutellum. The humeri are ferruginous reddish, The scutellum basal half is diffuse reddish-brown with a conspicuous preapical depression and pale pile. The pleurae are brownish grayish pollinose, in areas moderately covered with white pollen. The katepisternum is pilose on the dorsal half.

Wings

Wings hyaline, slightly yellow with brown veins. The anterior cross-vein (r-m) is slightly clouded with brown. The stigma is yellow. The squamae calypters are white with yellow border and pallid fringe. The halteres are yellow. M1 is outwardly oblique. Vein R_{4+5} with apical section shorter than crossvein r-m.

Legs

The legs have a reddish brown ground color. There is yellow on the femora bases and apices. The bases and narrow apices of the tibiae are yellow. All the front tarsi and last two segments of the mid and hind tarsi are black. The pile is shining yellowish, obscuring the reddish brown ground color somewhat.

Abdomen

The abdomen is uniformly reddish brown to black, with white pile. The apex of the fifth segment obscurely reddish. Abdominal pile wholly short, fine, sparse, white. The venter is rather blackish, with thin grayish white pollen and the incisures are reddish. Second and third abdominal segments with posterior pollinose bands. All the abdominal segments with roundish shining bare spots on each side.
