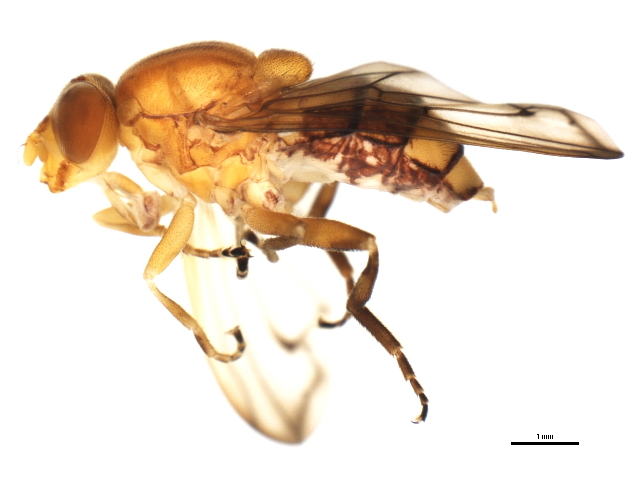

Scientific classification
- Kingdom: Animalia
- Phylum: Arthropoda
- Clade: Pancrustacea
- Class: Insecta
- Order: Diptera
- Family: Syrphidae
- Subfamily: Eristalinae
- Tribe: Brachyopini
- Subtribe: Brachyopina
- Genus: Brachyopa
- Species: B. caesariata

Binomial name
- Brachyopa caesariata Moran & Skevington, 2019

= Brachyopa caesariata =

Species of fly

Brachyopa caesariata (Moran & Skevington, 2019), the Plain-winged Sapeater, is an uncommon species of syrphid fly. It has been observed in Canada, Alaska and northern United States. Hoverflies get their names from the ability to remain nearly motionless while in flight. The adults are also known as flower flies for they are commonly found around and on flowers, from which they get both energy-giving nectar and protein-rich pollen. Larvae for this genus are of the rat-tailed type. B.caesariata larvae have not been described. (as species 78-2)

== Description ==
For terms see Morphology of Diptera.
external link to images

Size 5–8 mm (0.2–0.3 in)

Head

The frontal triangle is shiny, bare except for gold pollinosity narrowly along the eye margin. The vertex is yellow, bare and gold pollinose, except ocellar triangle pale pilose. The female frons is completely golden pollinose between eyes. The face is concave behind the antennae and, covered in white pollen but without pile. The lower face projects forwards along the oral margin. The gena are pale pilose, shiny anteriorly and gold pollinose posteriorly. The eyes are bare, broadly holoptic in the male. The antennae: are wholly golden yellow to orange. The scape and pedicel have short, pale pile. The pedicel is about as long as scape. The postpedicel is oval, nearly round, with a distinct sensory pit on the inner surface. The arista is pubescent but not plumose. The occiput is gold pollinose with pale pile and some short black setae dorsally.

Thorax

The scutum is yellow to orange. The pile of the scutum are, pale, black or mixed pale and black. The scutum is colored with gold pollen except for two medial, bare stripes starting at anterior edge and running about three-fourths the length of scutum and four bare vittae ( longitudinal stripes), two before the transverse suture and two after. The postalar callus is yellow, pale pilose and shiny. The postpronotum is yellow to orange, pale pilose and white pollinose. The scutellum is yellow to orange, pale, black or mixed yellow and black pilose, with macrosetae. There is no subscutellar fringe. The pleurae are yellow, sparsely white pollinose. The anterior anepisternum, katepimeron and meron are bare. The posterior anepisternum and anepimeron are pale pilose. The katepisternum bare on dorsal half. The metasternum is yellow, sparsely white pollinose, without pile.

Wings

The unspotted wings are entirely densely microtrichose. The crossvein M1 is outwardly oblique. Vein R_{4+5} with the apical section shorter than crossvein r-m. The calypters are white. The halteres are yellow.

Legs

The legs are mostly pale to dark yellow.
The front femur is pale yellow with pale yellow pile. The mid and hind femur are yellow with black setae ventrally. All tibia are yellow with mixed pale and black pile. The basitarsi are yellow with mixed pale and black pile. The tarsomeres are yellow but the fourth and final tarsomeres are black.

Abdomen

The abdomen is oval, yellow to brown, pale pilose except tergites 2-4 that are black pilose medially. Genitalia in Skevington " New Syrphidae (Diptera) of North-eastern North America"
