= Brachyopa punctipennis =

Scientific classification
- Kingdom: Animalia
- Phylum: Arthropoda
- Clade: Pancrustacea
- Class: Insecta
- Order: Diptera
- Family: Syrphidae
- Subfamily: Eristalinae
- Tribe: Brachyopini
- Subtribe: Brachyopina
- Genus: Brachyopa
- Species: B. punctipennis

Binomial name
- Brachyopa punctipennis Curran, 1925

Species of fly

Brachyopa punctipennis, commonly known as the spot-winged sapeater, is a fly species in the syrphid family. First appearing in Oregon, this rarely collected species had been considered a form of Brachyopa notata until Curran named it a separate species in 1925.

== Description ==
The spot-winged sapeater has a length of 6 mm. The head is rusty red with a dusting of white, but is shiny red below the eyes, around the mouth, and in a middle stripe on the face. The antennae are orange with an elongated oval third segment (basoflageomere). The arista is bare basally, and short pubescent along the apex. The thorax is rusty yellow with a white powder, two narrowly separated medial stripes, and a broader stripe on each side of the medial stripes. The abdomen is rusty yellow, and more brownish at the posterior of each segment. The front and middle legs are yellow, while the hind legs are somewhat darker. The tarsi of all legs are dark.

== Distribution ==
The spot-winged sapeater is found in Canada and the United States.
