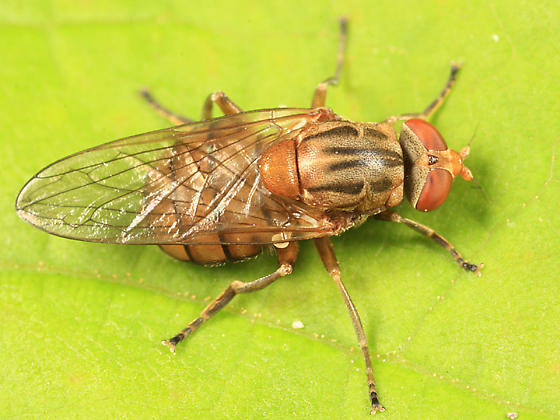
- Brachyopa flavescens female

Scientific classification
- Kingdom: Animalia
- Phylum: Arthropoda
- Clade: Pancrustacea
- Class: Insecta
- Order: Diptera
- Family: Syrphidae
- Subfamily: Eristalinae
- Tribe: Brachyopini
- Subtribe: Brachyopina
- Genus: Brachyopa
- Species: B. flavescens

Binomial name
- Brachyopa flavescens Shannon, 1915

= Brachyopa flavescens =

Species of fly

Brachyopa flavescens (Shannon, 1915), The Yellow Sapeater, is a fairly common species of syrphid fly. It has been observed in northeastern North America. Hoverflies get their names from the ability to remain nearly motionless while in flight. The adults are also known as flower flies for they are commonly found around and on flowers, from which they get both energy-giving nectar and protein-rich pollen. Larvae for this genus are of the rat-tailed type. B.flavescens larvae have not been described.

== Distribution ==
Canada, United States.

== Description ==
For terms see Morphology of Diptera.

Size

Length 4–6 mm (0.16–0.24 in)

Head

The vertex is yellowish gray, with pale, very short pile. The vertical triangle is narrow and acute, reaching forward to about the middle of the eyes. The frontal triangle is yellow and bare. The front in the female is yellow pollinose. The face moderately produced, light yellow, dusted with white and with fine light hairs and is concave below antennae. In the female the face, except below the antenna, lower part of the front, and a slender median frontal stripe are shining reddish yellow with whitish pollen except where shining face a little more concave than in B. media. The antennae are orange-yellow with an ovate flagellum that is longer than broad. The arista is basal darkened distally and with very fine microscopic pubescence along its entire length. The eyes are bare and holoptic in the male. The occiput is darkish above, with whitish pollen.

Thorax

The scutum is variable from dark ocher yellow to light yellow, dusted with brownish gray at the sides and behind broadly ferruginous and more shining. There are two narrow and approximated dark stripes medianly on anterior two-thirds with two broad, anteriorly and posteriorly abbreviated stripes outwardly and hairs that are rather short and densely yellow. The scutellum is convex, broadly rounded, much broader than long, shining, ocher yellow, rather evenly punctured, with light yellow hairs and a few bristle-like ones on the posterior margin. The pleurae are brown and black, thickly dusted with gray with somewhat longer hairs than those on scutum.

Abdomen

The abdomen is much broader than thorax, broadest at posterior margin of second segment. It is light yellow, more or less stained with dark by body contents with the second segment more or less translucent. The abdomen is reddish yellow. The narrow posterior margins of the segments are brownish, their lateral margins very narrowly or obscurely brownish on their posterior half. . The second and third abdominal segments do not have posterior pollinose bands or a median longitudinal stripe.

Wings

The wings are hyaline, faintly smoky, without trace of maculation, slightly darkened distally along anterior margin; The wings are longer than the abdomen. Anterior cross-vein is located before the middle of the discal cell. the first posterior cell ends in an acute angle near the apex of the wing. The vein R_{4+5} has the apical section shorter than the crossvein r-m. The stigma is yellow.

Legs: The coxae of all legs are yellow. The anterior and middle pairs of legs are yellow, with white pile. The hind legs are somewhat darker with the femora distally tinged with brown and with minute black spines along ventral surface. The hind tibiae are tinged with brown on the distal half. The first joint of the hind tarsi is grayish brown, paler distally and ventrally.
