= Brachyopa minima =

Scientific classification
- Kingdom: Animalia
- Phylum: Arthropoda
- Clade: Pancrustacea
- Class: Insecta
- Order: Diptera
- Family: Syrphidae
- Subfamily: Eristalinae
- Tribe: Brachyopini
- Subtribe: Brachyopina
- Genus: Brachyopa
- Species: B. minima

Binomial name
- Brachyopa minima Vujic & Pérez-Bañón, 2016

Species of fly

Brachyopa minima is a European species of hoverfly.

== Distribution ==
B. minima is found in Greece.
