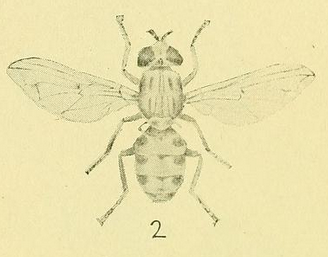
- Brachyopa cynops

Scientific classification
- Kingdom: Animalia
- Phylum: Arthropoda
- Clade: Pancrustacea
- Class: Insecta
- Order: Diptera
- Family: Syrphidae
- Subfamily: Eristalinae
- Tribe: Brachyopini
- Subtribe: Brachyopina
- Genus: Brachyopa
- Species: B. cynops

Binomial name
- Brachyopa cynops Snow, 1892

= Brachyopa cynops =

Species of fly

Brachyopa cynops (Snow, 1884), the Matt-tailed Sapeater, is a rare species of syrphid fly. It has been collected in Colorado. Hoverflies get their names from the ability to remain nearly motionless while in flight. The adults are also known as flower flies for they are commonly found around and on flowers, from which they get both energy-giving nectar and protein-rich pollen. Larvae for this genus are of the rat-tailed type. B.cynops larvae have not been described.

== Description ==
Size

5 mm (0.2 in)

Head
The frons has a shining light yellow-brown ground color shows just above the antennae and with pale pollinose areas and dark to the ocelli. The Face has a shining light yellow -brown ground color in a stripe on the cheeks, extending from the eye to the mouth opening The antennae is light brown with short scape, and pedicle and a flagellum that is twice as long as wide. The eyes are bare. The rear margin is nearly straight from the middle to the rounded bottom. The occiput is a large brown area behind eye and black at the apex.
Thorax
Mesonotum and pale yellow-brown covered with grayish pollen The anterior with two linear blackish stripes The scutellum is light brown, with yellowish pollen The pleurae are yellow-brown and covered with a grayish pollen.
Wings
The wings are mostly hyaline, but distinctly clouded at the anterior cross-veins, plus on the veins at the anterior outer corner of the discal cell and on the fourth vein (M). The posterior cross-vein is about as long as the ultimate section of the fourth vein (M).
Legs
All femurs are dark brown, as is the hind tibia. Tarsi are yellow-brown
Abdomen
The abdomen is slightly longer than broad, mostly dark brown to black with yellowish gray pollen. The second segment has a circular brown spot on the anterior corners. Segments three and four are marked with similar elliptical spots, and, with a triangular spot on the central front edge. On segment five are two small spots.
