= Brachyopa gigas =

Scientific classification
- Kingdom: Animalia
- Phylum: Arthropoda
- Clade: Pancrustacea
- Class: Insecta
- Order: Diptera
- Family: Syrphidae
- Subfamily: Eristalinae
- Tribe: Brachyopini
- Subtribe: Brachyopina
- Genus: Brachyopa
- Species: B. gigas

Binomial name
- Brachyopa gigas Lovett, 1919

Species of fly

Brachyopa gigas (Lovett, 1882), the Giant Sapeater, is a rare, species of syrphid fly. It has been observed in Washington state and California. Hoverflies get their names from the ability to remain nearly motionless while in flight The adults are known as flower flies for they are commonly found around and on flowers from which they get both energy-giving nectar and protein-rich pollen. Larvae for this genus are of the rat-tailed type. B.gigas larvae have not been described.

== Distribution ==
Western coasts of Canada and the United States.
