= Brachyopa paradoxa =

Scientific classification
- Kingdom: Animalia
- Phylum: Arthropoda
- Clade: Pancrustacea
- Class: Insecta
- Order: Diptera
- Family: Syrphidae
- Subfamily: Eristalinae
- Tribe: Brachyopini
- Subtribe: Brachyopina
- Genus: Brachyopa
- Species: B. paradoxa

Binomial name
- Brachyopa paradoxa Krivosheina, 2004

Species of fly

Brachyopa paradoxa is an Asian species of hoverfly.

== Distribution ==
Tajikistan.
