= Brachyopa atlantea =

Scientific classification
- Kingdom: Animalia
- Phylum: Arthropoda
- Clade: Pancrustacea
- Class: Insecta
- Order: Diptera
- Family: Syrphidae
- Subfamily: Eristalinae
- Tribe: Brachyopini
- Subtribe: Brachyopina
- Genus: Brachyopa
- Species: B. atlantea

Binomial name
- Brachyopa atlantea Kassebeer, 2000

Species of fly

Brachyopa atlantea is a European species of hoverflies.

== Distribution ==
Spain, North Africa (Morocco).
