= Brachyopa testacea =

Scientific classification
- Kingdom: Animalia
- Phylum: Arthropoda
- Clade: Pancrustacea
- Class: Insecta
- Order: Diptera
- Family: Syrphidae
- Subfamily: Eristalinae
- Tribe: Brachyopini
- Subtribe: Brachyopina
- Genus: Brachyopa
- Species: B. testacea

Binomial name
- Brachyopa testacea (Fallén, 1816)

Synonyms
- Rhingia testacea Fallén, 1817

Species of fly

Brachyopa testacea is a European species of hoverfly.

== Distribution ==
Sweden.
