= Brachyopa tianzhuensis =

Scientific classification
- Kingdom: Animalia
- Phylum: Arthropoda
- Clade: Pancrustacea
- Class: Insecta
- Order: Diptera
- Family: Syrphidae
- Subfamily: Eristalinae
- Tribe: Brachyopini
- Subtribe: Brachyopina
- Genus: Brachyopa
- Species: B. tianzhuensis

Binomial name
- Brachyopa tianzhuensis Li & Li, 1990

Species of fly

Brachyopa tianzhuensis is an Asian species of hoverfly.

== Distribution ==
China.
