= Middle Elbe Biosphere Reserve =

The Middle Elbe Biosphere Reserve is a Biosphere Reserve in the German Federal state Saxony-Anhalt.

The Middle Elbe reserve is a 430 square kilometre protected reserve, and is the largest protected region in Saxony-Anhalt . It extends along the Elbe river, between Wittenberg in the east, via Dessau-Roßlau, to Gommern in the northwest. This beautiful region of fluvial topography is one of the main attractions for tourism in Saxony-Anhalt, particularly for bicycle tourism.

== History ==
The history of the Reserve originates with the Anhalt Environmental Protection Law of 1923. Over the next six years, this initial protected reserve was expanded. The "Saalberge" and "Möster Birken" regions were added in 1926. In 1927, conservation areas for the Elbe beaver and the "Wassernuß" plant (Trapa natans) were added. In 1929, areas between Aken and Tochheim were put under protection. These areas were the predecessors of the Steckby-Lödderitzer Forst conservation area.

The Steckby-Lödderitzer Forst was recognized as a Biosphere Reserve by the UNESCO in 1979, and in 1988 it was extended by wide areas around Dessau and Wörlitz. With the addition of further areas of water meadows, it became the Biosphere Reserve Middle Elbe in 1990.

== Features ==
The Reserve contains the largest interconnected water meadow area of Middle Europe. It involves the Elbe river and Mulde and includes the Elbe floodplains as a unique biotope which serves as shelter for many endangered species. In 2005 Dr. Frank Dziock discovered a new insect species Brachyopa silviae. Of the genus Brachyopa, only 13 species are known in Europe.

The reserve also includes Wörlitz Park, the oldest landscape park on the European Continent .

Since March 20, 2006 the official name is: Biosphere Reserve Middle Elbe.

- area: 430 km²
- biodiversity
  - over 1.000 botanical species
  - 250 avian species
  - 130 bees species
  - 50 dragonfly species
