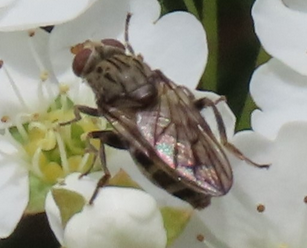

Scientific classification
- Kingdom: Animalia
- Phylum: Arthropoda
- Clade: Pancrustacea
- Class: Insecta
- Order: Diptera
- Family: Syrphidae
- Subfamily: Eristalinae
- Tribe: Brachyopini
- Subtribe: Brachyopina
- Genus: Brachyopa
- Species: B. diversa

Binomial name
- Brachyopa diversa Johnson, 1917

= Brachyopa diversa =

Species of fly

Brachyopa diversa , the pale-striped sapeater, is a rare species of syrphid fly. It has been observed in the northeastern part of North America. Hoverflies get their names from the ability to remain nearly motionless while in flight. The adults are also known as flower flies for they are commonly found around and on flowers, from which they get both energy-giving nectar and protein-rich pollen. Larvae for this genus are of the rat-tailed type. B.diversa larvae have not been described.

== Distribution ==
Canada, United States. New York State

== Description ==
For terms see Morphology of Diptera.

Length: 6–8 mm (0.24–0.31 in)

=== Head ===
The vertical triangle is long and narrow, black with short brown pile. The front in the female is golden yellow pollinose, leaving the ocelli and a distinct black streak from the ocelli to a large black squarish area above the antennae. The face is brownish red, covered with whitish pollen which leaves the oral margin in front, a spot above the antennae and a stripe on the cheeks, shining brownish. In profile the face is concave above, a little convex below, prominent below, and moderately produced downwards. The face below, on the sides, shining yellowish, although the lower part of the face is slightly pubescent. The flagellum is brownish red. The scape and pedicle are a little darker than the flagellum. The arista is bare, pubescent or short plumose The eyes are bare, practically touching in the male. arista: The posterior orbits are brownish red, pollinose, with whitish pile.

=== Thorax ===
The scutum is grayish pollinose with black pile, leaving shining brownish stripes as follows: a median pair on the anterior two-thirds, an interrupted stripe on each side of these, and the sides of the dorsum, a slender median one in front of the scutellum, and slightly oblique ones running from the corners of the scutellum to just outside the ends of the antero-median stripes. There is a spot on the inner ends of the transverse suture. .There are areas of yellowish pile between the humeri and across the posterior margin. The scutellum is reddish, yellowish pilose, with a few longer, not quite bristly hairs on the margin. The pleura are brownish red with yellowish pile, a lighter pollen and a cluster of black hairs on the upper part of the mesopleura.

=== Abdomen ===
The abdomen is shining black with grayish yellow pollinose posterior bands.
The second abdominal segment is chiefly pollinose. The first and second abdominal segments are grayish yellow pollinose. The second segment has a median longitudinal line, not reaching the posterior margin, and an oval spot that reaches the sides. On the anterior portion of the segment is shining black. The third and fourth segments are shining black, with the hind margins grayish yellow pollinose. The pollen on the segment extends forward in the middle to the anterior third, but there is a roundish notch centrally in front, corresponding to the median stripe on the second segment. The fifth abdominal segment is yellow pollinose, except an anterior broadly interrupted cross-band; The hypopygium is yellowish red; Second and third abdominal segments with posterior pollinose bands.

=== Wings ===
The wings longer than the abdomen with anterior cross-vein before the middle of the discal cell. The wings are slightly yellowish anteriorly. The region of the anterior cross vein and a streak between the spurious vein and the fourth vein (M) beyond the cross-vein are all brownish. The wings are more yellowish basally. The first posterior cell ends in an acute angle near the apex of the wing. . The M1 vein is outwardly oblique. The apical section of vein R_{4+5} is shorter than crossvein r-m.

=== Legs ===
The legs are mostly black with areas of yellow.
The tips of the femora are yellow. The basal third and distal tips of tibiae are yellow. The tarsi are yellow except for the black tips.
