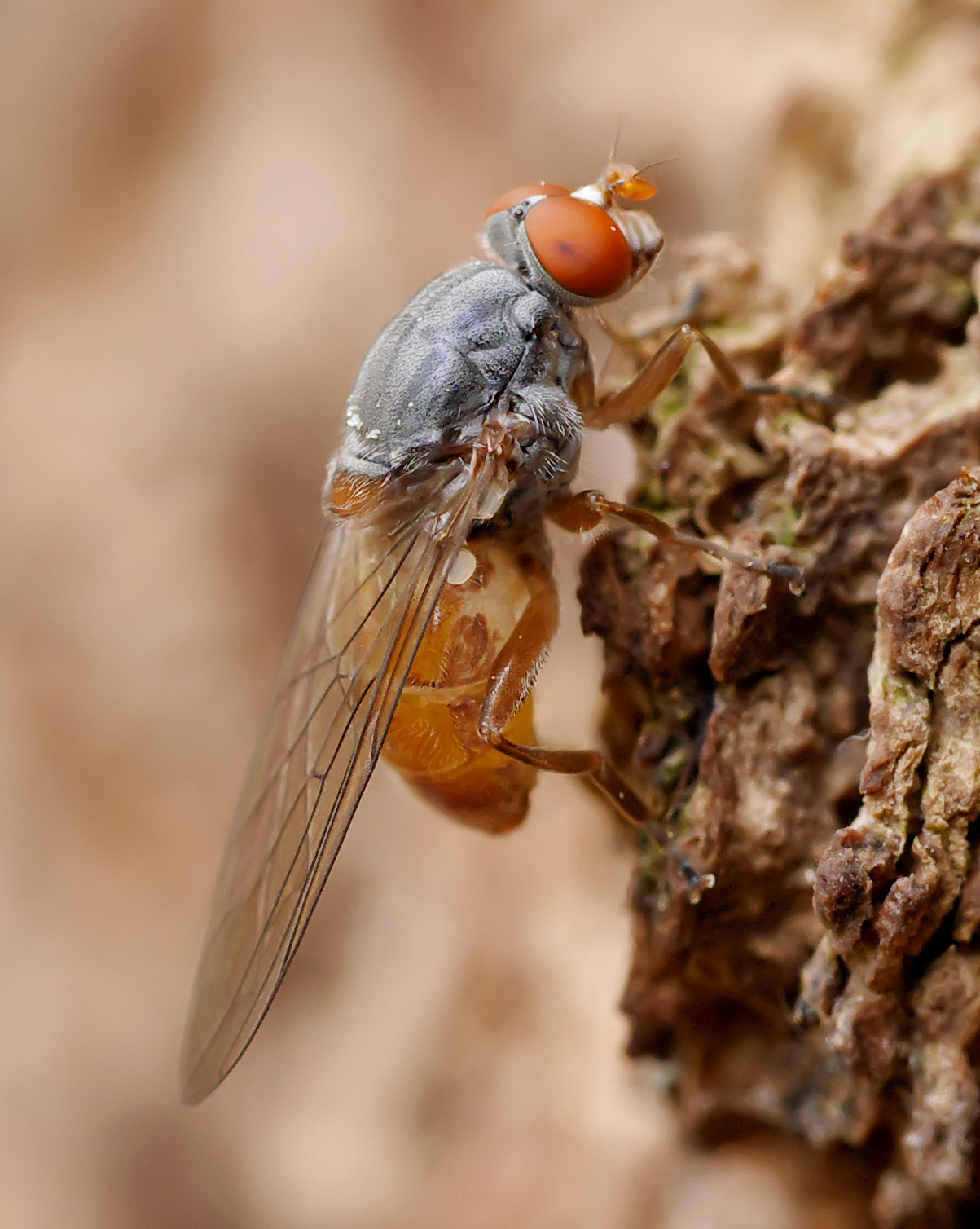

Scientific classification
- Kingdom: Animalia
- Phylum: Arthropoda
- Clade: Pancrustacea
- Class: Insecta
- Order: Diptera
- Family: Syrphidae
- Subfamily: Eristalinae
- Tribe: Brachyopini
- Subtribe: Brachyopina
- Genus: Brachyopa
- Species: B. insensilis

Binomial name
- Brachyopa insensilis Collin, 1939

= Brachyopa insensilis =

Species of fly

Brachyopa insensilis is a Palearctic species of hoverflies.

== Description ==
External images For terms see Morphology of Diptera
The wing length is 6·5-7·25 mm. Apical antennomere small and without a sensory pit. Arista almost bare. Face less produced than in Brachyopa bicolor. Scutellum with microtrichia only on anterior margin. The larva is illustrated by Rotheray (1993).

== Distribution ==
Brachyopa insensilis is a Palearctic species with a wide distribution in Europe and east to Tajikistan, Siberia, Russian Far East and Kamchatka.

The habitat is Abies, Quercus and Fagus forest with senile trees, but also occurs on old trees in suburban parks.

== Behaviour ==
Brachyopa insensilis is arboreal descending to visit sap runs and flowers (white umbellifers, Photinia, Prunus padus, Sorbus aria. The flight period is from the beginning of May to the end of June. Brachyopa insensilis has a characteristic, rapid, zigzag flight and rarely descends lower than 3 metres from the ground. It may occur in small swarms around sap runs. Larvae feed in sap runs and rot holes.
