= Cacoceria willistoni =

Scientific classification
- Kingdom: Animalia
- Phylum: Arthropoda
- Class: Insecta
- Order: Diptera
- Family: Syrphidae
- Subfamily: Eristalinae
- Tribe: Brachyopini
- Subtribe: Brachyopina
- Genus: Cacoceria
- Species: C. willistoni

Binomial name
- Cacoceria willistoni Hull, 1950

Species of fly

Cacoceria willistoni is a species of Hoverfly in the family Syrphidae.

== Distribution ==
Peru, Argentina.
