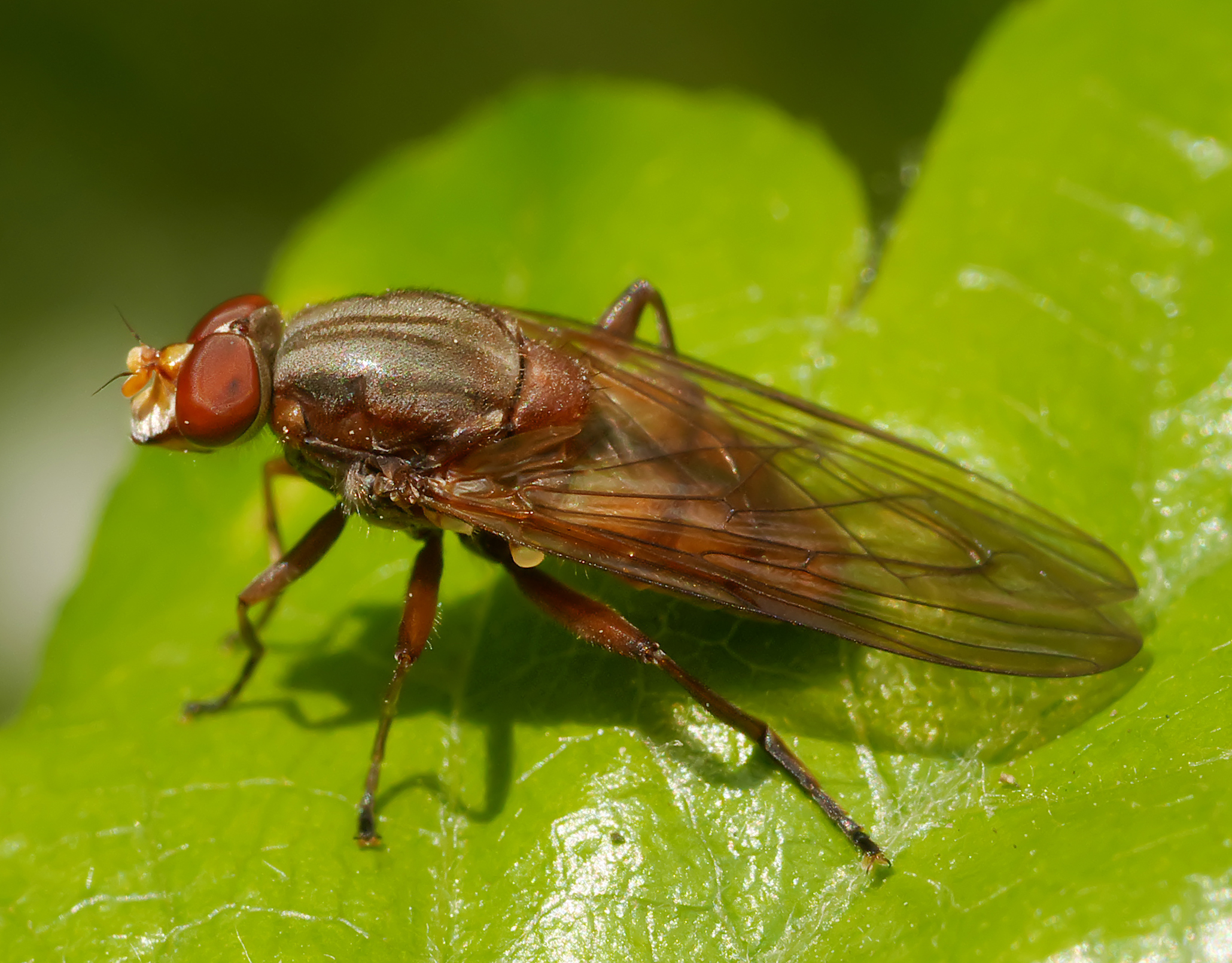

Scientific classification
- Kingdom: Animalia
- Phylum: Arthropoda
- Clade: Pancrustacea
- Class: Insecta
- Order: Diptera
- Family: Syrphidae
- Subfamily: Eristalinae
- Tribe: Brachyopini
- Subtribe: Brachyopina
- Genus: Brachyopa
- Species: B. dorsata

Binomial name
- Brachyopa dorsata Zetterstedt, 1837

Synonyms
- Brachyopa sibirica Violovich, 1982

= Brachyopa dorsata =

Species of fly

Brachyopa dorsata is a species of hoverfly found in Europe.

== Distribution ==
Fennoscandia south to the Pyrenees; Belgium and the Netherlands eastwards through much of central and northern Europe into European parts of Russia and on across Siberia to the Pacific..
