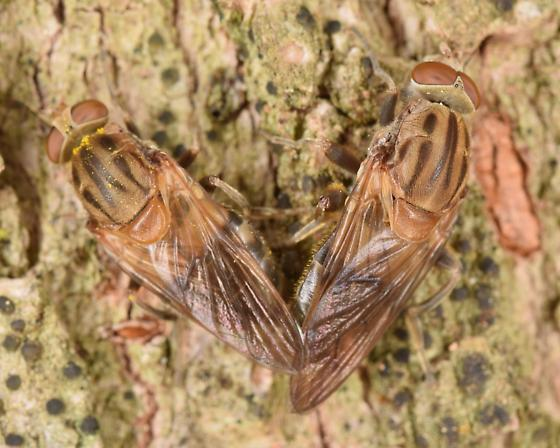
- Brachyopa vacua pair

Scientific classification
- Kingdom: Animalia
- Phylum: Arthropoda
- Clade: Pancrustacea
- Class: Insecta
- Order: Diptera
- Family: Syrphidae
- Subfamily: Eristalinae
- Tribe: Brachyopini
- Subtribe: Brachyopina
- Genus: Brachyopa
- Species: B. vacua

Binomial name
- Brachyopa vacua Osten Sacken, 1875

Synonyms
- Brachyopa racua Osten Sacken, 1875

= Brachyopa vacua =

Species of fly

Brachyopa vacua (Osten Sacken, 1875), the Yellow-spotted Sapeater, is a rare, species of syrphid fly. It has been observed in Canada, Alaska and the northern United States. Hoverflies get their names from the ability to remain nearly motionless while in flight. The adults are also known as flower flies for they are commonly found around and on flowers from which they get both energy-giving nectar and protein-rich pollen. Larvae for this genus are of the rat-tailed type. B.vacua larvae were collected from the juice of decaying fungi under dead bark.

== Description ==
7 to 10 mm. long Head a dirty yellow with a brown stripe on the cheek. Thorax with yellow hair and a double row of dark median lines. Scutellum with yellow hairs. Large yellow spots on the second abdominal segment. Wings, longer than last abdominal segment. Legs brown with light yellow at joints.

== Larvae and puparium ==
Larva. Length, 8 mm.x 3 mm., appears opaque yellow-ochre, brown, to black. Pointed anteriorly, widening in middle. Entirely wrinkled and covered with black spines ventrally. Puparium Length7 mm. cylindrical, wedge shaped in profile. The pupal spiracles are reddish-brown, conical, and curved outward, bearing numerous small tubercles around the sides and with one at the apex. The larvae were taken from the juice of decaying fungi under dead bark of a tulip tree.

== Distribution ==
United States

Utah, Minnesotans, Iowa, Kansans, Missoula, Illinois, Michigan, Pennsylvania, Tennessean, Georgia, Virginia, Maryland, Massachusetts, Connecticut

Canada,

Ontario, Nunavut, Québec
