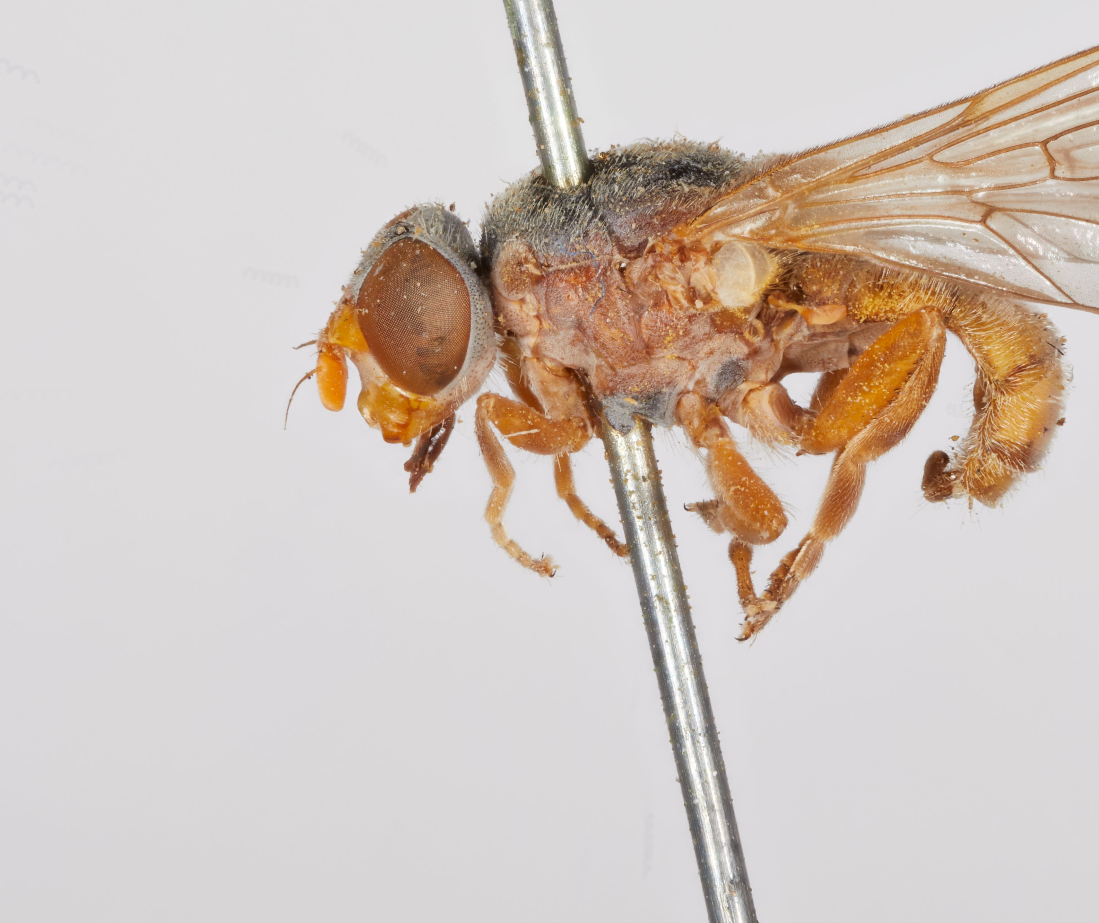

Scientific classification
- Kingdom: Animalia
- Phylum: Arthropoda
- Clade: Pancrustacea
- Class: Insecta
- Order: Diptera
- Family: Syrphidae
- Subfamily: Eristalinae
- Tribe: Brachyopini
- Subtribe: Brachyopina
- Genus: Brachyopa
- Species: B. notata

Binomial name
- Brachyopa notata Williston, 1882

= Brachyopa media =

Species of fly

Brachyopa media ( Williston, 1882), is a rare species of syrphid fly. It has been observed in the Northeastern United States. Hoverflies get their names from the ability to remain nearly motionless while in flight. The adults are also known as flower flies for they are commonly found around and on flowers from which they get both energy-giving nectar and protein-rich pollen. Larvae for this genus are of the rat-tailed type. B.media larvae have not been described.

== Distribution ==
Canada, United States.
