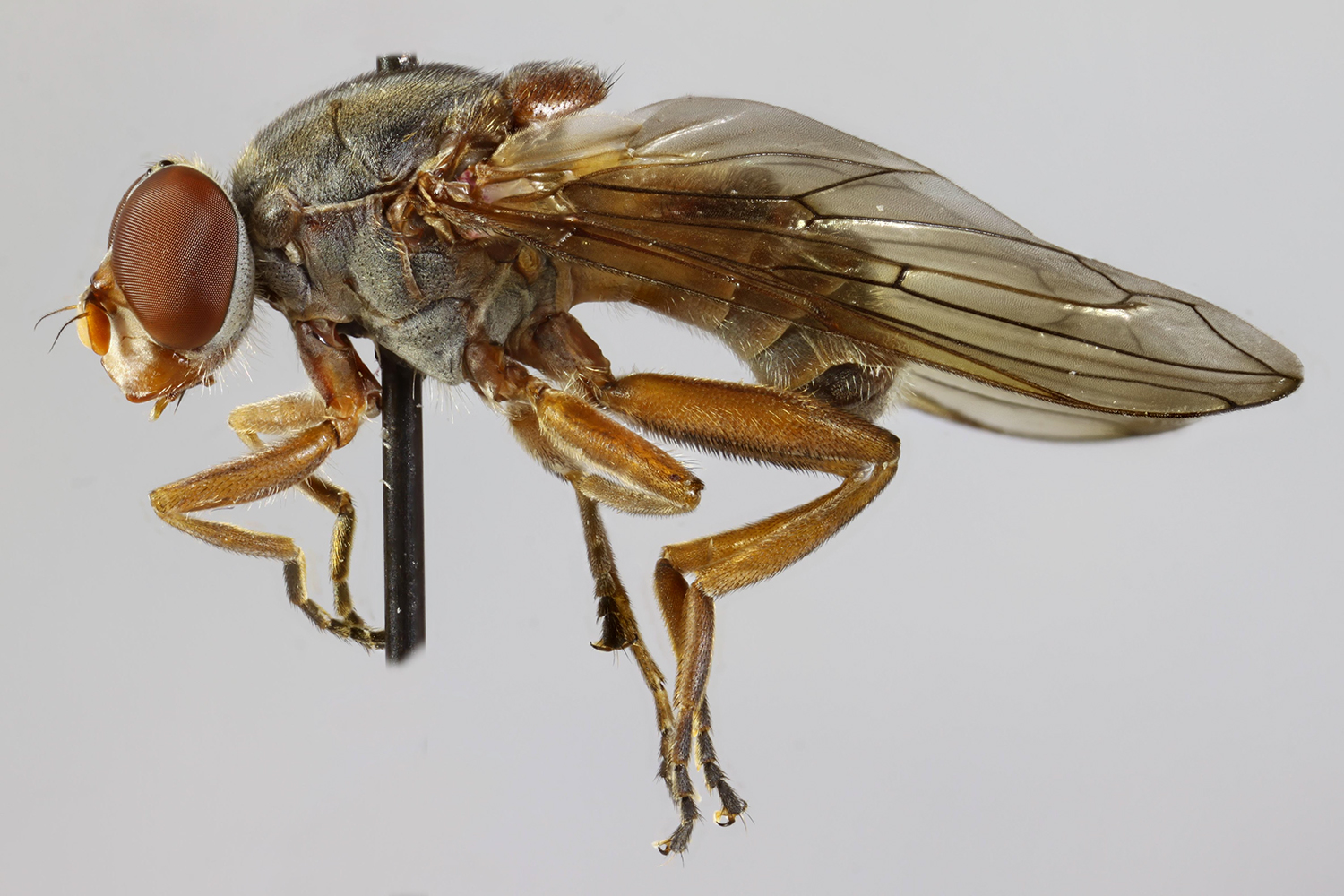
- Brachyopa scutellaris Wales

Scientific classification
- Kingdom: Animalia
- Phylum: Arthropoda
- Clade: Pancrustacea
- Class: Insecta
- Order: Diptera
- Family: Syrphidae
- Subfamily: Eristalinae
- Tribe: Brachyopini
- Subtribe: Brachyopina
- Genus: Brachyopa
- Species: B. scutellaris

Binomial name
- Brachyopa scutellaris Robineau-Desvoidy, 1843

= Brachyopa scutellaris =

Species of fly

Brachyopa scutellaris is a European species of hoverfly.

== Description ==
External images For terms see Morphology of Diptera
The wing length is 6·5-7·75 mm. Apical antennomere with a large kidney-shaped sensory pit Tergite 2 posterolaterally black pilose. The larva is illustrated by Rotheray (1993).

== Distribution ==
Brachyopa scutellaris is a west Palearctic species with a distribution centred in Europe (Denmark to the Pyrenees, Ireland east through Central Europe to Switzerland).

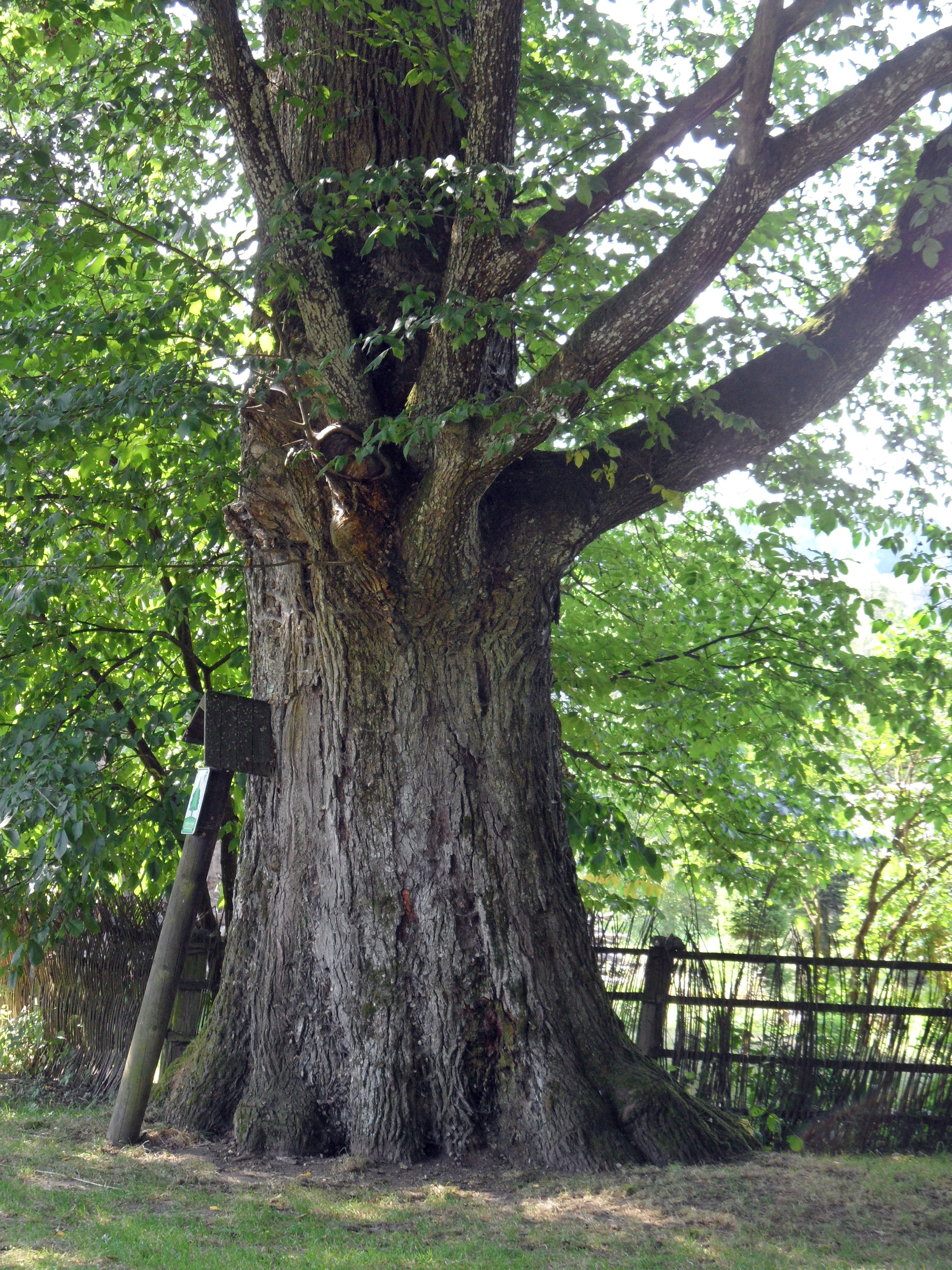
Habitat. Czech Republic

== Habitat and biology ==
The habitat is deciduous forest (Acer, Alnus, Ulmus, Fraxinus). The flight period is mid April to end June. Brachyopa scutellaris flies, pendulously, in sunlit patches beside living trees with sap runs (where the larvae develop) and around rot-holes. Flowers visited include white umbellifers, Cardamine, Crataegus, Malus, Cornus, Photinia, Rubus fruticosus, Sorbus and Viburnum.
