= Brachyopa tabarkensis =

Scientific classification
- Kingdom: Animalia
- Phylum: Arthropoda
- Clade: Pancrustacea
- Class: Insecta
- Order: Diptera
- Family: Syrphidae
- Subfamily: Eristalinae
- Tribe: Brachyopini
- Subtribe: Brachyopina
- Genus: Brachyopa
- Species: B. tabarkensis

Binomial name
- Brachyopa tabarkensis Kassebeer, 2002

Species of fly

Brachyopa tabarkensis is a European species of hoverflies.

== Distribution ==
Tunisia.
