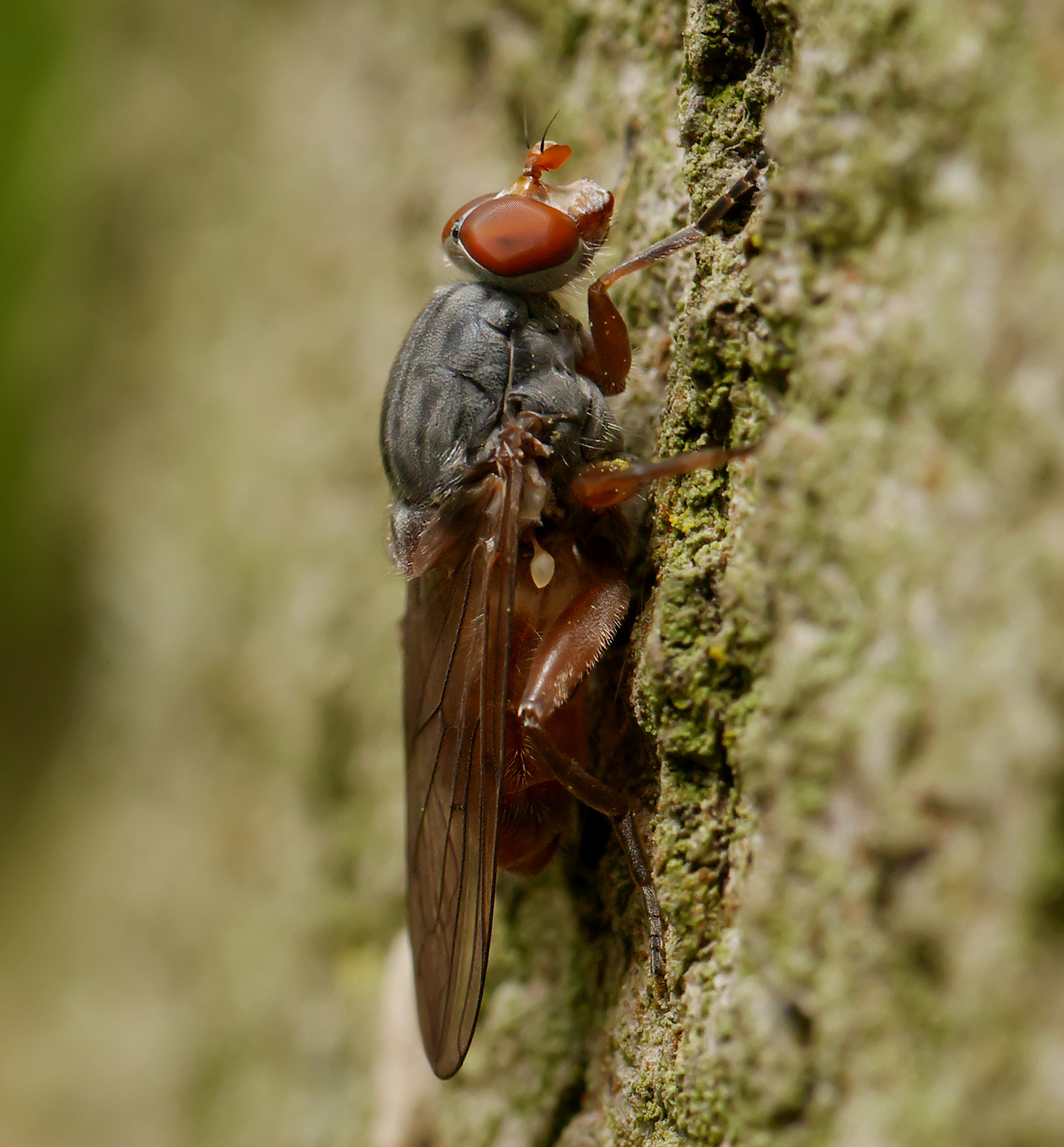

Scientific classification
- Kingdom: Animalia
- Phylum: Arthropoda
- Clade: Pancrustacea
- Class: Insecta
- Order: Diptera
- Family: Syrphidae
- Subfamily: Eristalinae
- Tribe: Brachyopini
- Subtribe: Brachyopina
- Genus: Brachyopa
- Species: B. bicolor

Binomial name
- Brachyopa bicolor (Fallén, 1817)

Synonyms
- Rhingia bicolor Fallén, 1817

= Brachyopa bicolor =

Species of fly

Brachyopa bicolor (Fallén, 1817) is an uncommon species of syrphid fly. It has been observed in Central Europe from Germany to Greece. Hoverflies get their names from the ability to remain nearly motionless while in flight. The adults are also known as flower flies for they are commonly found around and on flowers, from which they get both energy-giving nectar and protein-rich pollen. Larvae for this genus are of the rat-tailed type. B.bicolor larvae have been described from sap runs in Aesculus, Fagus and Quercus.

== Description ==
For terms see Morphology of Diptera
External images The wing length is 6·5-9·25 mm. The arista is almost bare, none of the minute hairs nearly as long as arista is thick at base. Antennae with segment 3 large, with a rather small round sensory pit on inner side below near base, removed from lower margin of the segment by about its own depth. Thorax with hairs on notopleural area all dark and the scutellum with the basal half obscured by dust, otherwise shining tawny yellow, with a more or less distinct transverse depression; face more produced than in Brachyopa insensilis. Male frons extensively shining yellowish, dusted only on the upper angle and very narrowly along eye-margins.

== Distribution ==
Brachyopa bicolor is a Palearctic species with a limited distribution in Europe
