= Brachyopa cinerea =

Scientific classification
- Kingdom: Animalia
- Phylum: Arthropoda
- Clade: Pancrustacea
- Class: Insecta
- Order: Diptera
- Family: Syrphidae
- Subfamily: Eristalinae
- Tribe: Brachyopini
- Subtribe: Brachyopina
- Genus: Brachyopa
- Species: B. cinerea

Binomial name
- Brachyopa cinerea Wahlberg, 1844

Species of fly

Brachyopa cinerea is a European species of hoverfly.

== Distribution ==
northern and southern Norway, northern Sweden, Finland, through most of Siberia to the Russian Far East; Japan.
