= Brachyopa cummingi =

Scientific classification
- Kingdom: Animalia
- Phylum: Arthropoda
- Clade: Pancrustacea
- Class: Insecta
- Order: Diptera
- Family: Syrphidae
- Subfamily: Eristalinae
- Tribe: Brachyopini
- Subtribe: Brachyopina
- Genus: Brachyopa
- Species: B. cummingi

Binomial name
- Brachyopa cummingi Moran & Skevington, 2019

Species of fly

Brachyopa cummingi is a species of hoverfly in the family Syrphidae.

== Distribution ==
Canada.
