= Brachyopa rufiabdominalis =

Scientific classification
- Kingdom: Animalia
- Phylum: Arthropoda
- Clade: Pancrustacea
- Class: Insecta
- Order: Diptera
- Family: Syrphidae
- Subfamily: Eristalinae
- Tribe: Brachyopini
- Subtribe: Brachyopina
- Genus: Brachyopa
- Species: B. rufiabdominalis

Binomial name
- Brachyopa rufiabdominalis Jones, 1917

Species of fly

Brachyopa rufiabdominalis (Jones, 1917), the Red-tailed Sapeater, is a rare species of syrphid fly. It has been observed in Colorado. Hoverflies get their names from the ability to remain nearly motionless while in flight. The adults are also known as flower flies, for they are commonly found around and on flowers from which they get both energy-giving nectar and protein-rich pollen. Larvae for this genus are of the rat-tailed type. B.rufiabdominalis larvae have not been described.

== Distribution ==
Canada, United States.
