= Chromocheilosia bicolor =

Scientific classification
- Kingdom: Animalia
- Phylum: Arthropoda
- Class: Insecta
- Order: Diptera
- Family: Syrphidae
- Subfamily: Eristalinae
- Tribe: Brachyopini
- Subtribe: Brachyopina
- Genus: Chromocheilosia
- Species: C. bicolor

Binomial name
- Chromocheilosia bicolor Shannon & Aubertin, 1933

Synonyms
- Chilosia bicolor Shannon & Aubertin, 1933

Species of fly

Chromocheilosia bicolor is a species of hoverfly in the family Syrphidae.

== Distribution ==
Chile.
