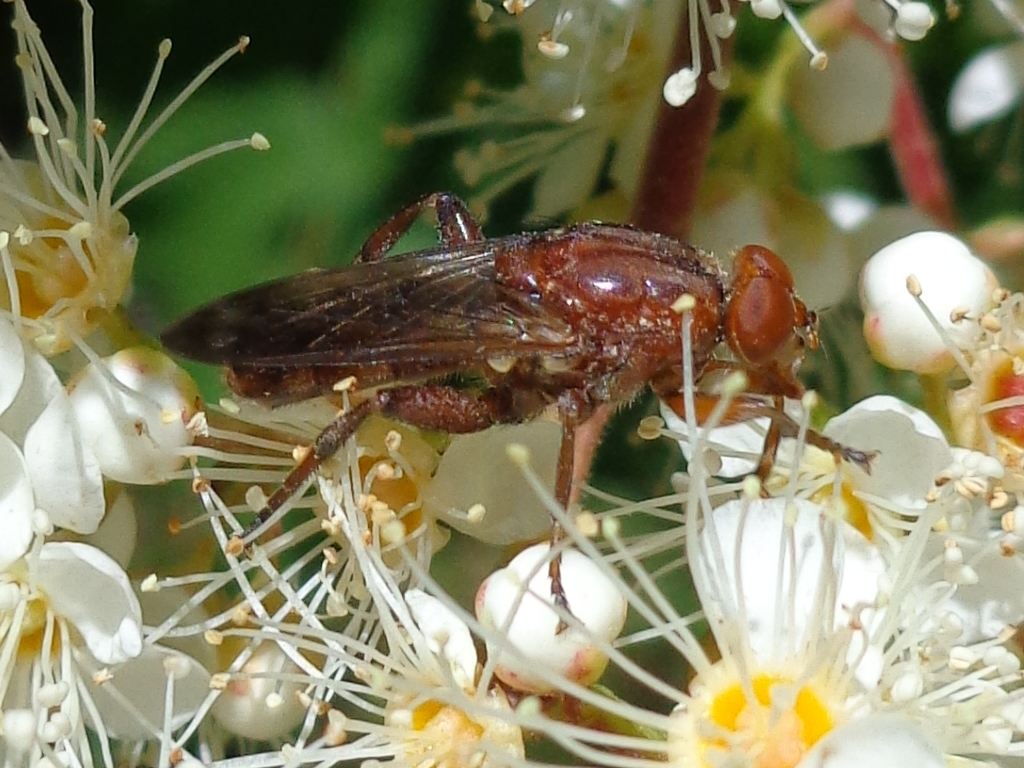

Scientific classification
- Kingdom: Animalia
- Phylum: Arthropoda
- Clade: Pancrustacea
- Class: Insecta
- Order: Diptera
- Family: Syrphidae
- Subfamily: Eristalinae
- Tribe: Brachyopini
- Subtribe: Brachyopina
- Genus: Brachyopa
- Species: B. panzeri

Binomial name
- Brachyopa panzeri Goffe, 1945

Synonyms
- Musca conica Panzer, 1798

= Brachyopa panzeri =

Species of fly

Brachyopa panzeri is a European species of hoverflies.

== Distribution ==
Europe.
