= Brachyopa cruriscutum =

Scientific classification
- Kingdom: Animalia
- Phylum: Arthropoda
- Clade: Pancrustacea
- Class: Insecta
- Order: Diptera
- Family: Syrphidae
- Subfamily: Eristalinae
- Tribe: Brachyopini
- Subtribe: Brachyopina
- Genus: Brachyopa
- Species: B. cruriscutum

Binomial name
- Brachyopa cruriscutum Steenis & Steenis, 2014

Species of fly

Brachyopa cruriscutum is an Asian species of hoverfly.

== Distribution ==
Turkey.
