= Cacoceria cressoni =

Scientific classification
- Kingdom: Animalia
- Phylum: Arthropoda
- Class: Insecta
- Order: Diptera
- Family: Syrphidae
- Subfamily: Eristalinae
- Tribe: Brachyopini
- Subtribe: Brachyopina
- Genus: Cacoceria
- Species: C. cressoni

Binomial name
- Cacoceria cressoni (Hull, 1930)

Synonyms
- Cacomyia cressoni Hull, 1930

Species of fly

Cacoceria cressoni is a species of hoverfly in the family Syrphidae.

== Distribution ==
Mexico.
