= Chromocheilosia pubescens =

Scientific classification
- Kingdom: Animalia
- Phylum: Arthropoda
- Class: Insecta
- Order: Diptera
- Family: Syrphidae
- Subfamily: Eristalinae
- Tribe: Brachyopini
- Subtribe: Brachyopina
- Genus: Chromocheilosia
- Species: C. pubescens

Binomial name
- Chromocheilosia pubescens (Shannon & Aubertin, 1933)

Synonyms
- Chilosia pubescens Shannon & Aubertin, 1933

Species of fly

Chromocheilosia pubescens is a species of hoverfly in the family Syrphidae.

== Distribution ==
Chile, Argentina.
