= Brachyopa silviae =

Scientific classification
- Kingdom: Animalia
- Phylum: Arthropoda
- Clade: Pancrustacea
- Class: Insecta
- Order: Diptera
- Family: Syrphidae
- Subfamily: Eristalinae
- Tribe: Brachyopini
- Subtribe: Brachyopina
- Genus: Brachyopa
- Species: B. silviae

Binomial name
- Brachyopa silviae Doczkal & Dziock, 2004

Species of fly

Brachyopa silviae is a European species of hoverflies.

== Distribution ==
Germany.
