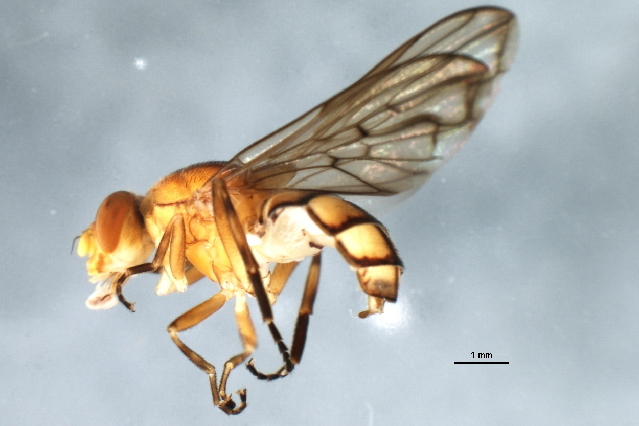

Scientific classification
- Kingdom: Animalia
- Phylum: Arthropoda
- Clade: Pancrustacea
- Class: Insecta
- Order: Diptera
- Family: Syrphidae
- Subfamily: Eristalinae
- Tribe: Brachyopini
- Subtribe: Brachyopina
- Genus: Brachyopa
- Species: B. notata

Binomial name
- Brachyopa notata Osten Sacken, 1875

= Brachyopa notata =

Species of fly

Brachyopa notata (Osten Sacken, 1875), the Black-banded Sapeater, is a rare species of syrphid fly. It has been observed in Northeastern North America. Hoverflies get their names from the ability to remain nearly motionless while in flight. The adults are also known as flower flies for they are commonly found around and on flowers from which they get both energy-giving nectar and protein rich pollen. Larvae for this genus are of the rat-tailed type. B.notata larvae have not been described.

== Distribution ==
Canada, United States.
