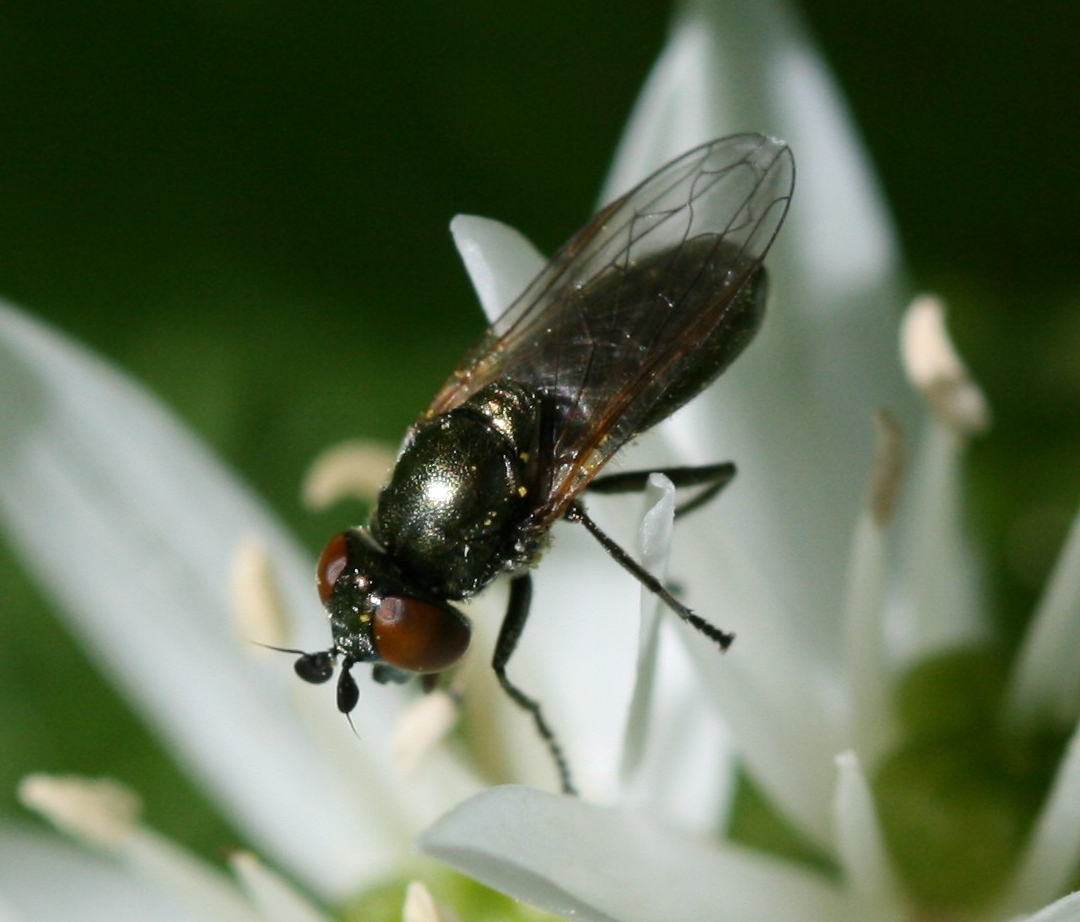
- Lejogaster metallina

Scientific classification
- Kingdom: Animalia
- Phylum: Arthropoda
- Class: Insecta
- Order: Diptera
- Family: Syrphidae
- Genus: Lejogaster
- Species: L. metallina

Binomial name
- Lejogaster metallina (Fabricius, 1777)

= Lejogaster metallina =

Species of fly

Lejogaster metallina is a Palearctic species of hoverfly.

== Description ==
External images For terms see Morphology of Diptera
Shiny metallic green. Antennae completely black. Antennomere 3 round. Legs black. The male genitalia are figured by Maibach, A. & Goeldlin de Tiefenau (1994) . The larva is illustrated by Hartley (1961)

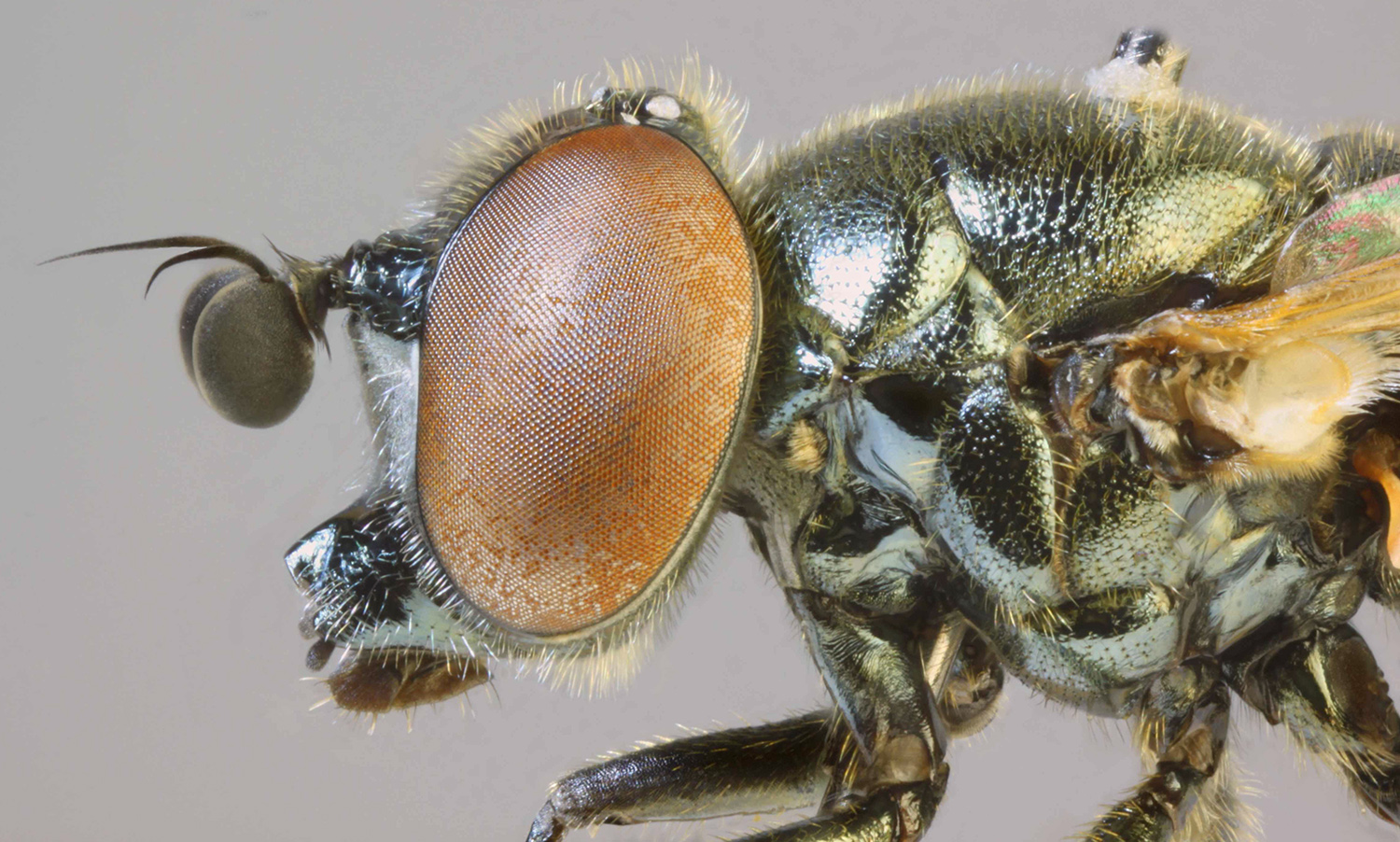

Wing length 4·75-6·5 mm. See references for determination.

== Distribution ==
Palearctic Fennoscandia and the Faroes South to Iberia and the Mediterranean basin. Ireland eastwards through Europe to the Russian Far East and Siberia to the Pacific.

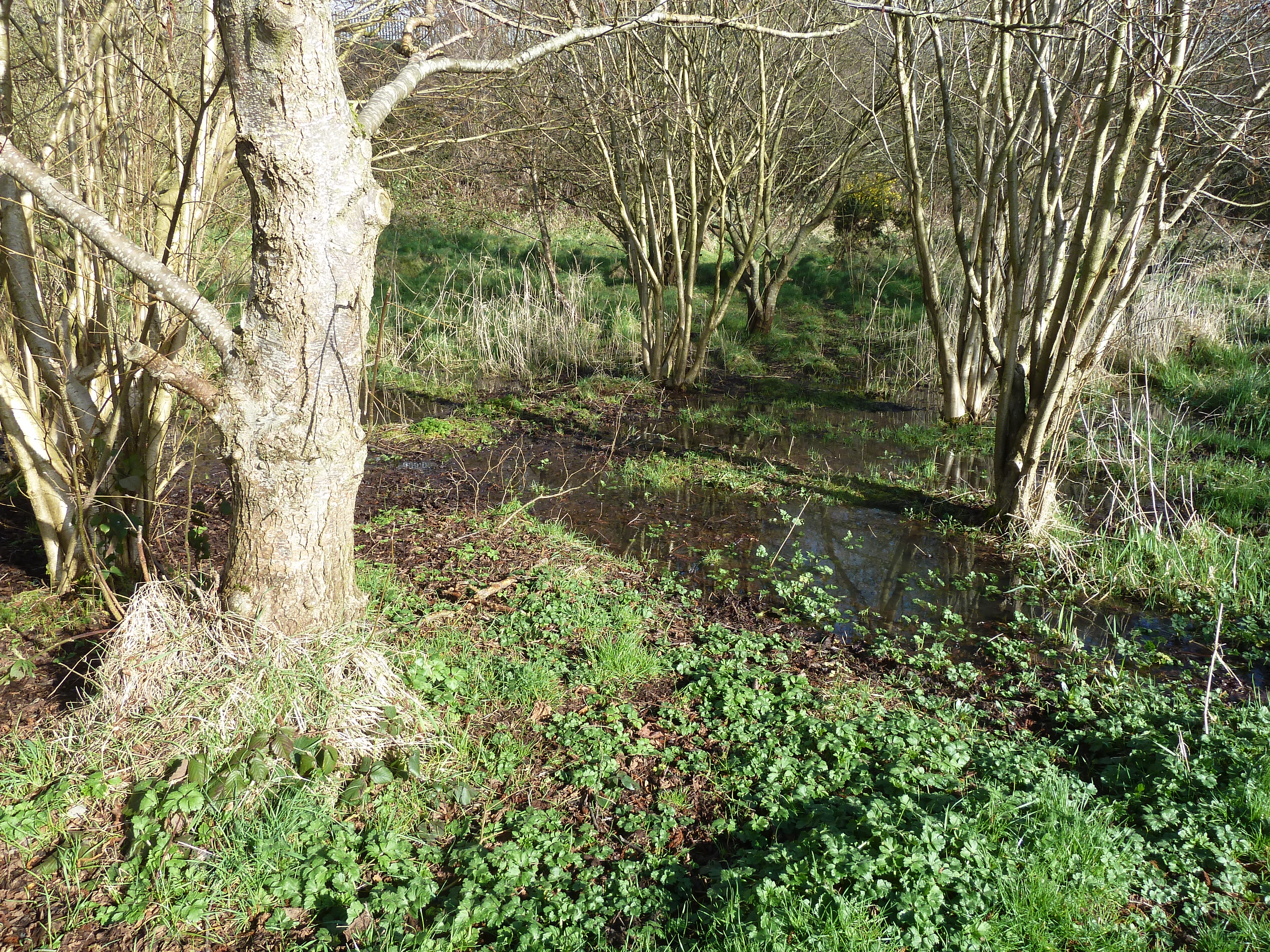
carr habitat in Ireland

== Biology ==
Habitat: Wetland; mire, fen, marsh, pool and lake edge; along brooks in Quercus ilex forest in southern Europe. Flowers visited include Ranunculaceae, white umbellifers, Cochlearia, Convolvulus, Leontodon, Polygonum, Symphoricarpos and Valeriana. The flight period is May to June and August to September. The larva is aquatic, living among submerged plant roots.
