= Chromocheilosia =

Scientific classification
- Kingdom: Animalia
- Phylum: Arthropoda
- Class: Insecta
- Order: Diptera
- Family: Syrphidae
- Subfamily: Eristalinae
- Tribe: Brachyopini
- Subtribe: Brachyopina
- Genus: Chromocheilosia; Hull, 1950

Type species
- Chilosia bicolor Shannon & Aubertin, 1933

Genus of flies

Chromocheilosia is a genus of South American hoverflies.

== Species List ==
- C. bicolor (Shannon & Aubertin, 1933)
- C. incerta (Shannon & Aubertin, 1933)
- C. pubescens (Shannon & Aubertin, 1933)
