= Liochrysogaster =

Scientific classification
- Kingdom: Animalia
- Phylum: Arthropoda
- Class: Insecta
- Order: Diptera
- Family: Syrphidae
- Subfamily: Eristalinae
- Tribe: Brachyopini
- Subtribe: Brachyopina
- Genus: Liochrysogaster; Stackelberg, 1924
- Species: L. przewalskii

Binomial name
- Liochrysogaster przewalskii Stackelberg, 1924

Genus of flies

Liochrysogaster is a genus of hoverflies. The only species is Liochrysogaster przewalskii.
