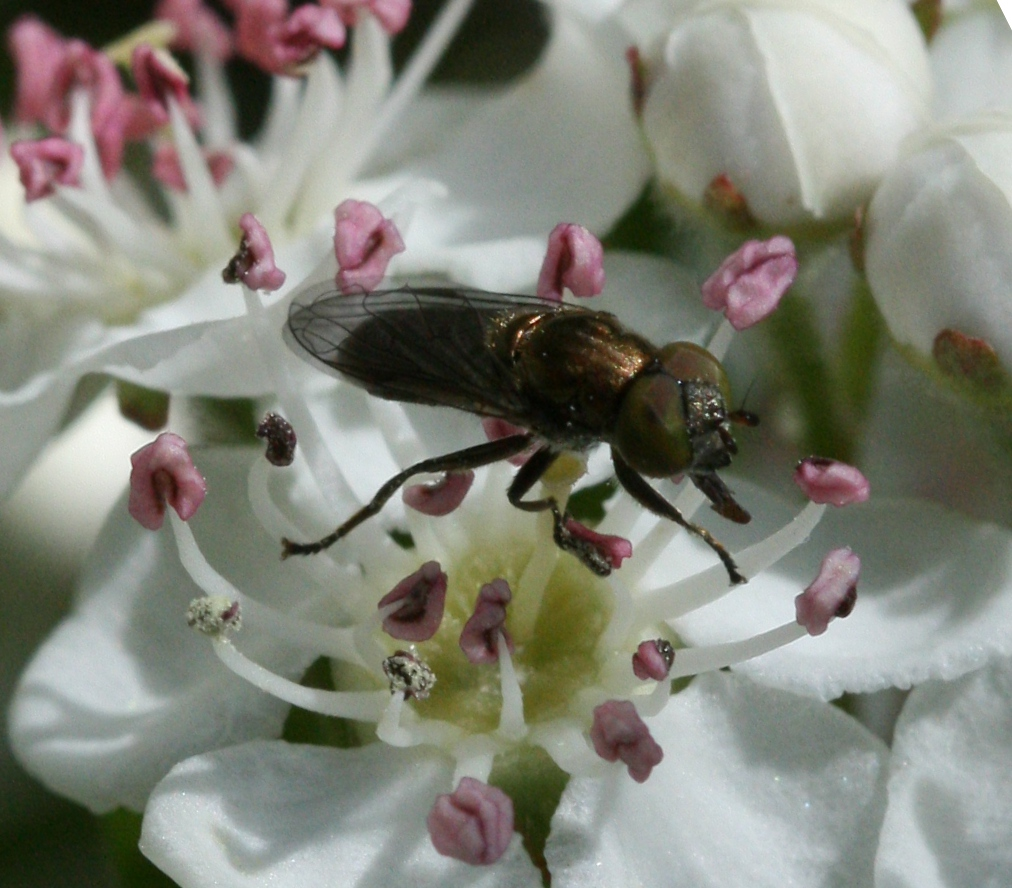
- Riponnensia splendens male

Scientific classification
- Kingdom: Animalia
- Phylum: Arthropoda
- Class: Insecta
- Order: Diptera
- Family: Syrphidae
- Subfamily: Eristalinae
- Tribe: Brachyopini
- Subtribe: Brachyopina
- Genus: Riponnensia; Maibach, Goeldlin & Speight, 1994

= Riponnensia =

Genus of flies

Riponnensia is a genus of hoverflies.

== Species ==
- Riponnensia daccordii (Claussen, 1991)
- Riponnensia insignis (Loew, 1843)
- Riponnensia longicornis (Loew, 1843)
- Riponnensia morini Vujic, 1999
- Riponnensia splendens (Meigen, 1822)
