= Cacoceria =

Scientific classification
- Kingdom: Animalia
- Phylum: Arthropoda
- Class: Insecta
- Order: Diptera
- Family: Syrphidae
- Subfamily: Eristalinae
- Tribe: Brachyopini
- Subtribe: Brachyopina
- Genus: Cacoceria; Hull, 1936

Type species
- Cacomyia cressoni Hull, 1936

Synonyms
- Cacomyia Hull, 1930

Genus of flies

Cacoceria is a genus of hoverflies.

== Species List ==
- C. cressoni (Hull, 1930)
- C. willistoni Hull, 1950
