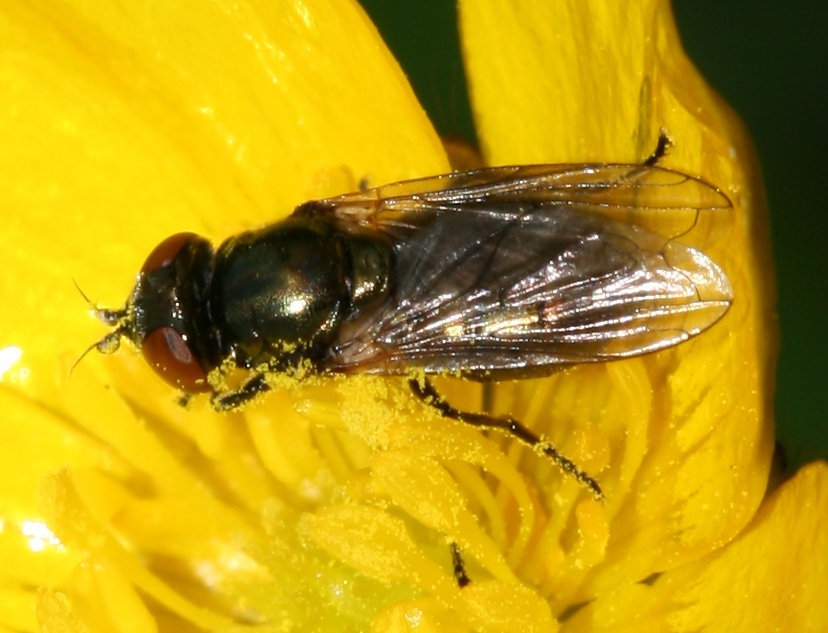
- Lejogaster tarsata Scotland

Scientific classification
- Kingdom: Animalia
- Phylum: Arthropoda
- Class: Insecta
- Order: Diptera
- Family: Syrphidae
- Genus: Lejogaster
- Species: L. tarsata

Binomial name
- Lejogaster tarsata (Meigen, 1822)

Synonyms
- Lejogaster splendida (Meigen, 1822)

= Lejogaster tarsata =

Species of fly

Lejogaster tarsata is a Palearctic hoverfly

== Description ==
External images For terms see Morphology of Diptera
The thorax and abdomen are lustrous metallic green to golden, frequently with reddish reflections. The tergite at the tip of the abdomen is yellowish-green with blue and purple reflections except around the margin. In the male the face lacks a median tubercle. The third segment of antennae below for greater or lesser part narrow and part yellow towards the tip. Middle segment of tarsi yellow. Body length 5.0 to 7.0 mm. The larva is described and figured by Rotheray (1994).

== Distribution ==
Scandinavia south to the Mediterranean basin. From Ireland east through Central Europe and Southern Europe into European Russia, Iran and Afghanistan, Uzbekistan, Tajikistan, Kirghizia, Turkmenia and Kazakhstan to Mongolia, Siberia and the Russian Far East.

== Habitat ==
Wetland, margins of streams and pools, springs and spring-fed ponds.

== Biology ==
Flies in a zigzag, darting fashion from May to August. Flowers visited are white umbellifers Matricaria, Ranunculus.
