= Hemilampra =

Scientific classification
- Kingdom: Animalia
- Phylum: Arthropoda
- Class: Insecta
- Order: Diptera
- Family: Syrphidae
- Subfamily: Eristalinae
- Tribe: Brachyopini
- Subtribe: Brachyopina
- Genus: Hemilampra; Macquart, 1950

Genus of flies

Hemilampra is a genus of hoverflies.

== Species ==
- Hemilampra australis Macquart, 1850
- Hemilampra dichoptica Thompson, 2003
- Hemilampra rectinervis (Meijere, 1908)
- Hemilampra rufonasus (Curran, 1926)
