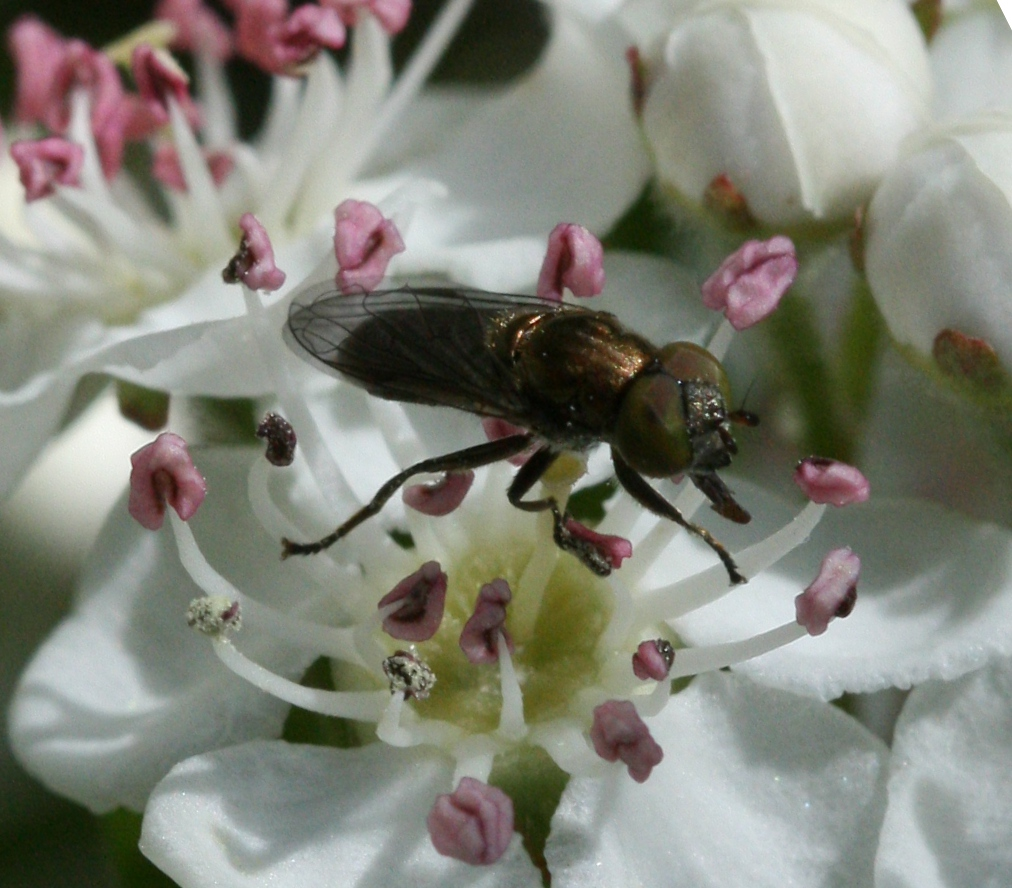

Scientific classification
- Kingdom: Animalia
- Phylum: Arthropoda
- Class: Insecta
- Order: Diptera
- Family: Syrphidae
- Genus: Riponnensia
- Species: R. splendens

Binomial name
- Riponnensia splendens (Meigen, 1822)

Synonyms
- Orthonevra splendens

= Riponnensia splendens =

Species of fly

Riponnensia splendens is a small metallic species of hoverfly. It is found in Europe.

== Description ==
External images For terms see Morphology of Diptera
Wing length 5·5–7 mm. Legs metallic green. 2 anterior longitudinal stripes of white dust on thorax dorsum. Antennomere 3 oval. See references for determination.

== Distribution ==
Palearctic Netherlands South to Mediterranean basin, Ireland eastwards Central Europe and Southern Europe into Greece, Turkey, the Crimea and the Caucasus mountains.

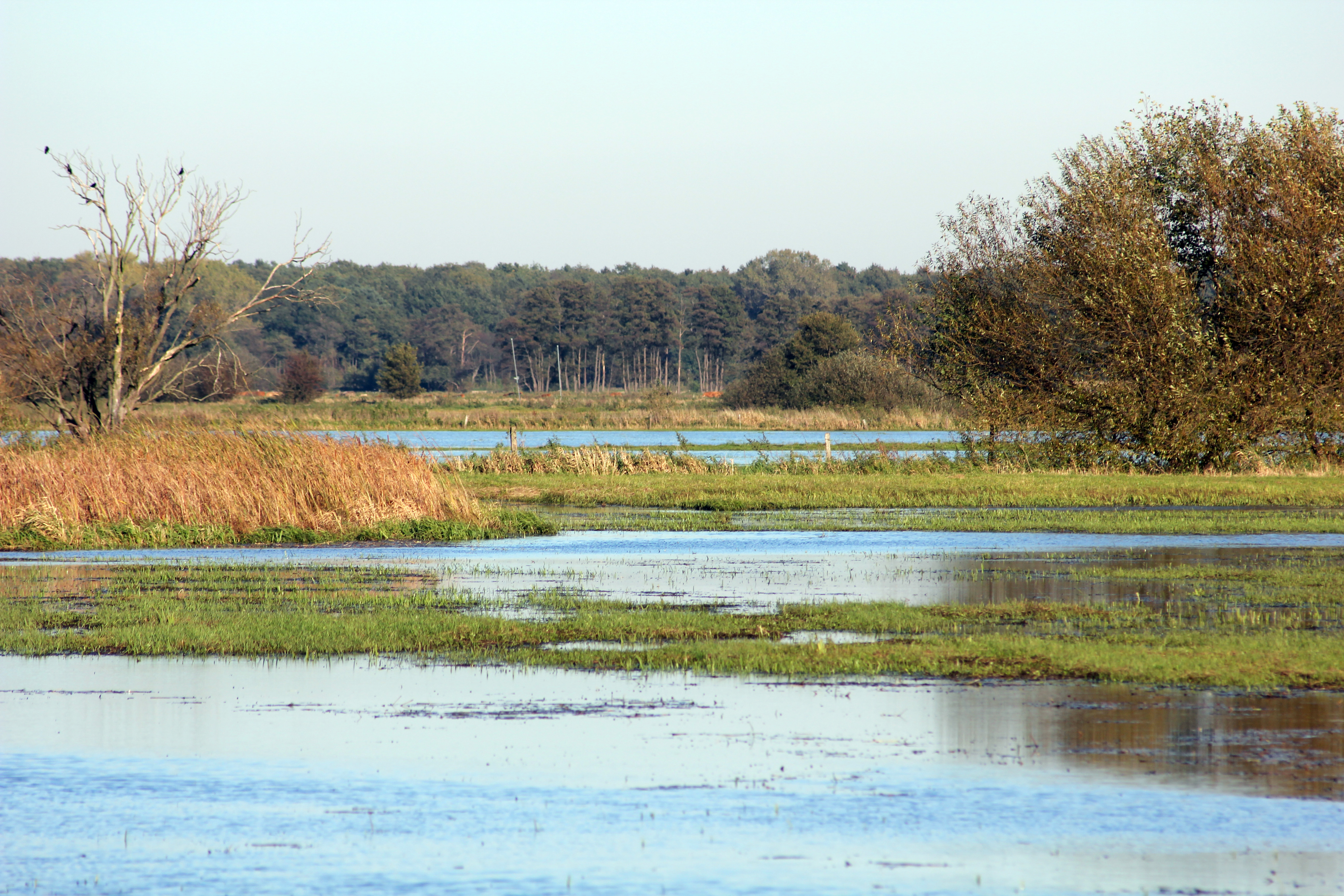
Habitat.Germany

== Biology ==
Habitat deciduous woodland and scrub with streams and springs andscrub or along hedged streams in farmland. Flies June to September.
