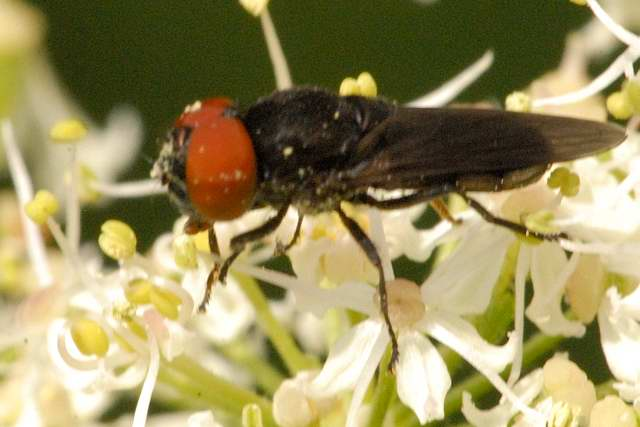
- male
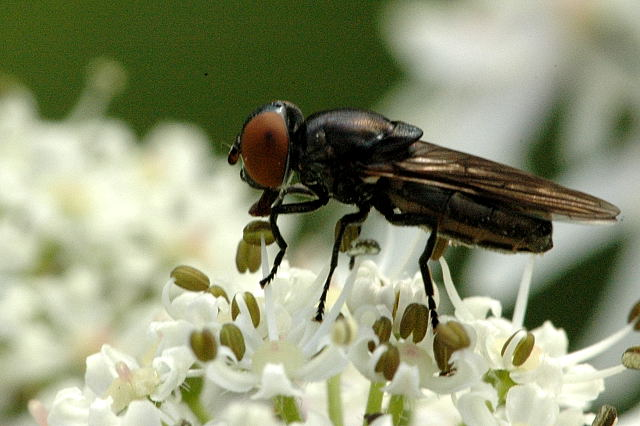
- female

Scientific classification
- Kingdom: Animalia
- Phylum: Arthropoda
- Class: Insecta
- Order: Diptera
- Family: Syrphidae
- Subfamily: Eristalinae
- Tribe: Brachyopini
- Subtribe: Brachyopina
- Genus: Chrysogaster
- Species: C. solstitialis

Binomial name
- Chrysogaster solstitialis (Fallén, 1817)

Synonyms
- Chrysogaster coemeteriorum Walker, 1851; Chrysogaster coemeteriorum var. fumosa Loew, 1840; Eristalis solstitialis Fallén, 1817

= Chrysogaster solstitialis =

Species of fly

Chrysogaster solstitialis is a European species of hoverfly.

== Description ==
External images For terms see Morphology of Diptera

Wing length 6-7·25 mm. Antennae reddish. In front view the distance between the eyes at most equal to the width of an eye. Wings blackish-tinged. Female thorax with purplish reflections. The male genitalia are figured by Maibach, A. & Goeldlin de Tiefenau (1994). The larva is illustrated by Rotheray (1993).

== Distribution ==
Palaearctic. Ranges from Fennoscandia South to Iberia and the Mediterranean basin, including North Africa. From Ireland Eastwards through of Europe into European parts of Russia, Ukraine and the Caucasus mountains.

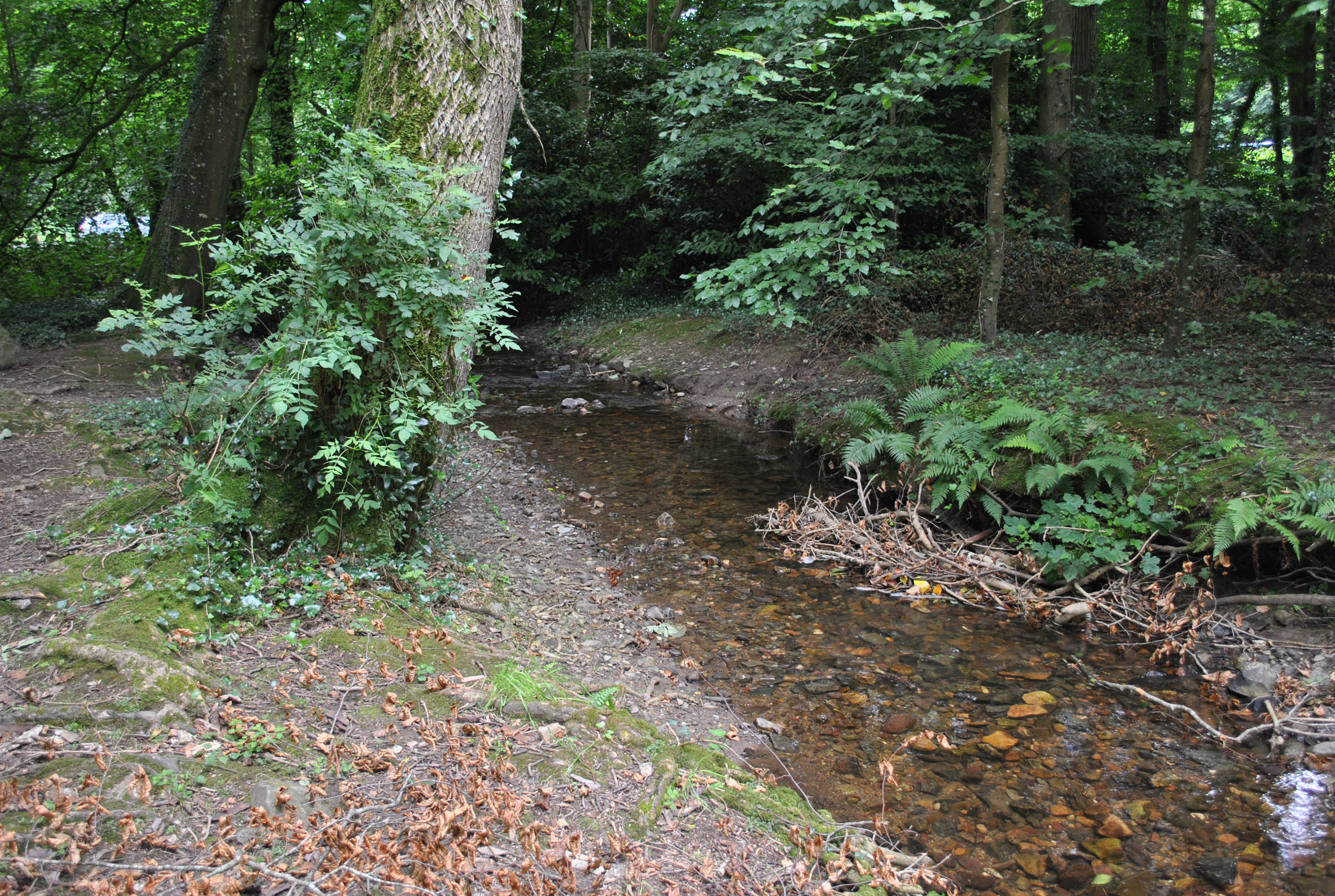
Habitat.Ireland.

== Biology ==
Habitat:Wetland and deciduous forest, woodland streams and ponds including Salix carr. Flowers visited include white umbellifers, Cornus, Filipendula, Galium, Sambucus, Senecio jacobaea. The flight period is June to September ( May in southern Europe). The larvae live in pond mud containing debris of fallen twigs and branches.
