= Cyphipelta =

Scientific classification
- Kingdom: Animalia
- Phylum: Arthropoda
- Class: Insecta
- Order: Diptera
- Family: Syrphidae
- Subfamily: Eristalinae
- Tribe: Brachyopini
- Subtribe: Brachyopina
- Genus: Cyphipelta; Bigot 1859

Genus of flies

Cyphipelta is a genus of Australian hoverflies.

== Species ==
- Cyphipelta conifrons Bigot, 1859
- Cyphipelta rufocyanea (Walker, 1835)
