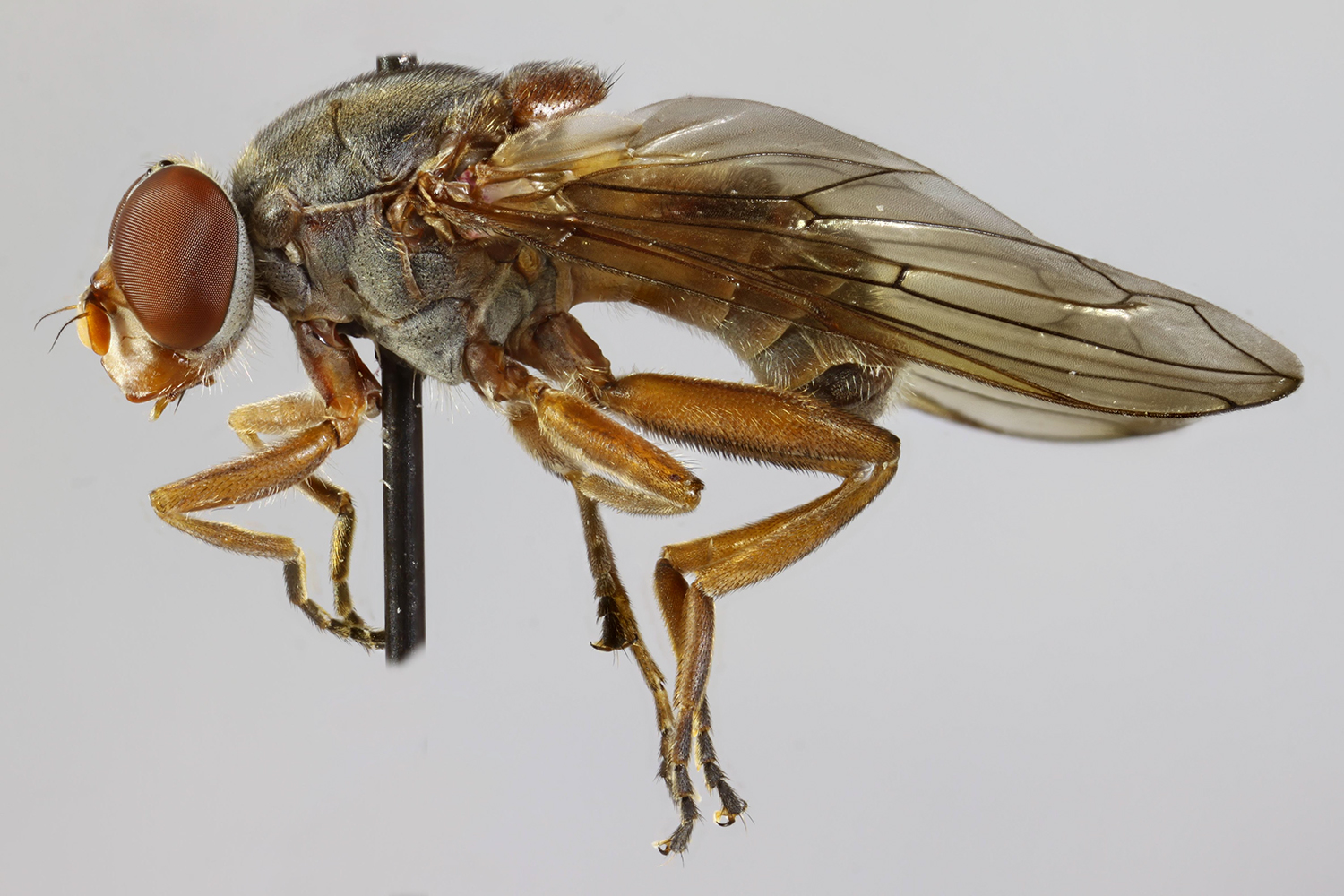
- Brachyopa scutellaris museum specimen
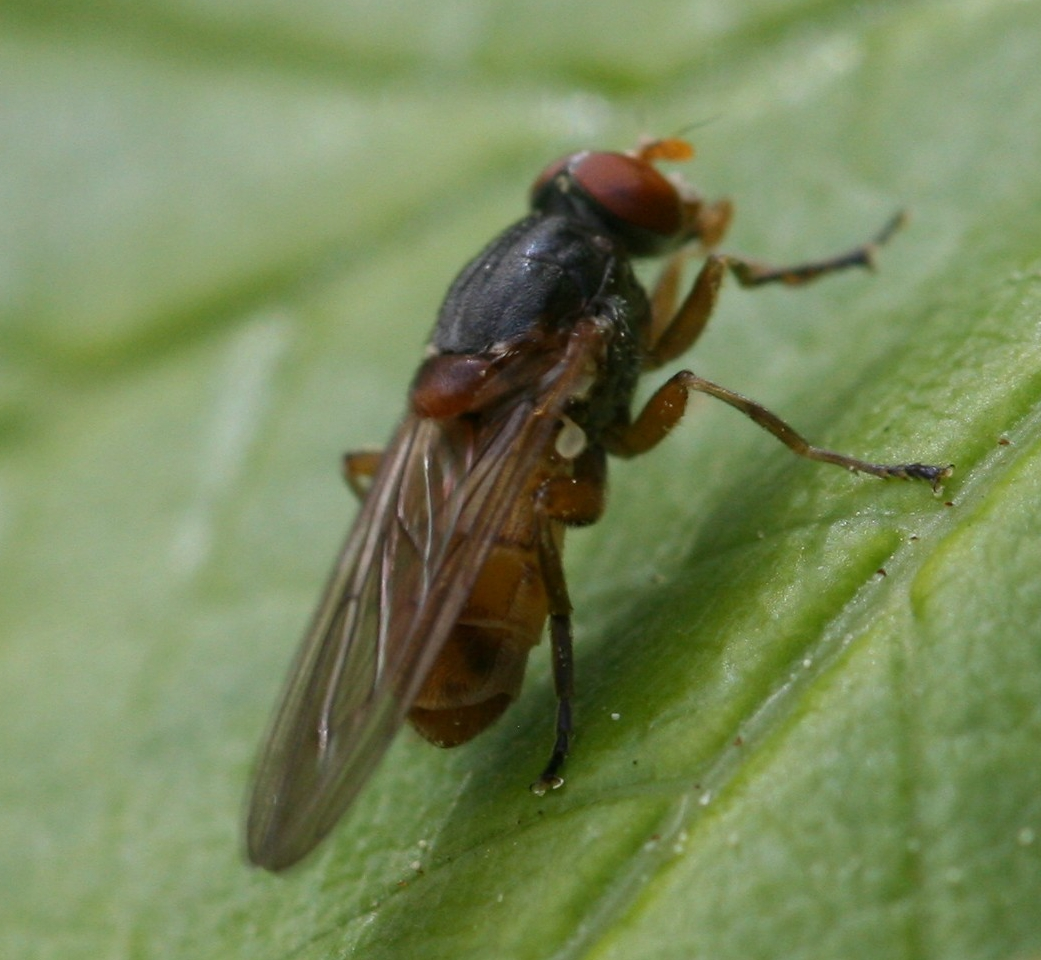
- Brachyopa sp.

Scientific classification
- Kingdom: Animalia
- Phylum: Arthropoda
- Class: Insecta
- Order: Diptera
- Family: Syrphidae
- Subfamily: Eristalinae
- Tribe: Brachyopini
- Subtribe: Brachyopina
- Genus: Brachyopa; Meigen, 1822

Type species
- Musca conica Panzer, 1798

Synonyms
- Barachopa Woodworth, 1913; Brachiopa Newman, 1834; Brachiopa Rondani, 1844

= Brachyopa =

Genus of flies

Brachyopa is a Holarctic genus of hoverflies whose grey and brown colouration is unusual for this family and these flies can easily be overlooked amongst members of other fly families. The larvae can be found under the bark of dead branches and trees in decaying sap.

== Species ==
Subgenus: Brachyopa
- Brachyopa atlantea Kassebeer, 2000
- Brachyopa bicolor (Fallén, 1817)
- Brachyopa bimaculosa Doczkal & Dziock, 2004
- Brachyopa caesariata Moran & Skevington, 2019
- Brachyopa cinerea Wahlberg, 1844
- Brachyopa cinereovittata Bigot, 1884
- Brachyopa cruriscutum Steenis & Steenis, 2014
- Brachyopa cummingi Moran & Skevington, 2019
- Brachyopa cynops Snow, 1892
- Brachyopa daeckei Johnson, 1917
- Brachyopa diversa Johnson, 1917
- Brachyopa dorsata Zetterstedt, 1837
- Brachyopa exigua Steenis, 2015
- Brachyopa flavescens Shannon, 1915
- Brachyopa gigas Lovett, 1919
- Brachyopa grunewaldensis Kassebeer, 2000
- Brachyopa insensilis Collin, 1939
- Brachyopa maculipennis Thompson, 1980
- Brachyopa maritima Violovitsh, 1980
- Brachyopa media Williston, 1882
- Brachyopa minima Vujic & Pérez-Bañón, 2016
- Brachyopa notata Osten Sacken, 1875
- Brachyopa obscura Thompson & Torp, 1982
- Brachyopa ornamentosa Violovitsh, 1977
- Brachyopa panzeri Goffe, 1945
- Brachyopa paradoxa Krivosheina, 2004
- Brachyopa perplexa Curran, 1922
- Brachyopa pilosa Collin, 1939
- Brachyopa pivanica Mutin, 1984
- Brachyopa plena Collin, 1939
- Brachyopa primorica Mutin, 1998
- Brachyopa punctipennis Curran, 1925
- Brachyopa quadrimaculosa Thompson, 1981
- Brachyopa rufiabdominalis Jones, 1917
- Brachyopa scutellaris Robineau-Desvoidy, 1843
- Brachyopa silviae Doczkal & Dziock, 2004
- Brachyopa stackelbergi Krivosheina, 2004
- Brachyopa tabarkensis Kassebeer, 2002
- Brachyopa testacea (Fallén, 1817)
- Brachyopa tianzhuensis Li & Li, 1990
- Brachyopa vacua Osten Sacken, 1875
- Brachyopa vernalis Steenis & Steenis, 2014
- Brachyopa violovitshi Mutin, 1985
- Brachyopa vittata Zetterstedt, 1843
- Brachyopa zhelochovtsevi Mutin, 1998

Subgenus: Trichobrachyopa

- Brachyopa tristis Kassebeer, 2001
