= Lepidomyia =

Scientific classification
- Kingdom: Animalia
- Phylum: Arthropoda
- Class: Insecta
- Order: Diptera
- Family: Syrphidae
- Tribe: Brachyopini
- Genus: Lepidomyia; Loew 1864

Genus of flies

Lepidomyia is a genus of hoverflies

== Species ==
- L. abdominalis (Williston, 1888)
- L. calopus (Loew, 1864)
- L. cincta Bigot, 1883
- L. lugens
- L. micheneri (Fluke, 1888)
- L. ortalina (Wulp, 1888)
- L. strigosellacola
- L. trilineata (Hull, 1941)
