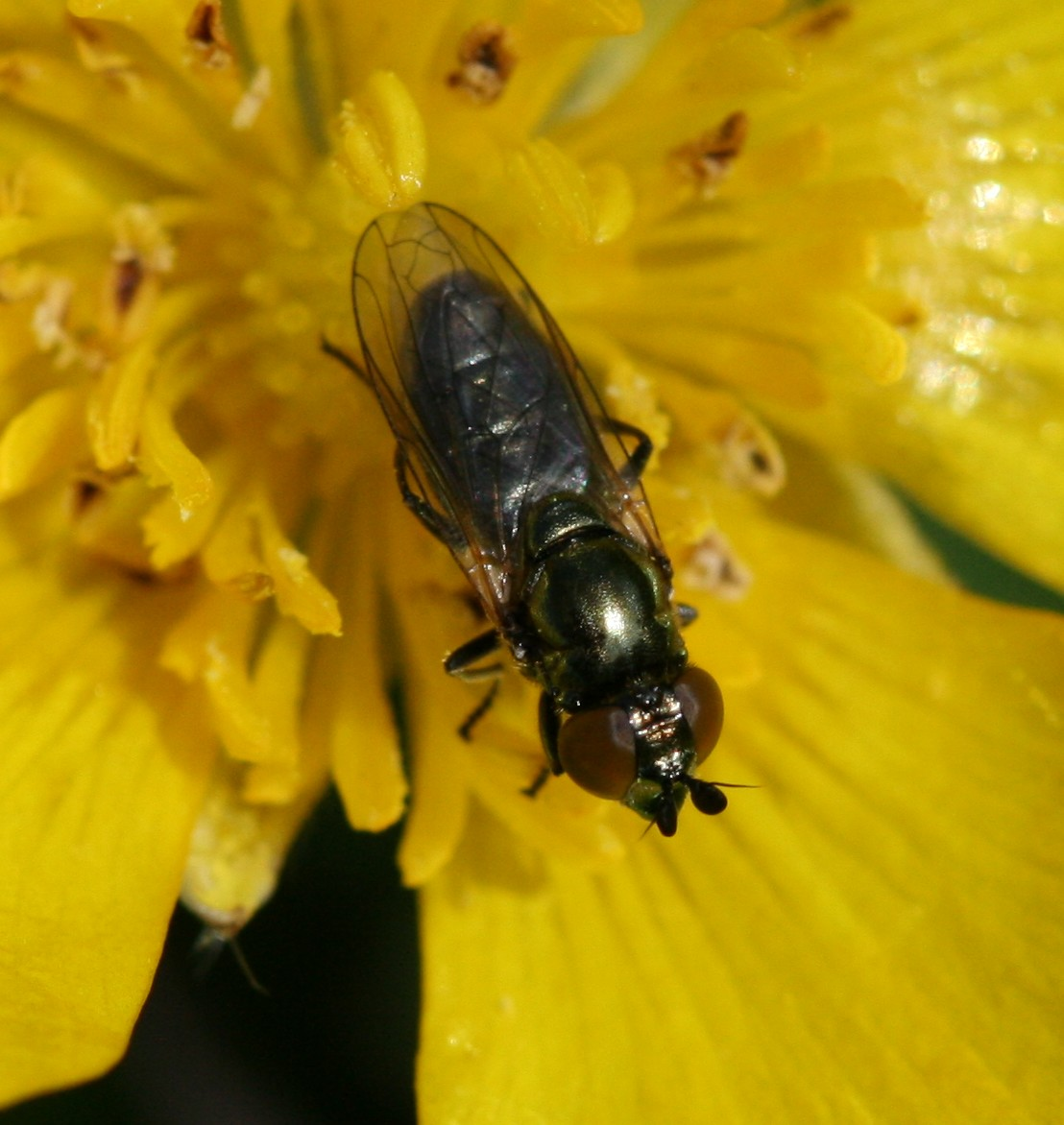
- Lejogaster metallina

Scientific classification
- Kingdom: Animalia
- Phylum: Arthropoda
- Class: Insecta
- Order: Diptera
- Family: Syrphidae
- Tribe: Brachyopini
- Genus: Lejogaster; Rondani, 1857

Type species
- Chrysogaster tarsata Meigen, 1822

Synonyms
- Liogaster Verrall, 1882; Sulcatella Goffe, 1944

= Lejogaster =

Genus of flies

Lejogaster is a genus of small, shiny, metallic hoverflies.

== Species ==
- L. metallina (Fabricius, 1781)
- L. nigricans (Stackelberg, 1922)
- L. tarsata (Meigen, 1822)
