= Holoptic arrangement =

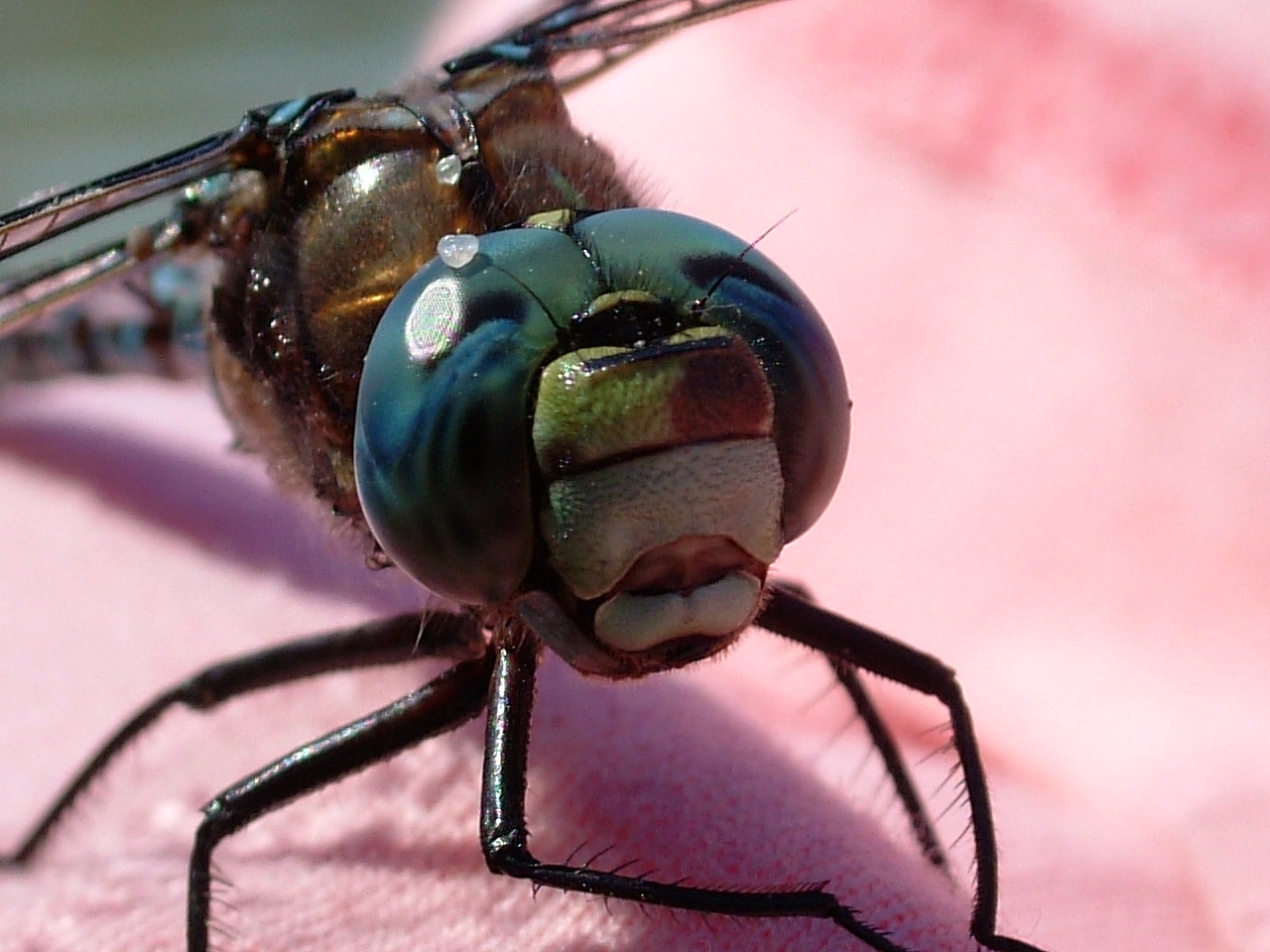
Holoptic Anisoptera

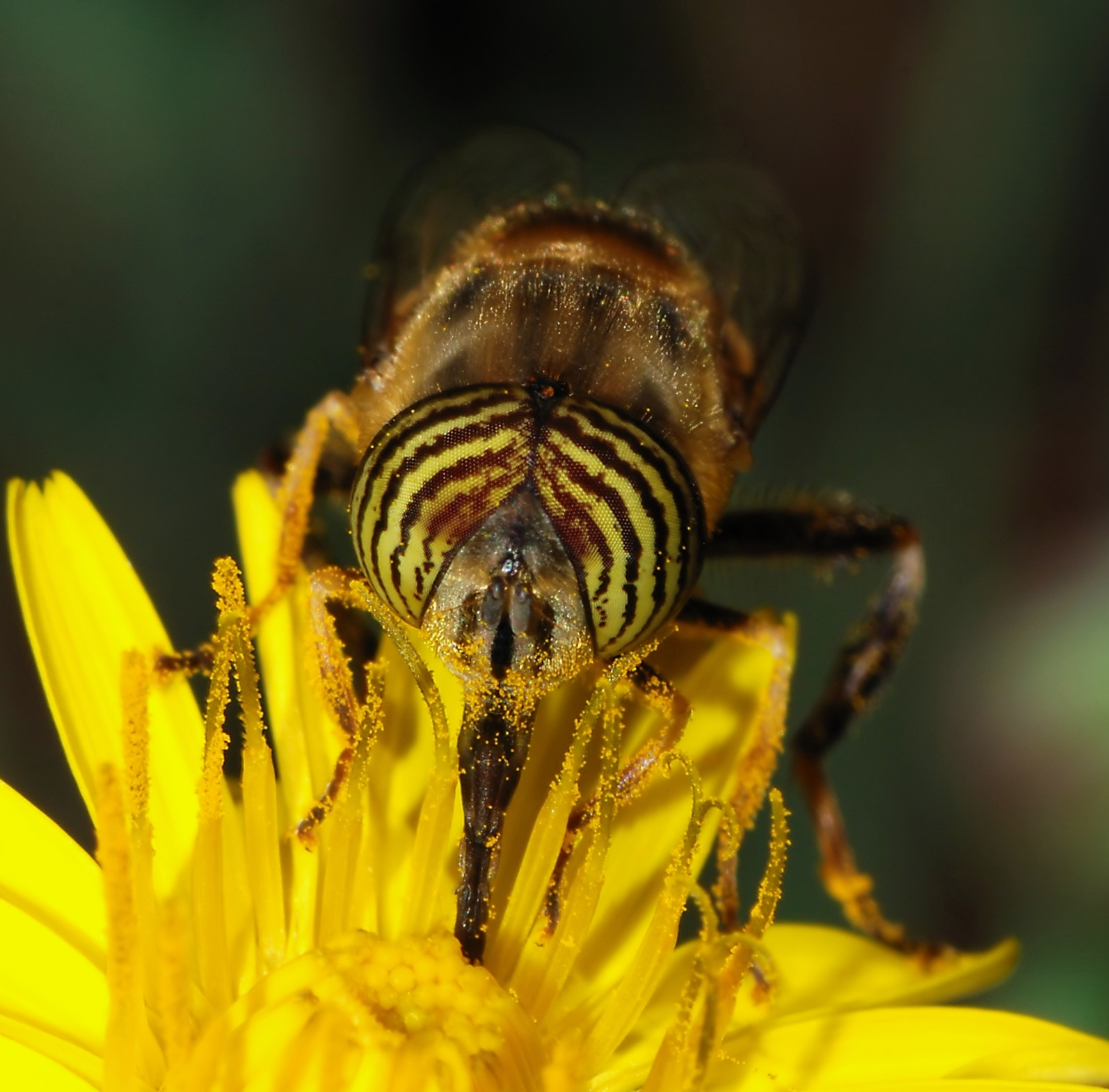
Holoptic eyes of a male syrphid (Eristalinus taeniops)

A holoptic arrangement is one of the ways in which the arthropod eye develops, particularly in the compound eyes of various species of insects. Unlike dichoptic and cycloptic eyes, holoptic eyes meet along the median dorsal line of the head, in many species nearly covering the exterior of the head. Holoptic eyes are typical of several Dipteran males, in particular some Syrphidae, Tabanidae, Pipunculidae, and Acroceridae. Some other insect orders include species with holoptic males, and there are some in which the females are holoptic as well, include the Coleoptera, Anisoptera, and Archaeognatha.
