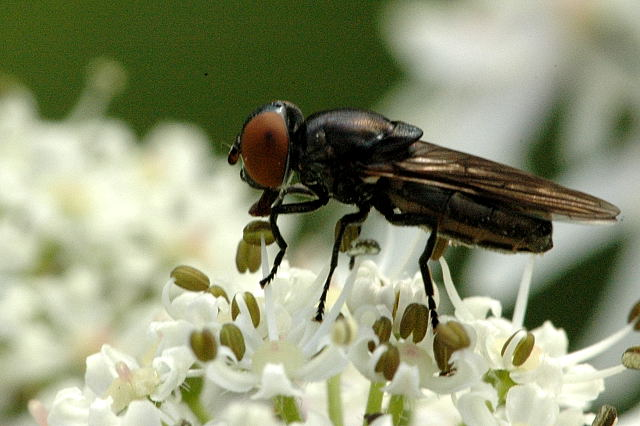
- Chrysogaster solstitialis

Scientific classification
- Kingdom: Animalia
- Phylum: Arthropoda
- Class: Insecta
- Order: Diptera
- Family: Syrphidae
- Subfamily: Eristalinae
- Tribe: Brachyopini
- Subtribe: Brachyopina; Williston, 1885

Genera
- See text

= Brachyopina =

Tribe of flies

The Brachyopina is a subtribe of hoverflies.

== List of genera ==
- Brachyopa Meigen, 1822
- Cacoceria Hull, 1936
- Chromocheilosia Hull, 1950
- Chrysogaster Meigen, 1803
- Chrysosyrphus Sedman, 1965
- Cyphipelta Bigot, 1859
- Hammerschmidtia Fallén, 1817
- Hemilampra Macquart, 1850
- Lejogaster Rondani, 1857
- Lepidomyia Loew, 1864
- Liochrysogaster Stackelberg, 1924
- Melanogaster Rondani, 1857
- Myolepta Loew, 1864
- Orthonevra Macquart, 1829
- Riponnensia Maibach, 1994
