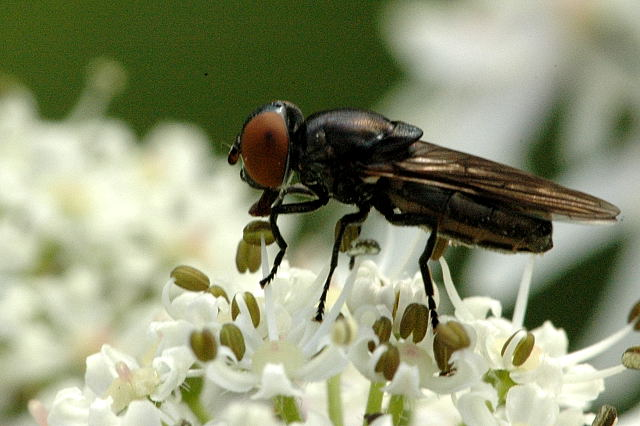
- Chrysogaster solstitialis

Scientific classification
- Kingdom: Animalia
- Phylum: Arthropoda
- Class: Insecta
- Order: Diptera
- Family: Syrphidae
- Subfamily: Eristalinae
- Tribe: Brachyopini; Williston, 1885

Genera
- See text

= Brachyopini =

Tribe of flies

The Brachyopini (or Chrysogastrini) is a tribe of hoverflies. Unlike many members of this family these flies are generally darker and less colourful though some genera contain species with an attractive metallic lustre e.g. Chrysogaster. Some like Brachyopa are associated with sap runs where their larvae feed on decaying sap. Others are found in boggy areas where their often semiaquatic larvae feed on decaying organic matter.

== List of genera ==
Subtribe: Brachyopina

- Brachyopa Meigen, 1822
- Cacoceria Hull, 1936
- Chromocheilosia Hull, 1950
- Chrysogaster Meigen, 1803
- Chrysosyrphus Sedman, 1965
- Cyphipelta Bigot, 1859
- Hammerschmidtia Fallén, 1817
- Hemilampra Macquart, 1850
- Lejogaster Rondani, 1857
- Lepidomyia Loew, 1864
- Liochrysogaster Stackelberg, 1924
- Melanogaster Rondani, 1857
- Myolepta Loew, 1864
- Orthonevra Macquart, 1829
- Riponnensia Maibach, 1994

Subtribe: Spheginina

- Austroascia Thompson & Marnef, 1977
- Chamaesphegina Shannon & Aubertin, 1933
- Neoascia Williston, 1887
- Sphegina Meigen, 1822

== Bibliography ==
- BioSystematic Database of World Diptera
