= Sphegina bidens =

Scientific classification
- Kingdom: Animalia
- Phylum: Arthropoda
- Clade: Pancrustacea
- Class: Insecta
- Order: Diptera
- Family: Syrphidae
- Genus: Sphegina
- Species: S. bidens

Binomial name
- Sphegina bidens Hippa, Steenis & Mutin, 2015

Species of fly

Sphegina (Asiosphegina) bidens is a species of hoverfly in the family Syrphidae found in Myanmar.

== Etymology ==
The name comes from Latin 'bidens', meaning 'two-toothed', referring to the two-toothed postero-dorsal part of the male superior lobe.

== Description ==
In male specimens, body length is 6.5 to 7.9 millimeters and wing length is 5.7 to 6.5 millimeters. The face is strongly concave with a moderately developed frontal prominence. The gena is shiny yellow; frons and vertex weakly shiny and dark brown; lunula brownish; occiput dull black; antenna entirely yellow; thorax dull black or mainly brown; scutellum trapezoid; pro- and mesoleg yellow, sometimes tarsomere five brownish; metaleg with coxa brownish, trochanter brownish, femur yellow with the apex and a ventrally interrupted annulus on the basal 1/2 brownish, tibia without apico-ventral tooth, brownish except the basal 1/4 and a broad annulus on the apical 1/2 yellow, tarsus dark brown. The wings are hyaline, stigma yellowish, transversal veins infuscated. The basal flagellomere is oval and the arista is pilose.

== Related species ==
S. (A.) bidens resembles S. (A.) forficata, S. (A.) crucivena, S. (A.) nasuta, and S. (A.) simplex, but is not closely similar to any of them and differs from all by the male genitalia, especially by having a bifid apex of the superior lobe and apically expanded aedeagal lobe. S. (A.) bidens is also similar to S. (A.) orientalis, but the latter differs by having dark (not pale) pro- and metatarsus, simple (not apically bifid) superior lobe, and by very narrow aedeagal lobe, similar to that of S. (A.) nasuta.
