= Sphegina collicola =

Scientific classification
- Kingdom: Animalia
- Phylum: Arthropoda
- Clade: Pancrustacea
- Class: Insecta
- Order: Diptera
- Family: Syrphidae
- Genus: Sphegina
- Subgenus: Asiosphegina
- Species: S. collicola

Binomial name
- Sphegina collicola Hippa, Steenis & Mutin, 2018

Species of fly

Sphegina collicola is a species of hoverfly found in Malaysia.

== Etymology ==
The name comes from Latin ‘collicola’, meaning ‘inhabitant of hills’, referring to its initial discovery in a hillside habitat.

== Description ==
In male specimens, the body length is 5.8 to 6.0 millimeters. The wings are 5.1 to 5.4 millimeters long and hyaline, entirely microtrichose with yellowish stigma. The face is black and concave with long pilose along the eye-margin, less projected antero-ventrally than the (weakly developed) frontal prominence. The gena and mouth edge are black, with a large subtriangular non-pollinose shiny area; frons and vertex black, with a narrow oval area posterior of the lunula shiny and non-pollinose; occiput black with light yellow pilose; antenna with scape and pedicel black; basal flagellomere dark brown and oval with several black setae dorsally on scape and pedicel; thorax black; scutellum black and sublunalar; pro- and mesoleg yellow, tarsomeres 4 and 5 brown; metaleg with coxa black, trochanter yellow; metafemur with basal 1/6 yellow and incrassate; metatibia yellow with apical ⅓ black and short pointed apicoventral dens; metatarsus entirely black with thick basal tarsomere. The arista is long and pilose, about 2.5 times as long as the basal flagellomere. No female specimens are known.

== Related Species ==
S. collicola is similar to S. bifida and S. inventum, though it's differentiated from the latter by having the more posterior one of the ventral tooth-like projections on the marginal superior lobe instead of the right, and by having the respective projection on the left side superior lobe small and rounded instead of large and sharp.
