= Sphegina albolobata =

Scientific classification
- Kingdom: Animalia
- Phylum: Arthropoda
- Clade: Pancrustacea
- Class: Insecta
- Order: Diptera
- Family: Syrphidae
- Tribe: Brachyopini
- Subtribe: Spheginina
- Genus: Sphegina
- Species: S. albolobata

Binomial name
- Sphegina albolobata Hippa, Steenis & Mutin, 2018

Species of hoverfly

Sphegina (Asiosphegina) albolobata is a species of hoverfly in the genus Sphegina found in Vietnam. It's similar to S. (A.) licina, but differs by having the ventral lobe of both gonostyli narrower, apicodorsal part of the right superior lobe shorter, and the ventral part of the left superior lobe with more prominent anterior, medial, and posterior lobes.

== Etymology ==
The name comes from Latin ‘albolobata’, meaning ‘white-lobed’, referring to the white subtriangular lobe posteriorly on the male sternum IV.

== Description ==
In male specimens, the body length is 6.0 millimetres and the wing length is 4.9 millimetres. The face is concave with a strongly developed frontal prominence. The face is black, ventral half yellow; occiput black; basal flagellomere dark yellow; scape and pedicel yellow with black setae dorsally; thorax dark brown to black; scutellum black and semi-lunular, sub-shiny and weakly pollinose; pro- and mesoleg yellow, tarsomeres 2–5 black; metaleg with black coxa and yellow trochanter; metafemur black and yellow biannulate, slightly incrassate; metatibia black and yellow biannulate, with short rounded apicoventral dens; metatarsus entirely black, basal tarsomere thick. A large round area posterior of the lunula is non-pollinose and shiny. The basal flagellomere is oval, the arista short and pilose, nearly three 3 times as long as the basal flagellomere. No female specimens have been found.
