= Sphegina achaeta =

Scientific classification
- Kingdom: Animalia
- Phylum: Arthropoda
- Clade: Pancrustacea
- Class: Insecta
- Order: Diptera
- Family: Syrphidae
- Genus: Sphegina
- Species: S. achaeta

Binomial name
- Sphegina achaeta Hippa, Steenis & Mutin, 2015

Species of fly

Sphegina (Asiosphegina) achaeta is a species of hoverfly in the family Syrphidae found in Myanmar. It's easily identified by the weak setae on abdominal tergite I. It's similar in appearance to S. adusta but easily differentiated upon closer examination. The male genitalia are similar to S. pollex and S. culex, though it can be distinguished by having an acute posterodorsal corner of the superior lobe and a broader surstylus; it differs further from S. pollex by lacking a sub-basal dorsal thumb-like lobe. The arrangement of bristles on tergite I is similar to S. japonica.

== Etymology ==
The name comes from the Greek words 'a', meaning 'without', and 'chaite', meaning 'long hair', referring to the lack of strong setae laterally on tergite I.

== Description ==
In male specimens, the body length is 6.1 to 7.2 millimeters and the wing length is 5.5 to 6.3 millimeters. The face is concave with a strongly developed frontal prominence. The occiput is black; gena and mouth edge dark brown with large subtriangular non-pollinose shiny area; antenna dark brown with black setae dorsally on scape and pedicel; thorax dark brown to black; postpronotum red-brown; scutellum black and semi-circular; pro- and mesoleg with femora and tibiae dark brown to black on apical 2/3 to 3/4; pro- and meso- tarsi with tarsomeres 2–5 black; metaleg with dark brown coxa, yellow trochanter; dark brown metafemur with basal 1/4 yellow, incrassate; metatibia black and yellow biannulate, without apicoventral dens; metatarsus entirely black with a thin basal tarsomere. The basal flagellomere is short and oval and the arista is pilose, slightly more than 2.5 times as long as the basal flagellomere. No female specimens are known.
