= Sphegina abbreviata =

Scientific classification
- Kingdom: Animalia
- Phylum: Arthropoda
- Clade: Pancrustacea
- Class: Insecta
- Order: Diptera
- Family: Syrphidae
- Subfamily: Eristalinae
- Tribe: Brachyopini
- Subtribe: Spheginina
- Genus: Sphegina
- Species: S. abbreviata

Binomial name
- Sphegina abbreviata Steenis, Hippa & Mutin, 2018

Species of fly

Sphegina abbreviata is a species of hoverfly in the family Syrphidae found in Nepal. Like other species in its genus, S. abbreviata is small, slender, and usually found in and around woodlands. It's similar to S. angustata, though it's differentiated by having both dorsal and ventral sublobes posteriorly on male superior lobe instead of just a dorsal one, and by having the dorsal sublobes be apically short and truncate instead of long and pointed.

== Etymology ==
The name comes from Latin ‘abbreviata’, meaning ‘shortened’, referring to the unusually short abdomen.

== Description ==
In male specimens, S. abbreviata has a body length of 4.6 millimeters and wing length of 4.7 millimeters. The occiput is brown; gena and mouth edge yellow; antennae dark brown, with black setae dorsally on scape and pedicel; thorax dark brown; scutellum dark brown and subtriangular; metafemur dark brown with basal ⅓ yellow, very weakly incrassate; metatibia dark brown and yellow biannulate. A subtriangular area posterior of the lunula is non-pollinose and shiny. The wings are glossy and translucent, covered entirely in small hairs, and have yellowish stigma. The arista is short and relatively thick, covered in long, soft hairs, about 2.0 to 2.5 times as long as the basal flagellomere.

Female specimens are much the same except for normal sexual dimorphism; they have a body length of 4.9 to 5.4 millimetres and wing length of 5.4 to 6.1 millimetres. The metafemur is brown with basal ½ yellow, slender, and evenly incrassate. The arista is short and relatively thick, covered in long, soft hairs, about three times as long as the basal flagellomere.
