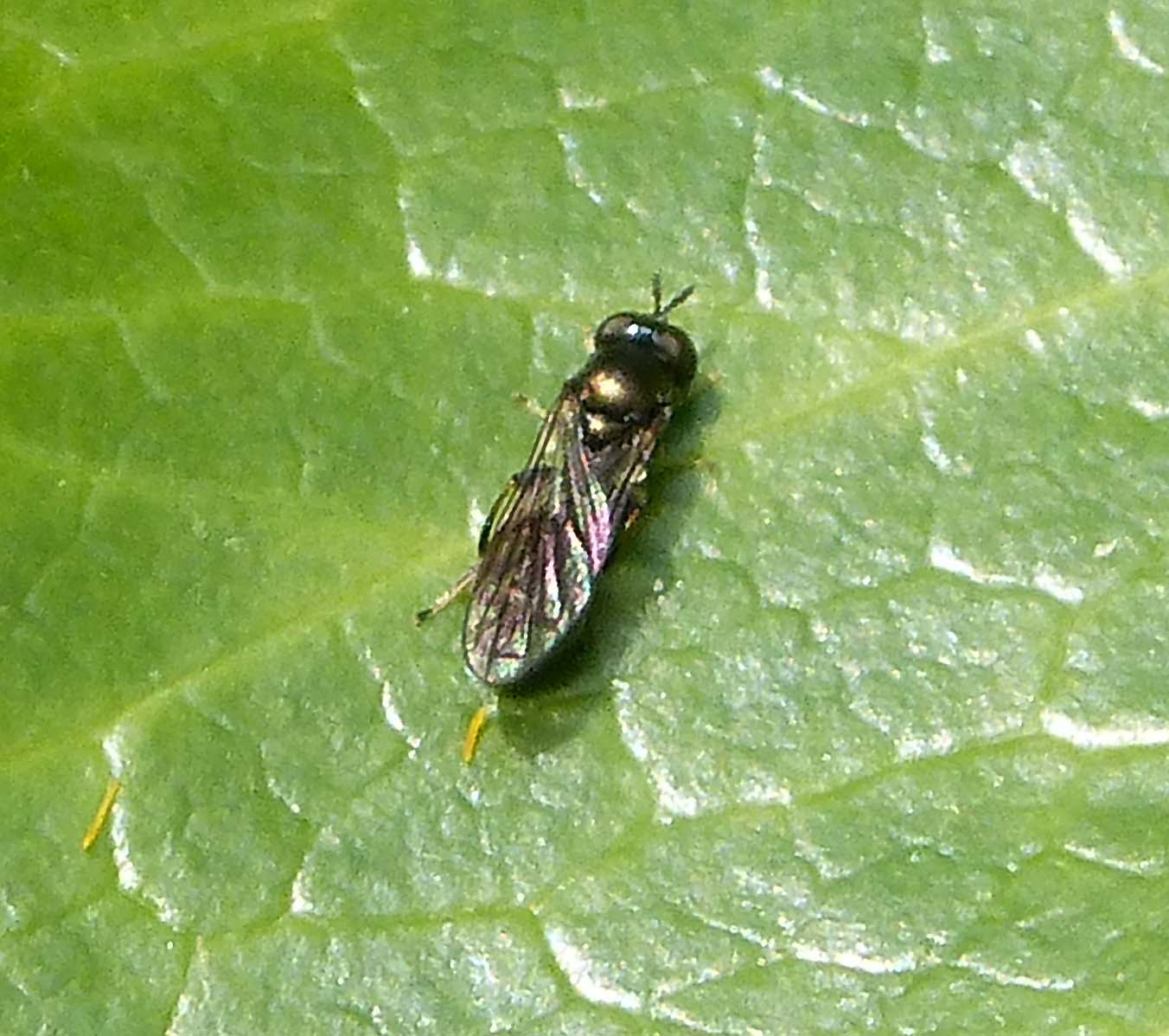

Scientific classification
- Kingdom: Animalia
- Phylum: Arthropoda
- Class: Insecta
- Order: Diptera
- Family: Syrphidae
- Subfamily: Eristalinae
- Tribe: Brachyopini
- Subtribe: Spheginina
- Genus: Neoascia
- Species: N. obliqua

Binomial name
- Neoascia obliqua Coe, 1940

= Neoascia obliqua =

Species of fly

Neoascia obliqua is a Palearctic species of hoverfly.

== Description ==
External images For terms see Morphology of Diptera
The 3rd segment of the antenna is elongated-oval as in N. podagrica F. (length exceeding width by 2.0 to 2.5). Yellow spots along sides of tergite 4 are absent. Surstyli are irregularly trapezoidal.

== Distribution ==
Scandinavia South to the Pyrenees. Ireland East through Central Europe, European Russia, Yugoslavia and the Caucasus.

== Habitat ==
Wetlands and wet places with tall herb communities.

== Biology ==
Flies among vegetation along the water's edge from the end of Aprilto th beginning of August. Flowers visited white umbellifers, Galium, Ranunculus, Taraxacum.
