= Sphegina angustata =

Scientific classification
- Kingdom: Animalia
- Phylum: Arthropoda
- Clade: Pancrustacea
- Class: Insecta
- Order: Diptera
- Family: Syrphidae
- Subfamily: Eristalinae
- Tribe: Brachyopini
- Subtribe: Spheginina
- Genus: Sphegina
- Species: S. angustata

Binomial name
- Sphegina angustata Steenis, Hippa & Mutin, 2018

Species of fly

Sphegina angustata is a species of hoverfly in the family Syrphidae found in Nepal. It's similar to S. abbreviata, though it's differentiated by having only a dorsal sublobe posteriorly on the male superior lobe instead of both dorsal and ventral, and by having the dorsal sublobe be long and pointed instead of apically short and truncate.

== Etymology ==
The name comes form Latin ‘angustata’, meaning ‘narrowed’, referring to the unusually narrow abdomen.

== Description ==
In male specimens, the body length is 5.2 to 5.4 millimeters and the wing length is 4.9 to 5.2 millimeters. The face is concave with a very strongly developed frontal prominence. The occiput is brown with soft, light yellow hairs; the face is dull dark brown, ventral half light-brown to yellow; gena and mouth edge yellow; antenna dark brown, with black setae dorsally on scape and pedicel; thorax dark brown; scutellum dark brown and subtriangular; the metaleg is dark brown with yellow; metafemur dark brown on basal 2/5, weakly incrassate; metatibia club shaped, black and yellow biannulate, without apicoventral dens. A subtriangular area posterior of lunula is non-pollinose and shiny. The wings are glossy and translucent, covered entirely in small hairs, and have yellowish stigma. The basal flagellomere is oval and the arista is short and relatively thick, covered in long, soft hairs, about 2.0–2.5 times as long as basal flagellomere.

Female specimens are much the same except for normal sexual dimorphism; they have a body length of 4.8 to 5.2 millimeters and wing length of 5.0 to 5.5 millimeters. The metafemur is slender, only very slightly incrassate, and the basal flagellomere is round to slightly oval. The arista is short and relatively thick, covered in long, soft hairs, about 2.5 times as long as the basal flagellomere.
