= Neoascia geniculata =

Scientific classification
- Kingdom: Animalia
- Phylum: Arthropoda
- Class: Insecta
- Order: Diptera
- Family: Syrphidae
- Subfamily: Eristalinae
- Tribe: Brachyopini
- Subtribe: Spheginina
- Genus: Neoascia
- Species: N. geniculata

Binomial name
- Neoascia geniculata (Meigen, 1822)

Synonyms
- Ascia geniculata Meigen, 1822; Neoascia conica Curran, 1925; Neoascia macrofemoralis Curran, 1925; Neoascia orientalis Violovich, 1957

Species of fly

Neoascia geniculata is a Palearctic species of hoverfly.

== Description ==
External images For terms see Morphology of Diptera
The 3rd segment of the antenna is rounded-oval (length barely exceeding width). The hypopygium is clothed with white hairs. Abdomen blackish bronzy in male with fairly broad reddish yellow bands on tergite 3; in female bronzy with black dots over greater part of tergite 3 (latter character distinguishing female of N. geniculata Mg. from female of N. aenea Mg.). Surstyli elongated-oval. Body length 4.0 to 5.0 mm.

== Distribution ==
Scandinavia South to central France. Ireland East through Central Europe, European Russia to Siberia.

== Habitat ==
Wetlands- acid fen, calcareous fen aapamire and raised bog.

== Biology ==
Flies low among vegetation in May to September Flowers visited include white umbellifers, Alisma plantago-aquatica, Baldellia ranunculoides, Caltha palustris, Potentilla erecta, Ranunculus.
