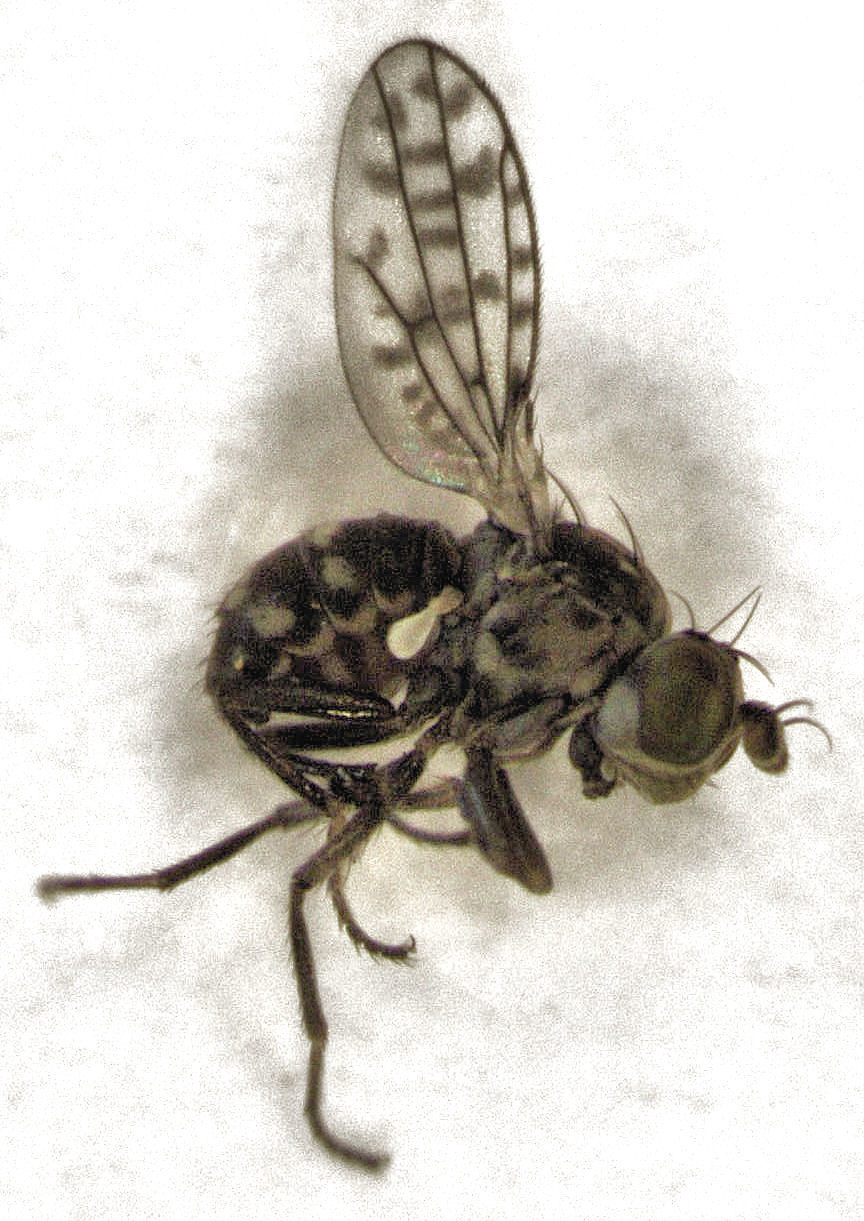
- Nostima duoseta

Scientific classification
- Kingdom: Animalia
- Phylum: Arthropoda
- Class: Insecta
- Order: Diptera
- Family: Ephydridae
- Subfamily: Ilytheinae
- Tribe: Hyadinini
- Genus: Nostima
- Species: N. duoseta

Binomial name
- Nostima duoseta Cresson, 1943

= Nostima duoseta =

Species of fly

Nostima duoseta is a species of shore fly.

== Description ==
As shown in the page image, N. duoseta has patterns on the body and wings. These patterns are present in most species of Nostima. The species can be distinguished from all other Nostima by the aristae of the antennae not being pectinate (not having long branches).

== Distribution ==
Australia, New Zealand.
