= Sphegina uncinata =

Scientific classification
- Kingdom: Animalia
- Phylum: Arthropoda
- Clade: Pancrustacea
- Class: Insecta
- Order: Diptera
- Family: Syrphidae
- Subfamily: Eristalinae
- Tribe: Brachyopini
- Subtribe: Spheginina
- Genus: Sphegina
- Species: S. uncinata

Binomial name
- Sphegina uncinata Hippa, Steenis & Mutin, 2015

Species of fly

Sphegina uncinata is a species of hoverfly in the family Syrphidae found in Myanmar. It's easily identified by a straight dorsal line of frontal prominence that ends just before the ocellar triangle, a strongly projecting mouth edge, and a vibrissal angle more strongly protruding than the frontal prominence.

== Etymology ==
The name comes from Latin 'uncinata', meaning 'hooked', referring to the hooked posterior part of the male superior lobe.

== Description ==
In male specimens, the body length is 4.5 to 5.8 millimeters and the wing length is 4.7 to 5.5 millimeters. The face is strongly concave with a large frontal prominence. The face is dorsally blackish, ventrally paler yellowish or brownish; gena yellow; lunula brown or yellow; occiput dull black; antenna brown, scape and pedicel usually not darker than the basal flagellomere; Colour dark brown, postpronotum and postalar callus yellow or brownish; pro- and mesoleg yellow; metaleg has a brown coxa, simple yellow trochanter, dark brown tarsus, brownish femur with basal 1/3 to basal 1/2 yellow, and a brown tibia with a yellowish annulus medially and no apico-ventral tooth-like projections. The wings are hyaline or more or less entirely darkened, with yellow stigma. The basal flagellomere is large and oval, the arista short and pilose. Female specimens are much the same except for normal sexual dimorphism; the body length is 5.5 to 6.2 millimeters, wing length is 5.8 to 6.5 millimeters, and the gena are more or less brownish.

== Related Species ==
S. uncinata is very similar to S. kumaoniensis and it's difficult to tell the two apart without reference to the male genitalia, in which they can be distinguished by S. uncinata's simple part of the baso-dorsal superior lobe (in S. kumaoniensis there is a horn-like process), narrow and dorsally curved apical part of the superior lobe (in S. kumaoniensis it's broad and curved latero-ventrally), and short, evenly broad from dorsal view surstylus with a straight medial margin (in S. kumaoniensis it's narrowed on the apical half with a concave medial margin). S. uncinata and S. kumaoniensis both differ from other species in their genus by their dark pollinose brownish colour and their short, narrow abdomens.
