= Nostima =

- Nostima picta

Scientific classification
- Kingdom: Animalia
- Phylum: Arthropoda
- Class: Insecta
- Order: Diptera
- Family: Ephydridae
- Subfamily: Ilytheinae
- Tribe: Hyadinini
- Genus: Nostima; Coquillett, 1900

Type species
- Nostima slossonae Coquillett, 1900

Genus of flies

Nostima is a genus of shore flies in the family Ephydridae.

== Description ==
Nostima are small flies with body lengths ranging from 0.72 to 1.72 mm. They often have patterns of microtomentum (fine hairs) on the body as well as patterns on the wings. The genus can be distinguished from related genera by a lack of acrostichal setae (Garifuna has 2 rows of these setae and Philygria has 1 row) and a lack of presutural dorsocentral setae (present in Philygria).

== Ecology ==
Larva of this genus are semiaquatic and feed on blue-green algae, while the adults usually occur in grassy habitats.

== Species ==
- N. approximata Sturtevant and Wheeler, 1954
- N. duoseta Cresson, 1943
- N. gilvipes (Coquillett, 1900)
- N. negramaculata Edmiston & Mathis, 2007
- N. niveivenosa Cresson, 1930
- N. occidentalis Sturtevant & Wheeler, 1954
- N. picta (Fallén, 1913)
- N. pulchra (Williston, 1896)
- N. quinquenotata Cresson, 1930
- N. scutellaris Cresson, 1933
- N. slossonae Coquillett, 1900
