= Sphegina adusta =

Scientific classification
- Kingdom: Animalia
- Phylum: Arthropoda
- Clade: Pancrustacea
- Class: Insecta
- Order: Diptera
- Family: Syrphidae
- Genus: Sphegina
- Species: S. adusta

Binomial name
- Sphegina adusta Hippa, Steenis & Mutin, 2015

Species of fly

Sphegina (Asiosphegina) adusta is a species of hoverfly in the family Syrphidae found in Myanmar. It's easily identified by its large size, left side surstylus with a number of unusual lobes, and general dark-brown coloration. It's similar to S. atricolor and S. furva, but unlike these species it lacks a transverse crest at the base of the lobe located sinistrolaterally at the posterior margin of male sternite IV.

== Etymology ==
The name comes from Latin 'adusta', meaning 'tanned' or 'brown', referring to its almost entirely dark-brown coloration.

== Description ==
In male specimens, body length is 8.3 millimeters and wing length is 6.3 millimeters. The face is strongly concave, moderately projected antero-ventrally, with a weakly developed frontal prominence. The face is blackish brown, medially slightly paler brown; gena brown; occiput black; antenna blackish; thorax blackish brown; scutellum shiny dark brown, the margin slightly paler brown; pro- and mesolegs brown; terga III and IV brownish black. The wings are slightly brownish with brown stigma. The basal flagellomere is as long as it is broad and semi-quadrangular; the arista is covered in soft hairs. The surstylus is strongly asymmetrical and the superior lobes are symmetrical; the left side surstylus has a number of unusual lobes. Female specimens are much the same except for normal sexual dimorphism; body length is 8.6 millimeters and wing length is 7.7 millimeters. Tergite II is predominantly dark-orange and tergite I has an oblique row of four yellow setae.
