= Neoascia distincta =

Scientific classification
- Kingdom: Animalia
- Phylum: Arthropoda
- Class: Insecta
- Order: Diptera
- Family: Syrphidae
- Subfamily: Eristalinae
- Tribe: Brachyopini
- Subtribe: Spheginina
- Genus: Neoascia
- Species: N. distincta

Binomial name
- Neoascia distincta (Williston, 1882)

Synonyms
- Ascia metallica Williston, 1882; Ascia nasuta Bigot, 1883; Ascia quadrinotata Bigot, 1883; Neoascia minuta Curran, 1925

Species of fly

Neoascia distincta is a species of hoverfly in the family Syrphidae.

== Distribution ==
Canada, United States.
