= Sphegina crucivena =

Scientific classification
- Kingdom: Animalia
- Phylum: Arthropoda
- Clade: Pancrustacea
- Class: Insecta
- Order: Diptera
- Family: Syrphidae
- Genus: Sphegina
- Subgenus: Asiosphegina
- Species: S. crucivena

Binomial name
- Sphegina crucivena Hippa, Steenis & Mutin, 2015

Species of fly

Sphegina crucivena is a species of hoverfly in the family Syrphidae found in Kambaiti Pass, Myanmar, a montane forest with swampy areas and streams located 2000 meters above sea level.

== Etymology ==
The name comes from the Latin words 'crux', meaning 'cross', and 'vena', meaning 'vein', referring to the unusual cross vein between R1 and R2+3.

== Description ==
In male specimens, the wings are 7.3 millimeters long (4.5 to 6.1 in females), hyaline, infuscated along the transversal veins with yellow stigma. The thorax is dull dark brownish to black, postpronotum and postalar callus dark yellow; pleura dark orange-brown; scutellum brownish, semicircular, and shiny. The pro- and mesolegs are yellow, tarsomeres 4 and 5 brownish; metaleg with coxa brownish, trochanter simple, brownish; metafemur yellow with a broad ventrally interrupted diffuse brown annulus medially; metatibia without apicoventral tooth, brown, the basal 1/4 and an annulus on the apical 1/2 yellow; metatarsus black. The surstyli and superior lobes are symmetrical, aedeagal lobe curved and very long, the postero-dorsal part of the aedeagus long and curved as well.

Females are similar to males except for normal sexual dimorphism. Body length is 4.8 to 6.0 millimeters. The face is ventrally yellow and rather shiny, dorsally black; strongly concave, moderately projected antero-ventrally, with a well developed frontal prominence. The gena is shiny yellow; frons and vertex shiny dark brown; occiput shiny black; antenna brownish-yellow with the basal flagellomere elongated and the arista short and pilose.

== Related species ==
S. crucivena is very similar to S. forficata, though they differ by the dorsal margin of the surstylus (bowed in the middle in S. crucivena, evenly curved from base to apex in S. forficata), superior lobe (large and as long as sternite IX in S. crucivena, small and one-fourth the length of sternite IX in S. forficata), and apex of the ejaculatory hood (simple in S. crucivena, posterior part with tooth-like subapical lobe S. forficata). Male sternite IV is also slightly different; in S. crucivena the pile medially at posterior margin is stronger than in the other parts while in S. forficata the pile is similar throughout.
