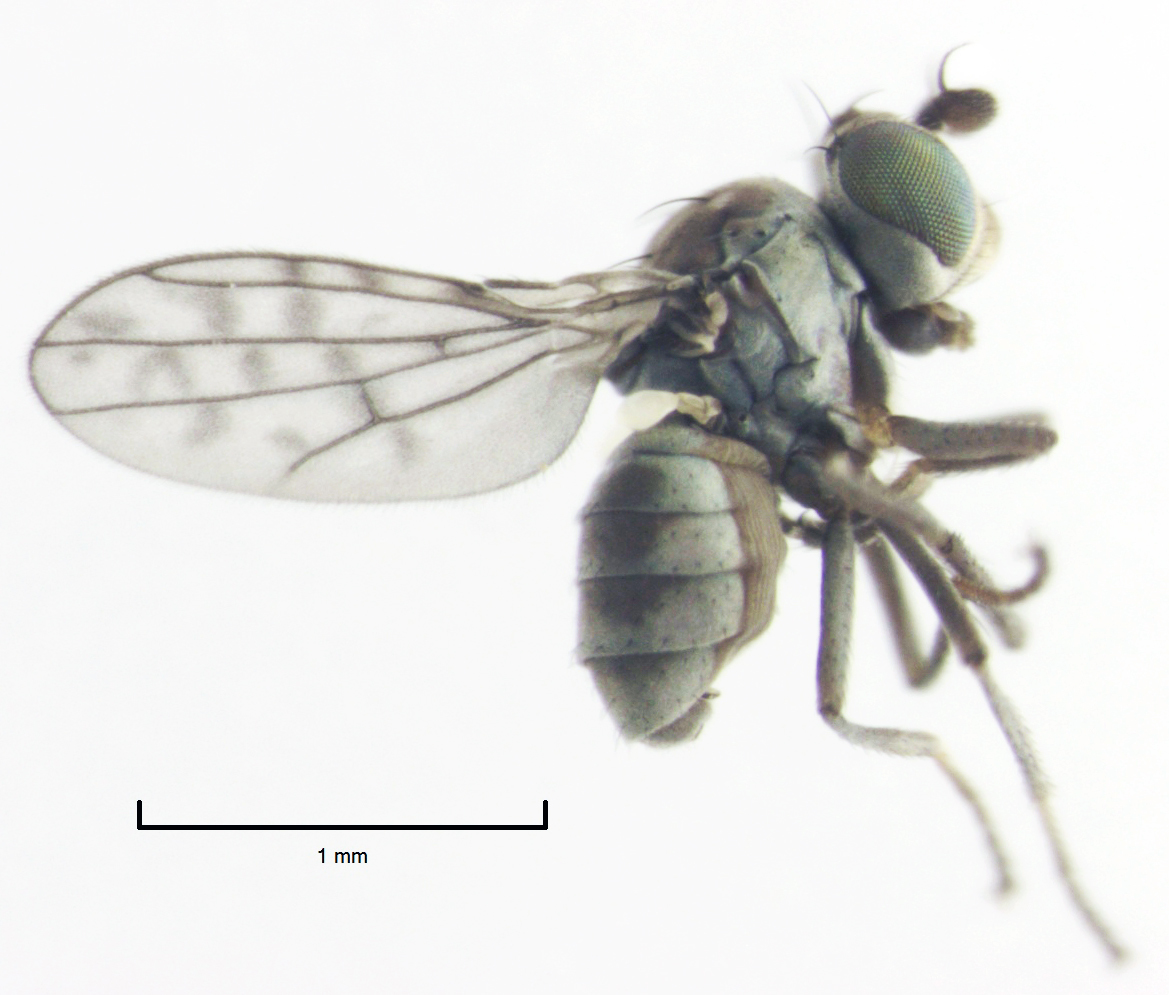
- Nostima negramaculata

Scientific classification
- Kingdom: Animalia
- Phylum: Arthropoda
- Class: Insecta
- Order: Diptera
- Family: Ephydridae
- Subfamily: Ilytheinae
- Tribe: Hyadinini
- Genus: Nostima
- Species: N. negramaculata

Binomial name
- Nostima negramaculata Edmiston & Mathis, 2007

= Nostima negramaculata =

Species of fly

Nostima negramaculata is a species of shore flies. It is found in New Zealand.
