= Neoascia subannexa =

Scientific classification
- Kingdom: Animalia
- Phylum: Arthropoda
- Class: Insecta
- Order: Diptera
- Family: Syrphidae
- Subfamily: Eristalinae
- Tribe: Brachyopini
- Subtribe: Spheginina
- Genus: Neoascia
- Species: N. subannexa

Binomial name
- Neoascia subannexa Claussen & Hayat, 1997

Species of fly

Neoascia subannexa is a species of hoverfly in the family Syrphidae.

== Distribution ==
Turkey.
