= Garifuna (disambiguation) =

The Garifuna are an ethnic group of the Americas comprising descendants of Island Carib, Arawak, and West African peoples.

Garifuna may also refer to:

- Garifuna language, an Arawakan language spoken by the Garifuna
- Garifuna Americans, American citizens or resident aliens of Garifuna descent
- Garifuna music
- Garifuna Settlement Day
- Garifuna, a genus of flies
