= Nostima niveivenosa =

Scientific classification
- Kingdom: Animalia
- Phylum: Arthropoda
- Class: Insecta
- Order: Diptera
- Family: Ephydridae
- Subfamily: Ilytheinae
- Tribe: Hyadinini
- Genus: Nostima
- Species: N. niveivenosa

Binomial name
- Nostima niveivenosa Cresson, 1930

Species of fly

Nostima niveivenosa is a species of shore flies in the family Ephydridae.

== Distribution ==
United States, Neotropics.
