= Neoascia tuberculifera =

Scientific classification
- Kingdom: Animalia
- Phylum: Arthropoda
- Class: Insecta
- Order: Diptera
- Family: Syrphidae
- Subfamily: Eristalinae
- Tribe: Brachyopini
- Subtribe: Spheginina
- Genus: Neoascia
- Species: N. tuberculifera

Binomial name
- Neoascia tuberculifera Violovich, 1957

Species of fly

Neoascia tuberculifera is a species of hoverfly in the family Syrphidae.

== Distribution ==
Russia.
