= Nostima picta =

Scientific classification
- Kingdom: Animalia
- Phylum: Arthropoda
- Class: Insecta
- Order: Diptera
- Family: Ephydridae
- Subfamily: Ilytheinae
- Tribe: Hyadinini
- Genus: Nostima
- Species: N. picta

Binomial name
- Nostima picta (Fallén, 1913)

Synonyms
- Notiphila picta Fallén, 1813; Notiphila pullula Fallén, 1823

Species of fly

Nostima picta is a species of shore flies in the family Ephydridae.

== Distribution ==
Europe, Canada, United States.
