= Sphegina bispinosa =

Scientific classification
- Kingdom: Animalia
- Phylum: Arthropoda
- Clade: Pancrustacea
- Class: Insecta
- Order: Diptera
- Family: Syrphidae
- Genus: Sphegina
- Species: S. bispinosa

Binomial name
- Sphegina bispinosa Brunetti, 1915

Species of fly

Sphegina (Asiosphegina) bispinosa is a species of hoverfly in the family Syrphidae found in India, Nepal, and Bhutan. It's similar to S. (A.) hansoni, but easily differentiated by the strongly asymmetrical surstyli.

== Description ==
In male specimens, the body length is 7.9 to 9.8 millimeters and wing length is 5.8 to 7.7 millimeters. The face is dull black and concave with a weakly developed frontal prominence and long pilose along eye-margin. The gena and mouth edge are black, with a large subtriangular non-pollinose shiny area; frons and vertex black, a subtriangular area posterior of the lunula non-pollinose and shiny; occiput black with light yellow pilose; antenna dark brown with black setae dorsally on scape and pedicel; thorax dark brown to black, scutellum black, sub-rectangular, and pollinose; pro- and mesoleg brown to brown-yellow, tarsomeres 4–5 dark brown to black; metaleg dark brown to black, dark yellow on extreme base of femur and tibia; femur slightly incrassate, basal tarsomere thin. The wing is entirely microtrichose, hyaline, with yellowish stigma and brown membrane infuscated along veins dm-cu and M1. The basal flagellomere is oval, the arista short and pilose, about 3.5 to 4 times as long as the basal flagellomere.

A female specimen of S. (A.) bispinosa was found to be conspecifc with female specimens of S. (A.) carinata. Female specimens are much the same except for normal sexual dimorphism; body length is 7.8 to 9.2 millimeters and wing length is 6.1 to 7.0 millimeters. The basal flagellomere is round to slightly oval, the arista short and pilose, about three times as long as the basal flagellomere.
