= Neoascia interrupta =

Scientific classification
- Kingdom: Animalia
- Phylum: Arthropoda
- Class: Insecta
- Order: Diptera
- Family: Syrphidae
- Subfamily: Eristalinae
- Tribe: Brachyopini
- Subtribe: Spheginina
- Genus: Neoascia
- Species: N. interrupta

Binomial name
- Neoascia interrupta (Meigen, 1822)

Synonyms
- Ascia interrupta Meigen, 1822

Species of fly

Neoascia interrupta is a species of hoverfly in the family Syrphidae. It is found in France.
