= Neoascia globosa =

Scientific classification
- Kingdom: Animalia
- Phylum: Arthropoda
- Class: Insecta
- Order: Diptera
- Family: Syrphidae
- Subfamily: Eristalinae
- Tribe: Brachyopini
- Subtribe: Spheginina
- Genus: Neoascia
- Species: N. globosa

Binomial name
- Neoascia globosa (Walker, 1849)

Synonyms
- Neoascia distincta Williston, 1887; Ascia globosa Walker, 1849

Species of fly

Neoascia globosa (Walker 1849), the Black-margined Fen , is a fairly common species of syrphid fly observed in northeastern North America. Hoverflies can remain nearly motionless in flight. The adults are also known as flower flies, for they are commonly found on flowers from which they get both energy-giving nectar and protein-rich pollen. The larvae are aquatic.

== Description ==
For terminology see Speight key to genera and glossary

Length, 3.3–5 mm (0.13–0.20 in).

The head has blackish antennae, with the third joint being red on the lower part and brownish on the upper border. The front of the head is finely roughened, while the face appears whitish with a pollinose texture. In males, the eyes touch each other, a condition known as holoptic

The thorax is lightly roughened with a metallic greenish bronze color, which gives it a moderate shine.

The abdomen is lightly punctate and moderately shining. It is predominantly black, although the third segment may have two small spots. The abdomen appears slightly narrowed at the posterior of segment one and the anterior of segment two. Segment two is twice as long as it is wide.

The wings are nearly transparent, with a dilute yellow stigma. The vein M joins the vein R_{4+5} at approximately a right angle. The crossvein r-m is located at the basal quarter of the discal cell. The posterior angle of the discal cell is almost a right angle.

The legs have the black femora, except for the base and tip are yellowish. The hind tibiae are black with yellow base and tips. The front and mid-tarsi are yellow, while the first and last two joints of the hind tarsi are black.

== Distribution ==
Canada, United States.
