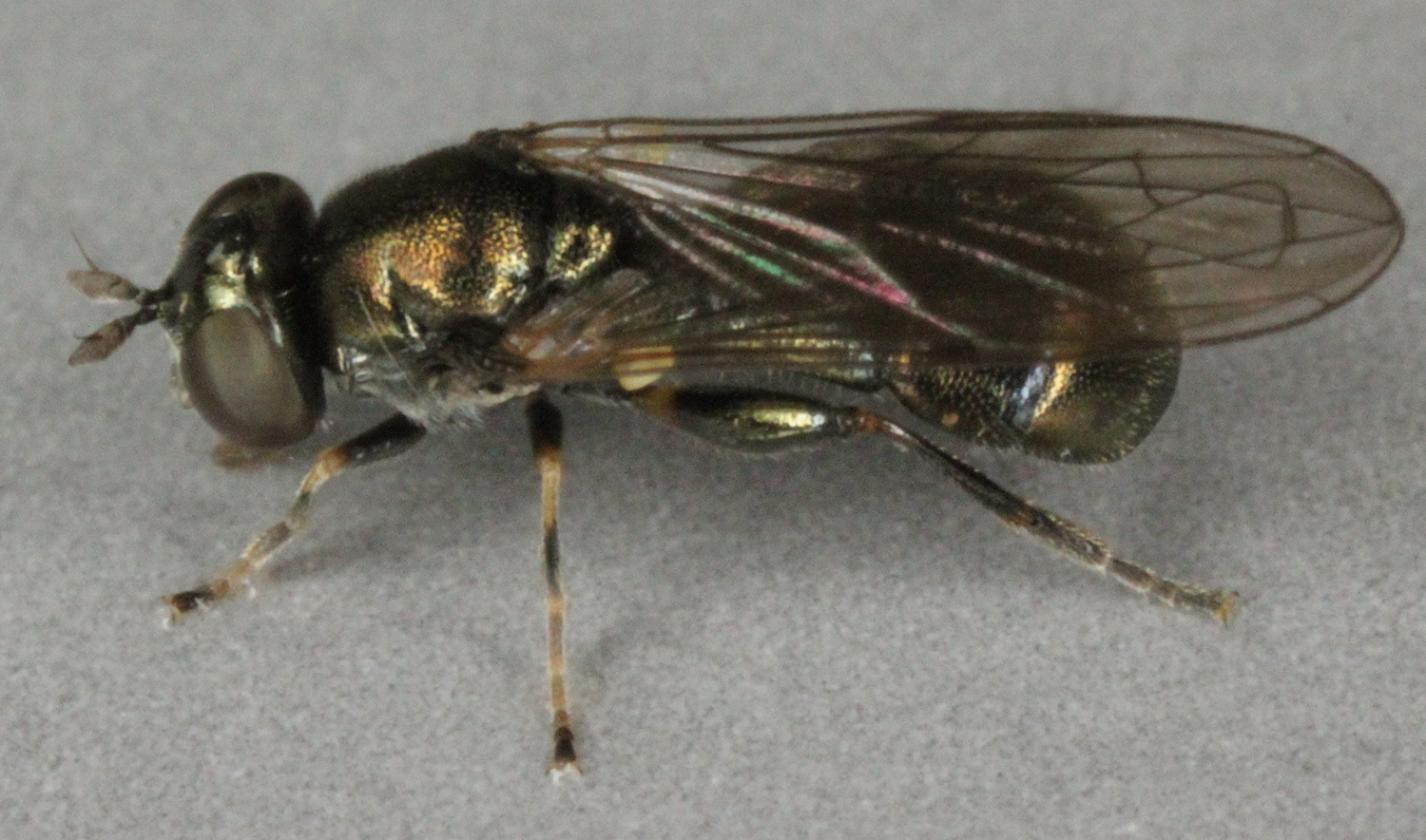
- Neoascia tenur Trawscoed, North Wales

Scientific classification
- Kingdom: Animalia
- Phylum: Arthropoda
- Class: Insecta
- Order: Diptera
- Family: Syrphidae
- Subfamily: Eristalinae
- Tribe: Brachyopini
- Subtribe: Spheginina
- Genus: Neoascia
- Species: N. tenur

Binomial name
- Neoascia tenur (Harris 1780)

Synonyms
- Musca tenur Harris, 1780; Ascia quadripunctata Meigen, 1822; Ascia dispar Meigen, 1822; Neoascia floralis ssp. lapponica Kanervo, 1934; Neoascia floralis ssp. splendida Kanervo, 1934; Scaeva quadriguttata Gravenhorst, 1807; Ascia bifasciata Zetterstedt, 1838

= Neoascia tenur =

Species of fly

Neoascia tenur is a Palearctic species of hoverfly.

== Description ==
For terms, see Morphology of Diptera
Wing length 3-5 ·25 mm. Tibiae 1 yellow with the dark ring. Metatarsae 1 yellow with the dark patch, other segments of tarsi 1 yellowish. Females: abdomen not as broad as N. meticulosa. The male genitalia are figured by Barkemeyer & Claussen (1986) Larvae and puparia described and figured by Maibach and Goeldlin (1993) . See references for determination.

The male genitalia are illustrated by Barkemeyer and Claussen (1986)

== Distribution ==
Palearctic Fennoscandia South to Iberia and the Mediterranean basin. Ireland east through Europe into Turkey and to European parts of Russia and on to Siberia.

== Biology ==
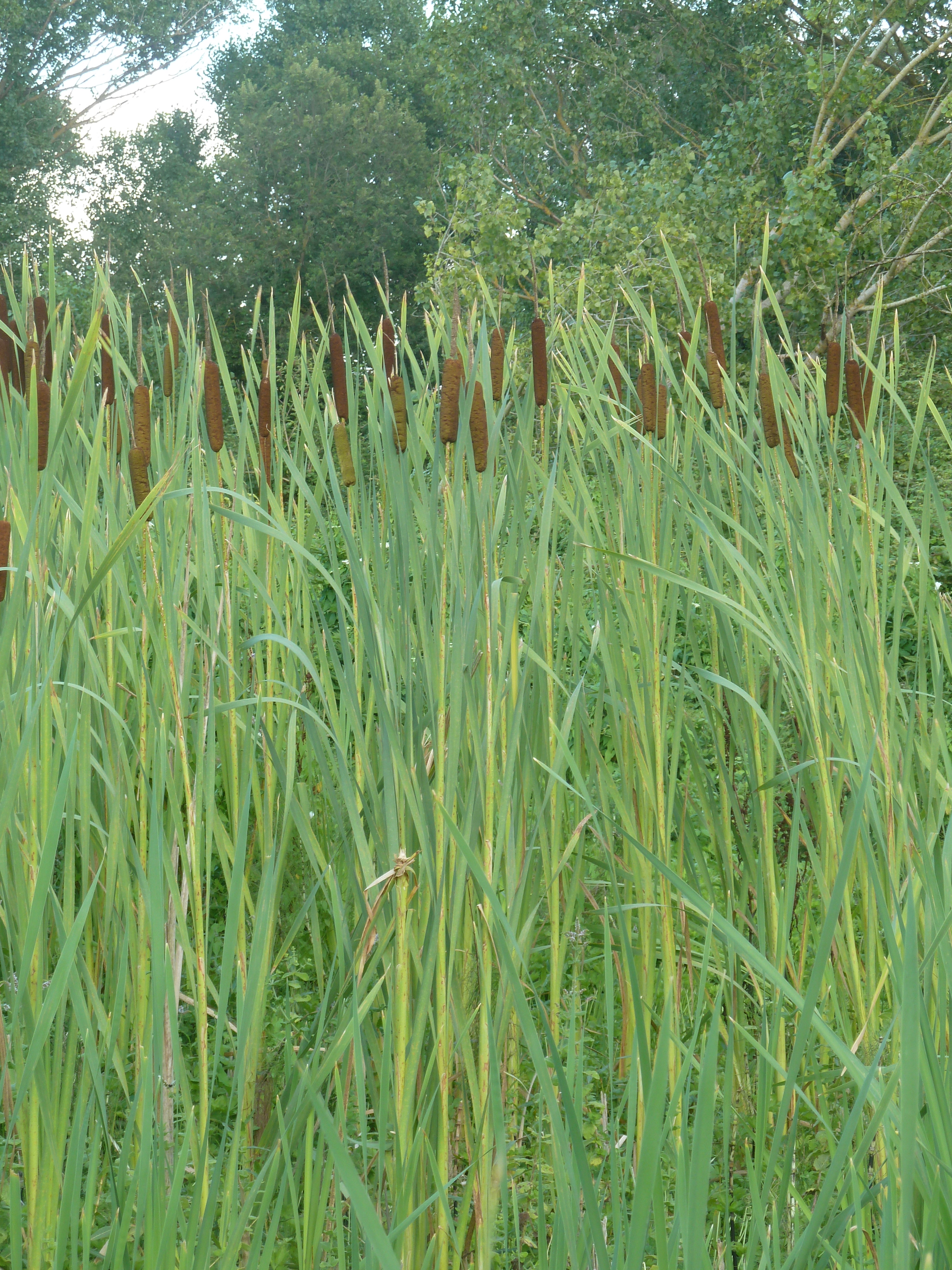
Habitat.Italy.

Habitat: Wetlands, flushes and streams in blanket bog, raised bogs, fen, wet grassland, pond and lake margins and along brooks. Flowers visited include Caltha, Cicuta virosa, Filipendula ulmaria, Potentilla erecta, Ranunculus, Salix repens. The flight period is April to September. The larva is sub-aquatic within stem sheaths of Typha and other water plants.
