= Neoascia nana =

Scientific classification
- Kingdom: Animalia
- Phylum: Arthropoda
- Class: Insecta
- Order: Diptera
- Family: Syrphidae
- Subfamily: Eristalinae
- Tribe: Brachyopini
- Subtribe: Spheginina
- Genus: Neoascia
- Species: N. nana

Binomial name
- Neoascia nana Reemer & Hippa, 2005

Species of fly

Neoascia nana is a species of hoverfly in the family Syrphidae.

== Distribution ==
Neoascia nana is found within Myanmar.
