= Sphegina kumaoniensis =

Scientific classification
- Kingdom: Animalia
- Phylum: Arthropoda
- Clade: Pancrustacea
- Class: Insecta
- Order: Diptera
- Family: Syrphidae
- Subfamily: Eristalinae
- Tribe: Brachyopini
- Subtribe: Spheginina
- Genus: Sphegina
- Species: S. kumaoniensis

Binomial name
- Sphegina kumaoniensis Mutin, 1998

Species of fly

Sphegina kumaoniensis is a species of hoverfly in the family Syrphidae found in India, Thailand, and northeast Myanmar. It's characterized by a convex dorsal line of frontal prominence that ends clearly before the ocellar triangle as well as a mouthedge less strongly projecting, vibrissal angle less protruding or equal with the frontal prominence.

== Etymology ==
The name comes the Kumaon division where it was originally discovered.

== Related Species ==
S. kumaoniensis is very similar to S. uncinata and it's difficult to tell the two apart without reference to the male genitalia, in which they can be distinguished by S. kumaoniensis' horn-like process of the baso-dorsal superior lobe (absent in S. uncinata), broad and latero-ventrally curved apical part of the superior lobe (in S. uncinata it's narrow and dorsally curved), and surstylus narrowed on the apical half with a concave medial margin (in S. uncinata it's short and evenly broad from dorsal view). S. kumaoniensis and S. uncinata both differ from other species in their genus by their dark pollinose brownish colour and their short, narrow abdomens.
