= Sphegina atricolor =

Scientific classification
- Kingdom: Animalia
- Phylum: Arthropoda
- Clade: Pancrustacea
- Class: Insecta
- Order: Diptera
- Family: Syrphidae
- Genus: Sphegina
- Species: S. atricolor

Binomial name
- Sphegina atricolor Steenis, Hippa & Mutin, 2015

Species of fly

Sphegina (Asiosphegina) atricolor is a species of hoverfly in the family Syrphidae found in Myanmar.

== Etymology ==
The name comes from Latin 'atricolor', meaning 'black', referring to the general dark color of the fly.

== Description ==
In male specimens, body length is 6.2 to 7.5 millimeters and wing length is 5.2 to 6.5 millimeters. The face is strongly concave with a weakly developed frontal prominence. The face is black; gena shiny brown or yellow; lunula shiny brown; occiput dull black; antenna dark brown; proleg and trochanter yellow; profemur mainly brownish, base and apex yellow; protibia yellowish, usually brownish medially; protarsus yellow, tarsomeres 4 and 5 black; mesoleg with coxa and trochanter yellow; mesofemur brown, basal 1/5 and apical 1/6 yellowish; mesotibia yellow, more or less developed brownish annulus on apical 1/2; mesotarsus yellow, tarsomeres 4 and 5 black; metaleg with coxa brown, trochanter yellow, simple; metafemur blackish, extreme base yellow; metatibia yellow, without apico-ventral tooth, apical 1/5 dark brown and an obscure dark annulus medially; metatarsus dark brown. The surstyli are strongly asymmetrical with only slightly asymmetrical superior lobes; part of the postero-ventral sternite IX is strongly asymmetrical; tergite IX is elongated and the cercus is narrow. The basal flagellomere is oval and the scutellum is semicircular and dorsally semi-shiny. No female specimens are known.

== Related Species ==
S. (A.) atricolor is similar to S. (A.) furva, though it can be differentiated by tergite IX (shorter in S. (A.) atricolor than S. (A.) furva), the dorsal lobe of right side surstylus (shorter than the medial lobe in S. (A.) atricolor and much longer than the medial lobe in S. (A.) furva), and the two lobes at the dorsal margin on the left side surstylus (much lower in S. (A.) atricolor than in S. (A.) furva. Both species are also similar to S. (A.) adusta, but unlike this species they possess a transverse crest at the base of the lobe located sinistrolaterally at the posterior margin of male sternite IV. S. (A.) atricolor and S. (A.) furva resemble a number of Oriental and eastern Palearctic Sphegina species due to the large subtriangular lobe posteriorly on the left side of male sternite IV.
