= Aristae =

Aristae is the plural form of arista. It may refer to:

- Arista (insect anatomy), part of an insect antenna
- Arista (botany), an awn
