= Hyadina albovenosa =

Scientific classification
- Kingdom: Animalia
- Phylum: Arthropoda
- Class: Insecta
- Order: Diptera
- Family: Ephydridae
- Subfamily: Ilytheinae
- Tribe: Ilytheini
- Genus: Hyadina
- Species: H. albovenosa

Binomial name
- Hyadina albovenosa Coquillett, 1900

Species of fly

Hyadina albovenosa is a species of shore flies in the family Ephydridae.

== Distribution ==
Canada, United States, Mexico, El Salvador.
