= Chamaesphegina argentifacies =

Scientific classification
- Kingdom: Animalia
- Phylum: Arthropoda
- Class: Insecta
- Order: Diptera
- Family: Syrphidae
- Subfamily: Eristalinae
- Tribe: Brachyopini
- Subtribe: Spheginina
- Genus: Chamaesphegina
- Species: C. argentifacies

Binomial name
- Chamaesphegina argentifacies Shannon & Aubertin, 1933

Species of fly

Chamaesphegina argentifacies is a species of Hoverfly in the family Syrphidae.

== Distribution ==
Argentina, Chile.
