= Sphegina culex =

Scientific classification
- Kingdom: Animalia
- Phylum: Arthropoda
- Clade: Pancrustacea
- Class: Insecta
- Order: Diptera
- Family: Syrphidae
- Genus: Sphegina
- Subgenus: Asiosphegina
- Species: S. culex

Binomial name
- Sphegina culex Hippa, Steenis & Mutin, 2015

Species of fly

Sphegina culex is a species of hoverfly in the family Syrphidae found in Kambaiti Pass, Myanmar, a montane forest with swampy areas and streams located 2000 meters above sea level.

== Etymology ==
The name comes from Latin 'culex', meaning 'mosquito', referring to the mosquito-like appearance of the fly.

== Description ==
Like other species in its genus, S. culex is small and slender, though unlike them it bears a mosquito-like appearance. In male specimens, the body length is 4.6–4.9 millimeters. The wings are 4.4–4.8 millimeters long, hyaline, with very pale stigma. The face is strongly concave with a weakly developed frontal prominence. The face and gena are dark; frons and vertex black and semi-shiny; lunula shiny brown; occiput dull black; antenna dark brown, basal flagellomere baso-ventrally reddish; thorax black; pro- and mesoleg yellow, tarsomeres 4 and 5 black; metaleg with coxa brownish, trochanter yellow; metafemur blackish, basal 1/3 yellow; metatibia without apico-ventral tooth, colour yellow, the apical 1/4 black and an obscure brownish annulus on the basal 1/2; tarsus black. No female specimens are known.

== Related Species ==
S. culex is similar to S. pollex, though it differs by having a large (instead of small) membranous incision at the posterior margin of male sternite IV, and by lacking a thumb-like subbasal sublobe located dorso-medially on the dorsal lobe of the surstylus. Both species have superior lobes similar to S. achaeta's, but the postero-dorsal lobe-like part is rounded (acute in S. achaeta).
