= Neoascia unifasciata =

Scientific classification
- Kingdom: Animalia
- Phylum: Arthropoda
- Class: Insecta
- Order: Diptera
- Family: Syrphidae
- Subfamily: Eristalinae
- Tribe: Brachyopini
- Subtribe: Spheginina
- Genus: Neoascia
- Species: N. unifasciata

Binomial name
- Neoascia unifasciata (Strobl, 1898)

Synonyms
- Ascia podagrica var. unifasciata Strobl, 1898

Species of fly

Neoascia unifasciata is a species of hoverfly in the family Syrphidae.

== Distribution ==
Austria.
