= Sphegina bifida =

Scientific classification
- Kingdom: Animalia
- Phylum: Arthropoda
- Clade: Pancrustacea
- Class: Insecta
- Order: Diptera
- Family: Syrphidae
- Genus: Sphegina
- Species: S. bifida

Binomial name
- Sphegina bifida Hippa, Steenis & Mutin, 2018

Species of fly

Sphegina (Asiosphegina) bifida is a species of hoverfly in the family Syrphidae found in Malaysia. It's similar to S. (A.) inventum, though it's differentiated by having the male superior lobe on both sides longer than wide instead of wider than long.

== Etymology ==
The name comes from Latin ‘bifida’, meaning ‘split into two parts’, referring to the bifid lobe posteriorly on male sternum IV.

== Description ==
In male specimens, body length is 5.8 millimeters. The face is black and concave with a very weakly developed frontal prominence and long pilose along eye-margin. The gena and mouth edge are black, gena with large subtriangular non-pollinose shiny area; frons and vertex black, slightly pollinose with a circular area posterior of the lunula non-pollinose and shiny; occiput black with light yellow pilose; antenna black with black setae dorsally on the scape and pedicel; thorax dark brown to black; scutellum black, sub-rectangular, sub-shiny, and weakly pollinose; pro- and mesoleg yellow, tarsomeres 4 and 5 black; metaleg with coxa and trochanter black; femur black with basal 1/5 yellow, slightly incrassate; tibia yellow with apical ⅓ black, widened apically, with subtriangular apicoventral dens; tarsus entirely black, basal tarsomere very thick. The wings are microtrichose, only sparsely microtrichose on the basal part of cell bm, almost bare; hyaline with yellowish stigma. Surstyli and superior lobes strongly asymmetrical. The basal flagellomere is round, the arista weakly short and pilose, about three times as long as the basal flagellomere. No female specimens are known.
