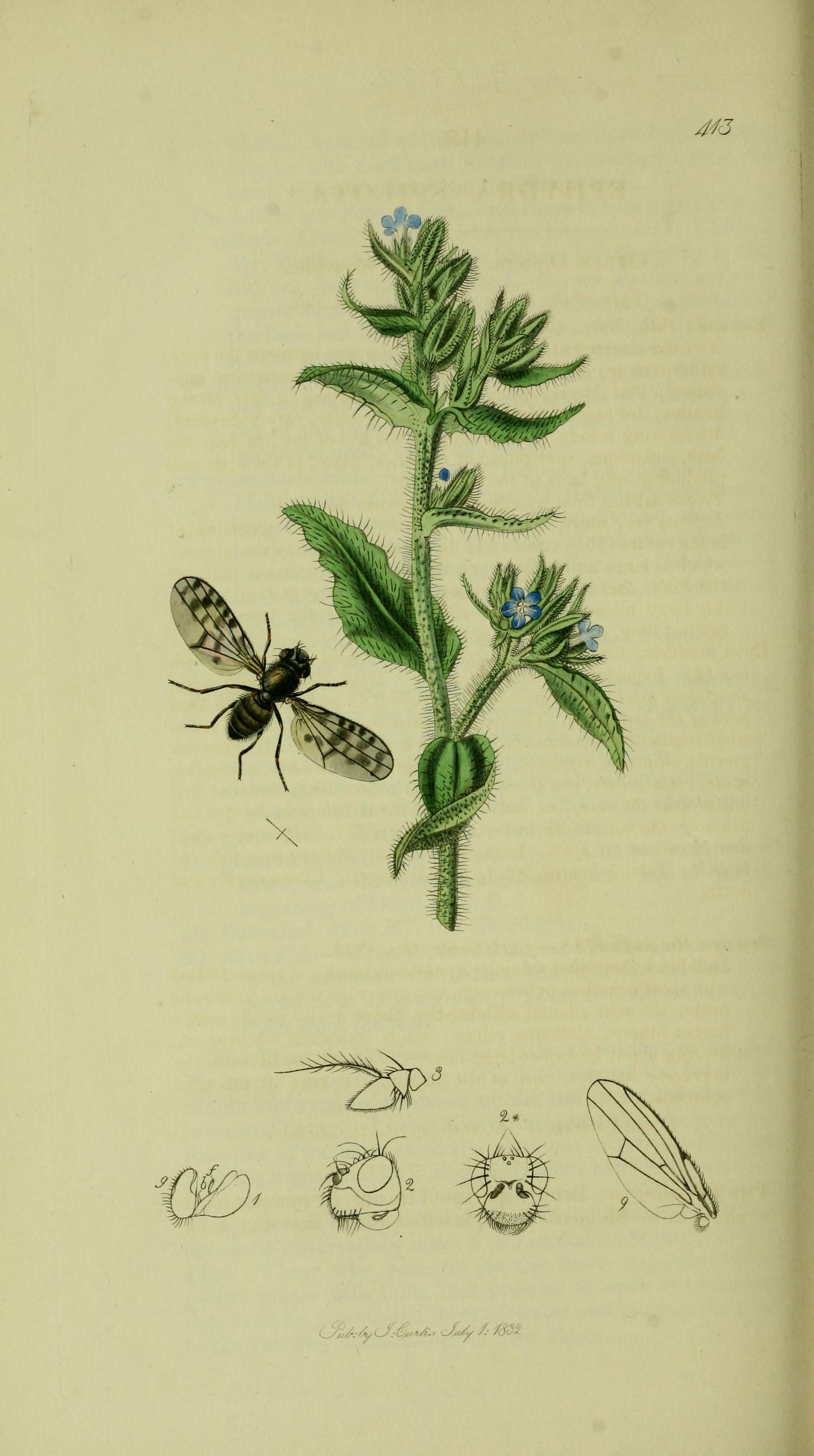

Scientific classification
- Kingdom: Animalia
- Phylum: Arthropoda
- Class: Insecta
- Order: Diptera
- Family: Ephydridae
- Subfamily: Ilytheinae
- Tribe: Ilytheini
- Genus: Ilythea
- Species: I. spilota

Binomial name
- Ilythea spilota (Curtis, 1832)

= Ilythea spilota =

Species of fly

Ilythea spilota is a species of 'shore flies' belonging to the family Ephydridae.

It is a Holarctic species with a limited distribution in Europe They are found along shorelines of small streams. The larvae consume pinnate diatoms. Newly hatched larvae form a protective case by fastening a mix of sand grains and detritus to their dorsal surfaces.

== Distribution ==
Canada, United States, Europe.
