= Sphegina crinita =

Scientific classification
- Kingdom: Animalia
- Phylum: Arthropoda
- Clade: Pancrustacea
- Class: Insecta
- Order: Diptera
- Family: Syrphidae
- Genus: Sphegina
- Subgenus: Asiosphegina
- Species: S. crinita

Binomial name
- Sphegina crinita Hippa, Steenis & Mutin, 2018

Species of fly

Sphegina crinita is a species of hoverfly in the family Syrphidae found in Malaysia and Indonesia. It's easily identified by its superior lobes, the left side one being pushed over the medial line of the hypandrium to the right side so that the right side one seems bilobed. Otherwise, the genitalia are nearly identical to those in S. fimbriata.

== Etymology ==
The name comes from Latin ‘crinita’, meaning ‘long-haired’, referring to the long setae on the male superior lobe.

== Description ==
Like other species in its genus, S. crinita is small, slender, and wasp-like. In male specimens, the body length is 6.4–6.9 millimeters (5.8–6.2 in females). The wings are 4.7–5.5 millimeters long (4.0–4.4 in females), hyaline, microtrichose (bare on baso-medial ¼ of cell and only weakly microtrichose on cell cup) with brownish stigma. The face is black, the ventral ⅓ to ½ yellow; concave with a very weakly developed frontal prominence and long pilose along the eye-margin. The gena is yellow to dark yellow; mouth edge dark brown to black with a large, subtriangular, non-pollinose shiny area; occiput black with light yellow pilose. Antenna with scape and pedicel dark brown with black setae dorsally; the basal flagellomere light-brown to yellow, oval to subrectangular; arista long and pilose, about three times as long as the basal flagellomere. Frons and vertex black, a subtriangular area posterior of the lunula non-pollinose and shiny. Thorax dark brown to black, postpronotum light yellow to brown-yellow; scutellum black, subrectangular, and shiny. The pro- and mesoleg are yellow with tarsomeres 3–5 black; metaleg with coxa black, trochanter yellow; femur black with basal ⅓ yellow, strongly incrassate; tibia black and yellow biannulate, with long and wide apicoventral dens; tarsus entirely black with a thick basal tarsomere. Females are similar to males except for normal sexual dimorphism.
