= Chamaesphegina macra =

Scientific classification
- Kingdom: Animalia
- Phylum: Arthropoda
- Class: Insecta
- Order: Diptera
- Family: Syrphidae
- Subfamily: Eristalinae
- Tribe: Brachyopini
- Subtribe: Spheginina
- Genus: Chamaesphegina
- Species: C. macra

Binomial name
- Chamaesphegina macra (Enderlein, 1938)

Synonyms
- Desmetrum macrum Enderlein, 1938

Species of fly

Chamaesphegina macra is a species of hoverfly in the family Syrphidae.

== Distribution ==
Chile.
