= Neoascia subchalybea =

Scientific classification
- Kingdom: Animalia
- Phylum: Arthropoda
- Class: Insecta
- Order: Diptera
- Family: Syrphidae
- Subfamily: Eristalinae
- Tribe: Brachyopini
- Subtribe: Spheginina
- Genus: Neoascia
- Species: N. subchalybea

Binomial name
- Neoascia subchalybea Curran, 1925

Synonyms
- Neoascia petsamoensis Kanervo, 1934

Species of fly

Neoascia subchalybea is a species of Hoverfly in the family Syrphidae.

== Distribution ==
Canada, United States.
