= Neoascia annexa =

Scientific classification
- Kingdom: Animalia
- Phylum: Arthropoda
- Class: Insecta
- Order: Diptera
- Family: Syrphidae
- Subfamily: Eristalinae
- Tribe: Brachyopini
- Subtribe: Spheginina
- Genus: Neoascia
- Species: N. annexa

Binomial name
- Neoascia annexa (Müller, 1776)

Synonyms
- Musca annexa Müller, 1776; Musca bifasciatus Schrank, 1776; Musca dizonias Gmelin, 1790

Species of fly

Neoascia annexa is a species of hoverfly in the family Syrphidae.

== Distribution ==
Denmark.
