= Neoascia guttata =

Scientific classification
- Kingdom: Animalia
- Phylum: Arthropoda
- Class: Insecta
- Order: Diptera
- Family: Syrphidae
- Subfamily: Eristalinae
- Tribe: Brachyopini
- Subtribe: Spheginina
- Genus: Neoascia
- Species: N. guttata

Binomial name
- Neoascia guttata Skevington & Moran, 2019

Species of fly

Neoascia guttata is a species of Hoverfly in the family Syrphidae.

== Distribution ==
Canada.
