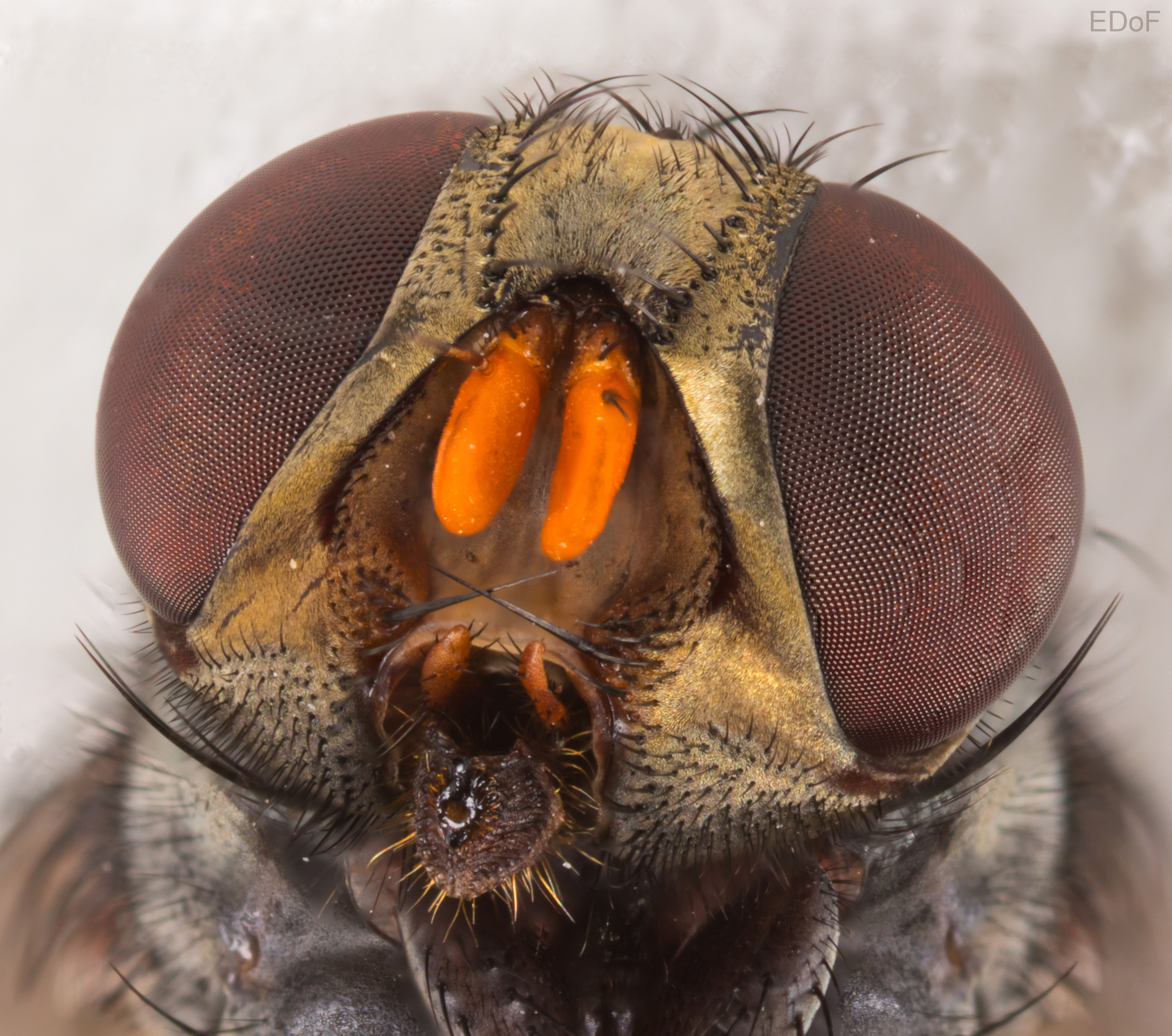

Scientific classification
- Kingdom: Animalia
- Phylum: Arthropoda
- Class: Insecta
- Order: Diptera
- Family: Muscidae
- Genus: Synthesiomyia
- Species: S. nudiseta

Binomial name
- Synthesiomyia nudiseta Van Der Wulp, 1883

Synonyms
- Cyrtoneura nudiseta Van Der Wulp, 1883; Hyadesimyia grisea Giglio-tos, 1893; Synthesiomyia brasiliana Brauer & von Bergenstamm, 1893

= Synthesiomyia nudiseta =

Species of fly

Synthesiomyia nudiseta is one of the largest flies in the family Muscidae. The fly has a pair of forewings; the paired hind wings have been reduced to halteres that help with stability and movement during flight. Key characteristics of this species include plumose (that is, "feathery") segmented aristae, well-developed calypters, and sternopleural bristles. Synthesiomyia nudiseta is a forensically important species because it is necrophagous and can therefore help determine the time of colonization for the post mortem interval with its known life cycle.

== Classification ==
The species Synthesiomyia nudiseta, was named by Frederik Maurits van der Wulp in 1883; and S. nudiseta is the only known species under the genus Synthesiomyia.

Synthesiomyia nudiseta is essentially a kind of necrophagous fly. Larvae of S. nudiseta were found in a cadaver in Costa Rica, and the larvae have also been shown to be important on decomposition of carcasses in Malaysia. S. nudiseta are said to be useful in the recognition of the range of post-death, and of importance to forensic entomology. In Brazil, S. nudiseta is very common in Rio de Janeiro, where it is highly synanthropic.

== Anatomy and defining characteristics ==
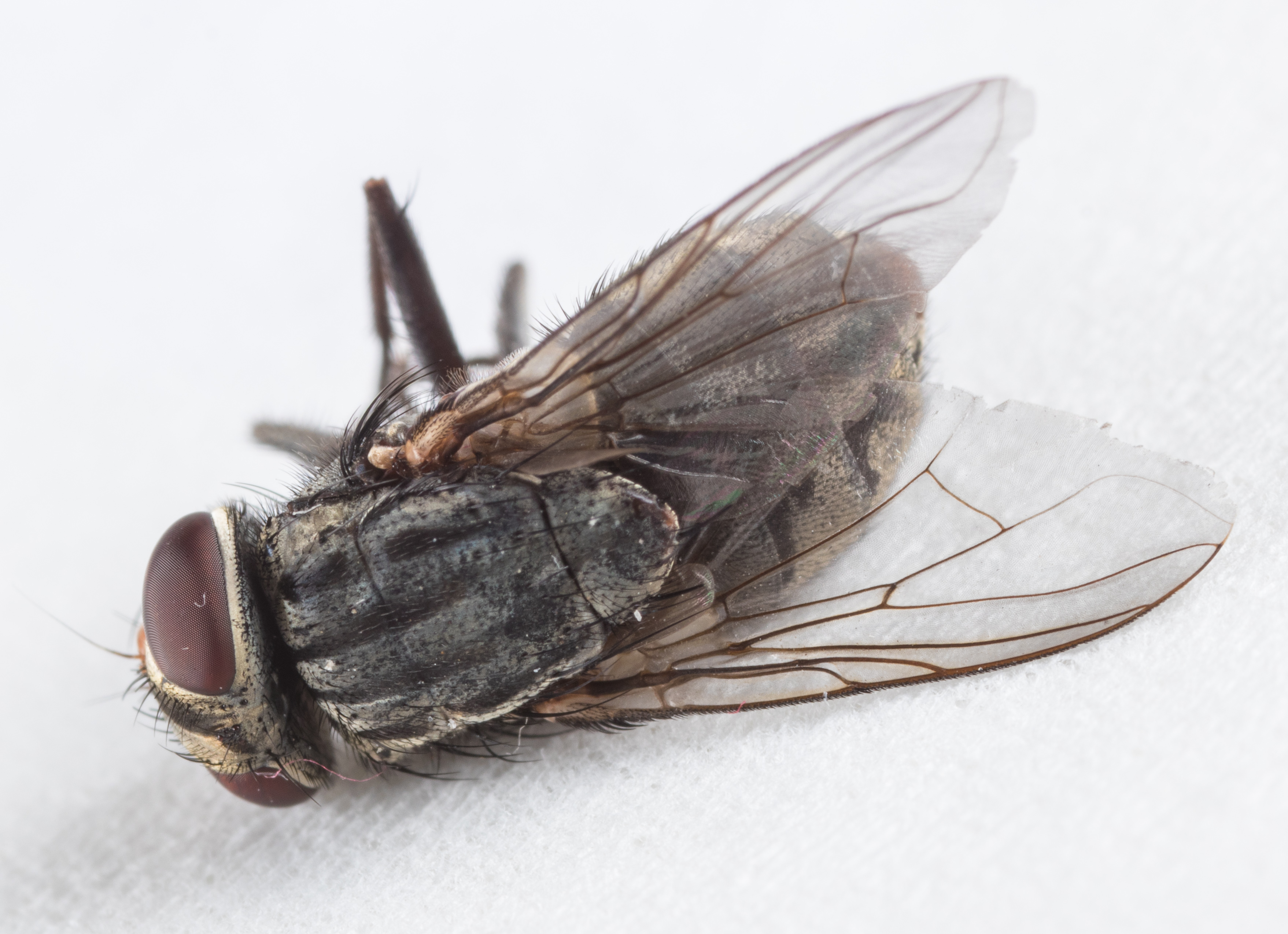
dorsal view

The Synthesiomyia nudiseta fly is one of the largest muscids, roughly 7 to 10 mm in length. As an adult fly, its abdomen is gray with a pattern resembling a checkerboard, similar to the type found on flesh flies. This species can be misidentified as a small sarcophagid; however, it can be easily separated from sarcophagids because the thorax consists of four longitudinal stripes and the terminal segment of the abdomen is yellow instead of red. The antennae and palpi also are orange or yellow in color. In more detail, the posterior spiracles on the adult fly have s- shaped slits, which allow for air to enter the insect’s trachea. It also contains a highly chitinized and complete peritreme.

More significant characteristics of S. nudiseta are its large and predacious larvae which can easily consume C. rufiffacies. Spiracular buttons are present in the premature third instar. The anterior spiracles contain five to seven papillae each. The puparia are enclosed in a silky white substance for protection.

It is also closely related to Muscina differing primarily in the precise details of larval and adult morphology and in its location. Furthermore, some significant identifying characteristics for the adult flies in the family musicdae include a pair of antennae, three segmented plumose aristae, a frontal suture, well developed calypters, hypo pleura without bristles, and more than one sternopleural bristles. The distinct parastomal sclerite in the second instar larva can be known as its most unusual identifying characteristic.

== Diet ==
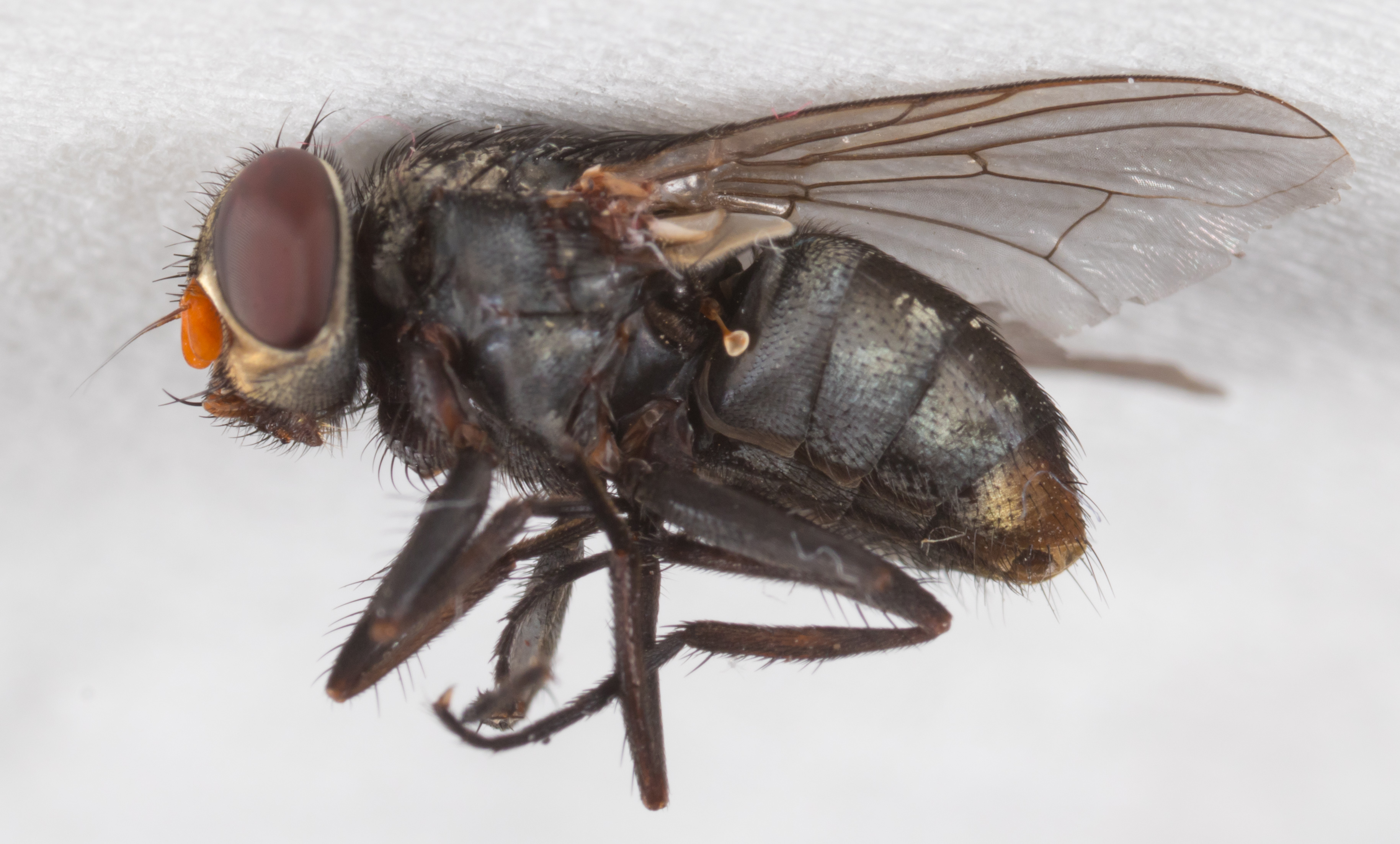
lateral view

Larvae prefer carrion as their primary source of food but have been found in feces, rotting vegetable materials, and garbage. These larvae only feed on the surface of their food instead of burrowing in like other larvae in the same order. It has also been found that the larvae of S. nudiseta are very large and predacious. They are known to devour the larvae of Chrysomya rufifacies, commonly known as the hairy maggot blow fly.

== Life cycle ==
The S. nudiseta flies are one of the first to arrive on the source of their food and lay their eggs, which are about 1.3 mm long. The larvae however, develop more slowly when compared to the larvae of the flies that arrive with S. nudiseta. Pupatation occurs even later with the larvae of the later arriving fly species.

The life cycle of S. nudiseta from egg to adult lasts anywhere between 22–30 days and includes 3 instars. The species survives best in room temperature and warm environments, the optimal range for survival is anywhere from 25–31 degrees Celsius. S. nudiseta can introduce from four to nine generations per year. The higher the temperature is the larger the generation number will be.

The entire larval stage for S. nudiseta lasts for approximately 13–15 days. Through research and experimentation, it has been found that the developmental period for the first instar is about 24 hours, the period is greater for the second instar, approximately 48 hours and the third instar has the longest developmental period at 230 hours.

The first instar of the larval stage is between 1.5–3 mm long. These larvae have been found to have a very high mortality rate when compared to other larvae at this stage of development. There is only approximately a 65% survival rate after this instar. At the second instar, the larvae are 3–7 mm long and have a very high level of viability. During the third instar level, the larvae are 7–19.5 mm. This level is broken down into two stages. The first stage is when the larvae continue to feed and collect nutrients needed during pupation. The second stage of development is when the third instar larvae begin the search for a suitable place to pupate where it can begin the pre-pupal stage.

During the pre-pupal stage, the larvae begin to excrete a silk-like white liquid from their salivary glands which solidifies into a sort of scleritized protective film from which the puparium will form. The puparium is 7–8 mm in length and a brown-red color. The puparium is covered by a dirty white cocoon.

Pupation occurs relatively close to the food source of the S. nudiseta larvae because they tend to not typically migrate very far. S. nudiseta larvae are one of the few species that can successfully pupate in a confined location. Besides the encasing cocoon, the outside environment is also helpful to the protection of this puparium since dust and soil particles have been found coating the outside surface.

== Distribution ==
Synthesiomyia nudiseta is found in tropical and subtropical regions. In the United States it is mainly collected from California to Texas and from North Carolina to Florida. Adult flies prefer direct sunlight and can usually be found outdoors. In Europe it is an introduced species and has only been recorded in Portugal, Spain and Italy.

== Forensic importance ==
Synthesiomyia nudiseta is a species that is found to be quite necrophilous. Like other Muscidae species, it prefers to surround itself in a wide range from garbage to human and animal remains. S. nudiseta will pupate slowly and in a restricted environment, and prefer not to migrate far away from the resource. Therefore, in stages of decomposition of forensic importance it is essential to verify all areas in close proximity to the corpse. Pupa have typically been found in victims’ clothing in places such as the elastic waistbands of pants, the inner surfaces of the victim’s clothing, and even in the space in between the body and the ground. In the life cycle during stages of decomposition, S. nudiseta will be inclined to pupate with other species of flies when they arrive later in different waves. Depending on where S. nudiseta happens to be located geographically can affect how delayed the fly will take to pupate. For instance, in Hawaii, S. nudiseta is apt to feed on carrion as a food source and pupation invades similar to the flesh fly genus Sarcophaga, which is the second general decomposition wave.
