= Ilythea caniceps =

Scientific classification
- Kingdom: Animalia
- Phylum: Arthropoda
- Class: Insecta
- Order: Diptera
- Family: Ephydridae
- Subfamily: Ilytheinae
- Tribe: Ilytheini
- Genus: Ilythea
- Species: I. caniceps

Binomial name
- Ilythea caniceps Cresson, 1918

Species of fly

Ilythea caniceps is a species of shore flies in the family Ephydridae.

== Distribution ==
United States, Neotropical.
