= Austroascia segersi =

Scientific classification
- Kingdom: Animalia
- Phylum: Arthropoda
- Class: Insecta
- Order: Diptera
- Family: Syrphidae
- Subfamily: Eristalinae
- Tribe: Brachyopini
- Subtribe: Spheginina
- Genus: Austroascia
- Species: A. segersi

Binomial name
- Austroascia segersi Thompson & Marnef, 1977

Species of fly

Austroascia segersi is a species of Hoverfly in the family Syrphidae.

== Distribution ==
Chile.
