= Neoascia metallica =

Scientific classification
- Kingdom: Animalia
- Phylum: Arthropoda
- Class: Insecta
- Order: Diptera
- Family: Syrphidae
- Subfamily: Eristalinae
- Tribe: Brachyopini
- Subtribe: Spheginina
- Genus: Neoascia
- Species: N. metallica

Binomial name
- Neoascia metallica (Williston, 1882)

Synonyms
- List: Ascia metallica Williston, 1882; Ascia nasuta Bigot, 1883; Ascia quadrinotata Bigot, 1883; Neoascia minuta Curran, 1925

Species of fly

Neoascia metallica (Williston, 1882), the double-banded fen fly, is a common species of syrphid fly observed across North America. Hoverflies can remain nearly motionless in flight. The adults are also known as flower flies, for they are commonly found on flowers, from which they get both energy-giving nectar and protein-rich pollen. The larvae are aquatic.

== Distribution ==
Canada, United States.
