= Neoascia longiscutata =

Scientific classification
- Kingdom: Animalia
- Phylum: Arthropoda
- Class: Insecta
- Order: Diptera
- Family: Syrphidae
- Subfamily: Eristalinae
- Tribe: Brachyopini
- Subtribe: Spheginina
- Genus: Neoascia
- Species: N. longiscutata

Binomial name
- Neoascia longiscutata (Shiraki, 1930)

Synonyms
- Ascia longiscutata Shiraki, 1930; Ascia breviscutata Shiraki, 1930

Species of fly

Neoascia longiscutata is a species of hoverfly in the family Syrphidae.

== Distribution ==
Japan.
