= Philygria nigrescens =

Scientific classification
- Domain: Eukaryota
- Kingdom: Animalia
- Phylum: Arthropoda
- Class: Insecta
- Order: Diptera
- Family: Ephydridae
- Genus: Philygria
- Species: P. nigrescens

Binomial name
- Philygria nigrescens (Cresson, 1930)

Synonyms
- Hydrina nigrescens Cresson, 1930

Species of fly

Philygria nigrescens is a species of shore flies in the family Ephydridae.
