= Hyadina =

Scientific classification
- Kingdom: Animalia
- Phylum: Arthropoda
- Clade: Pancrustacea
- Class: Insecta
- Order: Diptera
- Family: Ephydridae
- Subfamily: Ilytheinae
- Tribe: Ilytheini
- Genus: Hyadina; Haliday, 1837

Type species
- Notiphila guttata Curtis, 1832

Synonyms
- Hydrina Robineau-Desvoidy, 1830; Ephydrosoma Lioy, 1864; Neohydrellia Malloch, 1933

Genus of flies

Hyadina is a genus of shore flies in the family Ephydridae.

== Species ==
- H. agostinhoi Frey, 1945
- H. albovenosa Coquillett, 1900
- H. binotata (Cresson, 1926)
- H. borkumensis Stuke, 2020
- H. bulbosa Clausen, 1989
- H. certa Cresson, 1931
- H. clauseni Mathis & Zatwarnicki, 2004
- H. corona (Cresson, 1926)
- H. femorata Canzoneri & Rampini, 1998
- H. fenestrata Becker, 1903
- H. flavipes Sturtevant & Wheeler, 1954
- H. freidbergi Mathis & Zatwarnicki, 2004
- H. fukuharai Miyagi, 1977
- H. furva Cresson, 1926
- H. giordanii Canzoneri & Meneghini, 1975
- H. guttata (Fallén, 1813)
- H. hivaoae (Malloch, 1933)
- H. immaculata Becker, 1919
- H. irrorata Tonnoir & Malloch, 1926
- H. japonica Miyagi, 1977
- H. jinpingensis Zhang & Yang, 2009
- H. kugleri Mathis & Zatwarnicki, 2004
- H. longicaudata Zhang & Yang, 2009
- H. mathisi Canzoneri & Rampini, 1998
- H. meggiolaroi Canzoneri & Meneghini, 1975
- H. minima (Papp, 1975)
- H. munarii Mathis & Zatwarnicki, 2003
- H. nigricornis Frey, 1930
- H. nigrifacies Miyagi, 1977
- H. nigropleuralis Canzoneri & Meneghini, 1969
- H. nitida (Macquart, 1835)
- H. obscurifrons Tonnoir & Malloch, 1926
- H. pauciguttata Canzoneri, 1987
- H. penalbovenosa Clausen, 1983
- H. pollinosa Oldenberg, 1923
- H. porteri Brèthes, 1919
- H. pruinosa (Cresson, 1926)
- H. pseudonitida Canzoneri & Meneghini, 1969
- H. pulchella Miyagi, 1977
- H. pullipes Cresson, 1930
- H. quinquepunctata Zhang & Yang, 2009
- H. rufipes (Meigen, 1830)
- H. sauteri Cresson, 1934
- H. scutellata (Haliday, 1839)
- H. subnitida Sturtevant and Wheeler, 1954
- H. ukundensis Canzoneri & Meneghini, 1987
- H. vittifacies Hardy, 1965
- H. vockerothi Clausen, 1984
- H. xanthopus Frey, 1958
