= Chamaesphegina =

Scientific classification
- Kingdom: Animalia
- Phylum: Arthropoda
- Class: Insecta
- Order: Diptera
- Family: Syrphidae
- Subfamily: Eristalinae
- Tribe: Brachyopini
- Subtribe: Spheginina
- Genus: Chamaesphegina; Shannon & Aubertin, 1933

Type species
- Chamaesphegina argentifacies Shannon & Aubertin, 1933

Synonyms
- Desmetrum (Enderlein, 1938)

Genus of flies

Chamaesphegina is a genus of South American hoverflies.

== Description ==
Shining bare elongate flies, face concave, with slightly projecting epistome. The hind margin of the scutellum forming a well defined ridge. Abdomen is elongate and more or less parallel sided, wings are long and slender. Legs are simple, with the hind femora with minute bristles. The genus was first described from 4 female specimens.

== Species ==
- C. argentifacies Shannon & Aubertin, 1933
- C. macra (Enderlein, 1938)
