= Austroascia =

Scientific classification
- Kingdom: Animalia
- Phylum: Arthropoda
- Class: Insecta
- Order: Diptera
- Family: Syrphidae
- Subfamily: Eristalinae
- Tribe: Brachyopini
- Subtribe: Spheginina
- Genus: Austroascia; Thompson & Marnef 1977

Type species
- Austroascia segersi Thompson & Marnef, 1977

Genus of flies

Austroascia is a genus of hoverflies.

== Species ==
- A. segersi Thompson & Marnef, 1977
