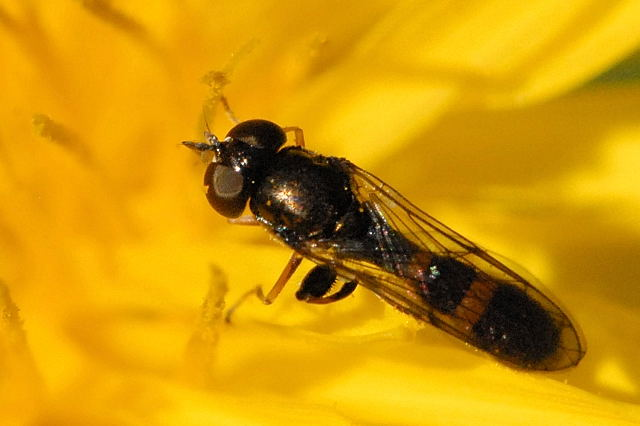

Scientific classification
- Kingdom: Animalia
- Phylum: Arthropoda
- Class: Insecta
- Order: Diptera
- Family: Syrphidae
- Subfamily: Eristalinae
- Tribe: Brachyopini
- Subtribe: Spheginina
- Genus: Neoascia
- Species: N. podagrica

Binomial name
- Neoascia podagrica (Fabricius, 1775)

Synonyms
- Syrphus podagrica Fabricius, 1775; Musca molio Harris, 1780; Ascia floralis Meigen, 1822; Ascia lanceolata Meigen, 1822; Neoascia molio (Harris, 1780); Ascia maculata Macquart, 1829; Syrphus podagricus Fabricius, 1775; Ascia bipunctata Curtis, 1837

= Neoascia podagrica =

Species of fly

Neoascia podagrica is a species of hoverfly.

== Description ==
External images For terms see Morphology of Diptera
Metapleurae form a continuous band behind coxae 3. Antennomere 3 twice as long as broad and wing veins tm and tp brownish. Male tergite with straight yellow band. The larva is figured by Hartley (1961) The male genitalia are illustrated by Barkemeyer and Claussen (1986).

See references for determination.

== Distribution ==
Palearctic Fennoscandia South to Iberia Mediterranean basin East through North Europe, Central Europe and South Europe (Italy, the former Yugoslavia, Greece) to Turkey and Israel, European Russia into Siberia as far as Lake Baikal.

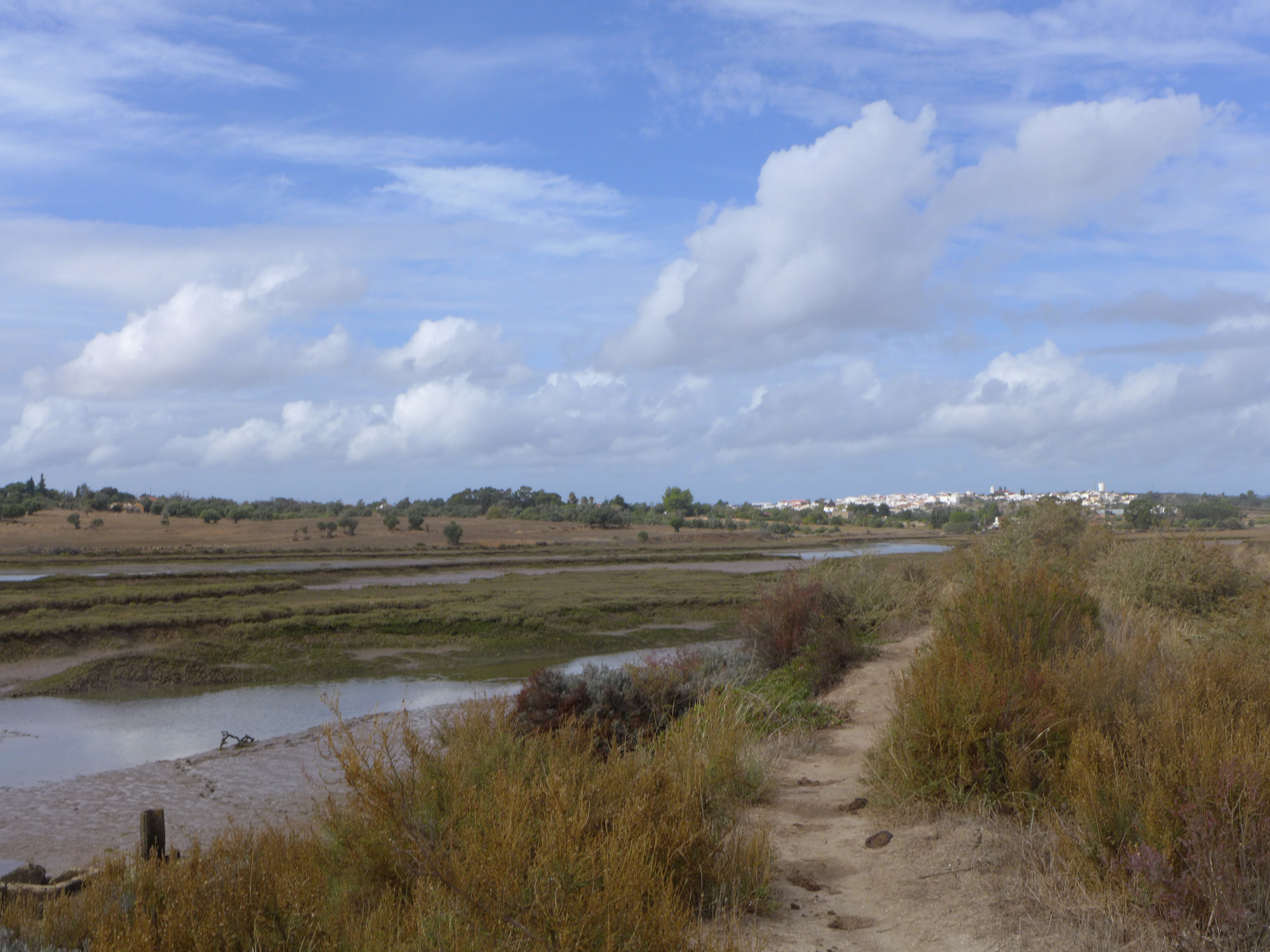
Habitat.Portugal

== Biology ==
Habitat: wetlands and alluvial forest, pond margins and fen, wet pasture, along wet ditches, around farmyards, canal banks, suburban gardens, rubbish dumps and parks. Flowers visited include white umbellifers, Achillea millefolium, Allium ursinum, Caltha, Chelidonium, Convolvulus, Crataegus, Euphorbia, Leontodon, Menyanthes, Plantago, Potentilla erecta, Ranunculus, Salix repens, Senecio jacobaea, Taraxacum.

The flight period is April to October. The larvae are sub-aquatic, occurring in cow-dung, slurry and dung-enriched mud.
