= Philygria debilis =

Scientific classification
- Domain: Eukaryota
- Kingdom: Animalia
- Phylum: Arthropoda
- Class: Insecta
- Order: Diptera
- Family: Ephydridae
- Genus: Philygria
- Species: P. debilis

Binomial name
- Philygria debilis Loew, 1861

Synonyms
- Cressoniella montana Sæther, 1970; Philygria fuscicornis Loew, 1862

Species of fly

Philygria debilis is a species of shore flies (insects in the family Ephydridae).

- P. debilis Loew, 1861
