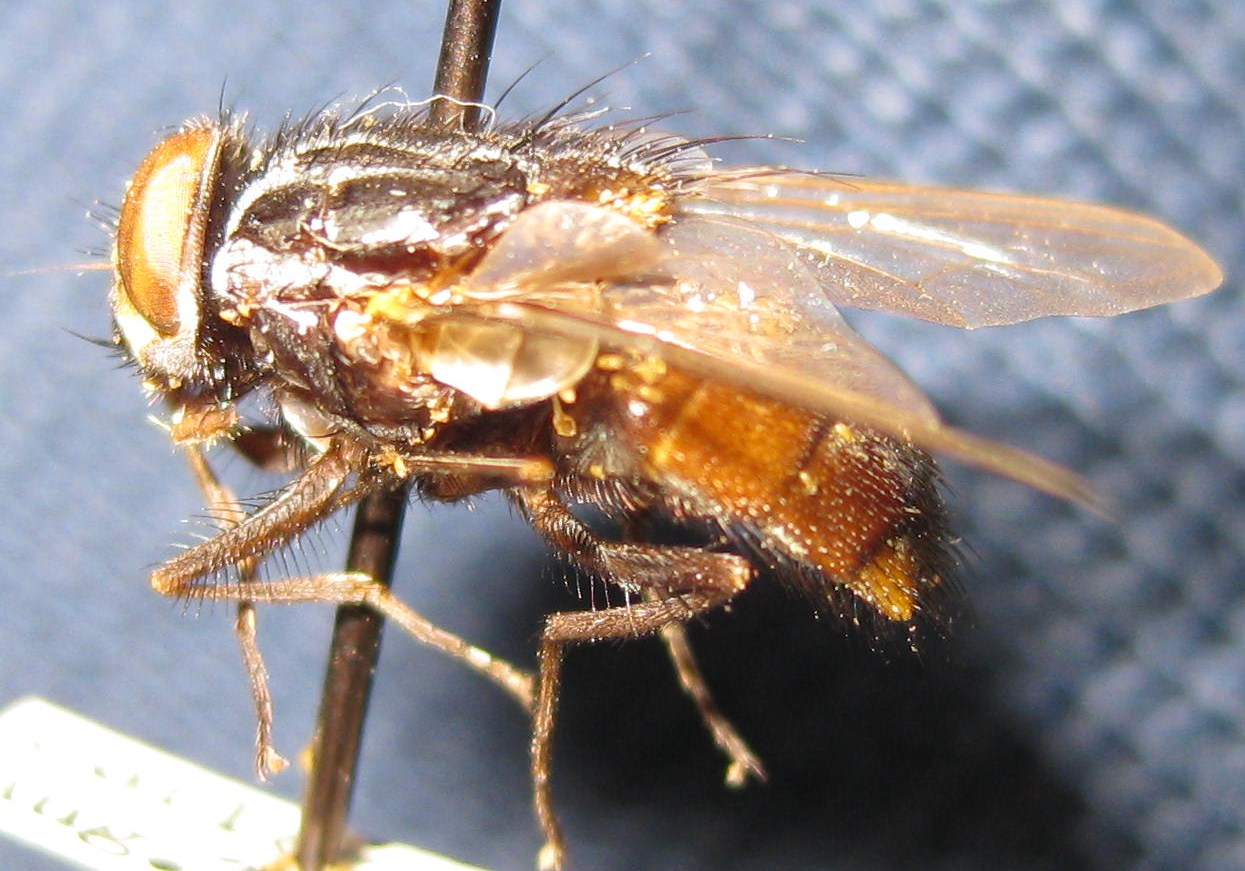
- Synthesiomyia nudiseta, pinned specimen

Scientific classification
- Domain: Eukaryota
- Kingdom: Animalia
- Phylum: Arthropoda
- Class: Insecta
- Order: Diptera
- Family: Muscidae
- Subfamily: Azeliinae
- Tribe: Reinwardtiini
- Genus: Synthesiomyia; Brauer & von Bergenstamm, 1893

Type species
- Synthesiomyia brasiliana Brauer & von Bergenstamm, 1893

= Synthesiomyia =

Genus of flies

Synthesiomyia is a small genus of true flies of the family Muscidae.

== Species ==
- Synthesiomyia nudiseta (Wulp, 1883)
