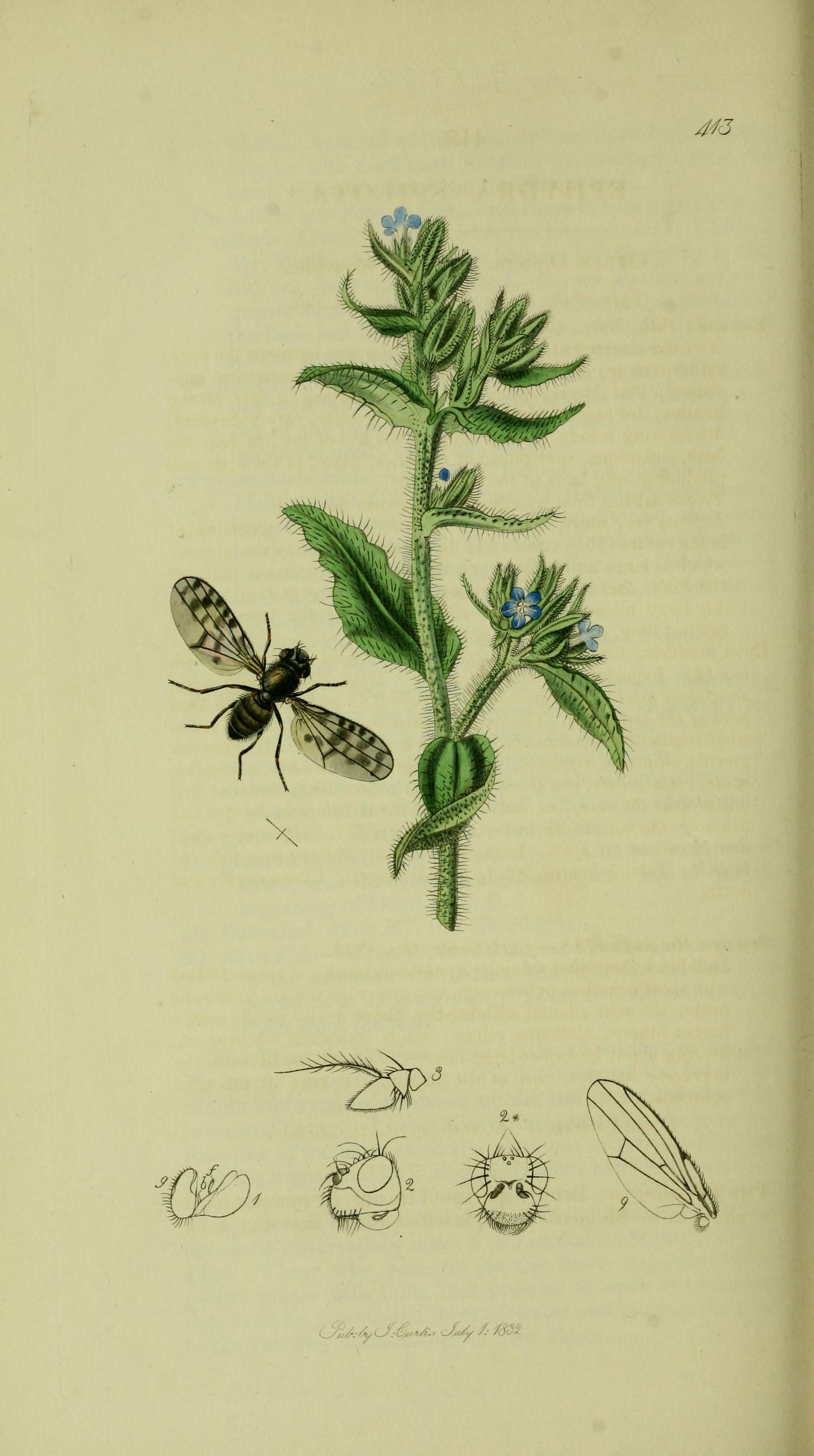
- Illustration of Ilythea spilota

Scientific classification
- Kingdom: Animalia
- Phylum: Arthropoda
- Class: Insecta
- Order: Diptera
- Family: Ephydridae
- Subfamily: Ilytheinae
- Tribe: Ilytheini
- Genus: Ilythea; Haliday, 1837

Type species
- Ephydra spilota Curtis, 1832

Synonyms
- Epipela Stenhammar, 1844; Dichaetopareia Oldenberg, 1923

= Ilythea =

Genus of flies

Ilythea is a genus of shore flies in the family Ephydridae.

== Species ==
- I. argentata Canzoneri & Meneghini, 1969
- I. caniceps Cresson, 1918
- I. carlestolrai Canzoneri, 1993
- I. cressoni Edwards, 1933
- I. flaviceps Cresson, 1916
- I. fusca Cresson, 1916
- I. japonica Miyagi, 1977
- I. mengalaensis Zhang & Yang, 2007
- I. nebulosa Becker, 1908
- I. niveoguttata Cresson, 1931
- I. spilota (Curtis, 1832)
- I. varipennis Oldenberg, 1923
