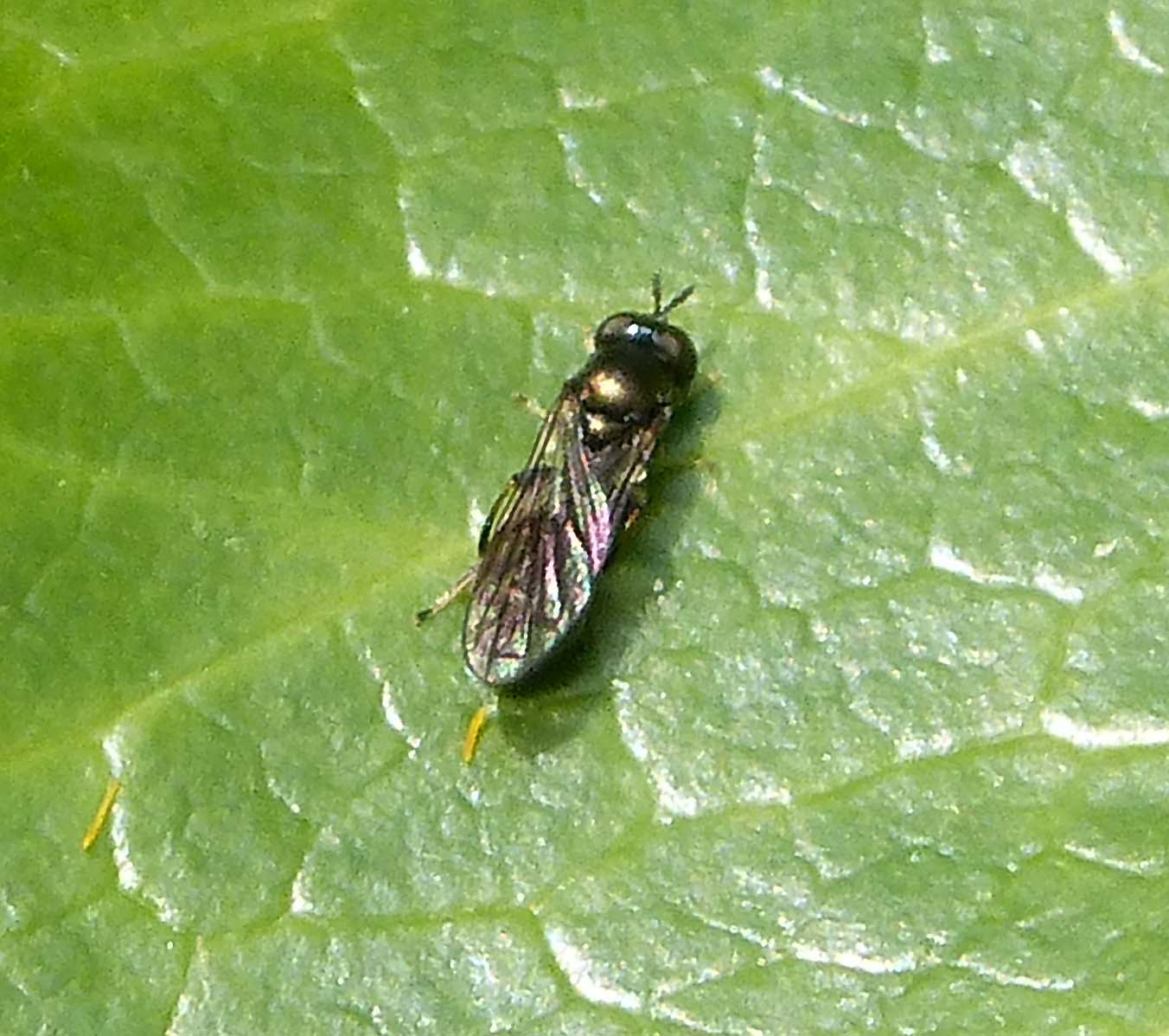

Scientific classification
- Kingdom: Animalia
- Phylum: Arthropoda
- Class: Insecta
- Order: Diptera
- Family: Syrphidae
- Subfamily: Eristalinae
- Tribe: Brachyopini
- Subtribe: Spheginina
- Genus: Neoascia
- Species: N. meticulosa

Binomial name
- Neoascia meticulosa (Scopoli, 1763)

Synonyms
- Ascia aenea Meigen, 1822; Ascia hastata Wiedemann, 1822; Ascia nitidula Meigen, 1822; Musca meticulosa Scopoli, 1763; Syrphus crassipes Schrank, 1785

= Neoascia meticulosa =

Species of fly

Neoascia meticulosa is a species of hoverfly.

== Description ==
External images For terms see Morphology of Diptera
Wing length 4.5–5 mm. Mouth edge protruding no more than a distance equal to 1/2 the horizontal diameter of an eye. Tibiae 1 and tibiae 2 yellow. Male abdomen black with yellow spots. Female abdomen broad and usually entirely black. Barkemeyer & Claussen (1986) figure the male genitalia. The larva is figured by Hartley (1961)) See references for determination. The male genitalia are illustrated by Barkemeyer and Claussen (1986)

== Distribution ==
Palearctic Fennoscandia South to North Spain, the Alps, Italy and Yugoslavia. Ireland East through North Europe and Central Europe into European Russia and the Caucasus. East through Siberia to Lake Baikal.

== Biology ==
Habitat: Wetlands, fens, ponds and stream margins. Flowers visited include white umbellifers, Anemone nemorosa, Caltha, Cardamine, Ficaria verna, Galium, Prunus avium, Ranunculus, Salix, Sorbus aucuparia, Taraxacum. The flight period is end April to June. The larva is aquatic and has found beneath the outer leaves of rotting Typha stems.
