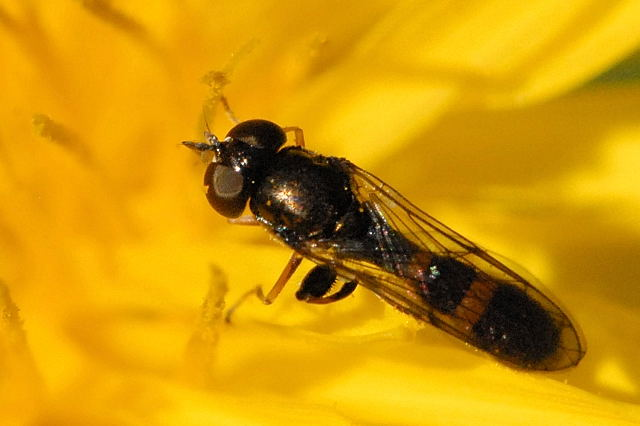
- Neoascia podagrica

Scientific classification
- Kingdom: Animalia
- Phylum: Arthropoda
- Clade: Pancrustacea
- Class: Insecta
- Order: Diptera
- Family: Syrphidae
- Subfamily: Eristalinae
- Tribe: Brachyopini
- Subtribe: Spheginina
- Genus: Neoascia; Williston, 1886

Type species
- Syrphus podagricus Fabricius, 1775

Subgenera
- Neoascia Williston, 1886; Neoasciella Stackelberg, 1965

Synonyms
- Ascia Meigen, 1822; Stenopipiza Matsumura, 1919

= Neoascia =

Genus of flies

Neoascia is a genus of small black and yellow or mostly black flies with a narrow abdomen near the thorax. They occur mainly in damp places among low herbage. The larva of Neoascia are flattened without oral hooks and a have a short posterior spiracular process or "tail", and are saprophagous. In 1925 Curran reviewed the genus Neoascia. In this work a key is provided and ten species are described including four new species some of which have later been determined to be synonyms.

== Species ==
- N. amurensis Mutin, 1993
- N. anassa Reemer & Hippa, 2005
- N. bipunctata (Matsumura, 1919)
- N. clausseni Hauser & Kassebeer, 1998
- N. confusa Mutin, 1993
- N. distincta Williston, 1887
- N. globosa (Walker, 1849)
- N. guttata Skevington & Moran, 2019
- N. inexpectata Hauser, 1998
- N. nana Reemer & Hippa, 2005
- N. subannexa Claussen & Hayat, 1997
- N. willistoni Thompson, 1986

Subgenus: Neoascia

- N. annexa (Müller, 1776)
- N. balearensis Kassebeer, 2002
- N. longiscutata (Shiraki, 1930)
- N. metallica (Williston, 1882)
- N. monticola Stackelberg, 1960
- N. pavlovskii Stackelberg, 1955
- N. podagrica (Fabricius, 1775)
- N. sphaerophoria Curran, 1925
- N. tenur (Harris, 1780)

Subgenus: Neoasciella

- N. carinicauda Stackelberg, 1955
- N. geniculata (Meigen, 1822)
- N. interrupta (Meigen, 1822)
- N. meticulosa (Scopoli, 1763)
- N. obliqua Coe, 1940
- N. subchalybea Curran, 1925
- N. tuberculifera Violovitsh, 1957
- N. unifasciata (Strobl, 1898)
