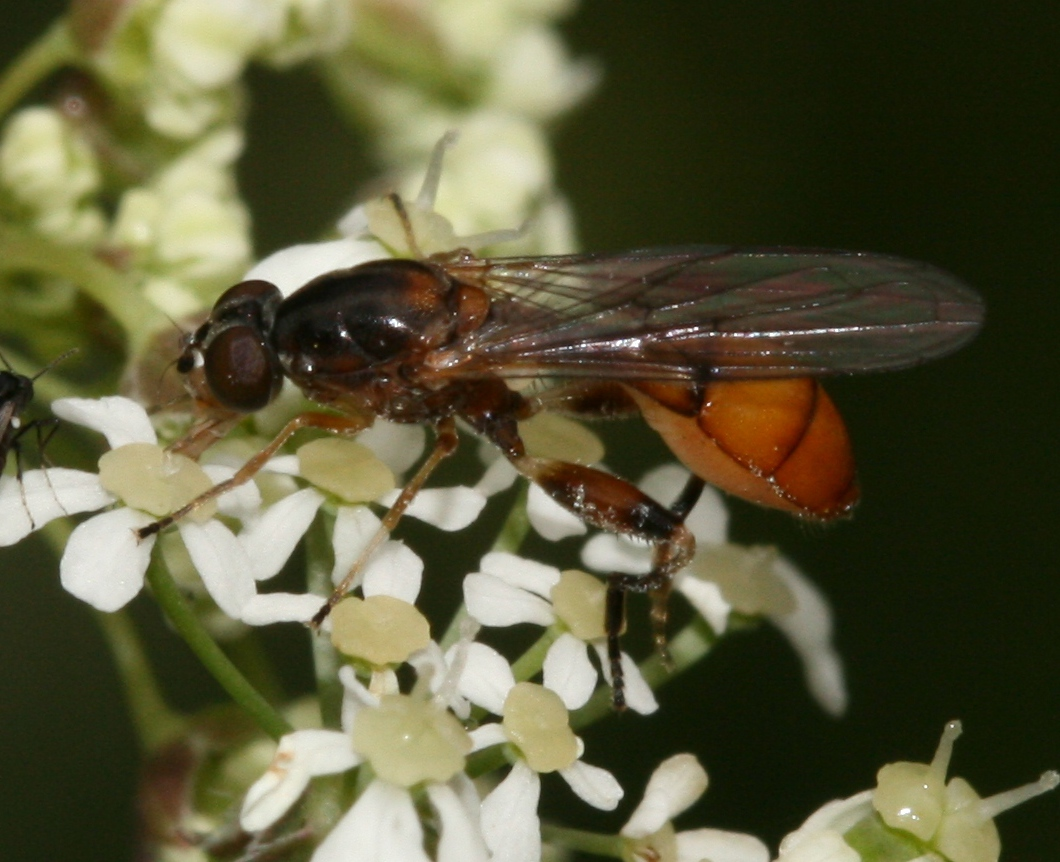
- Sphegina sibirica female

Scientific classification
- Kingdom: Animalia
- Phylum: Arthropoda
- Clade: Pancrustacea
- Class: Insecta
- Order: Diptera
- Family: Syrphidae
- Genus: Sphegina
- Species: S. sibirica

Binomial name
- Sphegina sibirica Stackelberg, 1953

= Sphegina sibirica =

Species of fly

Sphegina sibirica is a species of hoverfly.

== Distribution ==
Austria, Belgium, Great Britain, Czech Republic, Estonia, Finland, France, Germany, Hungary, Italy, Latvia, Liechtenstein, Lithuania, Netherlands, Norway, Romania, Slovakia, Slovenia, Sweden, Switzerland & Yugoslavia.
