= Philygria =

Scientific classification
- Domain: Eukaryota
- Kingdom: Animalia
- Phylum: Arthropoda
- Class: Insecta
- Order: Diptera
- Family: Ephydridae
- Subfamily: Ilytheinae
- Tribe: Hyadinini
- Genus: Philygria; Stenhammar, 1844

Type species
- Notiphila flavipes Fallén, 1823

Genus of flies

Philygria is a genus of shore flies (insects in the family Ephydridae).

== Species ==
These 44 species belong to the genus Philygria:

- P. albidipennis (Stenhammar, 1844)
- P. argentinae Hollmann-Schirrmacher, 1998^{c g}
- P. brincki Wirth, 1960^{c g}
- P. cedercreutzi Frey, 1945^{c g}
- P. chaci Hollmann-Schirrmacher, 1998^{c g}
- P. costalis (Canzoneri & Meneghini, 1969)^{c g}
- P. debilis Loew, 1861^{i c g b}
- P. dimidiata (Sturtevant and Wheeler, 1954)^{i c g}
- P. etzeli Hollmann-Schirrmacher, 1998^{c g}
- P. flavipes (Fallén, 1823)^{c g}
- P. flavitarsis Miyagi, 1977^{c g}
- P. galapagensis Wirth, 1969^{c g}
- P. gesae Hollmann-Schirrmacher, 1998^{c g}
- P. helmuti Hollmann-Schirrmacher, 1998^{c g}
- P. inpunctata (Becker, 1926)^{c g}
- P. interrupta (Haliday, 1833)^{c g}
- P. interstincta (Fallén, 1813)^{c g}
- P. longipennis (Hendel, 1930)^{c g}
- P. mackieae (Cresson, 1943)^{c g}
- P. maculipennis (Robineau-Desvoidy, 1830)^{c g}
- P. madeirae Hollmann-Schirrmacher, 1998^{c g}
- P. minima (Canzoneri & Meneghini, 1969)^{c}
- P. miyagii Hollmann-Schirrmacher, 1998^{c g}
- P. mocsaryi Kertész, 1910^{c g}
- P. morans (Cresson, 1930)^{c g}
- P. nepalensis (Dahl, 1968)^{c g}
- P. nigrescens (Cresson, 1930)^{i c g b}
- P. nigricauda (Stenhammar, 1844)
- P. nitifrons (Williston, 1896)^{c g}
- P. nubeculosa Strobl, 1909^{c g}
- P. obtecta Becker, 1896^{c g}
- P. olololosensis Canzoneri & Meneghini, 1985^{c g}
- P. ololosensis Canzoneri & Meneghini, 1985^{c g}
- P. opposita Loew, 1861^{i c g}
- P. pallipes (Meigen, 1838)^{c g}
- P. pappi Hollmann-Schirrmacher, 1998^{c g}
- P. posticata (Meigen, 1830)^{c g}
- P. punctatonervosa (Fallén, 1813)^{c g}
- P. stenoptera Hollmann-Schirrmacher, 1998^{c g}
- P. stictica (Meigen, 1830)^{c g}
- P. takagii Miyagi, 1977^{c g}
- P. tirolis (Cresson, 1930)^{c g}
- P. trilineata Meijere, 1907^{c g}
- P. vittipennis (Zetterstedt, 1838)^{c g}

Data sources: i = ITIS, c = Catalogue of Life, g = GBIF, b = Bugguide.net
