= Garifuna (fly) =

Scientific classification
- Kingdom: Animalia
- Phylum: Arthropoda
- Class: Insecta
- Order: Diptera
- Family: Ephydridae
- Subfamily: Ilytheinae
- Tribe: Philygriini
- Genus: Garifuna; Mathis, 1997

Type species
- Garifuna sinuata Mathis, 1997

Genus of flies

Garifuna is a genus of shore flies in the family Ephydridae. The only known species is reported from Belize and Panama.

== Description ==
In the original description, under 'Remarks' (p. 64) it reads —"The patterned wing readily characterizes this species and will undoubtedly distinguish it from congeners, if any, that may be discovered. Characters of the male terminalia, especially the asymmetrical gonites, also will probably be diagnostic." Else (p. 64), for the examined specimens, it reads "TYPE MATERIAL.—The holotype male is labeled "BELIZE. Belize Dist: Turneffe Islands, Rope Walk Cay (17°13'N, 87°51'W)[,] 31 Mar 1993, W.N. Mathis." The allotype and one other paratype are from Panama. Canal Zone: Balboa, Feb 1 1958, M.R. Wheeler (1 ♂, 1 ♀; USNM)"

== Etymology ==
The genus name Garifuna is feminine, as defined in the original description. That further reports (p.64) that (the genus name) "is derived from the name of descendants of the Black Caribs who were deported from St. Vincent in 1797 and who eventually settled, beginning in 1823, in several villages and towns along the southern coast of Belize"

== Species ==
- Garifuna sinuata Mathis, 1997
