= Ilytheinae =

- Nostima picta

Scientific classification
- Kingdom: Animalia
- Phylum: Arthropoda
- Class: Insecta
- Order: Diptera
- Family: Ephydridae
- Subfamily: Ilytheinae; Cresson, 1943

Subfamily of flies

Ilytheinae is a subfamily of shore flies in the family Ephydridae.

== Genera ==
Tribe Ilytheini Cresson, 1943

- Donaceus Cresson, 1943
- Ilythea Haliday, 1837
- Zeros Cresson, 1943

Tribe Hyadinini Phillips et al. in Cresson, 1949

- Axysta Haliday, 1839
- Garifuna Mathis, 1997
- Hyadina Haliday, 1837
- Nostima Coquillett, 1900
- Parahyadina Tonnoir & Malloch, 1926
- Parydroptera Collin, 1913
- Pelina Haliday, 1837
- Pelinoides Cresson, 1931
- Philygria Stenhammar, 1844
