= Arista (insect anatomy) =

Bristle arising from the third antennal segment of an insect

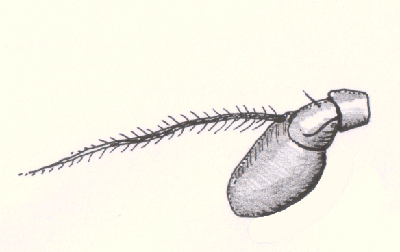
Brachycera antenna

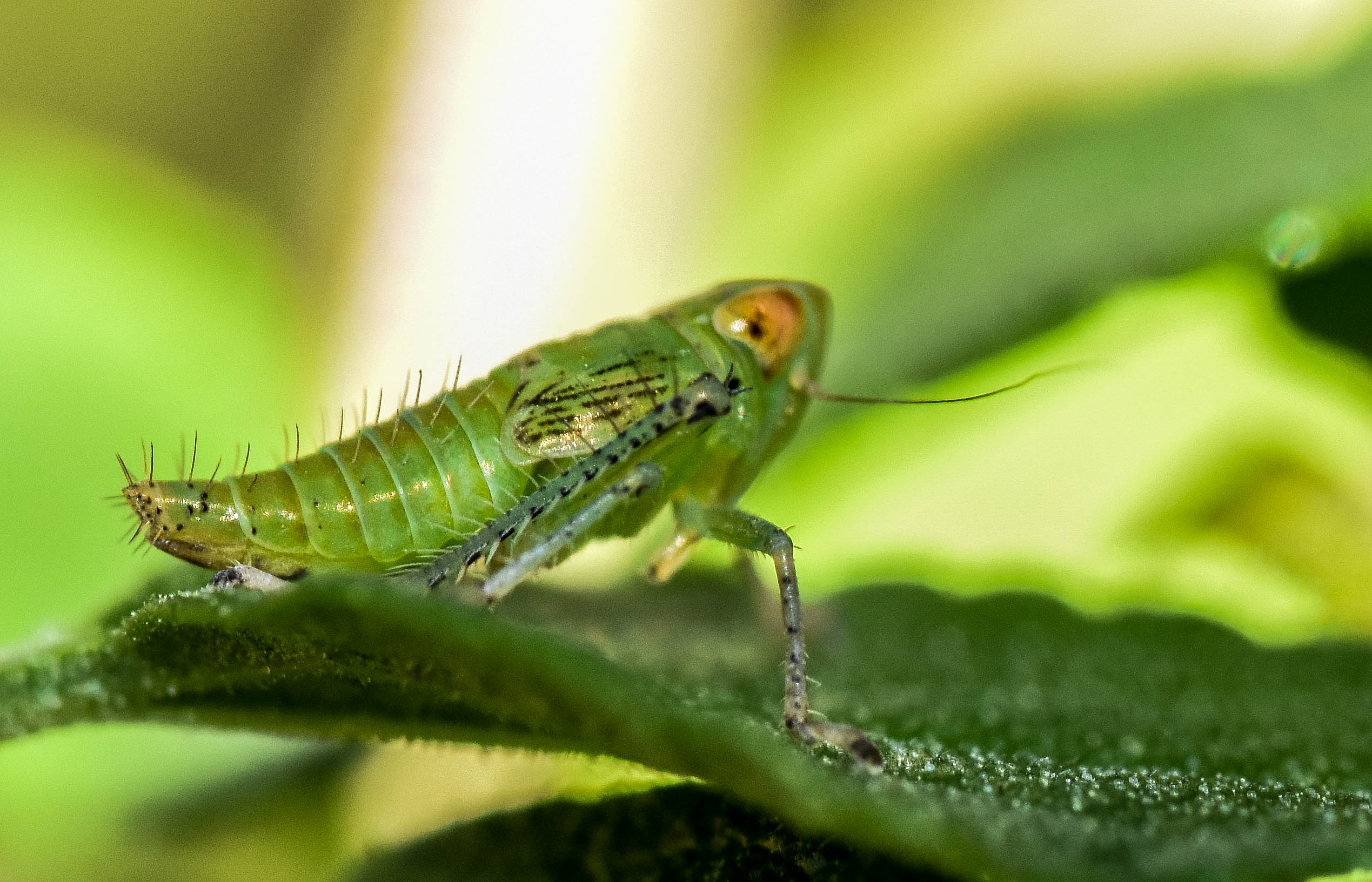
Leafhopper nymph (immature). Antenna displaying an arista

In insect anatomy, the arista is a simple or variously modified apical or subapical bristle, arising from the third antennal segment. It is the evolutionary remains of antennal segments, and may sometimes show signs of segmentation. These segments are called aristameres. The arista may be bare and thin, sometime appearing no more than a simple bristle; pubescent, covered in short hairs; or plumose, covered in long hairs.

The presence of an arista is a feature of the Diptera (flies) suborder Brachycera and may be especially well-developed in some species. It is also present in some members of Hemiptera (true bugs), specifically in the suborder Auchenorrhyncha. The arista is often covered in multiple kinds of sensilla, or sense organs, such as chemo, hygro, and thermoreceptors, which allow the insects to detect changes in their environment.
