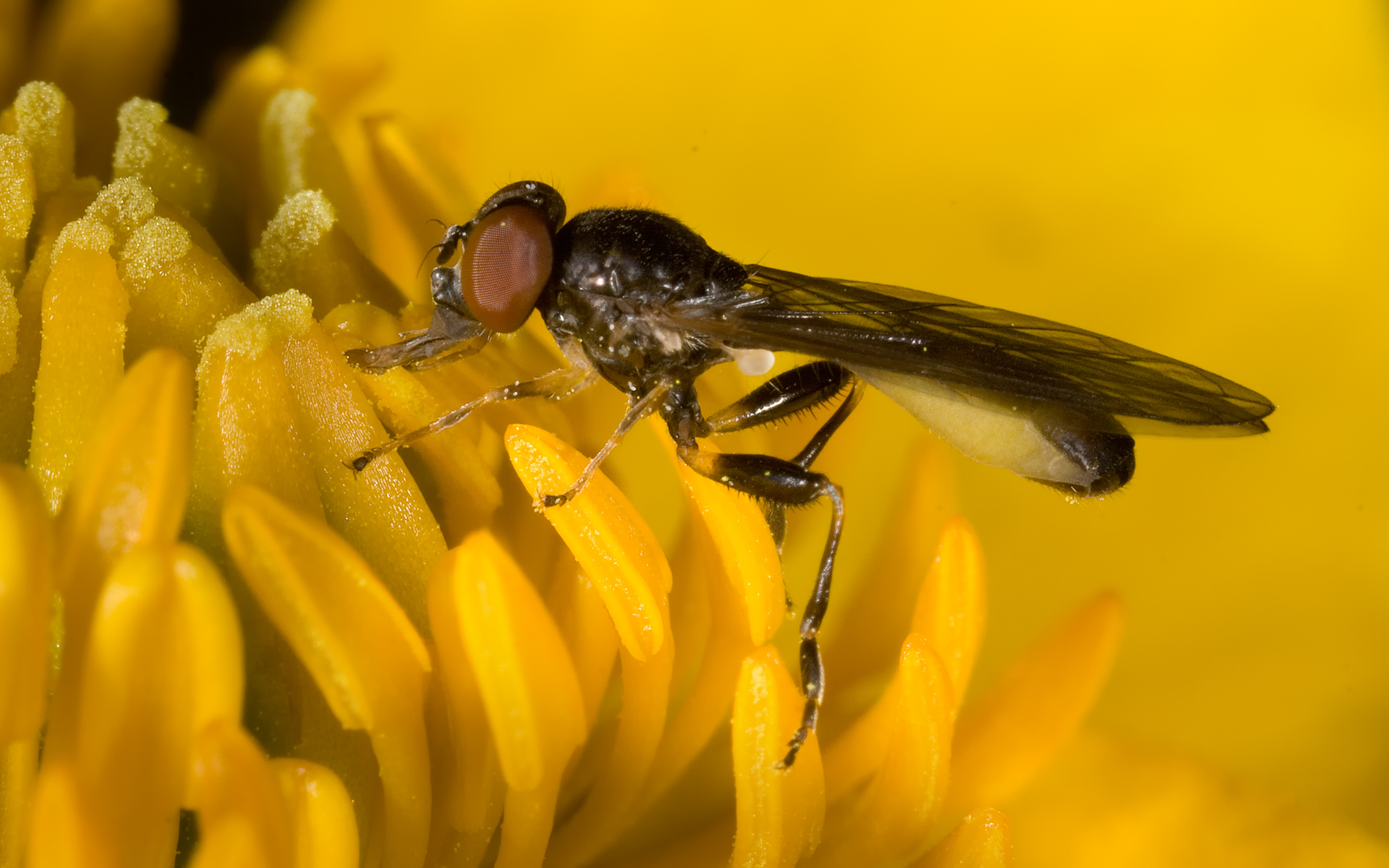
- Sphegina montana

Scientific classification
- Kingdom: Animalia
- Phylum: Arthropoda
- Clade: Pancrustacea
- Class: Insecta
- Order: Diptera
- Family: Syrphidae
- Subfamily: Eristalinae
- Tribe: Brachyopini
- Subtribe: Spheginina

Genera
- See text

= Spheginina =

Tribe of flies

The Spheginina is a subtribe of hoverflies.

== List of genera ==
- Austroascia Thompson & Marnef, 1977
- Chamaesphegina Shannon & Aubertin, 1933
- Neoascia Williston, 1887
- Sphegina Meigen, 1822
