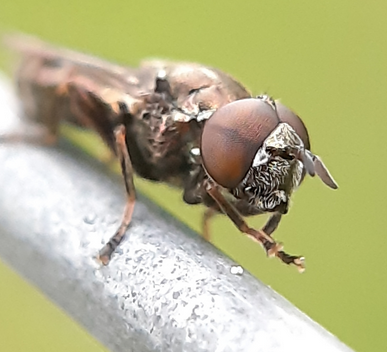
- Orthonevra pictipennis

Scientific classification
- Kingdom: Animalia
- Phylum: Arthropoda
- Clade: Pancrustacea
- Class: Insecta
- Order: Diptera
- Family: Syrphidae
- Subfamily: Eristalinae
- Tribe: Brachyopini
- Genus: Orthonevra
- Species: O. pictipennis

Binomial name
- Orthonevra pictipennis (Loew, 1863)
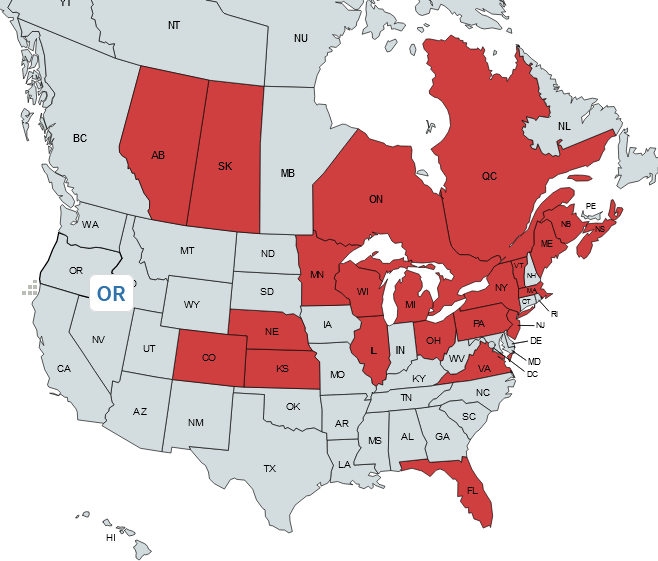
- distribution as of 2023

Synonyms
- Orthoneura pictipennis Loew, 1863; Paragus aeneus Walker, 1849

= Orthonevra pictipennis =

Species of fly

Orthonevra pictipennis (Loew,1863), the Dusky-veined Mucksucker, is an uncommon species of syrphid fly. It has been observed in North America (see range map). O. pictipennis shares much of the same range as O. pulchella, O. nitida and O. feei (only in New Hampshire). Hoverflies get their names from the ability to remain nearly motionless while in flight. The adults are also known as flower flies, for they are commonly found around and on flowers from which they get both energy-giving nectar and protein-rich pollen. Larvae for this genus are of the rat-tailed type. O. pictipennis larvae have not been described.

== Description ==
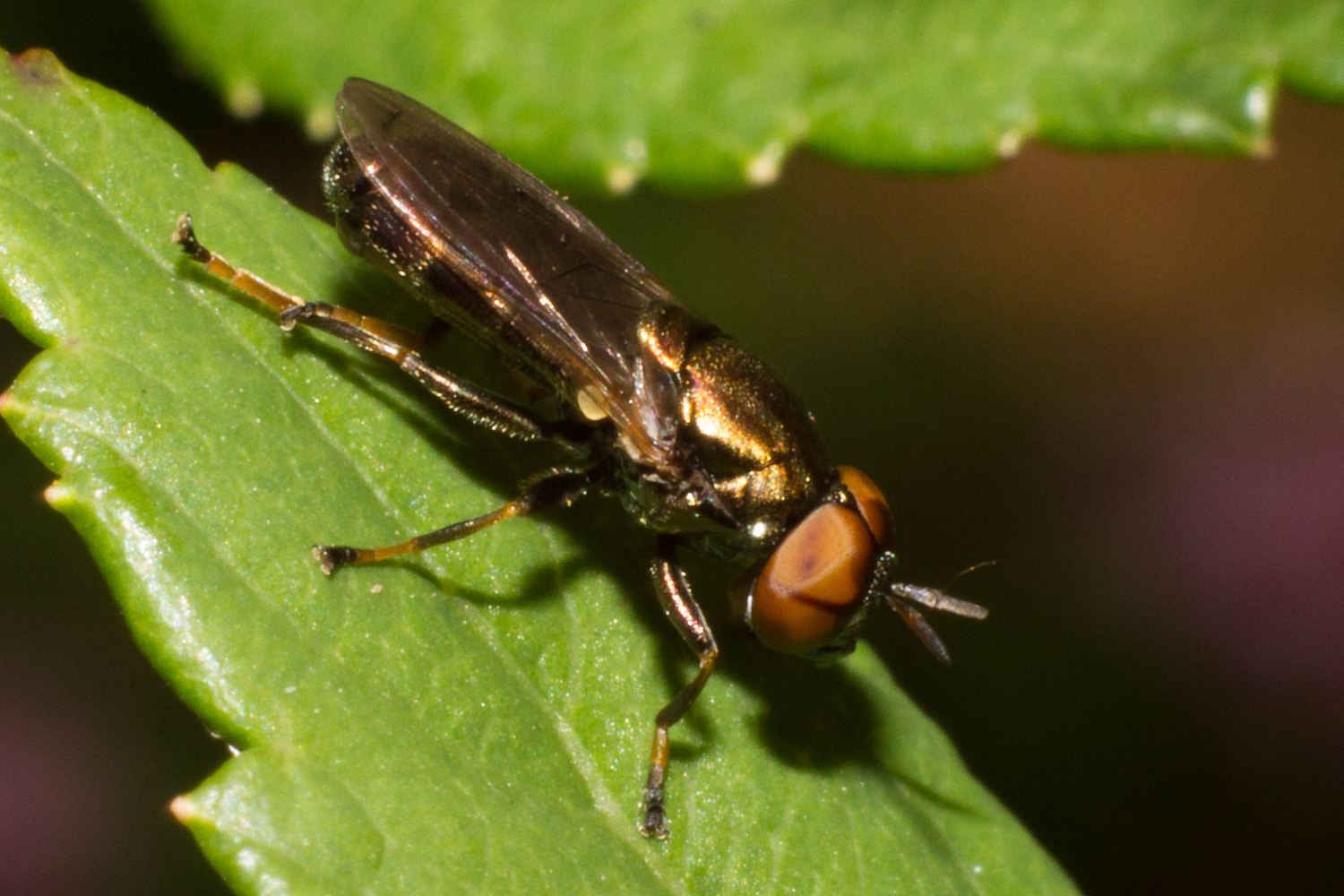
O. pictipennis male

For terminology see Speight key to genera and glossary

Size

Length 5.5–6 mm (0.22–0.24 in)

Head

The head has a metallic bronze-green color. In females, the frons is wide and noticeably wrinkled, with a slender groove running down the middle. The face is finely wrinkled in both males and females, with the epistoma projecting prominently. Near the eyes, on each side of the base of the antennae, there is a triangular spot that is silvery white. The face is covered in dense white hair. The antennae are reddish and considerably longer than the face, with the third segment not being three times longer than the second segment. The eyes are a solid color, with a horizontal stripe in the middle. In males, the eyes are holoptic.

Thorax

The scutum is moderately shining, finely punctate, with four bronze-purple stripes. The lateral stripes are abbreviated in front, the median ones are behind. The scutal pile is white. The scutellum appears flattened.

Wings

The wings are grayish with brownish spots on the discal and first posterior cells. The stigma and clouds on the crossveins are dark brown. The fourth vein (M) ends in the third vein before the tip of the second vein. The M_{1} vein is either recurrent or perpendicular. The R_{4+5} cell has a blunt or rectangular apex. The M_{2} vein divides the M_{1} vein approximately equally. The CuA1 vein extends as a spur on the posterior corner of the discal cell. The r-m crossvein is located at the basal one-third of the discal cell. The halteres are a pale yellowish color

Legs

The legs are a combination of green and black, with the base and tip of the tibiae, as well as the first two joints of the tarsi, being reddish yellow. The middle portion of all the tibiae is black.

Abdomen

The abdomen's disk has a moderate shine, with the edges exhibiting a shiny bronze-green or coppery color.
