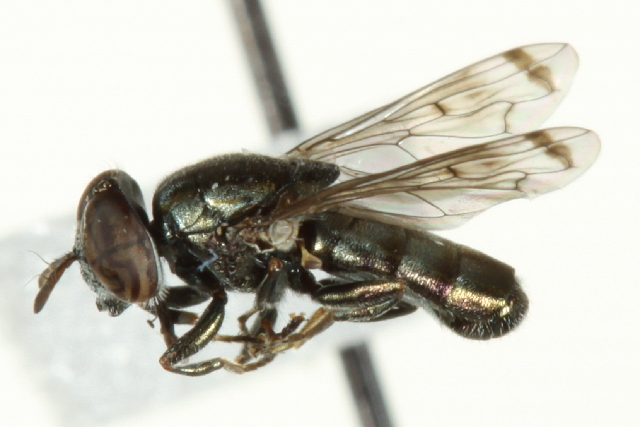
- O. nigrovittata

Scientific classification
- Domain: Eukaryota
- Kingdom: Animalia
- Phylum: Arthropoda
- Class: Insecta
- Order: Diptera
- Family: Syrphidae
- Subfamily: Eristalinae
- Tribe: Brachyopini
- Genus: Orthonevra
- Species: O. nigrovittata

Binomial name
- Orthonevra nigrovittata Loew 1876

Synonyms
- Chrysogaster nigrovittata Loew, 1876; Chrysogaster pacifica Shannon, 1916 .

= Orthonevra nigrovittata =

Species of fly

Orthonevra nigrovittata (Loew, 1876), the black-lined mucksucker, is a rare species of syrphid fly. It has been observed in California. Hoverflies get their names from the ability to remain nearly motionless while in flight. The adults are also known as flower flies for they are commonly found around and on flowers from which they get both energy-giving nectar and protein rich pollen. Larvae for this genus are of the rat-tailed type. O. nigrovittata larvae have not been described.
