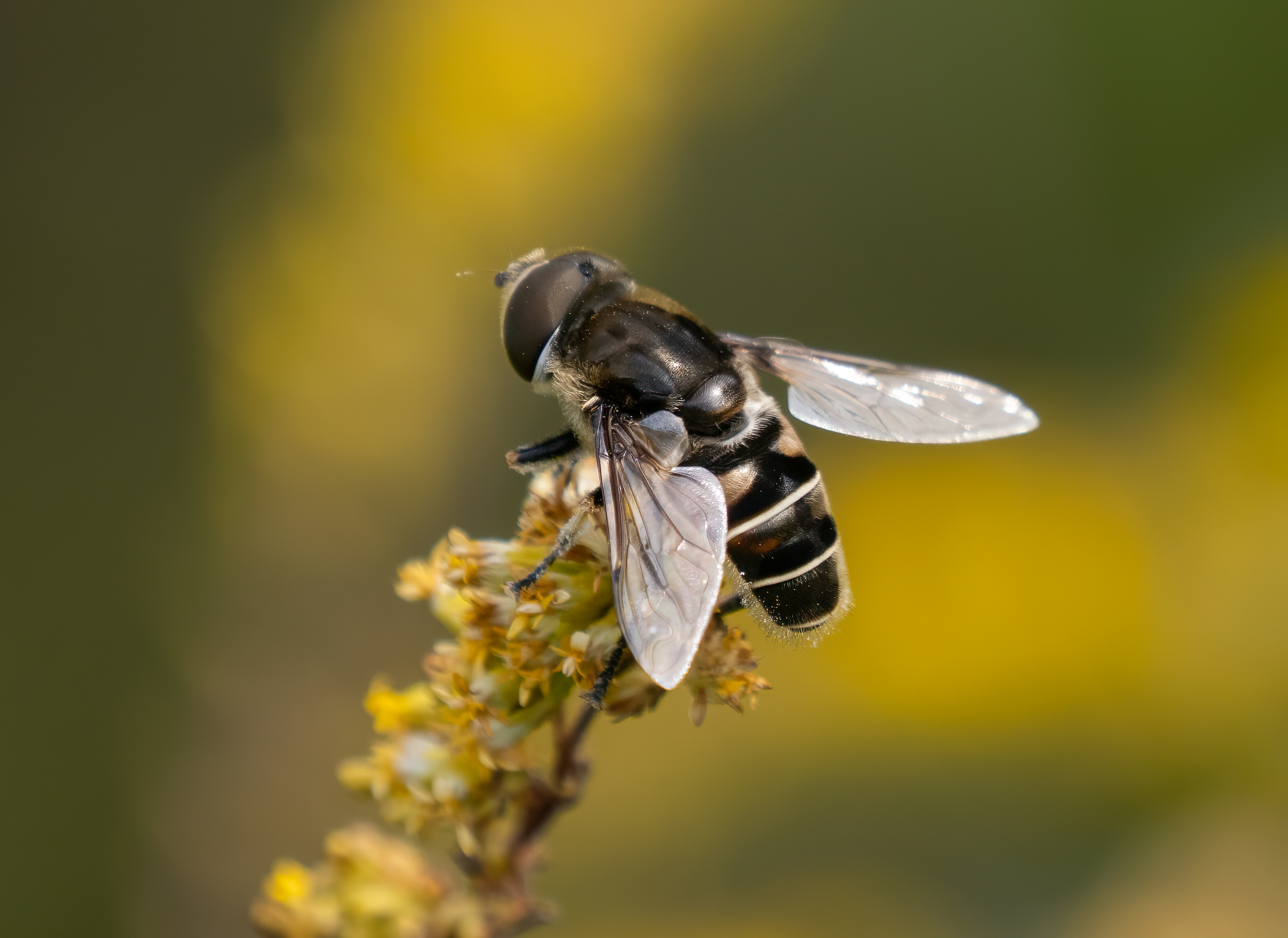
- Male
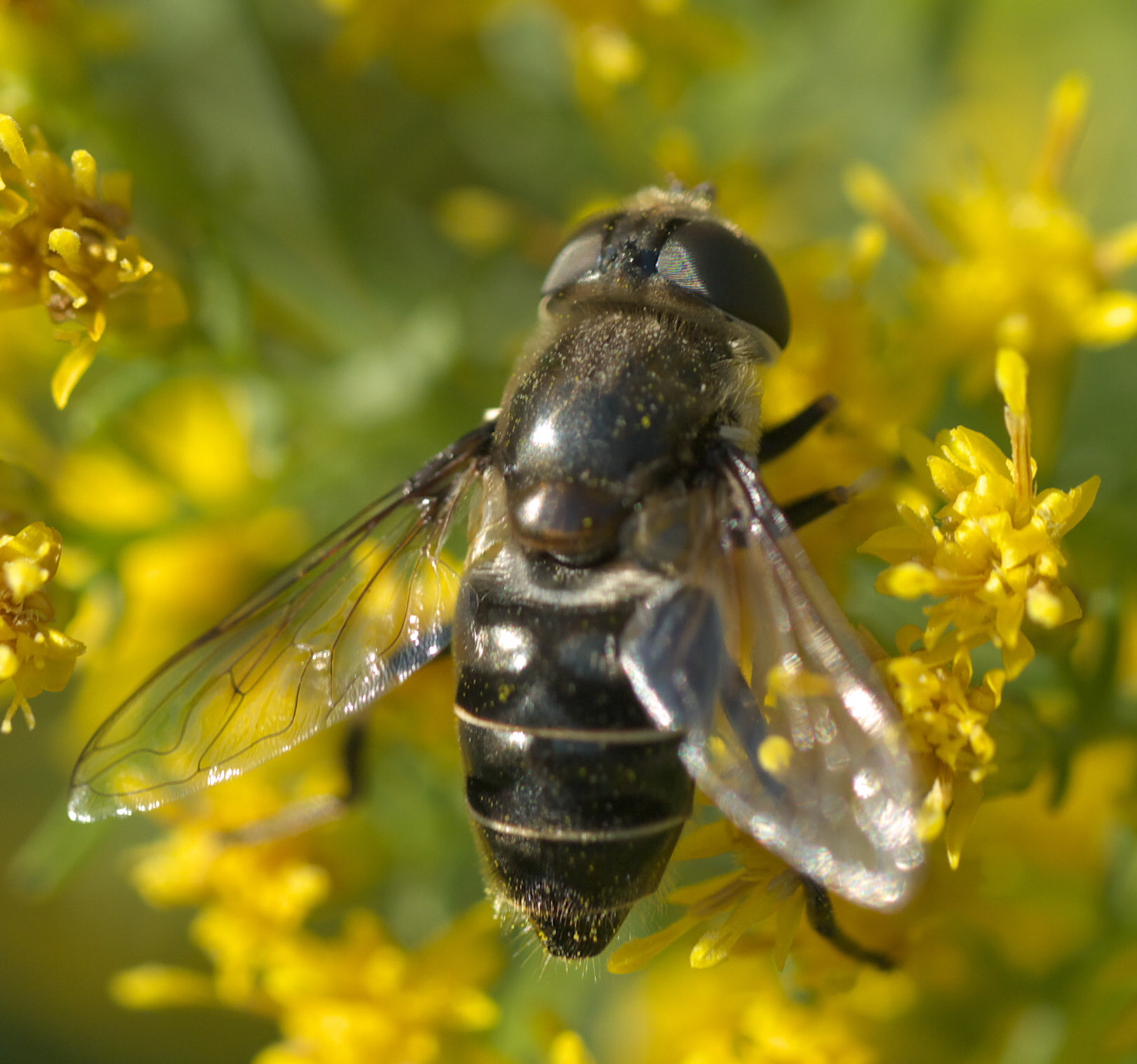
- Female

Scientific classification
- Kingdom: Animalia
- Phylum: Arthropoda
- Class: Insecta
- Order: Diptera
- Family: Syrphidae
- Genus: Eristalis
- Species: E. dimidiata

Binomial name
- Eristalis dimidiata Wiedemann, 1830

Synonyms
- Eristalis chalybaeus Macquart, 1842; Eristalis chalybeus Macquart, 1842; Eristalis dimidiatus Wiedemann, 1830; Eristalis haesitans Walker, 1849; Eristalis incisuralis Macquart, 1850; Eristalis inflexus Walker, 1849; Eristalis lherminierii Macquart, 1842; Eristalis niger Macquart, 1834

= Eristalis dimidiata =

Species of insect

Eristalis dimidiata, the black-shouldered drone fly, is a species of hoverfly native to much of Canada and the eastern and northern United States. It flies year-round in southern areas and from late March to mid-November further north. It is one of the earliest hoverflies to fly in the spring, and as such likely overwinters as an adult. It lives primarily in forests.

Hoverflies get their names from the ability to remain nearly motionless while in flight. The adults are also known as flower flies as they are commonly found on and around flowers, from which they get both energy-giving nectar and protein-rich pollen. The larvae are aquatic filter-feeders of the rat-tailed type.

== Description ==
Black-shouldered drone flies have opaque, infuscated humeral cells (at the base of their wings), with the rest of the wing entirely hyaline (transparent), except for possibly a diffuse medial spot on the wing. Their hind tarsi are entirely black. Overall, much of the fly is black, though the wings are mostly transparent and the posterior margins of the abdominal segments are white. Their pterostigma are dark brown and distinct. They have one to six short bristles on the dorsus (back) of their arista.

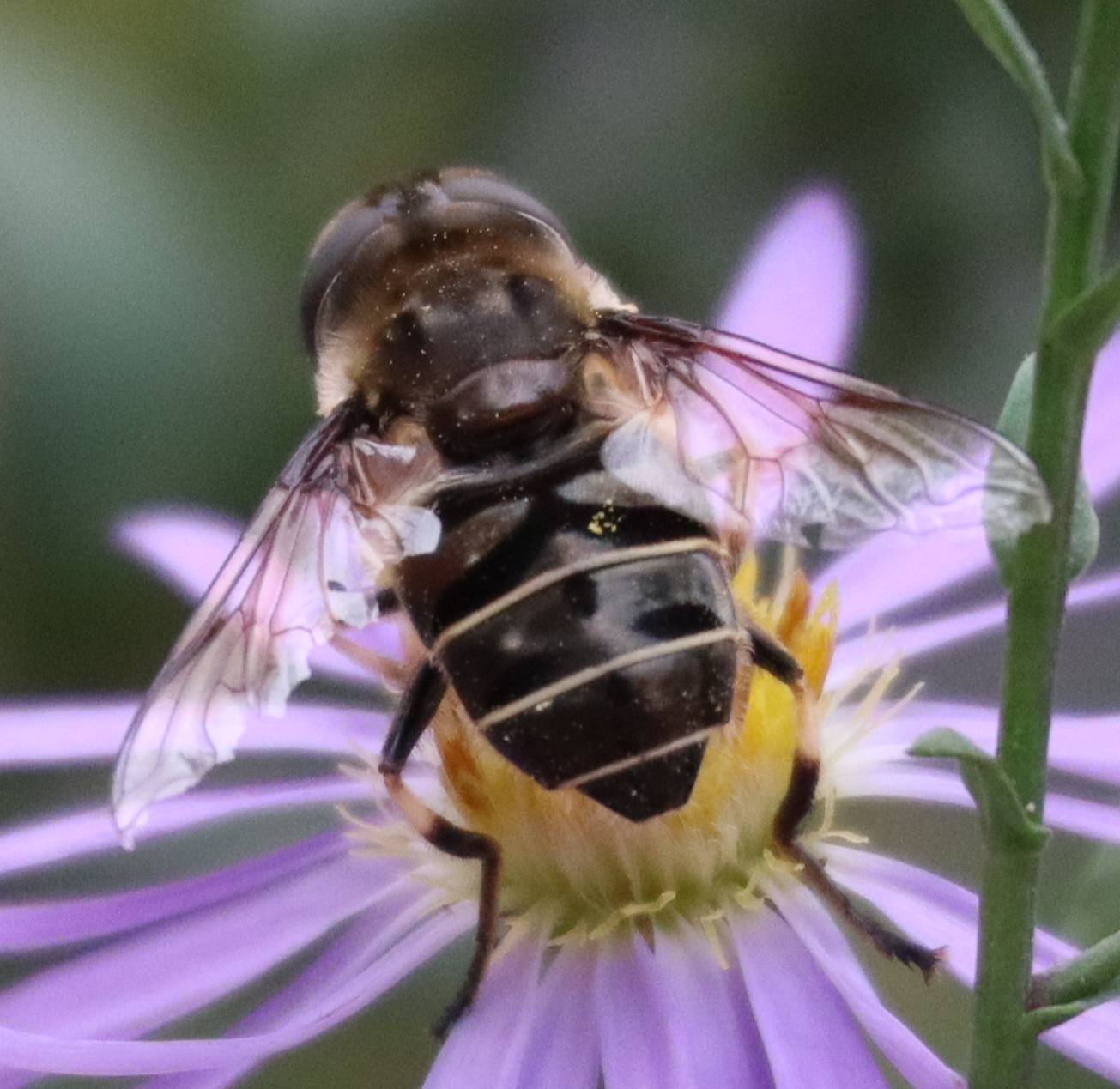
Female, showing the darkened, opaque, infuscated humeral cells on the leading edges of the wings, close to the base.

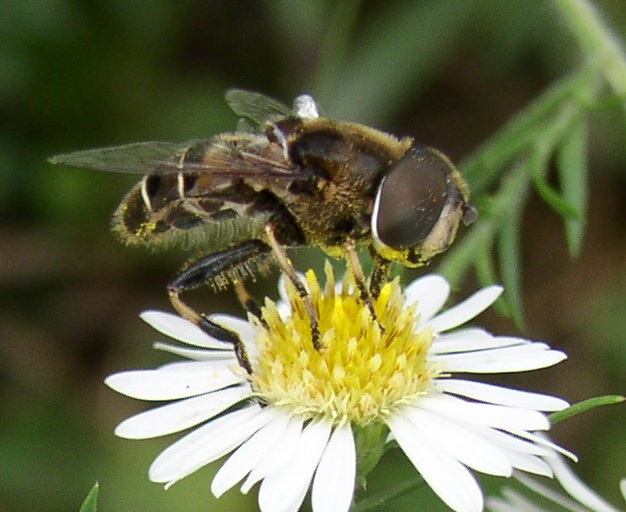
Female
