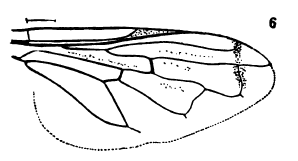
- Orthonevra bellula wing

Scientific classification
- Domain: Eukaryota
- Kingdom: Animalia
- Phylum: Arthropoda
- Class: Insecta
- Order: Diptera
- Family: Syrphidae
- Subfamily: Eristalinae
- Tribe: Brachyopini
- Genus: Orthonevra
- Species: O. bellula

Binomial name
- Orthonevra bellula (Williston, 1882)

Synonyms
- Chrysogaster bellulus Williston, 1882

= Orthonevra bellula =

Species of fly

Orthonevra bellula (Williston, 1882), the Three-lined Mucksucker, is a rare species of syrphid fly found in the Southern California Hoverflies get their names from the ability to remain nearly motionless while in flight The adults are also known as flower flies for they are commonly found around and on flowers from which they get both energy-giving nectar and protein-rich pollen. Larvae for this genus are of the rat-tailed type. O. bellula larvae have not been described.
