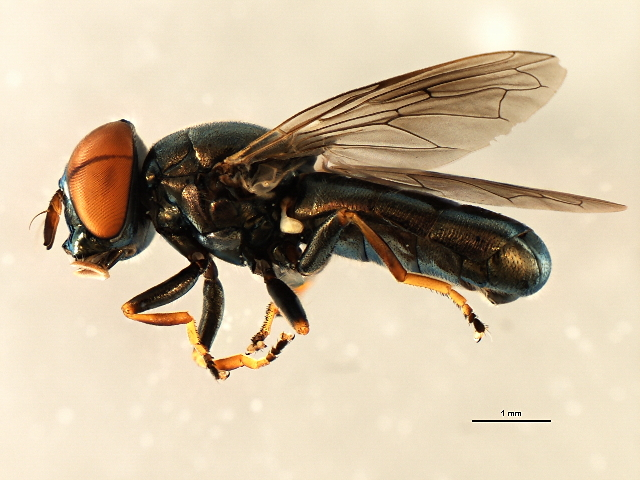
- Orthonevra anniae

Scientific classification
- Kingdom: Animalia
- Phylum: Arthropoda
- Class: Insecta
- Order: Diptera
- Family: Syrphidae
- Subfamily: Eristalinae
- Tribe: Brachyopini
- Genus: Orthonevra
- Species: O. anniae

Binomial name
- Orthonevra anniae (Sedman, 1966)

Synonyms
- Ascia globosa Walker, 1849

= Orthonevra anniae =

Species of fly

Orthonevra anniae (Sedman, 1966), the Shiny-sided mucksucker, is a rare species of syrphid fly. It has been observed in Northeastern North America. Hoverflies get their names from the ability to remain nearly motionless while in flight. The adults are also known as flower flies for they are commonly found around and on flowers, from which they get both energy-giving nectar and protein-rich pollen. Larvae for this genus are of the short tailed rat-tailed type. O. anniae larvae have not been described.
