= Orthonevra weemsi =

Scientific classification
- Kingdom: Animalia
- Phylum: Arthropoda
- Clade: Pancrustacea
- Class: Insecta
- Order: Diptera
- Family: Syrphidae
- Subfamily: Eristalinae
- Tribe: Brachyopini
- Genus: Orthonevra
- Species: O. weemsi

Binomial name
- Orthonevra weemsi Sedman, 1966

Synonyms
- Chrysogaster weemsi Sedman, 1966

Species of fly

Orthonevra weemsi, the Weems' mucksucker, is a rare species of syrphid fly. It has been observed in eastern North America. Hoverflies get their names from the ability to remain nearly motionless while in flight. The adults are also known as flower flies for they are commonly found around and on flowers, from which they get both energy-giving nectar and protein-rich pollen. Larvae for this genus are of the rat-tailed type. O. weemsi larvae have not been described.
