= Orthonevra flukei =

Scientific classification
- Domain: Eukaryota
- Kingdom: Animalia
- Phylum: Arthropoda
- Class: Insecta
- Order: Diptera
- Family: Syrphidae
- Subfamily: Eristalinae
- Tribe: Brachyopini
- Genus: Orthonevra
- Species: O. flukei

Binomial name
- Orthonevra flukei (Sedman, 1964)

Synonyms
- Chrysogaster flukei Sedman, 1964

Species of fly

Orthonevra flukei (Sedman, 1966), Fluke's Mucksucker, is an uncommon species of syrphid fly It has been observed in the Western United States. Hoverflies get their names from the ability to remain nearly motionless while in flight. The adults are also known as flower flies for they are commonly found around and on flowers from which they get both energy-giving nectar and protein-rich pollen. Larvae for this genus are of the rat-tailed type. O. flukei larvae have been described.

== Description ==
For terminology see Speight key to genera and glossary

Size
Male,4.5 mm (0.18 in), female 5.5 mm (0.22 in)

Head

The front of the head is a metallic purplish color. There is white hair present on the upper corners of the front, along with abundant white scales The upper part of the front is narrowed with a depression in the middle and distinctive grooves on the sides. The face is black with some purple and bluish reflections. There is no normal hair on the face, but scales are evenly distributed on the sides, except for a concentrated line along the eye margin. There is a broad area, without scales in the middle of the face, from the antennae to the epistoma. The cheeks are shiny black with white scales in the front and white hair in the back. The antennae are brownish, with the first segment often yellowish. The third segment is slightly longer than the second. The eyes are cream to tan with brown lines. There is a straight thin horizontal line and sinuous vertical lines ranging from two parallel brown lines to lines that merge together, creating one or more circular markings. Eyes of the male holoptic.

Thorax

The scutum, has a greenish or slightly bluish color. It is marked by four wide purplish stripes running lengthwise, as well as two narrower purplish streaks between the posterior calli and the thoracic suture. The scutum is covered in short, white hair. The scutellum, has a bluish color along the edges and a shiny purple color elsewhere.

Wings

The wings have a clouded area near the tip, where the crossvein M1 is connected to a cloud on the second longitudinal vein R_{2+3}. There are brown spots of varying intensity in the cells of the wing. The stigma, is a pale yellow color but appears darker in females. The M_{1} vein joins the R_{4+5} vein at a right angle, while the M_{2} vein divides the M1 vein into two equal parts. The CuA_{1} vein extends as a spur on the posterior corner of the discal cell. The crossvein r-m is located at the basal one-third of the discal cell. The brown wing markings on the veins forms a broad band at right angles to costa

Legs

The legs are shining black with yellow on the basal two tarsal segments and the basal quarter of the hind tibiae.

Abdomen

The sides of the abdomen have a shiny blue color on the first segment, while the remaining segments have a purplish color or may have a bluish color towards the base, with purple limited to certain parts of the outer edges. The dorsum of the abdomen appears somewhat translucent with a blue color, and segments two, three, and four may have a more or less translucent purple or bronze color towards the tip.
