= Orthonevra sonorensis =

Scientific classification
- Domain: Eukaryota
- Kingdom: Animalia
- Phylum: Arthropoda
- Class: Insecta
- Order: Diptera
- Family: Syrphidae
- Subfamily: Eristalinae
- Tribe: Brachyopini
- Genus: Orthonevra
- Species: O. sonorensis

Binomial name
- Orthonevra sonorensis (Sedman, 1964)

Species of fly

Orthonevra sonorensis, the Sonoran mucksucker, is a rare species of syrphid fly. It has been observed in New Mexico and Arizona. Hoverflies get their names from the ability to remain nearly motionless while in flight. The adults are also known as flower flies for they are commonly found around and on flowers from which they get both energy-giving nectar and protein-rich pollen. Larvae for this genus are of the rat-tailed type. O. sonorensis larvae have not been described.
