= Orthonevra robusta =

Scientific classification
- Kingdom: Animalia
- Phylum: Arthropoda
- Class: Insecta
- Order: Diptera
- Family: Syrphidae
- Subfamily: Eristalinae
- Tribe: Brachyopini
- Genus: Orthonevra
- Species: O. robusta

Binomial name
- Orthonevra robusta Shannon 1916

Synonyms
- Chrysogaster robusta Shannon, 1916

Species of fly

Orthonevra robusta, the short-horned mucksucker is a rare species of syrphid fly, located in the Western United States. It was described by Raymond Corbett Shannon in 1916. Hoverflies are able to be motionless while in flight. Syrphyid flies are also called flower flies, for they are commonly found around and on flowers from which they get both energy-giving nectar and protein-rich pollen. Larvae for this genus are of the rat-tailed type. O. robusta larvae have not been described.

== Description ==
For terms see Morphology of Diptera.

Size

Length, 7.5 mm (0.30 in)

Head

The ocellar triangle and frons are bronzy green, with conspicuous, pale brownish pile. The frons in the female is rather smooth, transversely rugose, and interrupted medianly by a very shallow longitudinal furrow. The pile of the frons is short, yellowish brown.The face is greenish black, with short white pile. In profile the face is rather gently excavated while the mouth margin reaches forward as far as antennal prominence. There is a distinct whitish pollinose band extending across to the eyes and below this. The face is broadly, faintly rugulose.The antennae are blackish, and reddish on the under side of the third joint, which is a little longer than broad. The arista is dark, very minutely pubescent and a little longer than antennae.

Thorax

The thorax has a very short, pale brownish pile. The mesonotum has two median, very faint stripes. In the female, stripes on the mesonotum are more distinct, silvery green.

Wings

Wings slightly smoky. The squamae are whitish and halteres are yellowish.

Legs

The first tarsal joint of the hind legs are somewhat swollen

Abdomen

The center of the abdomen is subopaque, shining at the sides. The hypopygium is rather large, with abundant, short, whitish pile In the female the abdomen is nearly as broad as long.

== Distribution ==
British Columbia, Manitoba, Washington, Oregon, Nebraska and California
