= Orthonevra stigmata =

Scientific classification
- Kingdom: Animalia
- Phylum: Arthropoda
- Clade: Pancrustacea
- Class: Insecta
- Order: Diptera
- Family: Syrphidae
- Subfamily: Eristalinae
- Tribe: Brachyopini
- Genus: Orthonevra
- Species: O. stigmata

Binomial name
- Orthonevra stigmata Williston,1882

Synonyms
- Chrysogaster stigmatus Williston, 1882

Species of fly

Orthonevra stigmata, the black-headed mucksucker, is a rare species of syrphid fly. It has been observed in Southern California. Hoverflies get their names from the ability to remain nearly motionless while in flight The adults are also known as flower flies, for they are commonly found around and on flowers from which they get both energy-giving nectar and protein-rich pollen. Larvae for this genus are of the rat-tailed type. O. stigmata larvae have not been described.
