= Orthonevra parva =

Scientific classification
- Kingdom: Animalia
- Phylum: Arthropoda
- Class: Insecta
- Order: Diptera
- Family: Syrphidae
- Subfamily: Eristalinae
- Tribe: Brachyopini
- Genus: Orthonevra
- Species: O. parva

Binomial name
- Orthonevra parva Shannon 1916

Synonyms
- Chrysogaster parva Shannon, 1916

Species of fly

Orthonevra parva , the copper-striped mucksucker, is a rare species of syrphid fly. It has been observed in the Western United States. Hoverflies get their names from the ability to remain nearly motionless while in flight. The adults are also known as flower flies, for they are commonly found around and on flowers from which they get both energy-giving nectar and protein rich pollen. Larvae for this genus are of the rat-tailed type. O. parva larvae have not been described.
