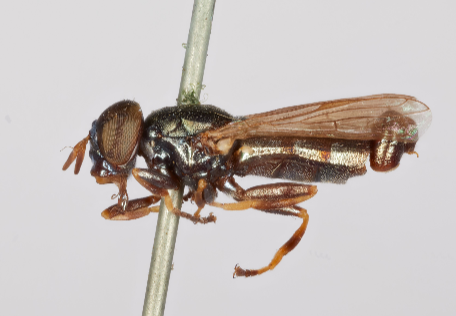
- O. pulchella (type specimen)

Scientific classification
- Domain: Eukaryota
- Kingdom: Animalia
- Phylum: Arthropoda
- Class: Insecta
- Order: Diptera
- Family: Syrphidae
- Subfamily: Eristalinae
- Tribe: Brachyopini
- Genus: Orthonevra
- Species: O. pulchella

Binomial name
- Orthonevra pulchella (Williston, 1887)
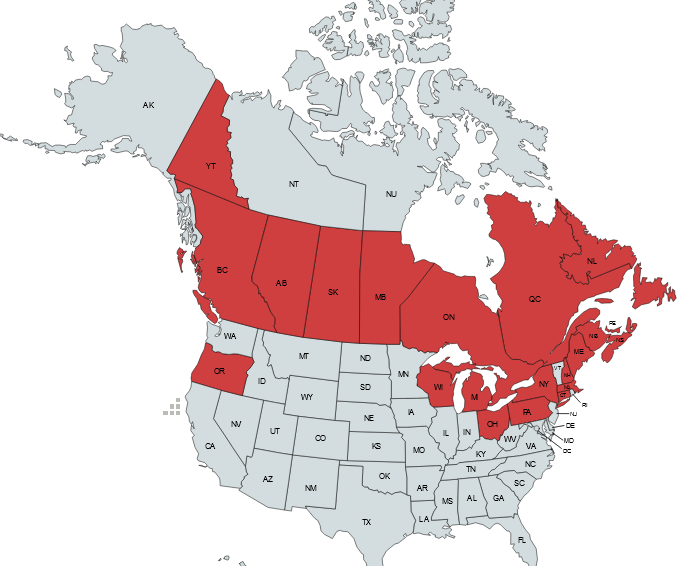
- Distribution map as of 2023

Synonyms
- Chrysogaster pulchella Williston, 1887

= Orthonevra pulchella =

Species of fly

Orthonevra pulchella (Williston 1887) the Dusky Mucksucker is a fairly common species of syrphid fly. It has been observed from across northern North America (see map). Hoverflies get their names from the ability to remain nearly motionless while in flight. The adults are also known as flower flies for they are commonly found around and on flowers, from which they get both energy-giving nectar and protein-rich pollen. Larvae for this genus are of the rat-tailed type. O. pulchella larvae have not been described.
