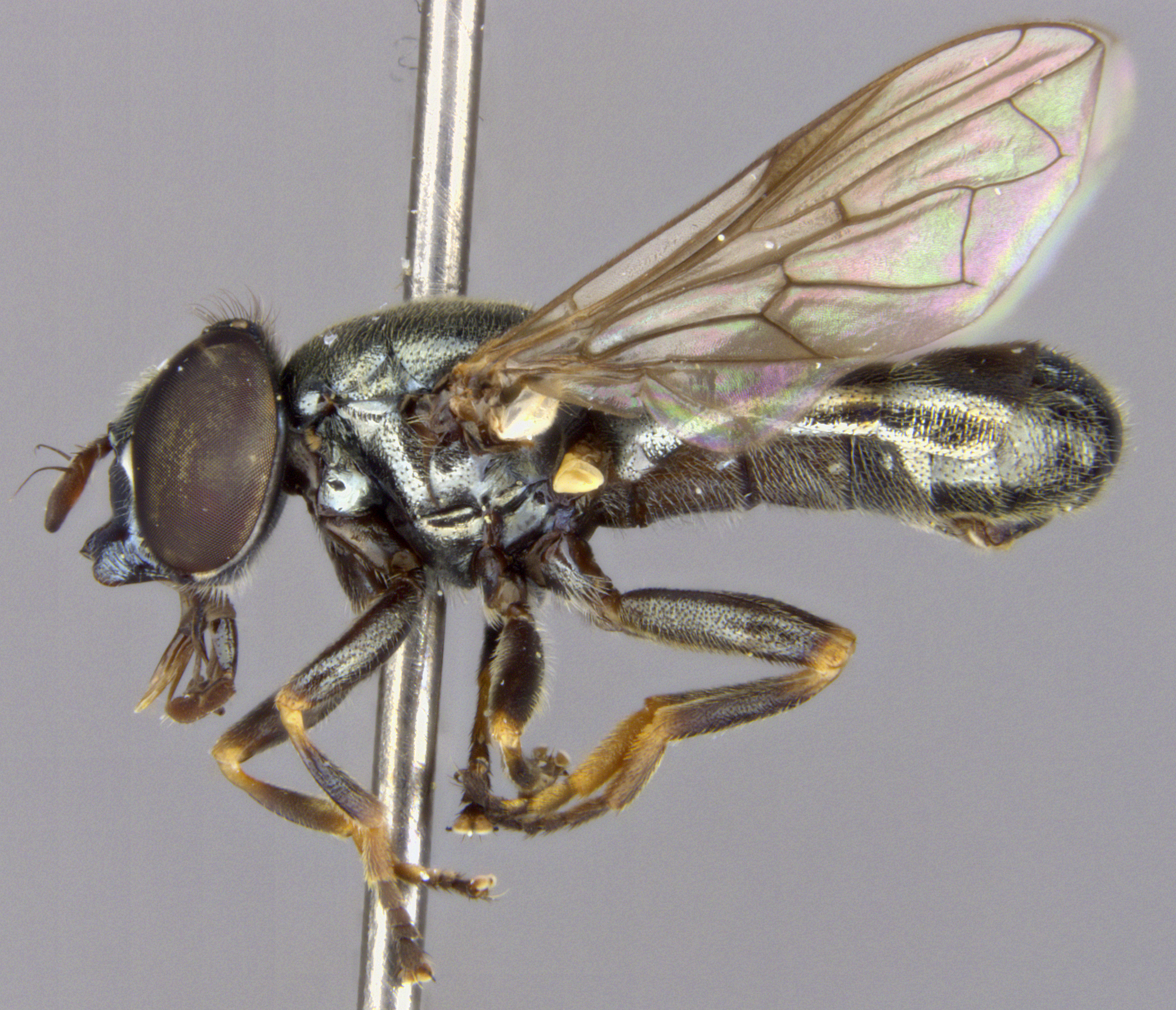
- lateral male

Scientific classification
- Kingdom: Animalia
- Phylum: Arthropoda
- Class: Insecta
- Order: Diptera
- Family: Syrphidae
- Subfamily: Eristalinae
- Tribe: Brachyopini
- Genus: Orthonevra
- Species: O. feei

Binomial name
- Orthonevra feei Moran & Skevington, 2019

= Orthonevra feei =

Species of fly

Orthonevra feei, Fee's mucksucker, is a rare species of syrphid fly. It has been observed only in New Hampshire, United States. Hoverflies get their names from the ability to remain nearly motionless while in flight. The adults are also known as flower flies, for they are commonly found around and on flowers from which they get both energy-giving nectar and protein-rich pollen. Larvae for this genus are of the rat-tailed type. O. feei larvae have not been described.
