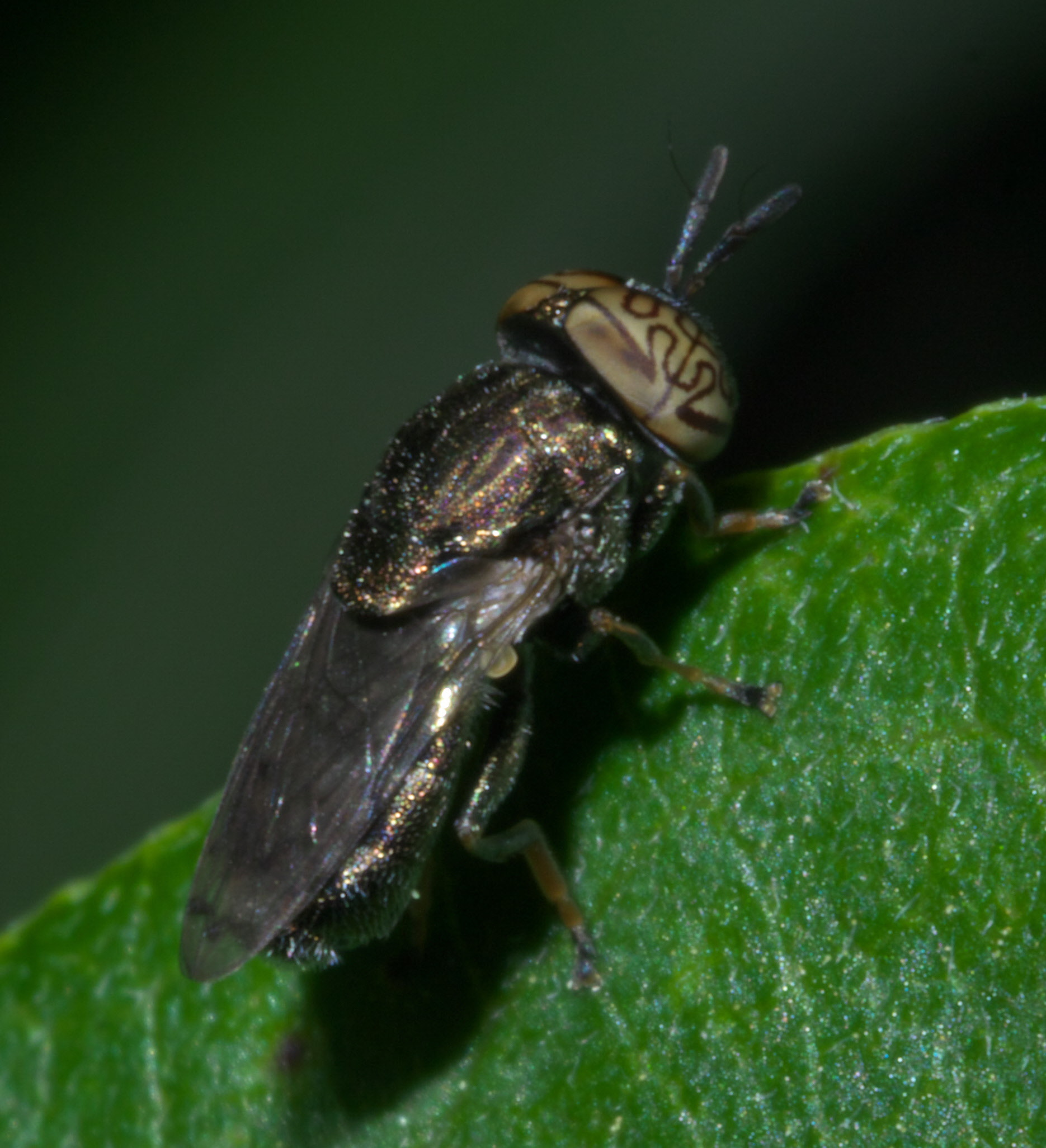

Scientific classification
- Kingdom: Animalia
- Phylum: Arthropoda
- Class: Insecta
- Order: Diptera
- Family: Syrphidae
- Genus: Orthonevra
- Species: O. nitida

Binomial name
- Orthonevra nitida (Weidemann, 1830)
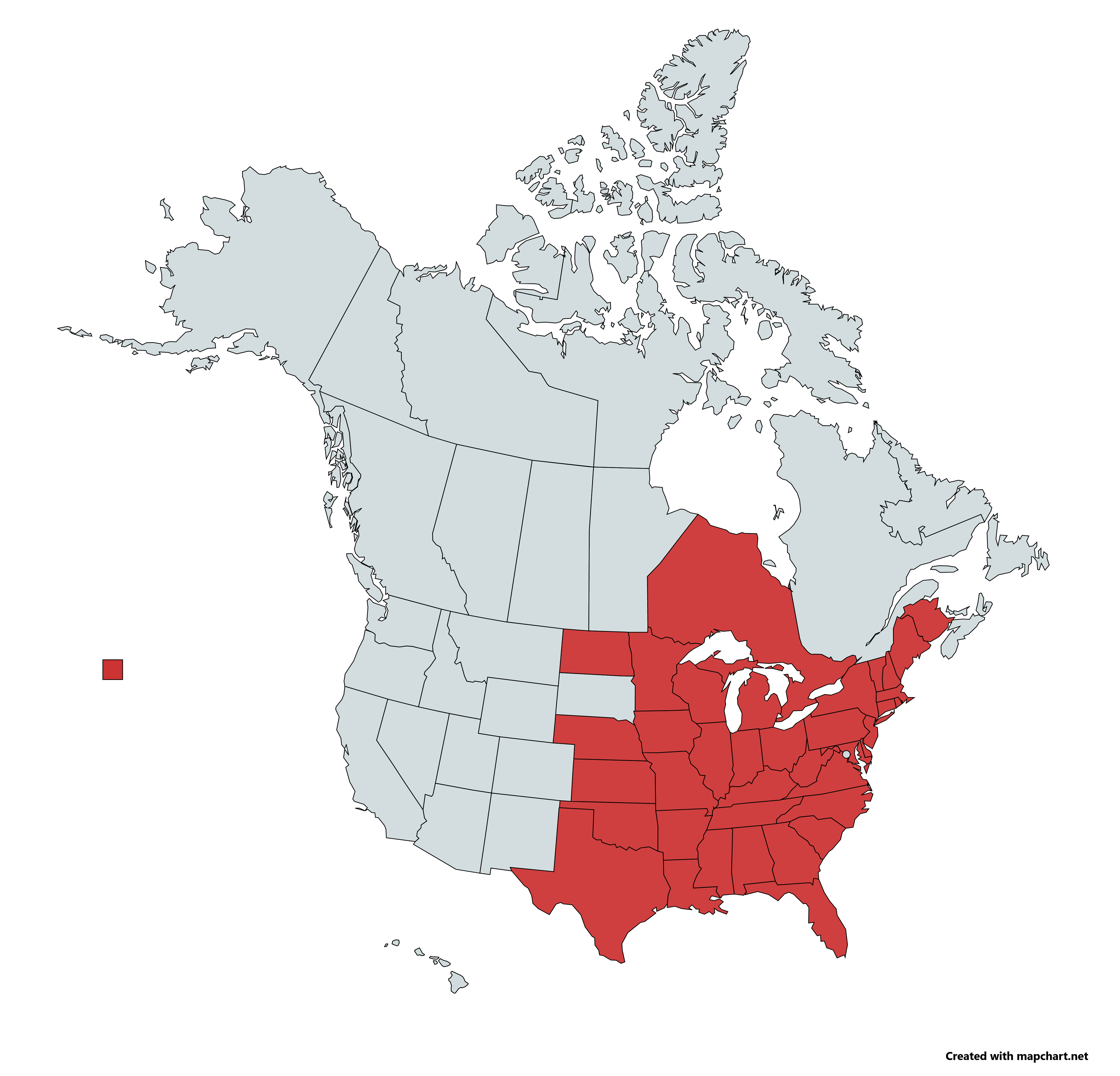
- Distribution as of 2023

Synonyms
- Chrysogaster nitidus Wiedemann, 1830; Cryptineura hieroglyphica Bigot, 1859

= Orthonevra nitida =

Species of fly

Orthonevra nitida , the wavy mucksucker, is a fairly common species of syrphid fly. It has been observed in Eastern and Central North America. Hoverflies get their names from the ability to remain nearly motionless while in flight. The adults are also known as flower flies for they are commonly found around and on flowers from which they get both energy-giving nectar and protein rich pollen. Larvae for this genus are of the rat-tailed type. O. nitida larvae have not been described.

== Description ==
For terminology see Speight key to genera and glossary

Size
4–5 mm (0.16–0.20 in)
Head

The head is brassy metallic black and covered with scale-like pile. The front in female narrow above, strongly transversely rugose, with a median furrowed longitudinal line. The frontal triangle (male) is rugose. The face is rugose, concave on the lower part. The epistoma is but slightly produced. There is a small silvery spot on each side of the face near the eye above. The antennae are longer than the face with the scape and pedicel are yellowish red or brownish, the flagellum is black and only a little longer than the pedicel. The eyes with a median straight horizontal line and two prominent recurving vertical brown lines. The eyes of the male are Holoptic

Thorax

The scutum is metallic green, finely roughened, with four longitudinal stripes of a coppery or metallic purple color, in some reflections brown. The outer stripes are more or less divided into two nearly contiguous ones. The scutellum is more distinctly roughened, or lightly rugose and grooved before the apex.

Wings

The wings are almost transparent, with thin blackish spots on the outer cells. The stigma is a light brown color. There is a narrow brown cloud that starts from the tip of the second vein (R_{2+3}) and extends across the submarginal cell. The cross veins are narrowly clouded with brown. The veins at the outer part of the discal and first posterior cells are rectangular, almost straight, slightly angled in the middle. The fourth vein (M) terminates noticeably beyond the tip of the second vein. The M_{1} vein is perpendicular to the R_{4+5} vein. The M_{2} vein divides the M_{1} vein into two equal parts. The dm-cu vein is curved inward, and the CuA1 vein extends as a spur on the posterior corner of the discal cell. The crossvein r-m is located at the basal one-third of the discal cell.

Legs

The legs are metallic black with the joints, the base of tibiae and their tip, and the first two joints of tarsi, reddish yellow.

Abdomen

The abdomen has a deep metallic green color. It appears roughened and lacks shine on the central area, but is noticeably shiny on the edges and tip. The second and third segments of the abdomen have somewhat noticeable bands of a less translucent color in front and behind.

== Gallery ==
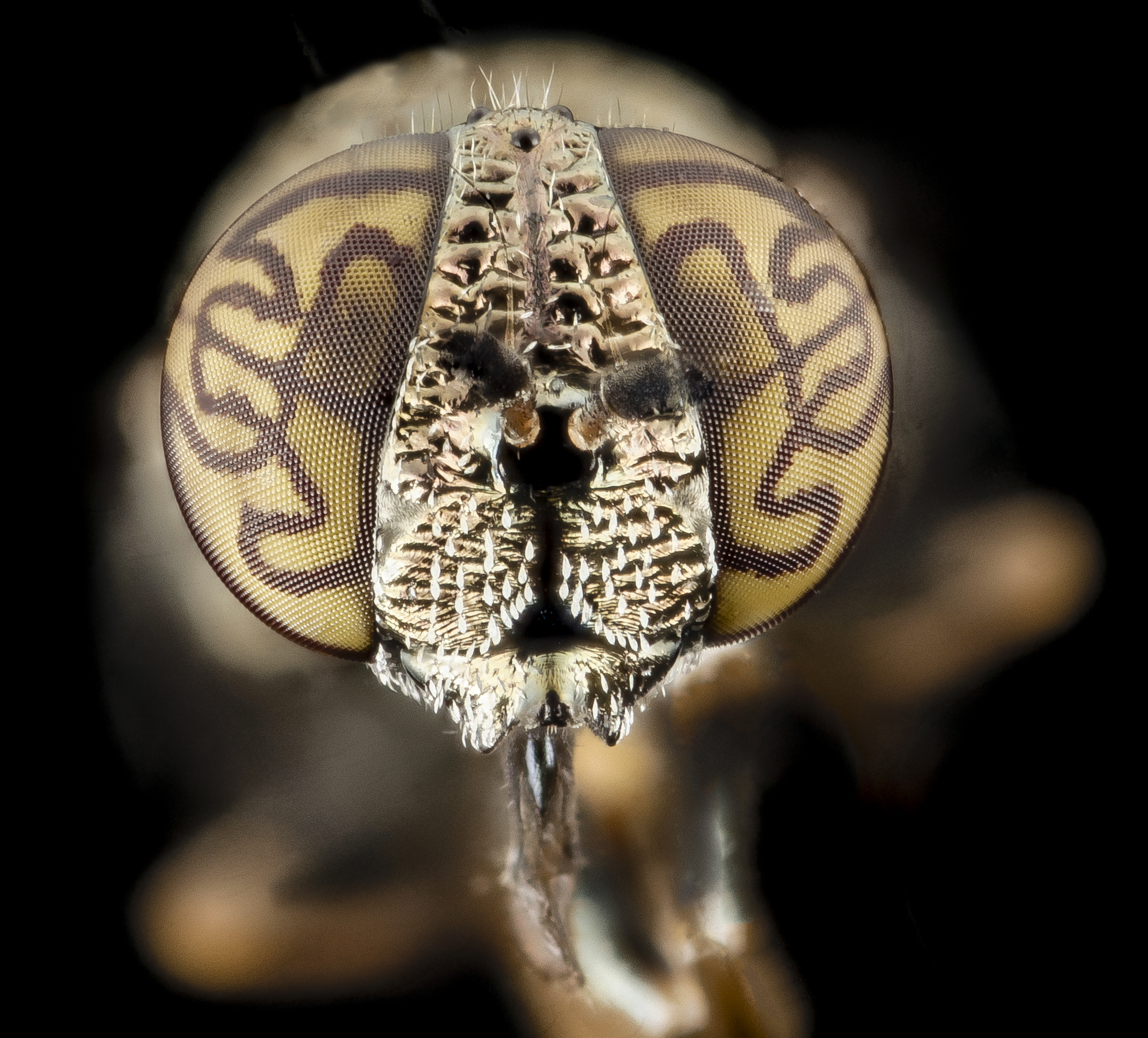
Head

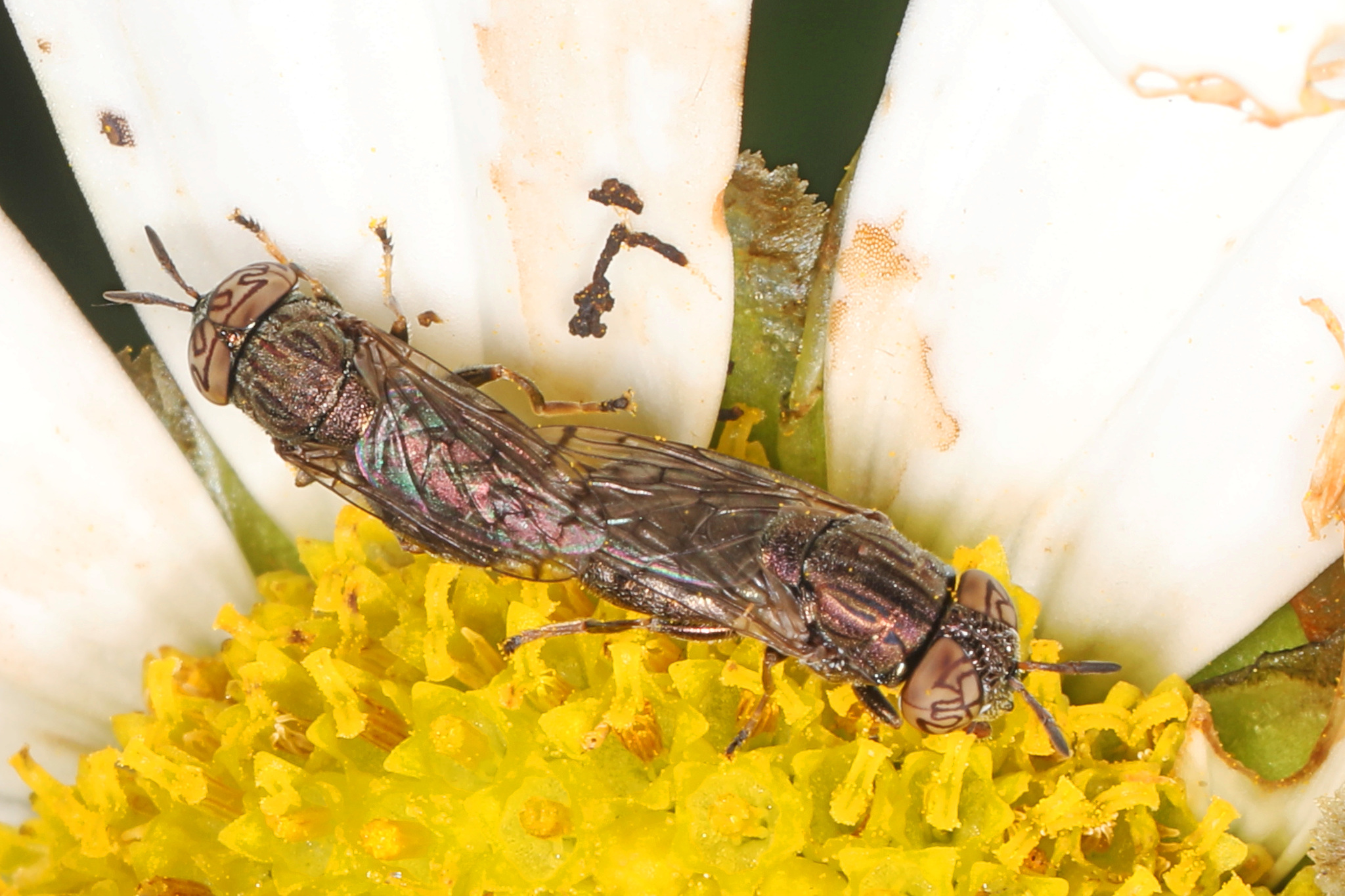
male and female

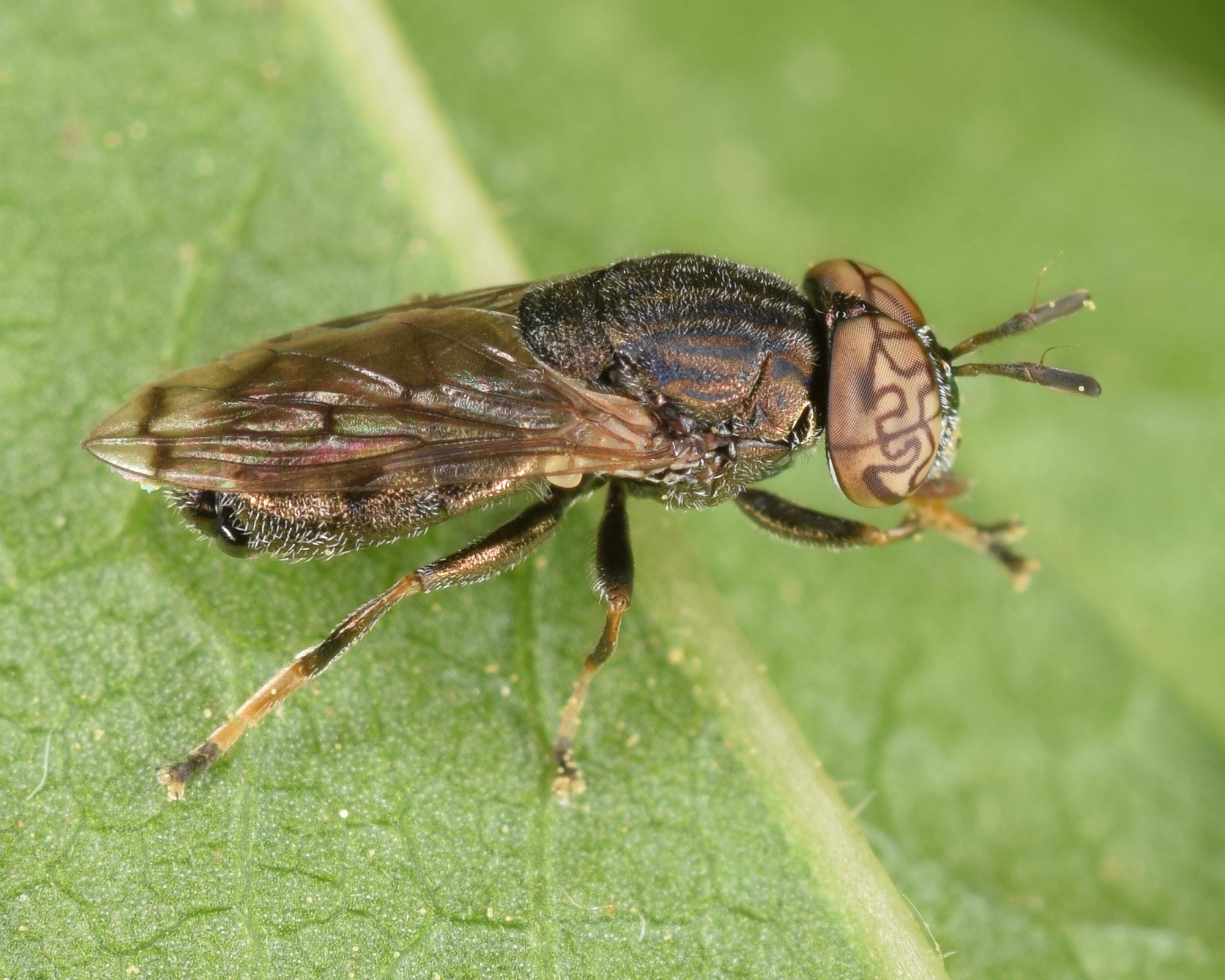
Lateral view

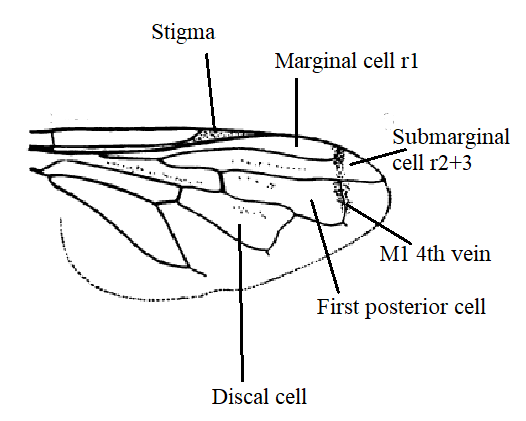
Orthonevra sp. wing diagram

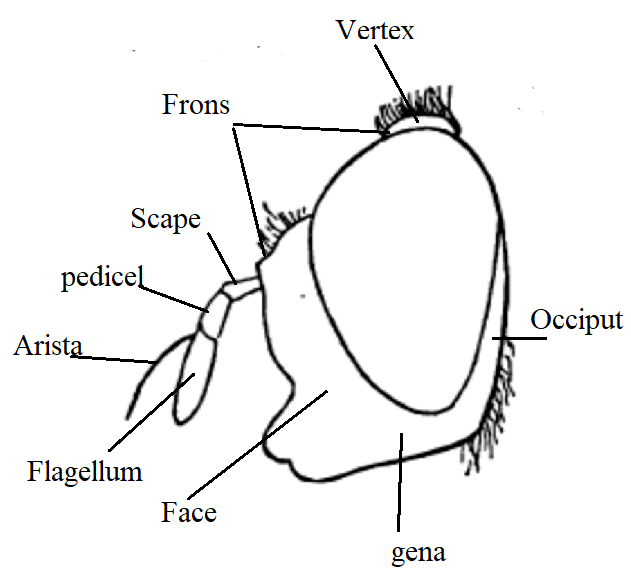
Orthonevra sp. head diagram
