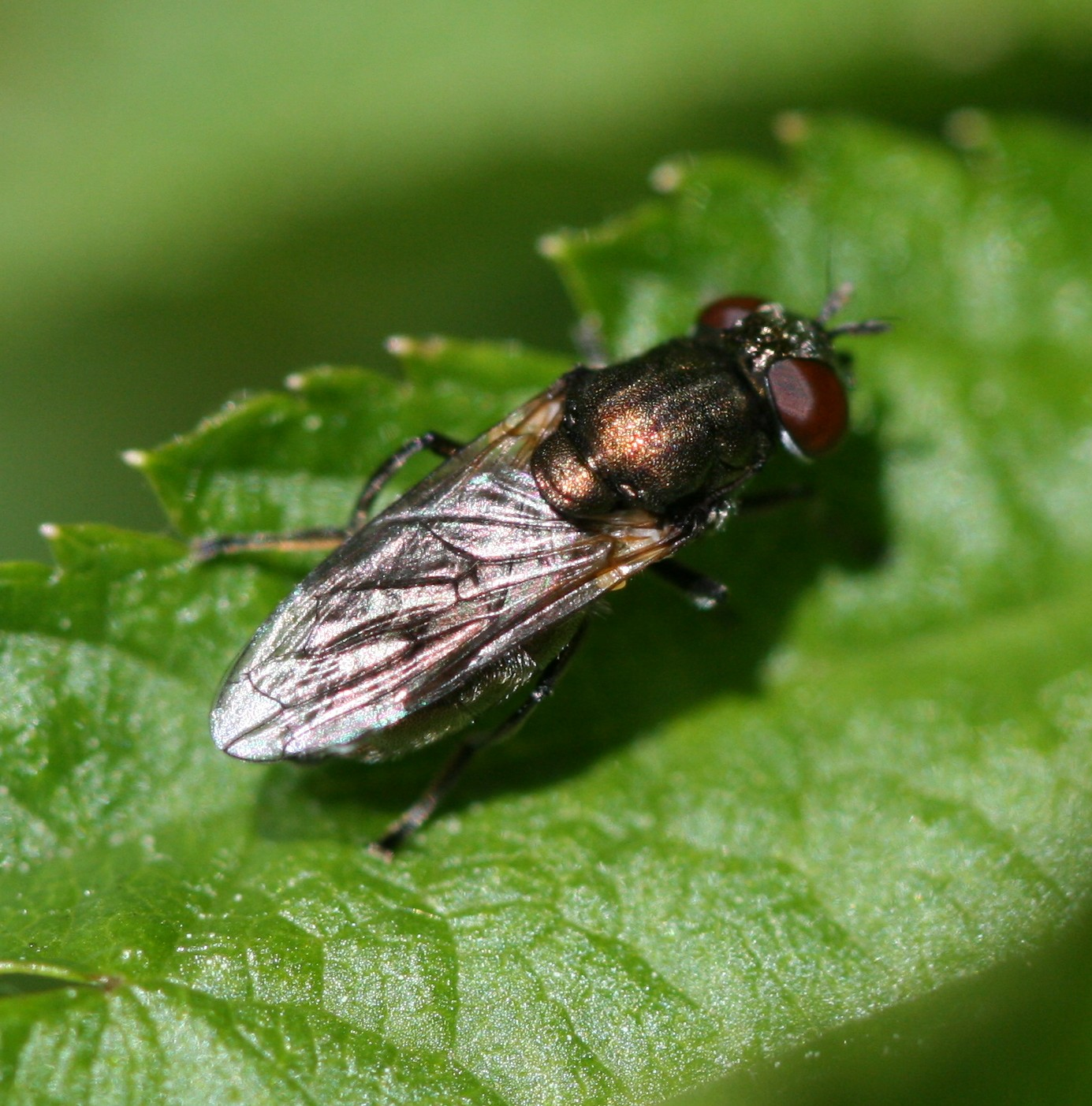
- Female

Scientific classification
- Kingdom: Animalia
- Phylum: Arthropoda
- Class: Insecta
- Order: Diptera
- Family: Syrphidae
- Genus: Orthonevra
- Species: O. nobilis

Binomial name
- Orthonevra nobilis (Fallén, 1817)

Synonyms
- Eristalis nobilis Fallén, 1817; Orthonevra elegans Verrall, 1901; Orthonevra splendida Walker, 1851

= Orthonevra nobilis =

Species of fly

Orthonevra nobilis is a species of hoverfly.

== Description ==
External images For terms see Morphology of Diptera
Wing length 4-5 ·75 mm. White marks on face extend narrowly downwards. Pterostigm dark brown or black. Antennomere 3 pointed Female tergite 5 with a small incision at hind margin. van der Goot (1981) figures the male genitalia. The larva is described and figured by Maibach and Goeldlin (1994).

See references for determination.

== Distribution ==
Palearctic Range: Central Fennoscandia, South to Central Spain. Ireland, East North Europe and Central Europe and North Italy. East into Yugoslavia, Greece and Turkey European Russia and the Caucasus, the Russian Far East, Siberia and North China.

== Biology ==
Habitat: Streams in Fagus woodland, riparian gallery forest, springs and flushes in fen and raised bog. Flowers visited include white umbellifers, Fragaria, Galium, Potentilla erecta, Ranunculus. The flight period is May/ to August.The larva is associated with springs and flushes, where it occurs in wet, organically-enriched mud.
