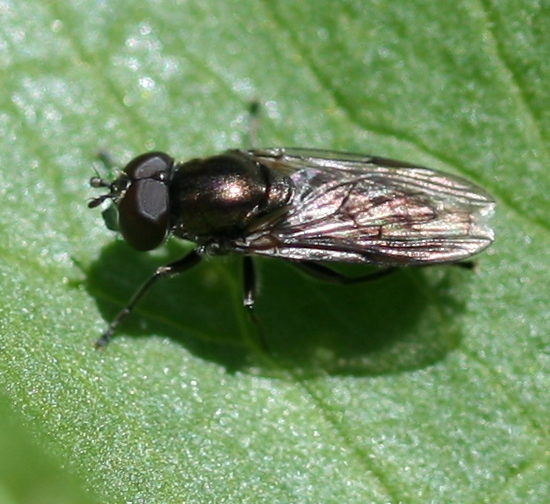
- Orthonevra brevicornis male

Scientific classification
- Kingdom: Animalia
- Phylum: Arthropoda
- Class: Insecta
- Order: Diptera
- Family: Syrphidae
- Genus: Orthonevra
- Species: O. brevicornis

Binomial name
- Orthonevra brevicornis Loew, 1843

= Orthonevra brevicornis =

Species of fly

Orthonevra brevicornis is a species of hoverfly.
