= Orthonevra elegans =

Scientific classification
- Kingdom: Animalia
- Phylum: Arthropoda
- Class: Insecta
- Order: Diptera
- Family: Syrphidae
- Genus: Orthonevra
- Species: O. elegans

Binomial name
- Orthonevra elegans (Meigen, 1822)

Synonyms
- Chrysogaster elegans Meigen, 1822

Species of fly

Orthonevra elegans is a species of small hoverflies in the subfamily Eristalinae. It is found in Europe and Asia.
