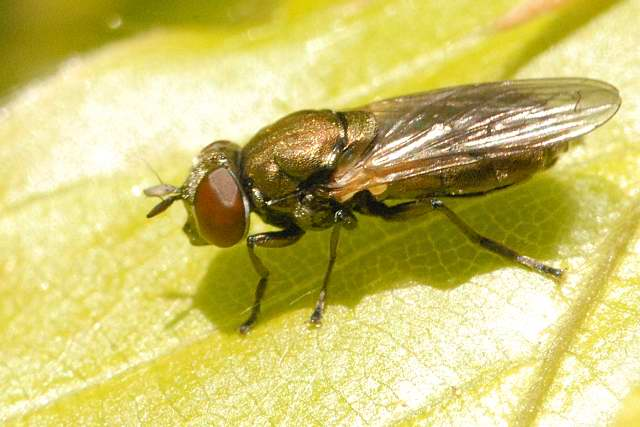
- Orthonevra geniculata

Scientific classification
- Kingdom: Animalia
- Phylum: Arthropoda
- Class: Insecta
- Order: Diptera
- Family: Syrphidae
- Subfamily: Eristalinae
- Tribe: Brachyopini
- Genus: Orthonevra; Macquart, 1829

Type species
- Chrysogaster elegans Meigen, 1822

Synonyms
- Orthoneura Loew, 1843

= Orthonevra =

Genus of flies

Orthonevra is a genus of flies in the family Syrphidae. They are worldwide in distribution with at least 59 species identified concentrated mainly in eastern North America and Europe. Species of the genus Orthonevra are commonly called mucksuckers after the larvae which have been found in organic rich mud, i.e. muck. This genus belongs to the tribe Brachyopini that includes the prominent genera Melanogaster, Brachyopa, Neoascia and Sphegina.

== Description ==
Species of the genus Orthonevra have black heads with blue to purple reflections. Many species have distinctive eye stripes. The antennae are somewhat elongate. (see image) The frons is wrinkled with silvery spots at sides of antennae. The thorax with small punctures dorsally and in several species the body is covered with scale-like pile. Wing vein M1 curves away from the wing tip.(see images)

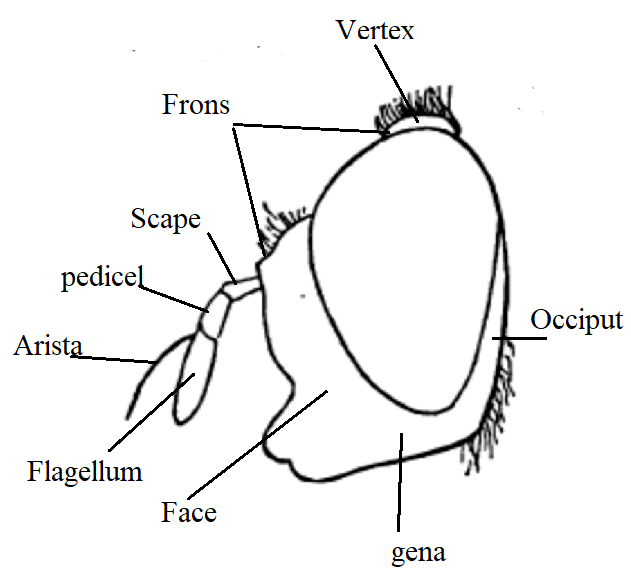
head diagram

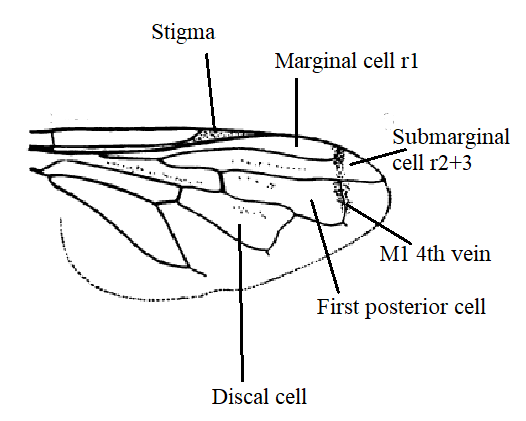
wing

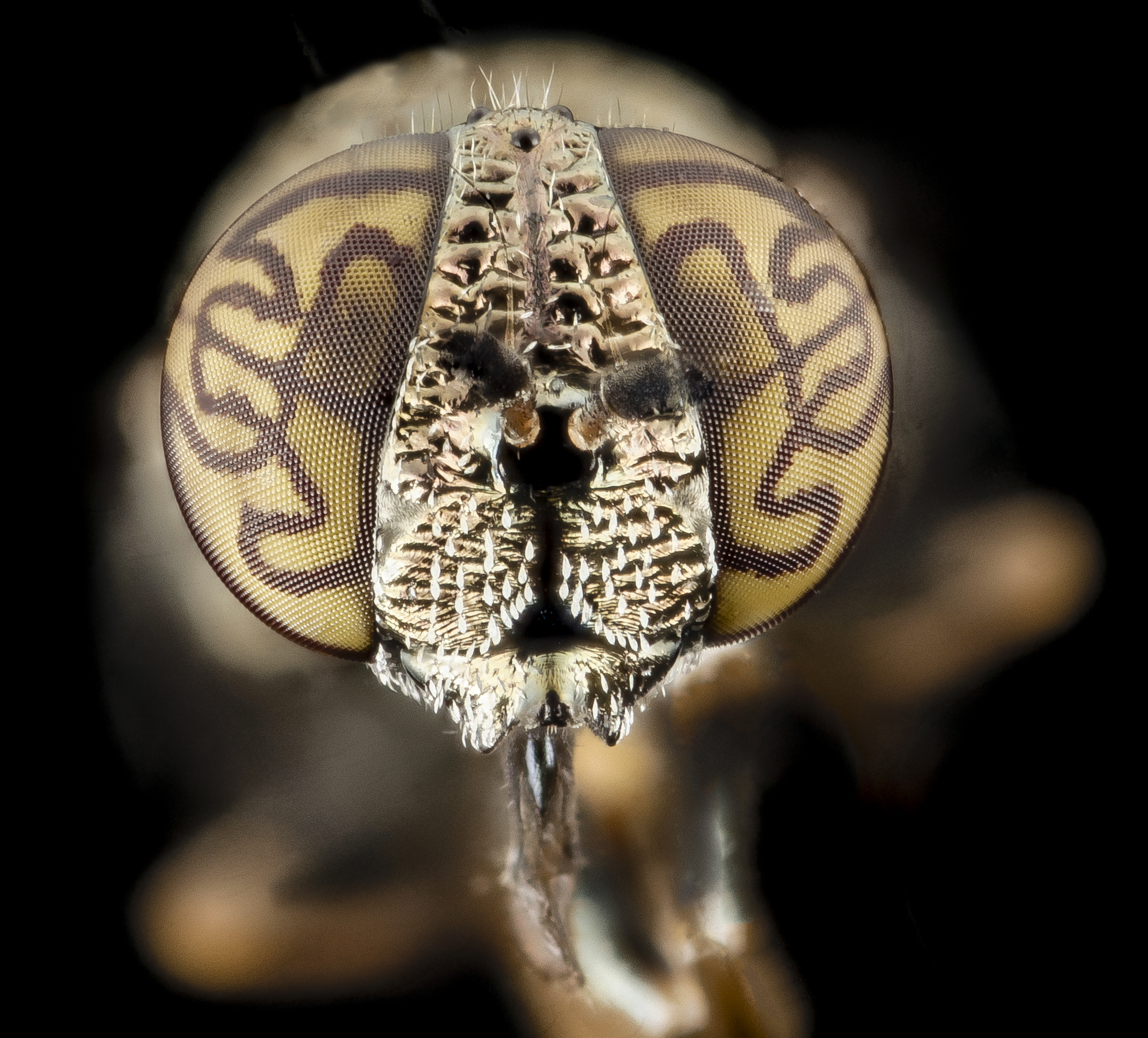
eye markings and scales

== Guides ==
Seman reviewed North American species as of 1964

The most comprehensive of existing keys to European Orthonevra species is that of van Veen (2004), M.C.D.Speight has also documented European species.

== Species ==
- Orthonevra aenethorax Kohli, Kapoor & Gupta, 1988
- Orthonevra anniae (Sedman, 1966)
- Orthonevra argentina (Brèthes, 1922)
- Orthonevra auritarsis Brădescu, 1992
- Orthonevra bellula (Williston, 1882)
- Orthonevra brevicornis (Loew, 1843)
- Orthonevra ceratura (Stackelberg, 1952)
- Orthonevra chilensis (Thompson, 1999)
- Orthonevra elegans (Meigen, 1822)
- Orthonevra erythrogona (Malm, 1863)
- Orthonevra feei (Moran and Skevington, 2019)
- Orthonevra flukei (Sedman, 1964)
- Orthonevra frontalis (Loew, 1843)
- Orthonevra gemmula (Violovitsh, 1979)
- Orthonevra geniculata (Meigen, 1830)
- Orthonevra gewgaw (Hull, 1941)
- Orthonevra incisa (Loew, 1843)
- Orthonevra intermedia (Lundbeck, 1916)
- Orthonevra inundata (Violovitsh, 1979)
- Orthonevra karumaiensis (Matsumura, 1916)
- Orthonevra kozlovi (Stackelberg, 1952)
- Orthonevra labyrinthops (Hull, 1944j)
- Orthonevra minuta (Hull, 1945)
- Orthonevra montana Vujić, 1999
- Orthonevra neotropica (Shannon, 1925a)
- Orthonevra nigrovittata (Loew, 1876)
- Orthonevra nitida (Wiedemann, 1830)
- Orthonevra nitidula (Curran, 1925)
- Orthonevra nobilis (Fallén, 1817)
- Orthonevra onytes (Séguy, 1961)
- Orthonevra parva (Shannon, 1916)
- Orthonevra pictipennis (Loew, 1863)
- Orthonevra plumbago (Loew, 1840)
- Orthonevra pulchella (Williston, 1887)
- Orthonevra quadristriata (Shannon & Aubertin, 1933)
- Orthonevra robusta (Shannon, 1916)
- Orthonevra sachalinensis (Violovitsh, 1956)
- Orthonevra shannoni (Curran, 1925a)
- Orthonevra shusteri Brădescu, 1993
- Orthonevra sinuosa (Bigot, 1884)
- Orthonevra sonorensis (Shannon, 1964)
- Orthonevra stackelbergi Thompson & Torp, 1982
- Orthonevra stigmata (Williston, 1882)
- Orthonevra subincisa (Violovitsh, 1979)
- Orthonevra tristis (Loew, 1871)
- Orthonevra unicolor (Shannon, 1916)
- Orthonevra vagabunda (Violovitsh, 1979)
- Orthonevra varga (Violovitsh, 1979)
- Orthonevra weemsi (Sedman, 1966)
