= Orthonevra chilensis =

Scientific classification
- Kingdom: Animalia
- Phylum: Arthropoda
- Class: Insecta
- Order: Diptera
- Family: Syrphidae
- Genus: Orthonevra
- Species: O. chilensis

Binomial name
- Orthonevra chilensis Thompson, 1999

Species of fly

Orthonevra chilensis is a species of hoverfly first found in Chile.
