= Rat-tailed maggot =

Larvae of hoverflies in the tribes Eristalini and Sericomyiini

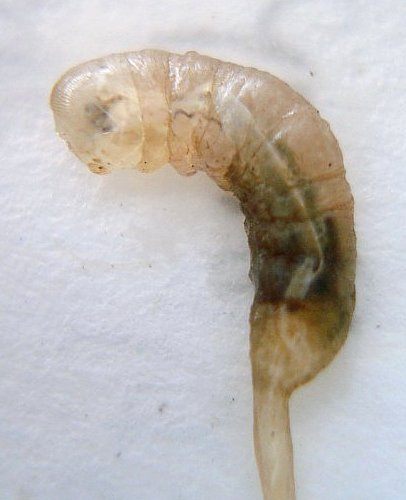
Eristalis tenax larva

Rat-tailed maggots are the larvae of certain species of hoverflies belonging to the tribes Eristalini and Sericomyiini. A characteristic feature of rat-tailed maggots is a tube-like, telescoping breathing siphon located at their posterior end. This acts like a snorkel, allowing the larva to breathe air while submerged. The siphon is usually about as long as the maggot's body (20 mm (1 in) when mature), but can be extended up to about 150 mm (6 in). This organ gives the larva its common name.

The most commonly encountered rat-tailed maggot is the larva of the drone fly, Eristalis tenax. It lives in stagnant, oxygen-deprived water, with a high organic content. It is fairly tolerant of pollution and can live in sewage lagoons and cesspools.

== Commercial use ==
These larvae, commonly called "mousies", are cultured and sold as fish bait. They are especially popular in ice fishing.

== Infection ==
Occasionally, cases have been documented of human intestinal myiasis caused by the rat-tailed maggot. Symptoms can range from none (asymptomatic) to abdominal pain, nausea and vomiting, or pruritus ani. Infection can be caused by ingestion of contaminated food or water, but doubts have been expressed that accidentally ingested fly larvae could survive in the gastrointestinal tract. Zumpt proposed an alternative called "rectal myiasis". Flies, attracted to feces, may deposit their eggs or larvae near or into the anus, and the larvae then penetrate further into the rectum. They can survive feeding on feces at this site, as long as the breathing tube reaches towards the anus.

== Gallery ==
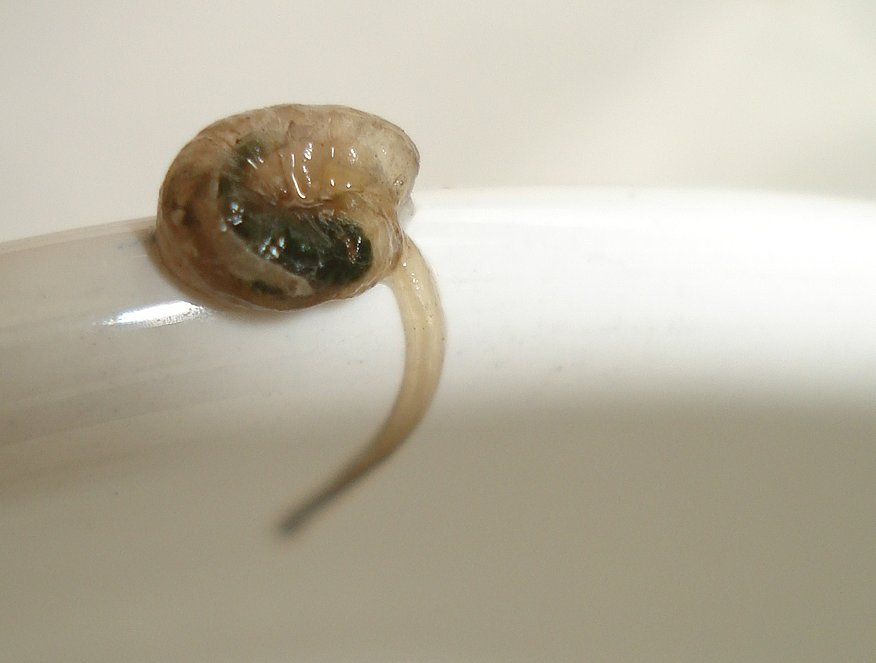
Eristalis tenax larva

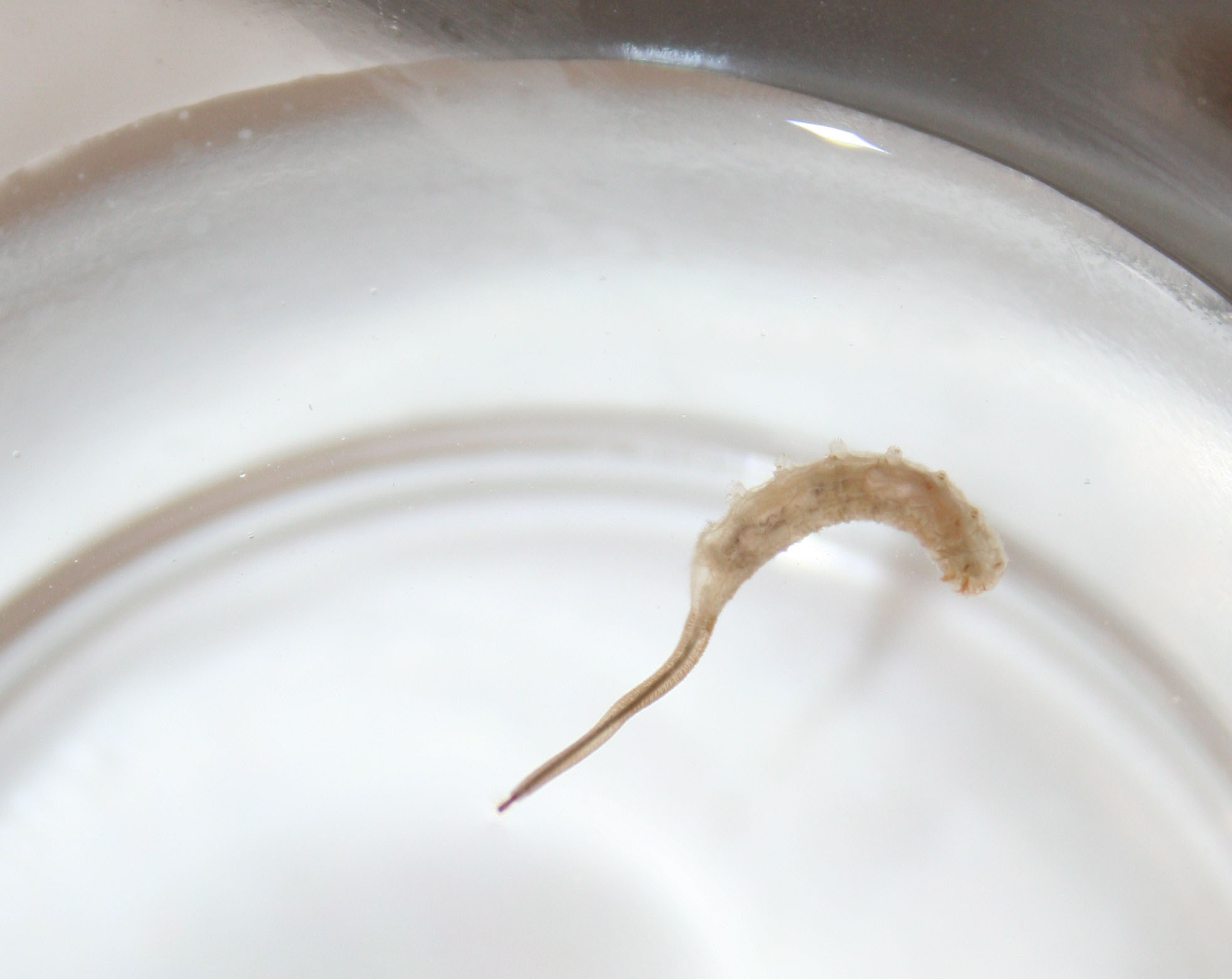
E. tenax larva

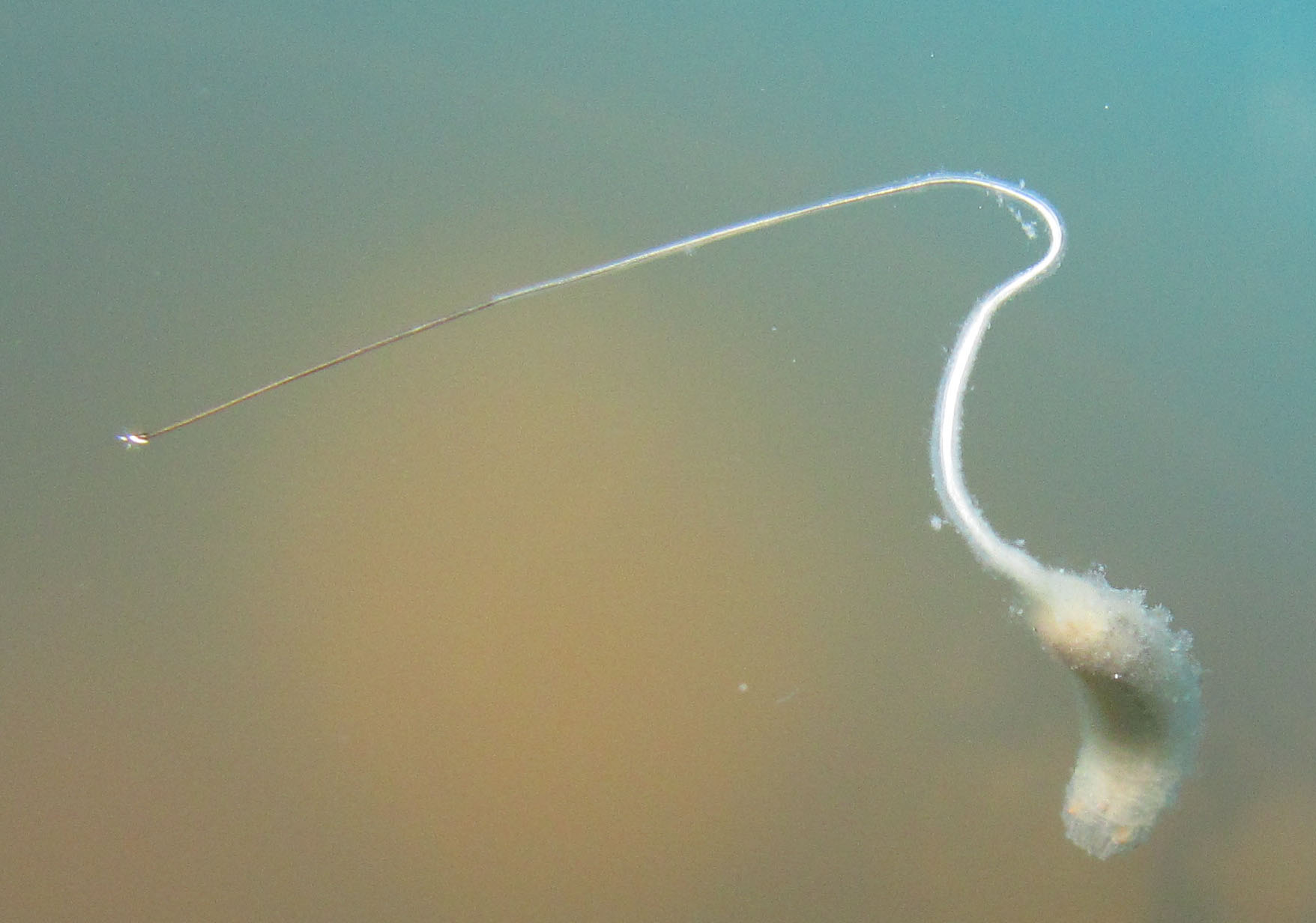
Unidentified rat-tailed maggot from Australia

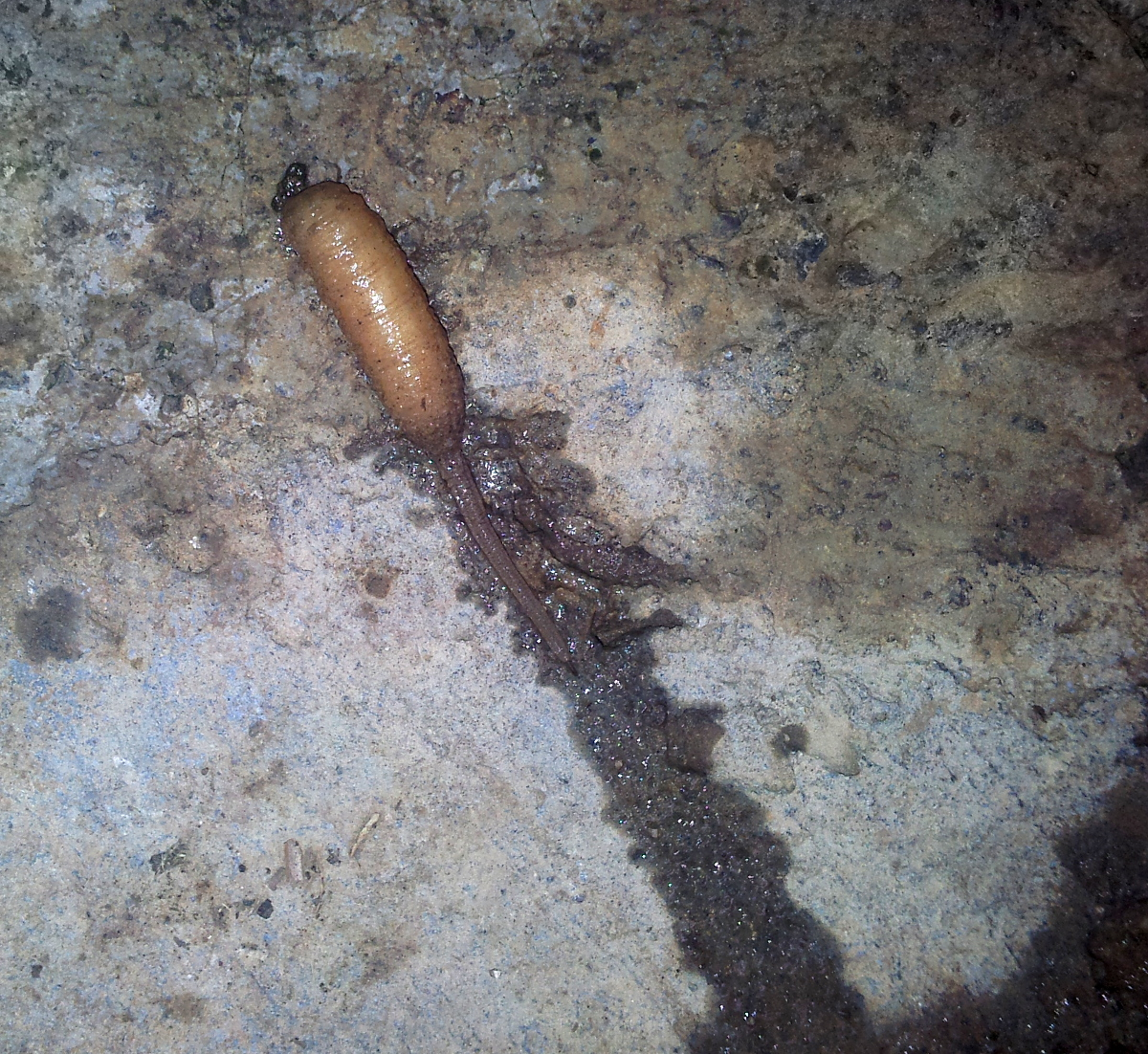
Unidentified rat-tailed maggot from the Philippines
