= Palynivore =

Pollen-eating animal

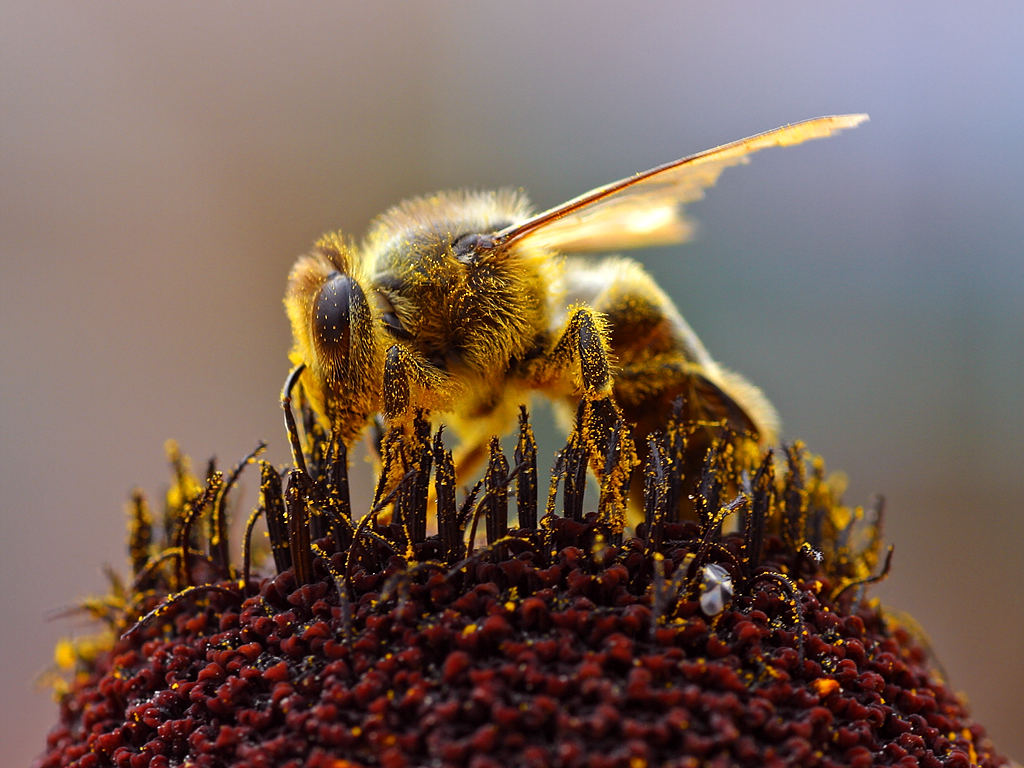
A honeybee collecting pollen from a flower

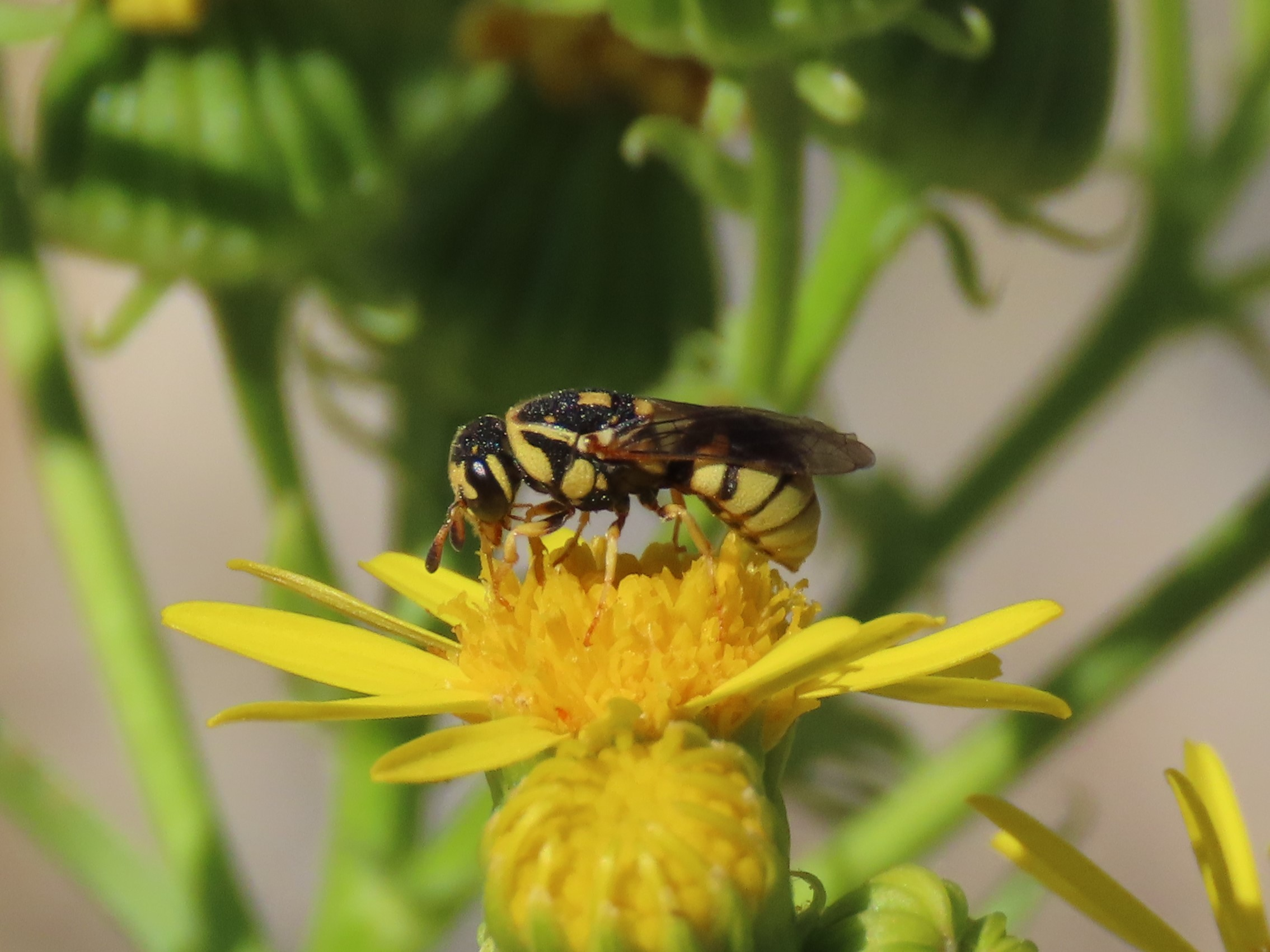
A pollen wasp (Jugurtia dispar), a type of wasp that exclusively feeds its larvae pollen. This is an example of a palynivore that is only a palynivore for part of its life span, as the adults of the species do not consume pollen

In zoology, a palynivore /pəˈlɪnəvɔːɹ/, meaning "pollen eater" (from Greek παλύνω palunō, "strew, sprinkle", and Latin, vorare, meaning "to devour") is an herbivorous animal which selectively eats the nutrient-rich pollen produced by angiosperms and gymnosperms. Most true palynivores are insects or mites. The category in its strictest application includes most bees, and a few kinds of wasps, as pollen is often the only solid food consumed by all life stages in these insects. However, the category can be extended to include more diverse species. For example, palynivorous mites and thrips typically feed on the liquid content of the pollen grains without actually consuming the exine, or the solid portion of the grain. Additionally, the list is expanded greatly if one takes into consideration species where either the larval or adult stage feeds on pollen, but not both. There are other wasps which are in this category, as well as many beetles, flies, butterflies, and moths. One such example of a bee species that only consumes pollen in its larval stage is the Apis mellifera carnica. There is a vast array of insects that will feed opportunistically on pollen, as will various birds, orb-weaving spiders and other nectarivores.

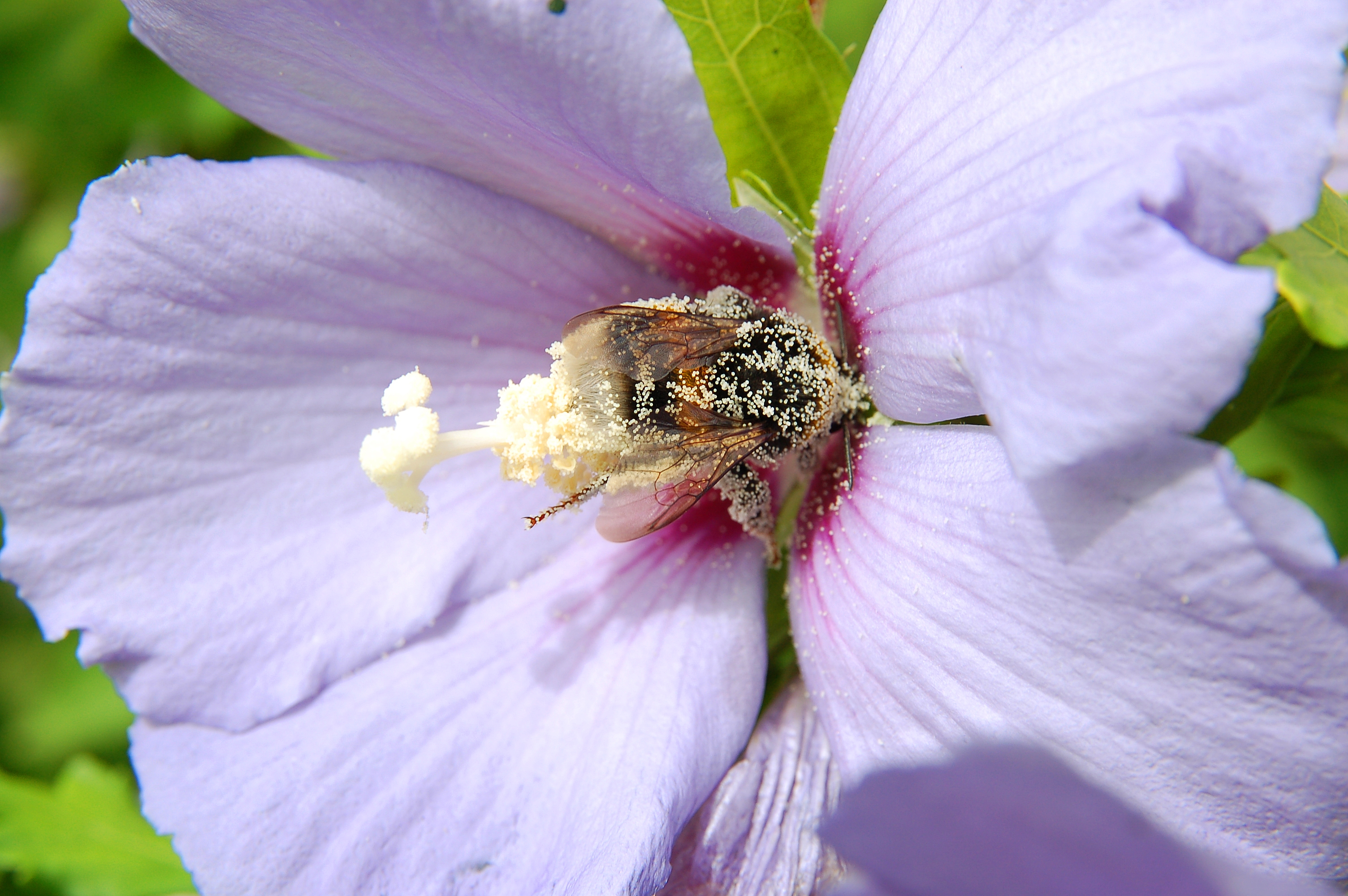
Pollen consumption of the Hibiscus syriacus plant by the Bombus ruderatus (large garden bumblebee)

Pollen, the essential component of the palynivore diet, is a male gametophyte that is formed in the anther, or the male part of the flower. Pollen is needed to fertilize the female part of the flower, or gynoecium, and has a long history of consumption by various species. There is evidence that suggests palynivory dates back to at least the Permian period. It is likely that a coevolution has occurred between plants and palynivores in a form of mutualism, or the process by which two species individually benefit from the activity of the other. For example, palynivores benefit by receiving nutrients from the pollen, and thus the structure of the palynivore eye evolved to better interpret visual cues given by the pollen. Pollen benefits from the animal-plant interaction by being spread as the animal carries it from flower to flower, furthering the reproductive success of its respective flower. Thus, pollen has evolved to be more visually appealing to palynivores, and changed its surface texture to be more readily recognized by palynivore's tactile sensory receptors.

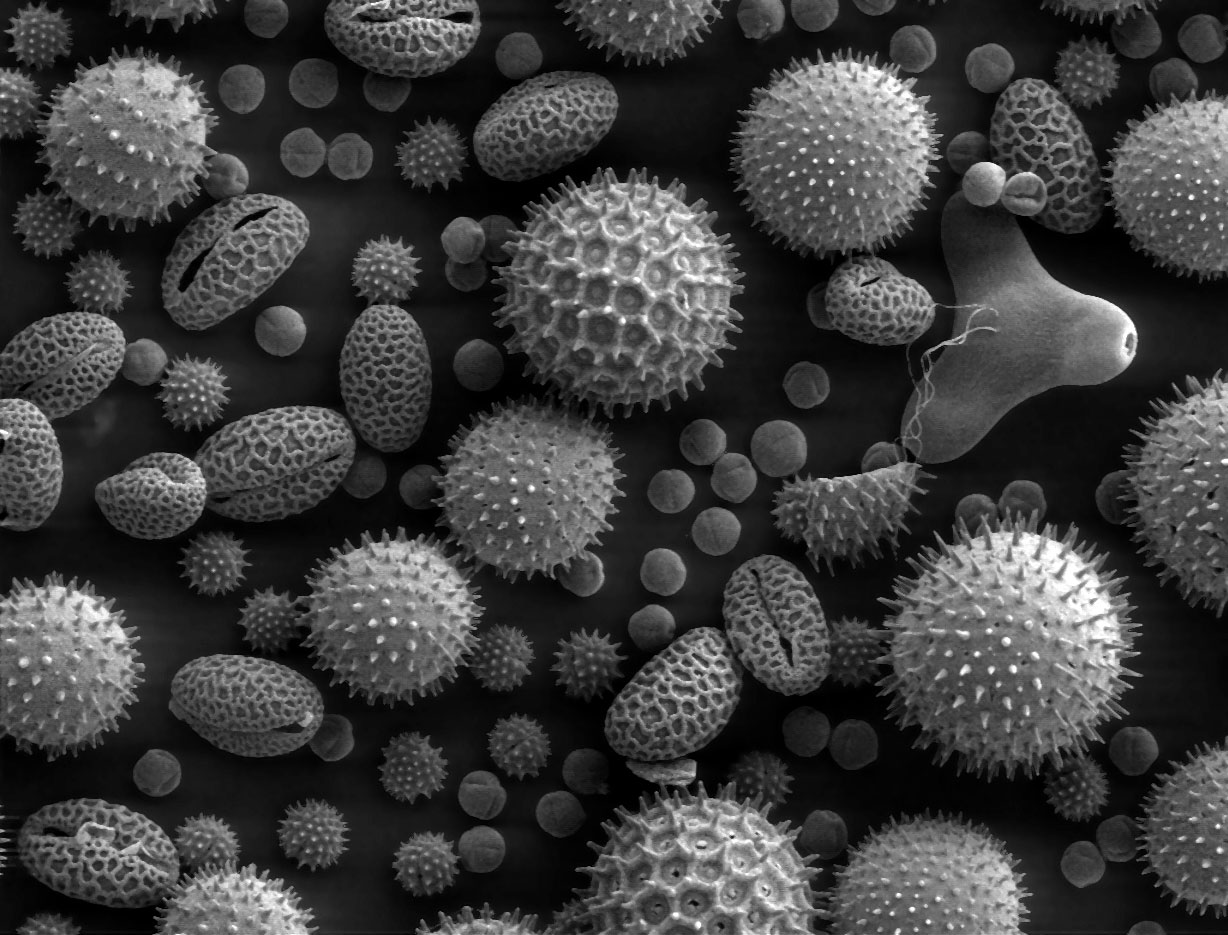
Electron micrograph of various types of pollen

== Evolution ==
The earliest evidence of palynivory can be traced back to the Pennsylvanian period. Fossil evidence from these periods suggests that early arthropods, with unspecialized mandibular mouthparts, engaged in spore-feeding behavior. Unlike pollen, spores are asexual reproductive particles produced by primitive organisms such as ferns, fungi, and bacteria. Palynivory, which is thought to have derived from early spore-feeders, emerged much later during the Pennsylvanian era (323 Mya – 299 Mya). Much of the evidence relating to palynivory evolution has been linked to a change in the structure of mandibular mouthparts, allowing for easier pollen collection. Such evidence can be found in Coleoptera (beetles), the most diverse group of palynivores, wherein species have developed mouthparts for pollen collection in addition to the evolution of early mandibular appendages into specialized structures assisting in pollen consumption.

Furthermore, modern-day palynivore mouthpart adaptations can also be tied to the evolution of ancient palynivore mouthparts involved in nectar uptake. The beginnings of structures involved in nectar uptake can be found in early, unrelated insect clades. The evolution of these structures occurred in three distinct tracks: sponge-like labellum of flies and caddisflies, siphon structures in butterflies and moths, and glossa in wasps and bees. Within each track, further specialization of these structures has occurred. For example, in wasps and bees, eight variations of mouthpart structures incorporating glossa have been identified. The evolution of various structural and morphological adaptations of present-day palynivores has also been thought to have co-evolved with pollen grains.

The abundance and diversity of seed-bearing plant fossils identified from the Late Pennsylvanian suggest greater palynivore evolution and adaptations to the evolving plant fauna. Furthermore, this highlights the co-evolution of this behavior with plant species at the time. Based on the morphological features of fossil remnants of the era, early palynivores are hypothesized to have belonged to the diaphanopterodean, protorthopteran, and hemipteroid taxonomic groups. Following this period, evolution and more specialized adaptations in palynivore mouthparts and pollen or prepollen found in the gut of fossilized insects showed convergence into three major lineages: Orthoptera (grasshoppers, crickets, and locusts), Coleoptera, Diptera (flies), and Hymenoptera (wasps, sawflies, bees, and ants). Currently, almost all palynivores are in five insect orders believed to have come about during the early Mesozoic period (248 Mya - 65 Mya): Coleoptera, Diptera, Thysanoptera (thrips), Hymenoptera, and Lepidoptera (butterflies and moths).

== Adaptations of palynivores ==
Numerous species of insects (bees, wasps, ants, beetles, flies, butterflies, moths), mites, spiders, and birds consume pollen as a food source. To more efficiently collect pollen, palynivores have evolved various adaptations in their body parts and behavior. These adaptations include specialized mouthparts, hair, digestive systems, and patterns of reproduction and foraging. Although all palynivores eat pollen, they do so to varying degrees and ways, so consequently their adaptations also differ. Bees and ants, for example, are insects that place different amounts of emphasis on pollen in their diets.

=== Bees ===
Bees, part of the superfamily Apoidea, engage in palynivory extensively, especially in providing pollen for their offspring. To effectively collect, transport, and consume pollen, bees have evolved specialized morphological and behavioral traits. To forage for pollen, bees must first find sources of pollen, which they do so through chemical, visual, and tactile signals given by flowers that have co-evolved adaptations for this purpose, since most flowering plants benefit from the pollination that occurs while bees collect and transport pollen. Visual signals especially help guide bees to flowers. With sight adaptations such as the ability to see ultraviolet light, bees home in on the color pattern "targets" of flower petals that guide bees to nectar and pollen. They gather and store pollen together with nectar on specialized hairs and evolved scopal or corbicular constructions on their bodies. Bees have also evolved behavioral adaptations that involve some degree of learning. Most bees are also either oligolectic or polylectic, where they target specific or more general groups of flowering plants respectively, and their foraging patterns overlap significantly closely during the day and/or seasonally to the bloom periods of these targeted flowers. In the nest, bees will also communicate the locations of good foraging patches to other worker bees in a process called a waggle dance. Bees often favor certain foraging patches, and while evidence shows that bumblebees for instance are flexible in their foraging patterns, deciding on different types of flowers based on the pollen's protein:lipid ratios, these patterns directly influence the genetics of the flowering plant populations around them.

=== Ants ===
Ants, as part of the order Hymenoptera, are related to bees and similarly forage outside of their nests to transport protein back for their offspring. While pollen is not the sole or primary food source, evidence from studies done on ants species in genera such as Zacryptocerus, Cephalotes (turtle ants), Camponotus (carpenter ants), Crematogaster (acrobat ants), and Odontomachus (trap-jaw ants) show that pollen is both targeted for consumption and eaten opportunistically. In foraging, ants cannot fly to flowers to take pollen directly. Instead, they collect it from places where pollen has fallen or the wind has carried pollen to. Ants commonly store liquid food in their foregut and later regurgitate it to feed their offspring in the home nest. Several species of neotropical ants, turtle ants, for example, collect pollen from leaves and store it in their bodies to later regurgitate. During this process, they produce compressed masses of pollen called pellets, "infrabuccal pellets" in turtle ants, that allow for greater efficiency in transporting pollen. After ant offspring or worker ants consume the nutrient-rich parts of the pollen from these pellets, the membranes of pollen, unable to be digested, are then discarded.

== Future of palynivores ==
=== Palynivores and flowering plants ===
Palynivores are essential to spreading the genes of flowering plants via the use of pollen which is the vector for genetic diversity in these plants. While wind and other natural resources can help in the process of spreading pollen, they are not specific and do not provide as direct a service as palynivores who although they eat the pollen also work to move the pollen from one plant to another thereby participating in pollination services. Over the past decade, there has been a decline in palynivore species worldwide that has had drastic consequences for flowering plants. As the palynivore population decreases, so do the pollination services they provide. This in turn lowers the reproductive success of flowering plants and causes an overall decline in the population of flowering plants and the number of species of flowering plants.

=== Specific versus general palynivores ===
Palynivores can generally be grouped in two categories: specific and general. Specific palynivores exhibit oligolecty, a sympathetic relationship with a specific genus or species of flowering plants, while general palynivores can pollinate a wide range of plants. Because of the specialty of certain types of palynivores such as honey bees, their life cycles have adapted to be closely correlated with the flowering periods of certain species of plants. However, when the pollination and flowering periods of these plants change because of seasonal variations caused by climate change, the palynivore life cycles are no longer in synchronization with that of the plant, thereby causing a decline in both populations. General palynivores on the other hand are adapted to consume pollen from and pollinate a wide range of different flowering plants with different flowering periods. The decline in specific palynivores can consequently lead to an increase in populations of general palynivores due to a decrease in competition and the increase in availability of resources.

==== Bumblebee populations ====
The interaction between general and specific species is best shown through members of the genus Bombus, more commonly known as bumblebees. Bumblebees have shown evidence of population decline within both Belgium and the UK with six of the sixteen non-parasitic bumblebees showing considerable decline and four showing possible signs of decline. These observational studies have shown that this decline has been similarly mirrored in the populations of wild plants with which these bumblebees correspond. However, this decline has not been prevalent among all populations of bumblebees. While many populations of bumblebees have shown a decline, there have been others that have stayed constant or even increased. In the same study of sixteen non-parasitic bumblebees there were six populations that stayed constant or even increased over the course of the study.

=== Causes of palynivore decline ===
Research has shown that a range of different environmental changes and climate changes such as habitat fragmentation, the introduction of different agrochemicals, and global warming are projected to lead to a decrease in palynivore populations and consequently a decrease in pollination services.

==== Habitat fragmentation ====
For many palynivores, especially colony insects such as bees and ants, suitable habitats are very important and must meet specific requirements. Habitat fragmentation can make these habitats inadequate to provide suitable and sustainable floral resources and suitable nesting sites within a reasonable flight range from each other. Depending on whether the pollinator is specific or general, the needs for the population may be different.

===== Specific palynivores =====
For specific palynivores exhibiting oligolecty, the adult seasonal emergence must coincide with the host plant's seasonal bloom. With these specific constraints in place, it can be inferred that specific palynivores must be located are heavily dependent on the seasonal variation of their host plants and the loss of even a small portion of their habitat can have drastic repercussions on the population size.

===== General palynivores =====
For general palynivores their foraging periods typically last longer than the seasonal bloom of one host. General palynivores must be located within flying distance of multiple different patches of floral plants each with their own flowering periods. Their survival is dependent on their ability to access each of these flower patches at different times during the season and inability to access specific patches due to either obstruction or destruction of these patches can result in decreased population size.

==== Agrochemicals ====
Dinotefuran a type of neonicotinoid which are highly neurotoxic to insects and mimic their acetylcholine neurotransmitter

Agrochemical is short for agricultural chemical and have largely been used in farms and gardens to deter and kill insect pests. One common agrochemical is neonicotinoids which are highly neurotoxic to insects and mimic their acetylcholine neurotransmitters. When applied, neonicotinoids are typically sprayed widely and persist on the soil, in the water, and are taken up by plants. They are toxic and enter into the insect's body resulting in the impairment of foraging success, brood and larval development, and memory and learning as well as causing harmful effects on the nervous system, immune system, and hygiene of the insect. All of these factors negatively impact colony performance and have the potential to lead to colony collapse for both bees and ants.

==== Global warming ====
Climate change or global warming has resulted in higher average temperatures worldwide which has had significant repercussions on the foraging success of palynivores. Plants have experienced earlier flower and maturity both of which have been shown to be associated with warmer spring temperatures. Since the reproductive cycles of many palynivores are intimately linked to the flowering cycles of their host plants, many palynivore species have not been able to keep up with this change in flowering cycles of many host plants. This has resulted in a drastic decrease in the populations of many specific palynivores and their host plants. However an increase in general palynivore populations has also been recorded. This rise can be attributed to the decrease in competition for these certain host plants as well as the general palynivore's ability to adapt to a changing food source.

== Future actions ==
There has been a general decline in plant and palynivore species diversity which is predicted to continue with the current trends in the release of greenhouse gasses and climate change. Given the extent of current research and evidence depicting the correlation between palynivore decline and a decline in pollinating plants' reproductive success, below are proposed steps that could potentially mitigate the loss of palynivore species.

1. Restoring and protecting palynivore habitat in the form of the floral reserves of threatened migratory palynivores
2. Planting more native plants to attract native palynivores
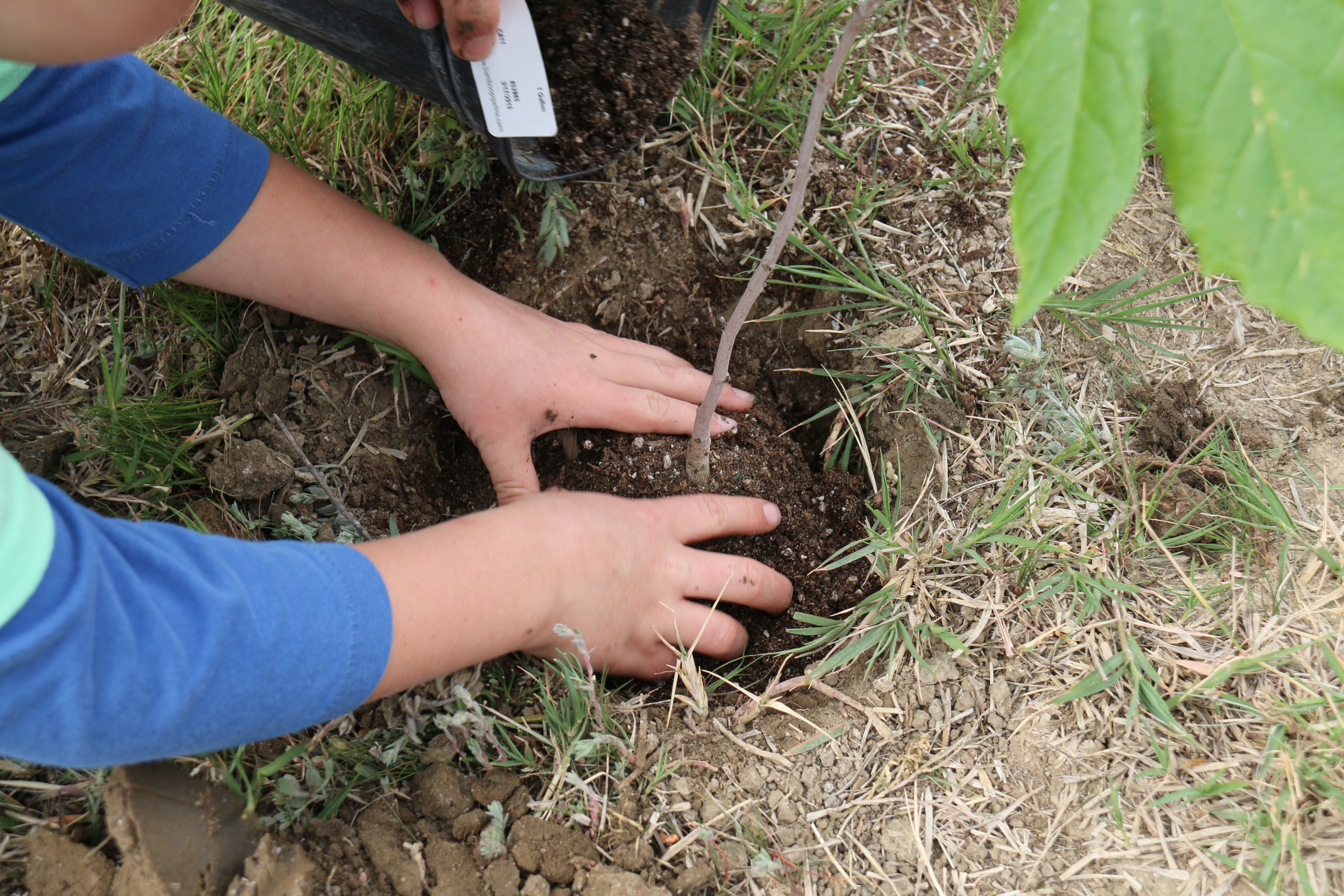
  Students at the Simi Valley Adventist School planting native plants in their schoolyard habitat project. This will help benefit native pollinators and native wildlife.
3. Increasing the available habitat for palynivores in and around croplands and gardens
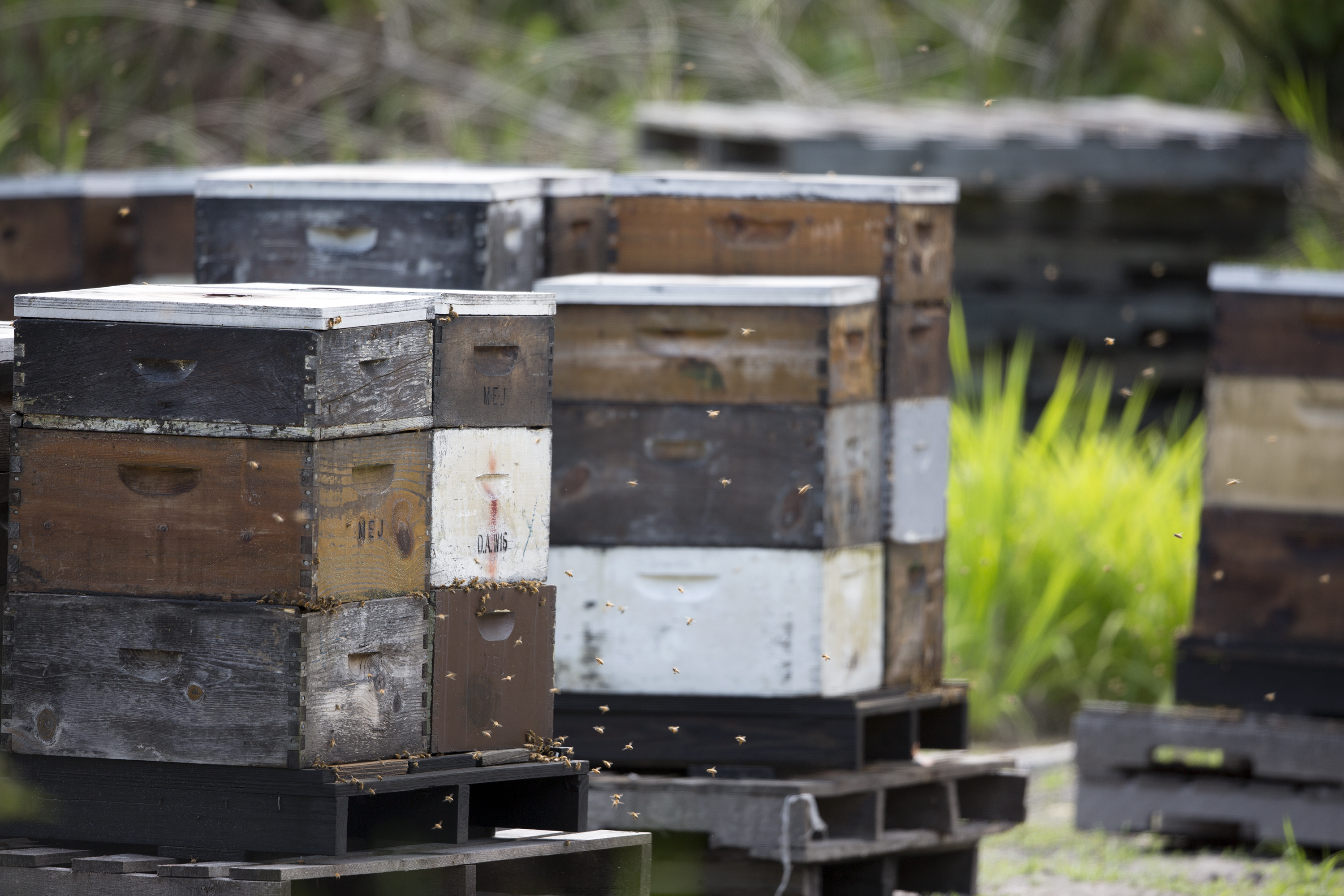
  Bees swarming around a man made beehive compliments of NASA Kennedy Wildlife
4. Mitigating the use of pesticides, agrochemicals, and herbicides
