= List of Syrphidae genera =

The family Syrphidae consists of more than 6000 living species of hoverfly. The internal taxonomy of the family and the number of genera varies greatly between sources leading to considerable discrepancy across the literature. This is currently in the process of reorganization on the basis of phylogenetic studies but knowledge is still incomplete, especially in light of recent studies of larval characters suggesting relationships which don't correspond with the phylogeny based solely on adult characters.

The current classification is therefore still based on the morphology of adults and basically refers to the taxonomic scheme adopted by Thompson & Rotheray in the Manual of Palaearctic Diptera (1998), which divides the family into three subfamilies and fourteen tribes.

The nomenclature given here is derived partly from the BioSystematic Database of World Diptera (BDWD), and a working classification created by a group of molecular biologists which no doubt will alter greatly in the future.

The distribution of genera in biogeographic realms is derived from the biosystematics BDWD.

== Legend ==
- AF: Afrotropical realm
- AU: Australasian realm
- NE: Nearctic realm
- NT: Neotropical realm
- OR: Oriental realm
- PA: Palearctic realm

== Eristalinae ==
The subfamily Eristalinae (=Milesiinae) is subdivided into 9 tribes.

=== Tribe: Brachyopini ===
(=Chrysogasterini Shannon, 1922)

==== Subtribe: Brachyopina ====
- Brachyopa (=Eugeniamyia): NE OR PA
  - Subgenera:
    - B. (Brachyopa) Meigen, 1822
    - B. (Hammerschmidtia) Schummel, 1834
    - B. (Trichobrachyopa) Kassebeer, 2001
- Cacoceria Hull, 1936: NT
- Chromocheilosia Hull & Fluke, 1950: NT
- Chrysogaster Meigen, 1803 (=Ighboulomyia): AF NE PA
- Chrysosyrphus Sedman, 1965: NE PA
- Cyphipelta Bigot, 1859: AU
- Hemilampra Macquart, 1850: AU
- Lejogaster Rondani, 1857: PA
- Lepidomyia Loew, 1864 (=Lepidostola): NE NT
- Liochrysogaster Stackelberg, 1924: PA
- Melanogaster Rondani, 1857
- Myolepta (=Eumyolepta, Sarolepta, Xylotaeja) : AF NE NT OR PA
  - Subgenera:
    - M. (Myolepta) Loew, 1864
    - M. (Protolepidostola) Hull, 1949d : NT
- Neoplesia Macquart, 1850
- Orthonevra Macquart, 1829: NE NT OR PA
- Riponnensia Maibach, Goeldlin & Speight, 1994

==== Subtribe: Spheginina ====
- Austroascia Thompson & Marnef, 1977: NT
- Chamaesphegina Shannon & Aubertin, 1922 (=Desmetrum): NT
- Neoascia (=Stenopipiza): NE OR PA
  - Subgenera:
    - N. (Neoascia) Williston, 1887
    - N. (Neoasciella) Stackelberg, 1965
- Sphegina : NE OR PA
  - Subgenera:
    - S. (Sphegina) Meigen, 1822
    - S. (Asiosphegina) Stackelberg, 1975
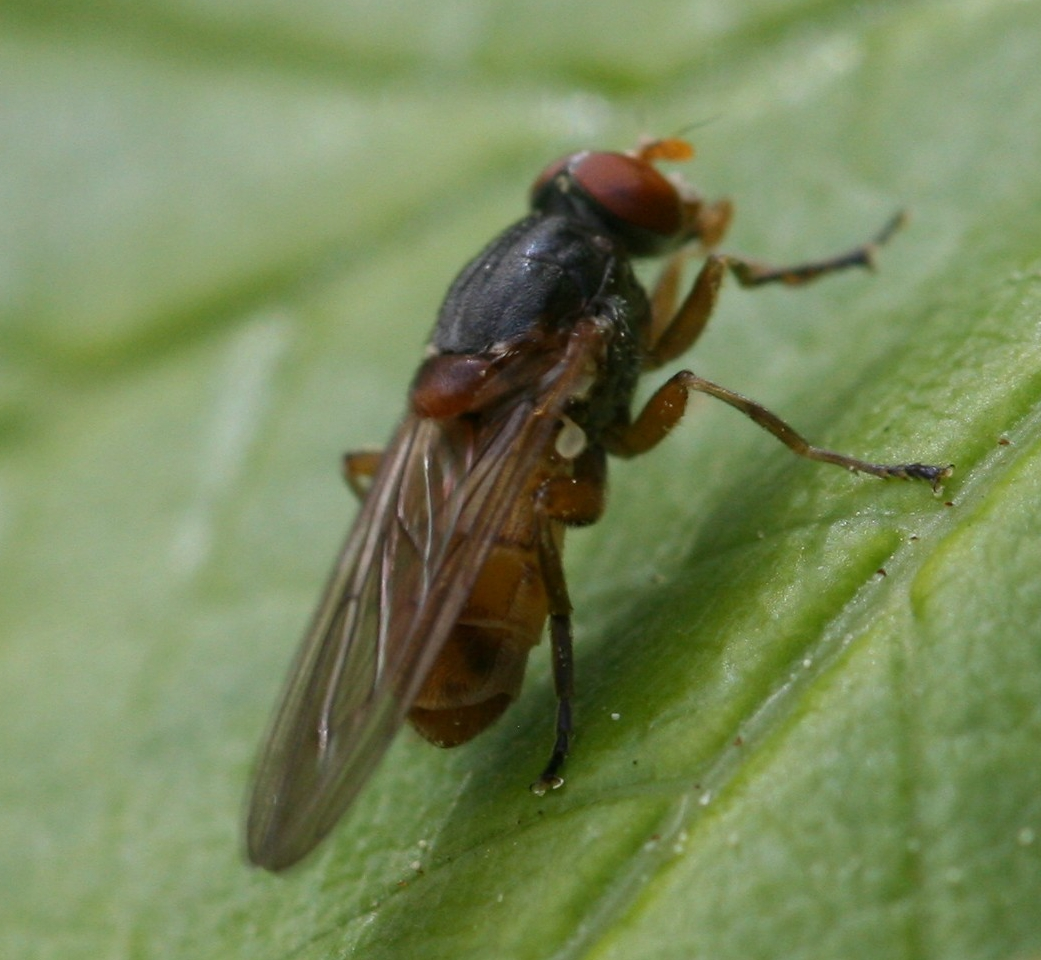
Brachyopa

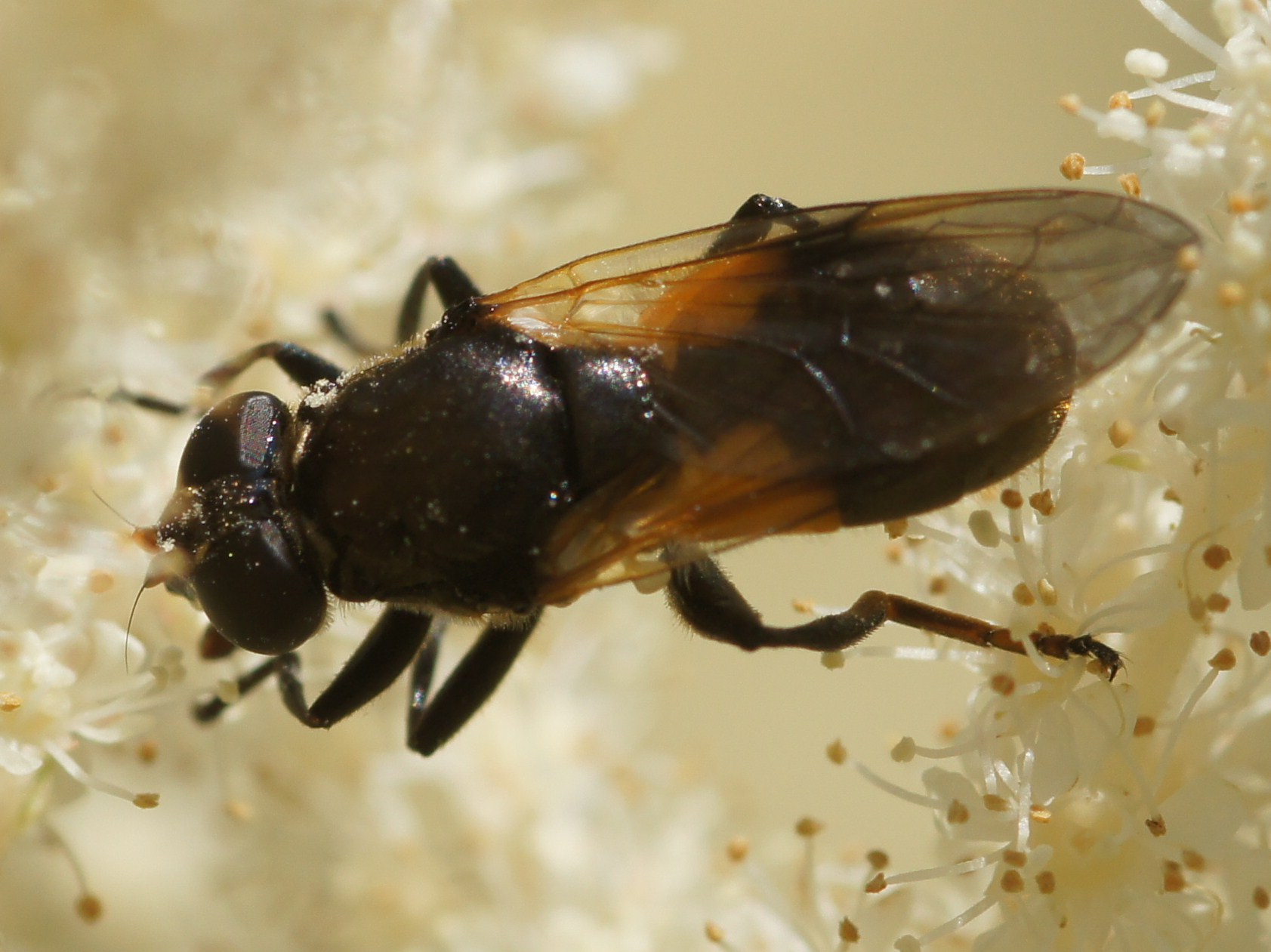
Myolepta

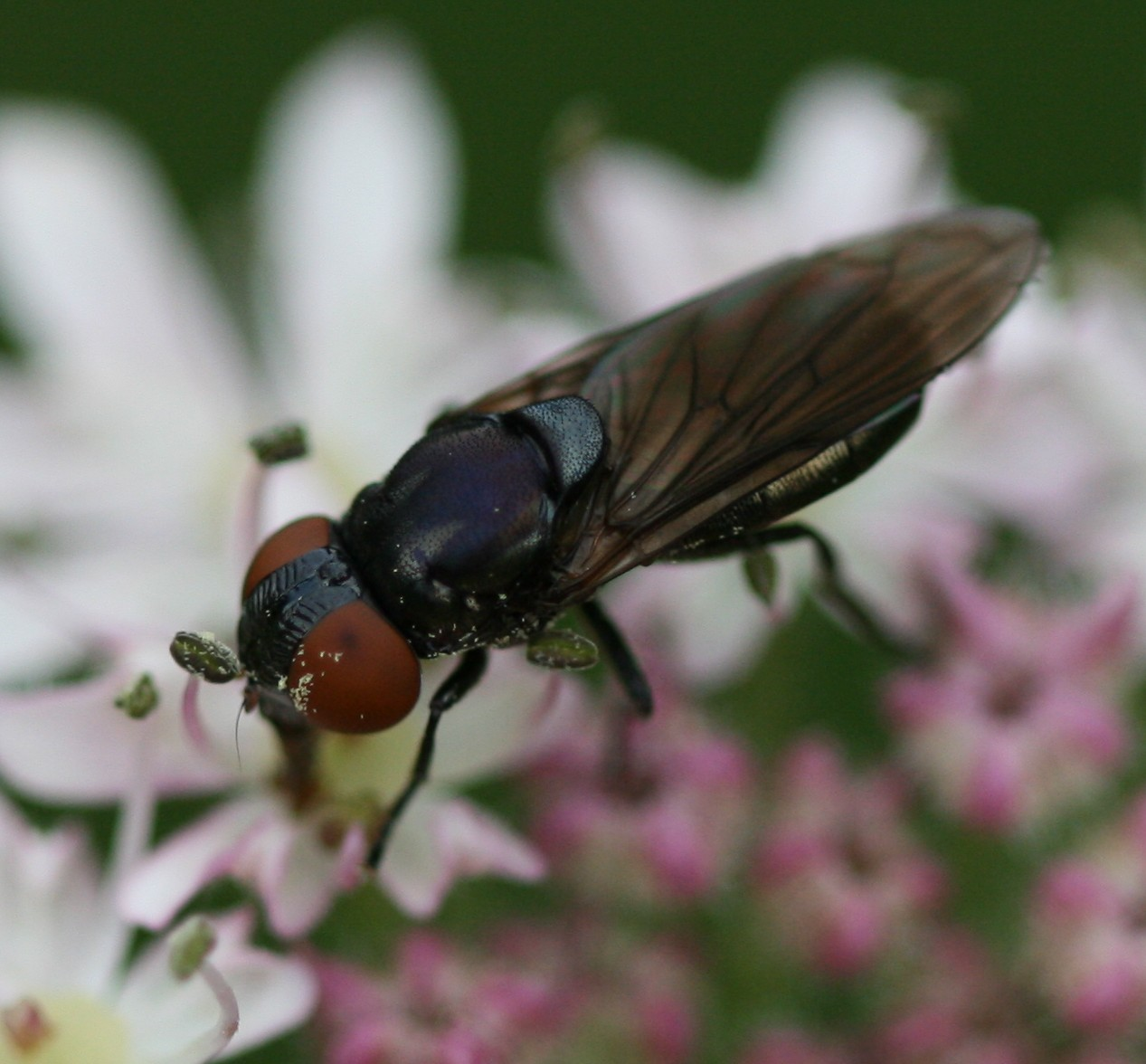
Chrysogaster

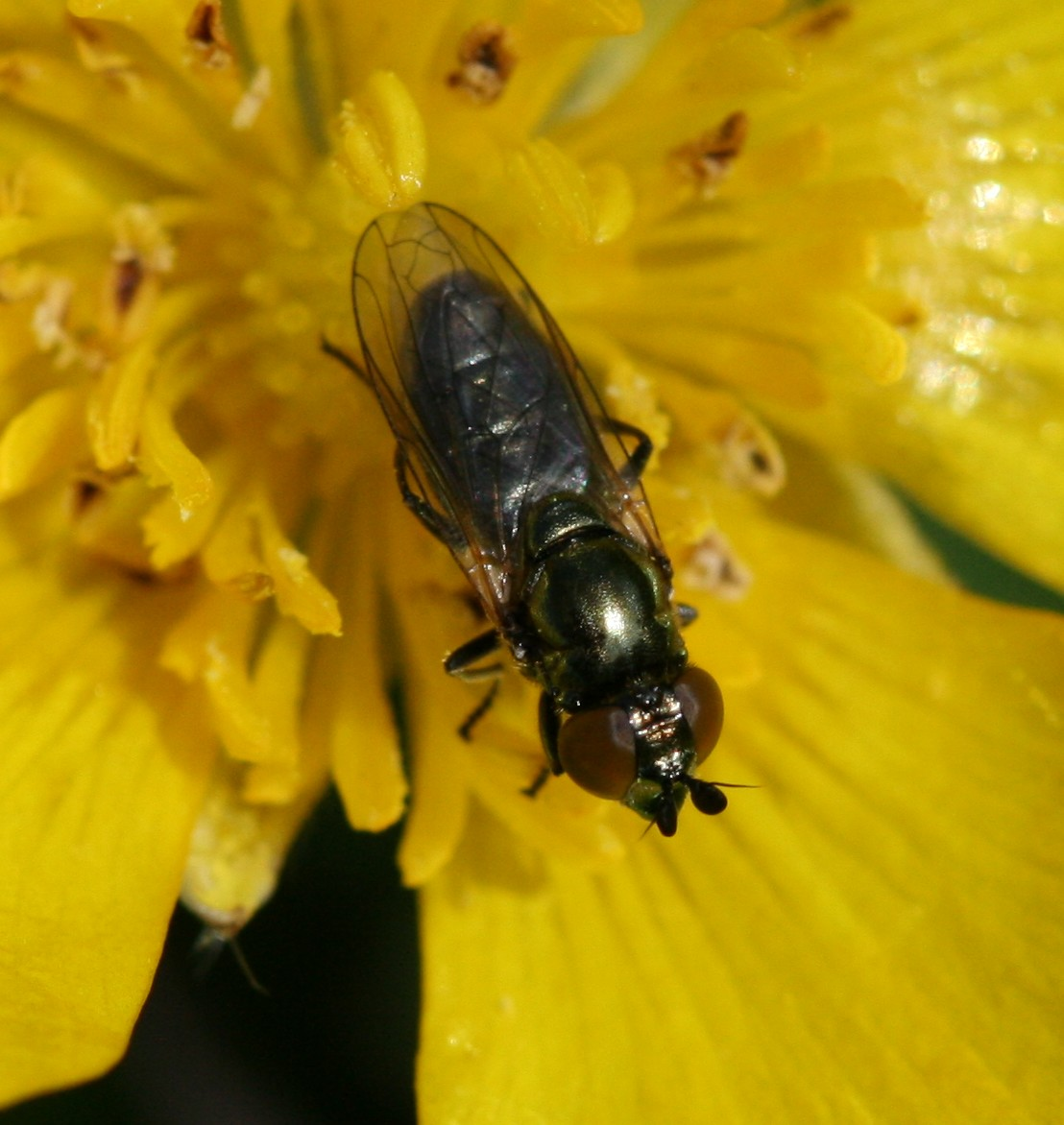
Lejogaster

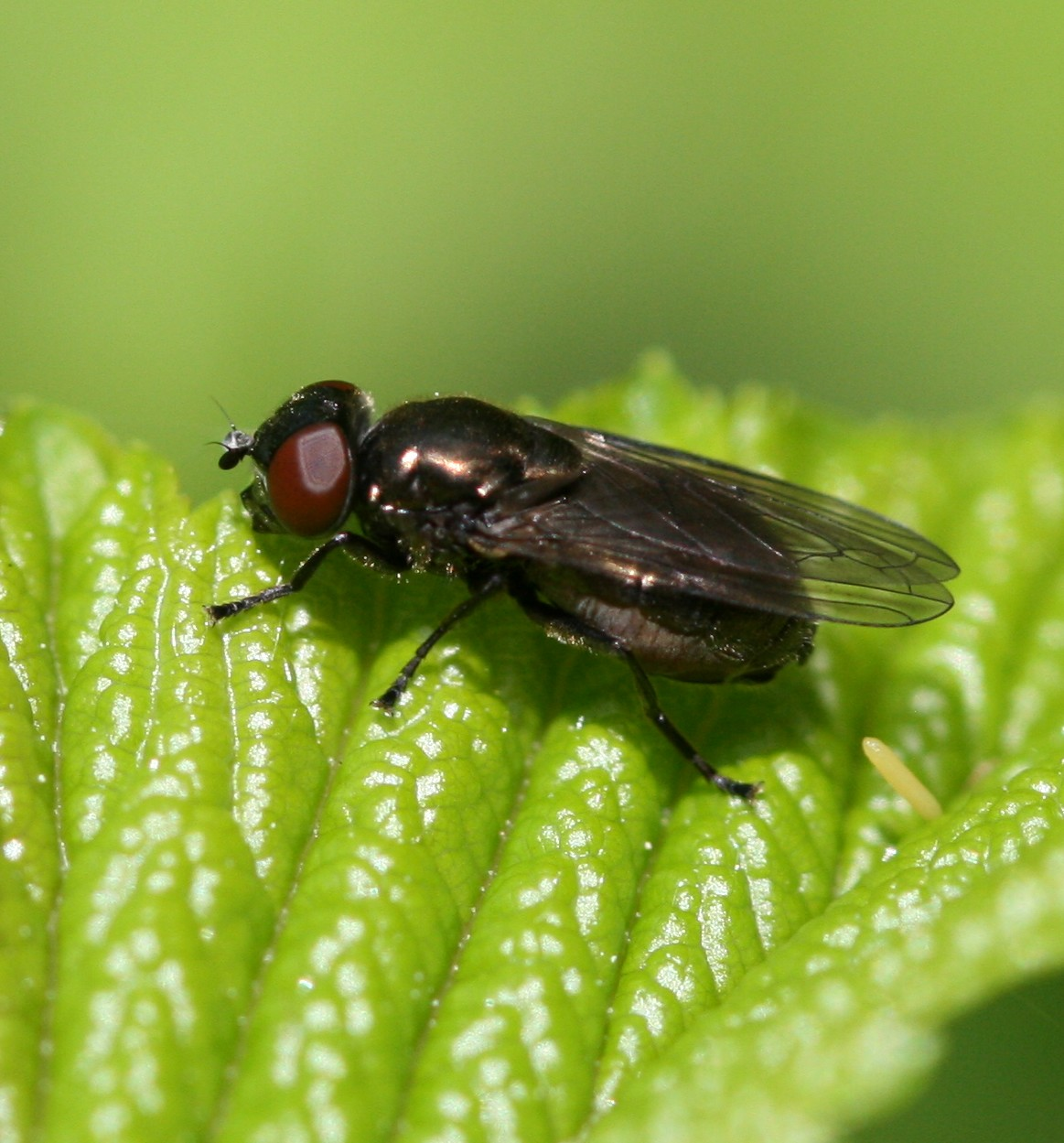
Melanogaster

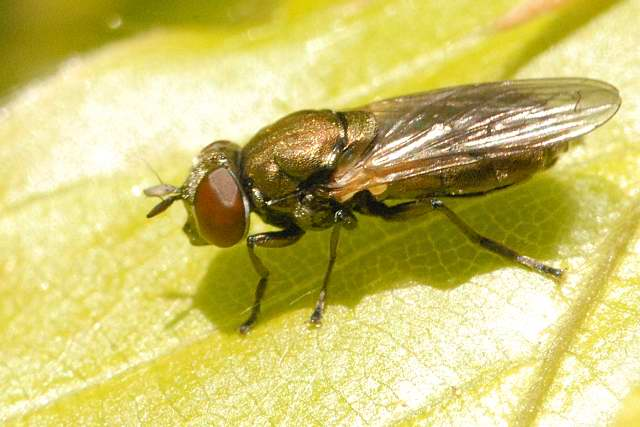
Orthonevra

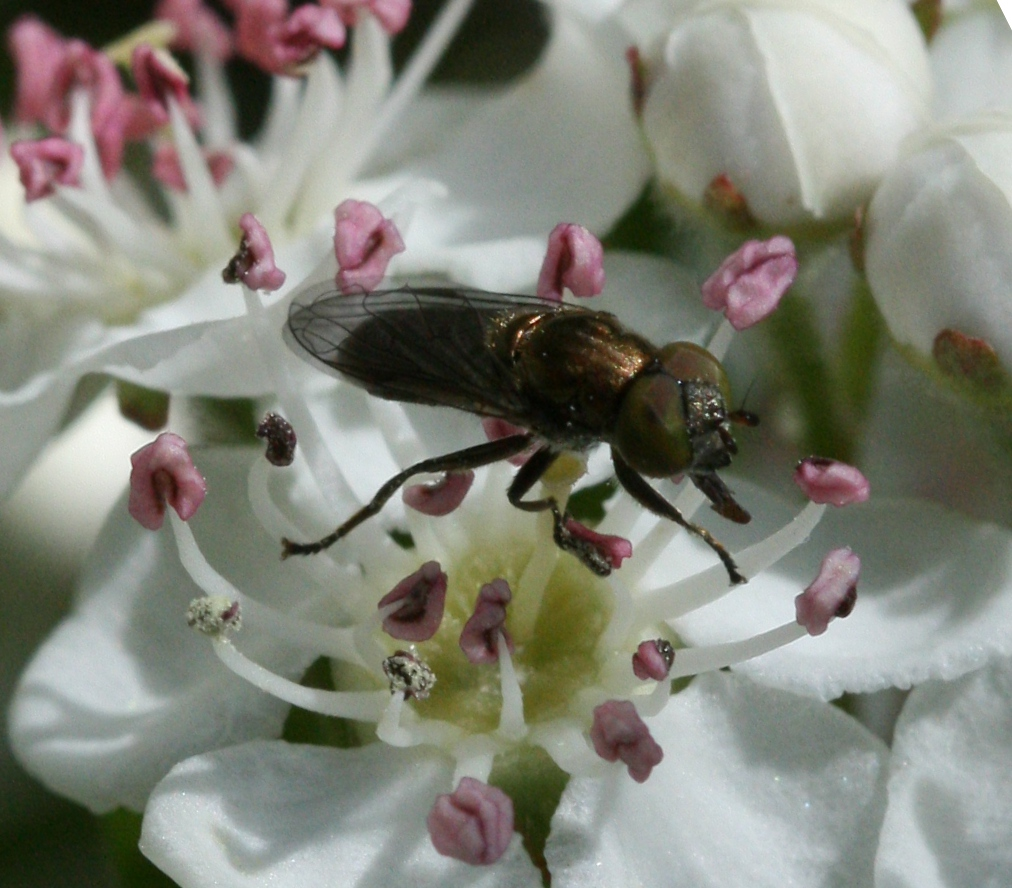
Riponnensia

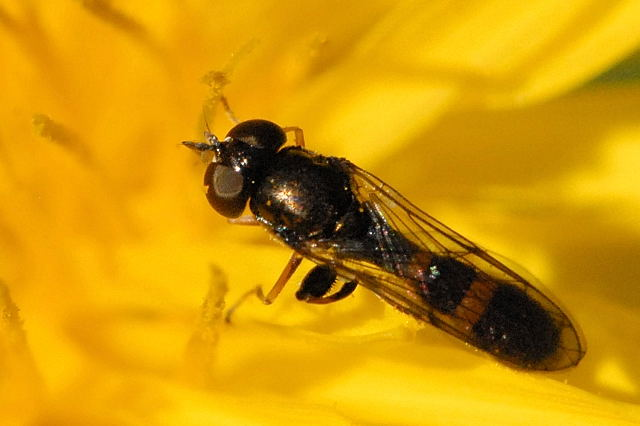
Neoascia

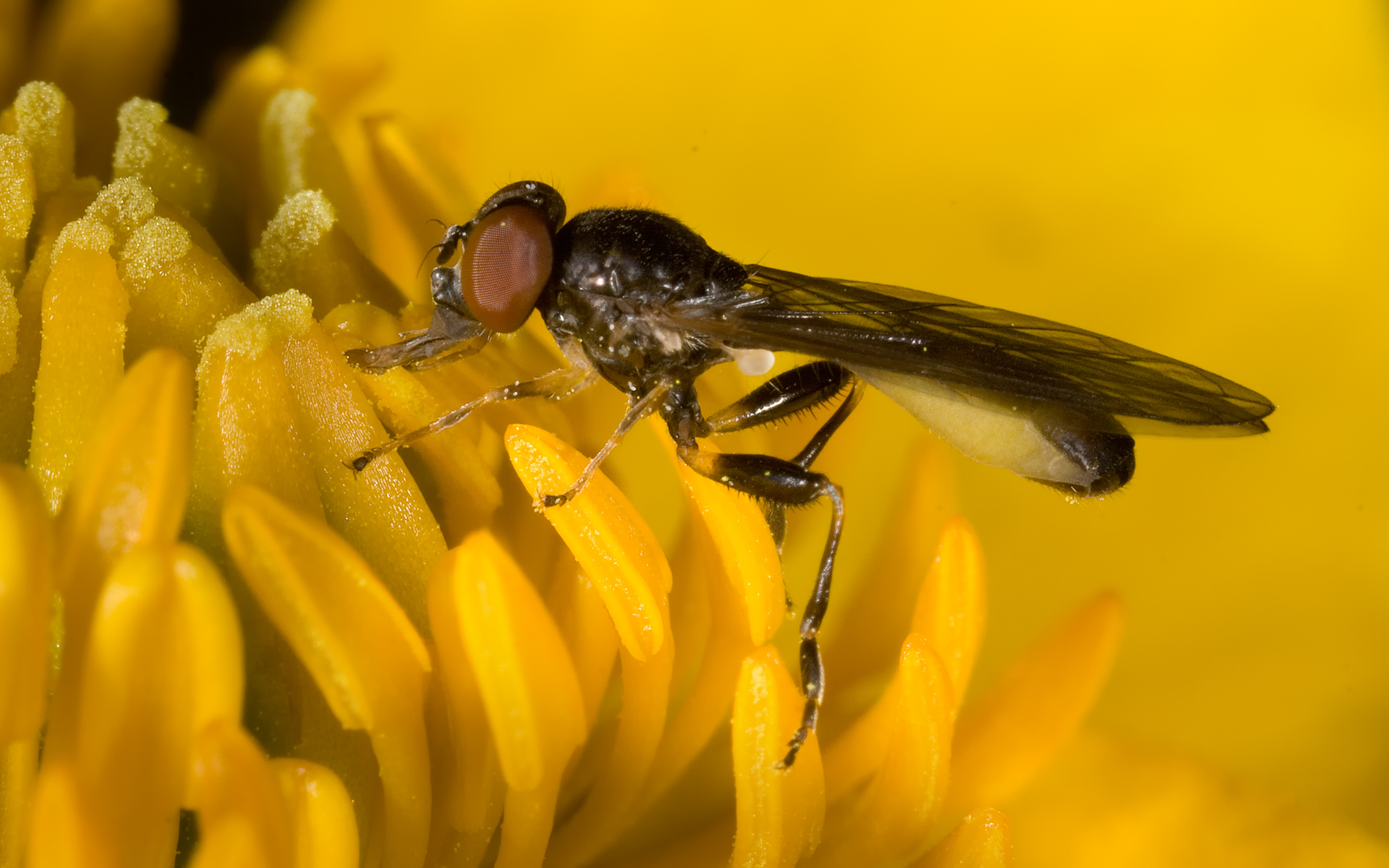
Sphegina

=== Tribe: Callicerini ===
(=Calliceratinae Brues & Melander, 1932)

- Callicera Panzer, 1809: NE NT OR PA
- Notiocheilosia Thompson, 1972: NT

=== Tribe: Cerioidini ===
(=Ceriini, Cerioidinae Wahlgren, 1909)

- Ceriana (=Ceria, Ceriathrix, Cerioides, Hisamatsumyia, Shambalia, Tenthredomyia)
  - Subgenera:
    - C. (Ceriana) Rafinesque, 1815
    - C. (Monoceromyia) Shannon, 1925
    - C. (Polybiomyia) Shannon, 1925
    - C. (Sphiximorpha) Rondani, 1850
- Primocerioides Shannon, 1927: PA
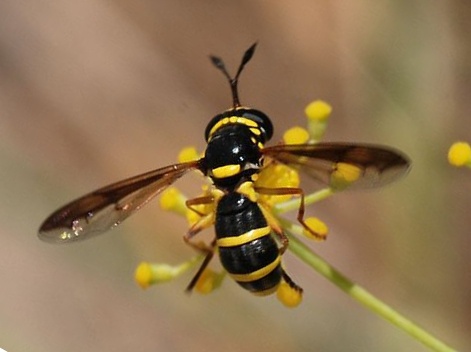
Ceriana

=== Tribe: Eristalini ===
==== Subtribe: Eristalina ====
- Austalis Thompson & Vockeroth, 2003: AU
- Axona Walker, 1864: AU OR
- Digulia Meijere, 1913: AU
- Dissoptera Edwards, 1915 (=Xenozoon): AU OR
- Eristalinus (=Metalloeristalis, Oreristalis): cosmopolitan
  - Subgenera:
    - E. (Eristalinus) Rondani, 1845
    - E. (Eristalodes) Mik, 1897
    - E. (Helophilina) Becker, 1922
    - E. (Lathyrophthalmus) Mik, 1897
    - E. (Merodonoides) Curran, 1931
- Eristalis (=Cristalis, Elophilus, Eristaloides, Eristalomya, Eristalomyia, Eriops, Tubifera): cosmopolitan
  - Subgenera:
    - E. (Eoseristalis) Kanervo, 1938
    - E. (Eristalis) Latreille, 1804
- Keda Curran, 1931: AU OR
- Kertesziomyia (Note: Not to be confused with the very similar name Kerteszomyia (Diptera: Lauxaniidae)) (=Catacores, Kertesziomya, Klossia, Paramesembrius): AU OR PA
  - Subgenera:
    - K. (Kertesziomyia) Shiraki, 1930
    - K. (Pseuderistalis) Shiraki, 1930
- Lycastrirhyncha Bigot, 1859: NT
- Meromacroides Curran, 1927: AF
- Meromacrus Rondani, 1849 (=Metameromacrus, Plagiocera, Promilesia, Pteroptila, Thalamopales): NT
- Palpada (=Doliosyrphus): NE NT
- Phytomia (=Megaspis, Streblia): AF AU OR PA
  - Subgenera:
    - P. (Dolichomerus) Macquart, 1850
    - P. (Phytomia) Guerin-Meneville, 1833
- Senaspis Macquart, 1850 (=Protylocera, Triatylosus): AF
- Simoides Loew, 1858: AF
- Solenaspis Osten Sacken, 1881: AU OR
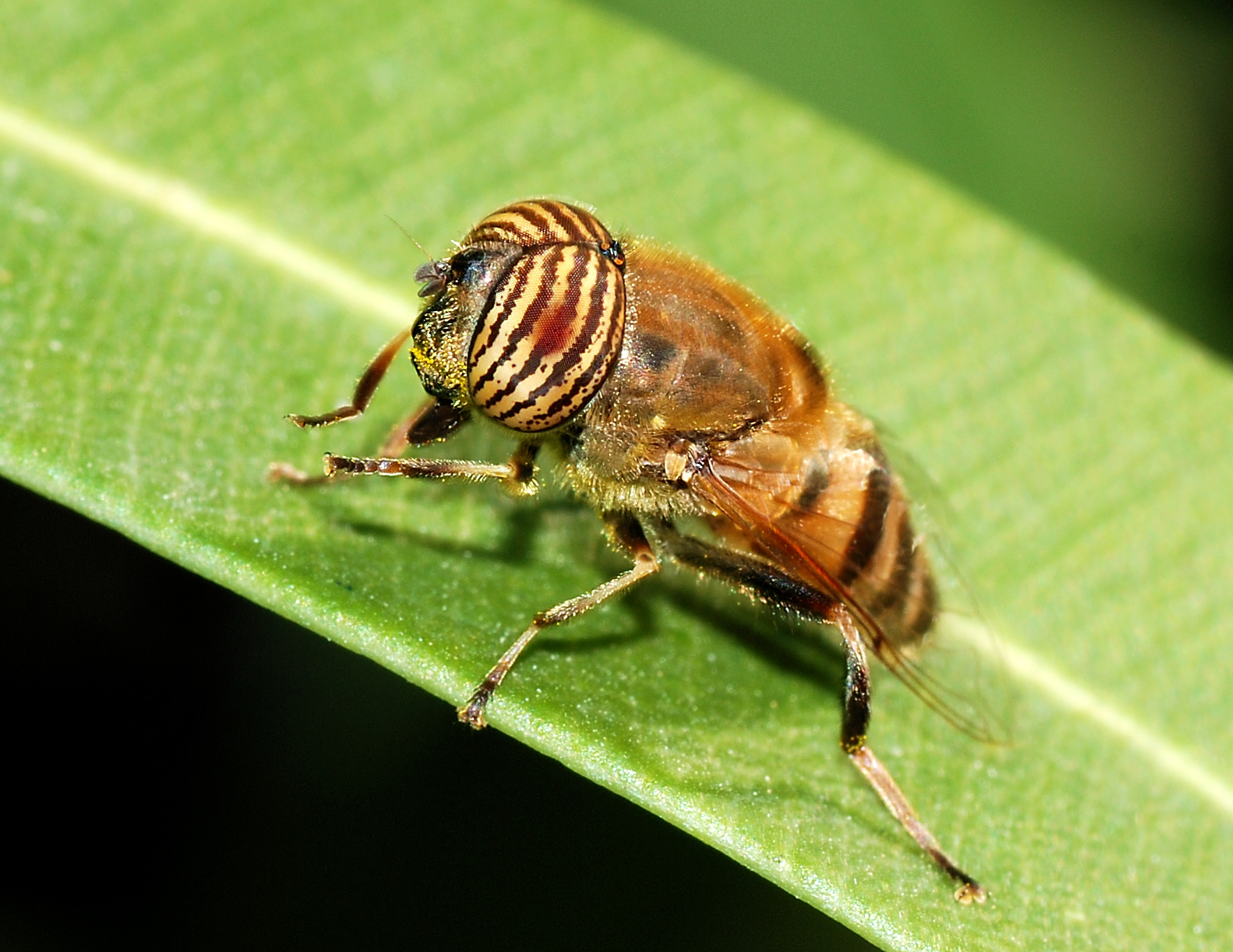
Eristalinus

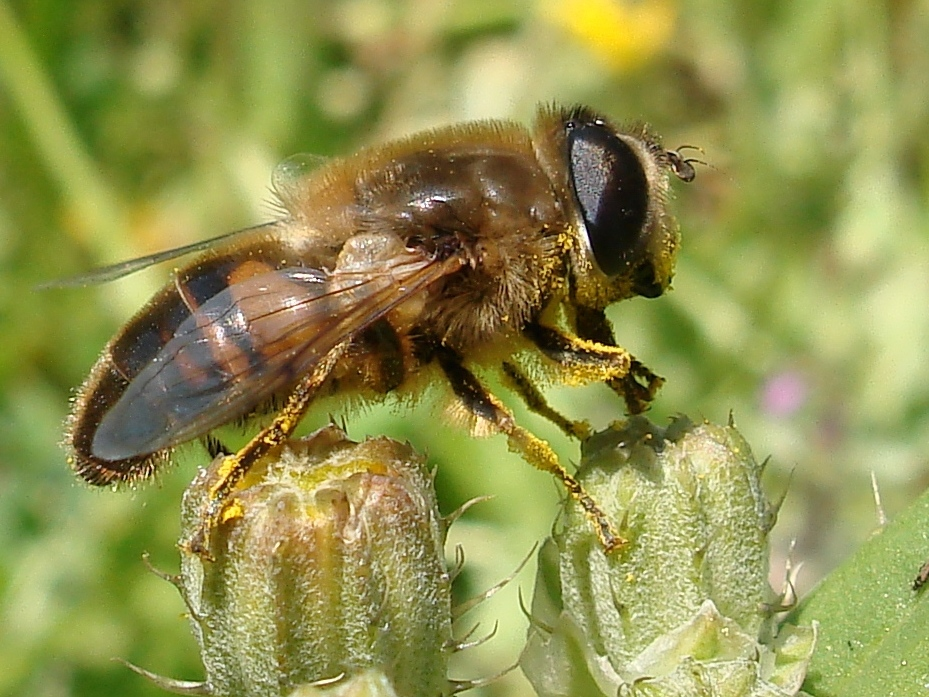
Eristalis

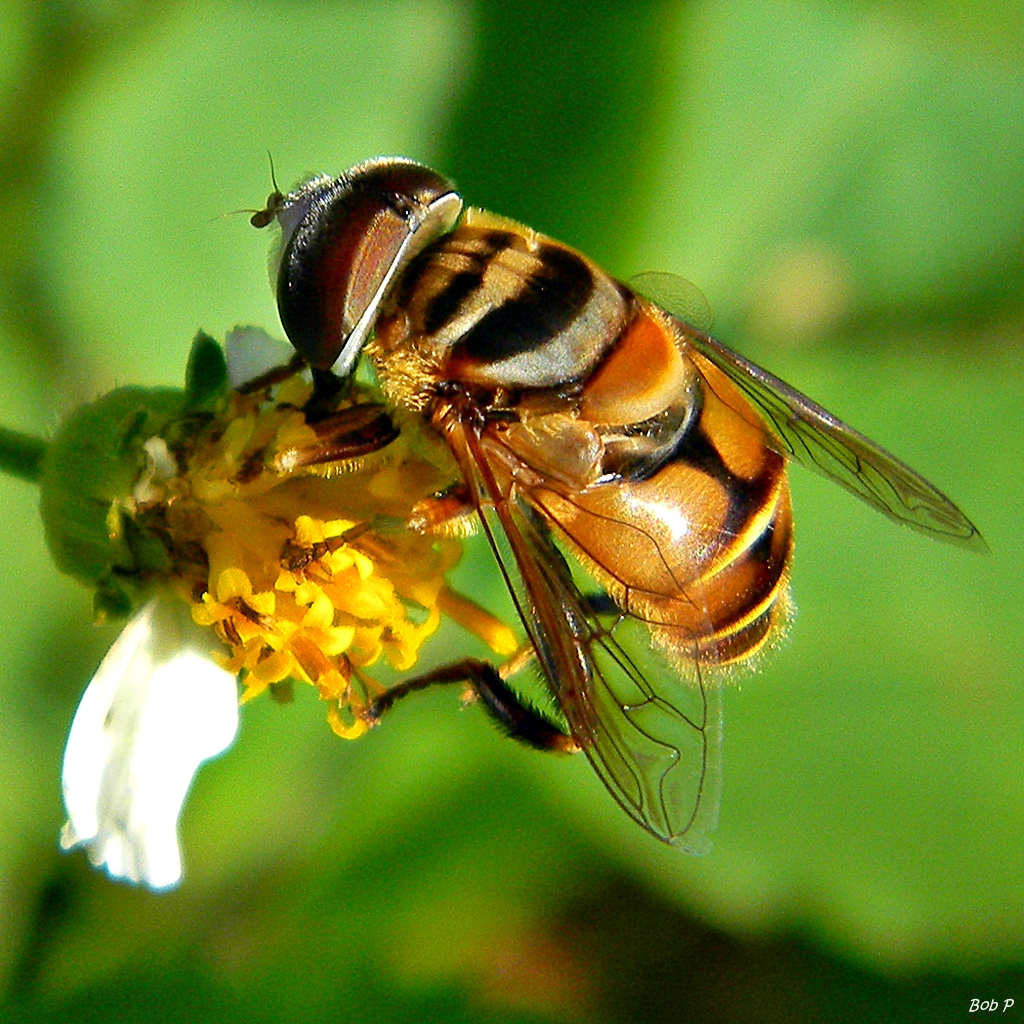
Palpada

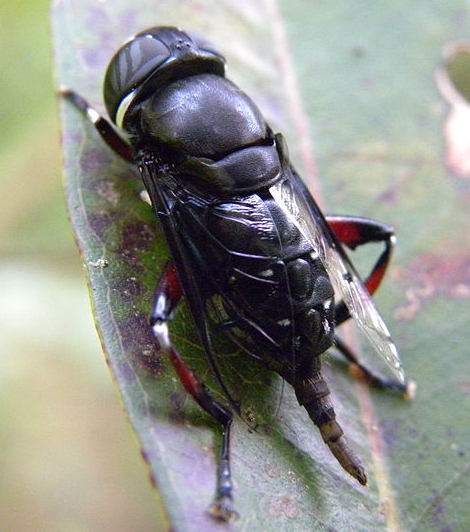
Phytomia

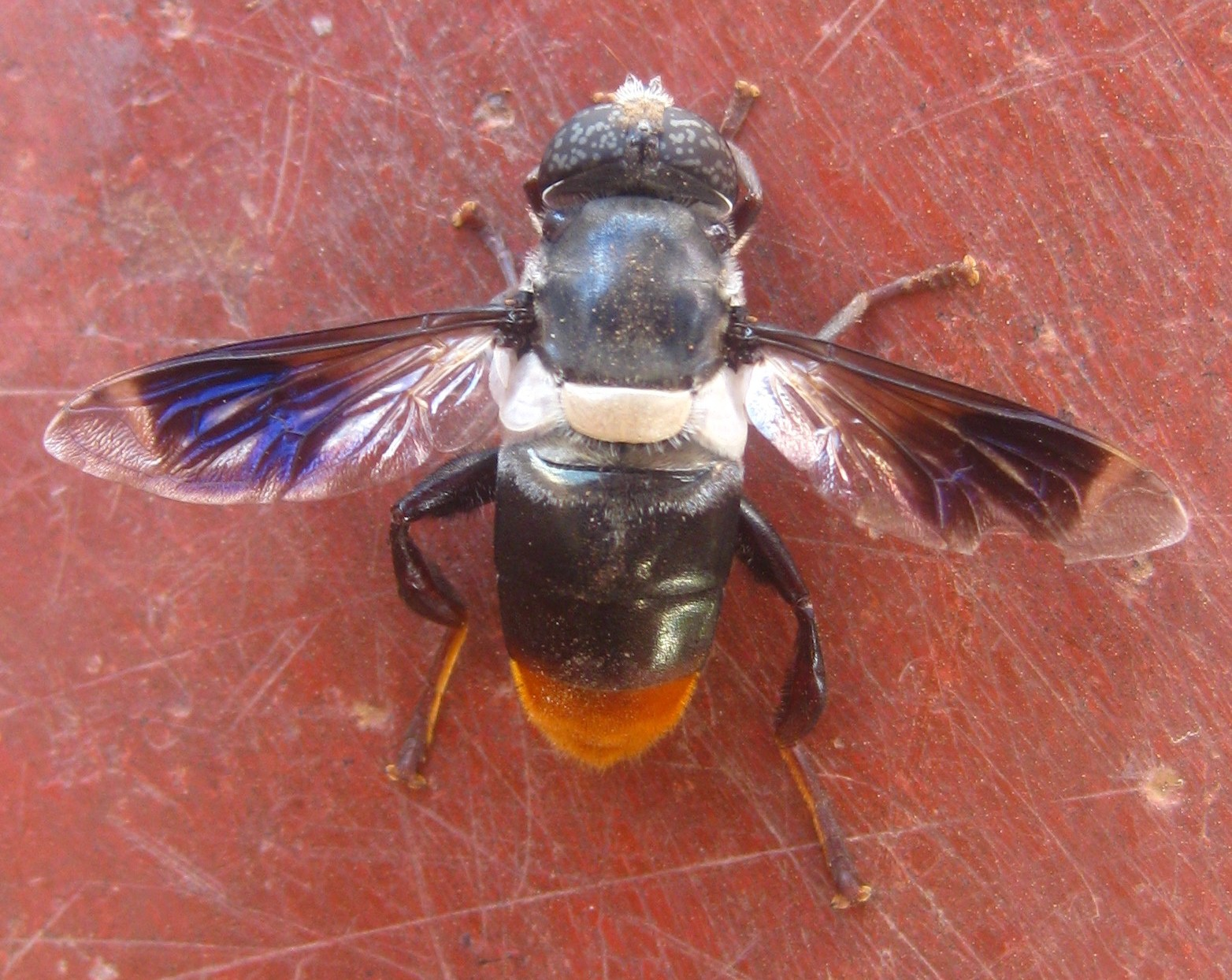
Senaspis

==== Subtribe: Helophilina ====
- Austrophilus Thompson, 2000: AU
- Chasmomma Bezzi, 1915: AF
- Dolichogyna : NT
  - Subgenera:
    - D. (Dolichogyna) Macquart, 1842
    - D. (Nosodepus) Speiser, 1913
- Habromyia Williston, 1888 (=Edwardsietta): NT
- Helophilus (=Kirimyia): AU NE PA
  - Subgenera:
    - H. (Helophilus) Meigen, 1822
    - H. (Pilinasica). (Note: With regard to the subgenus H. (Pilinasica) consisting of four species endemic to New Zealand, Thompson (2000, 2008) and Katzourakis et al. use the name Pilinascia instead. It is likely this has been the result of a spread of a misspelling as in the literature there have been no formal reviews of the name Pilinasica Malloch, 1922 with the exception of the proposal of a subgenus of Helophilus.)
- Lejops (=Eurinomyia): AF NE PA
  - Subgenera:
    - L. (Anasimyia) Schiner, 1864
    - L. (Arctosyrphus) Frey, 1918
    - L. (Asemosyrphus) Bigot, 1882
    - L. (Eurimyia) Bigot, 1883
    - L. (Lejops) Rondani, 1857
    - L. (Lunomyia) Curran & Fluke, 1926
    - L. (Polydontomyia) Williston, 1896
- Mallota (=Imatisma, Paramallota, Trigridemyia): AF NE NT OR PA
  - Subgenera:
    - M. (Mallota) Meigen, 1822
    - M. (Myathropa) Rondani, 1845
- Mesembrius (=Prionotomyia, Tityusia): AF AU OR PA
  - Subgenera:
    - M. (Mesembrius) Rondani, 1857
    - M. (Vadonimyia) Séguy, 1951
- Ohmyia Thompson, 1999: NT
- Parhelophilus Girschner, 1897 (=Pleskeola): NE PA
- Quichuana Knab, 1913: NT
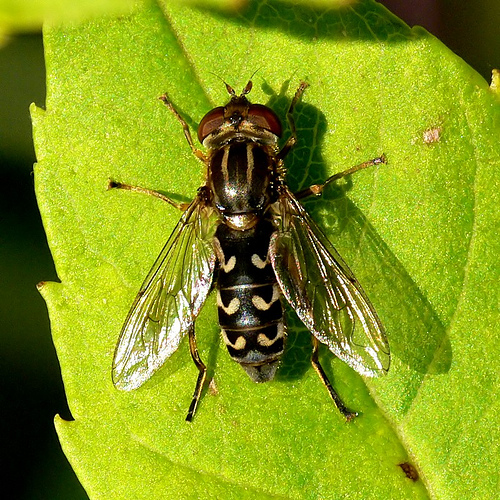
Anasimyia

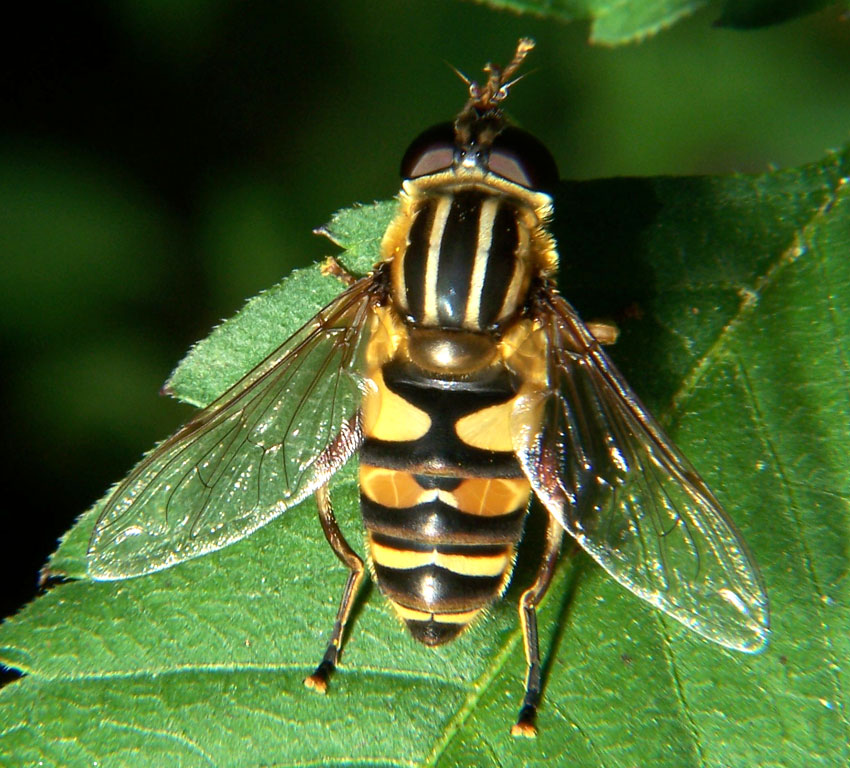
Helophilus

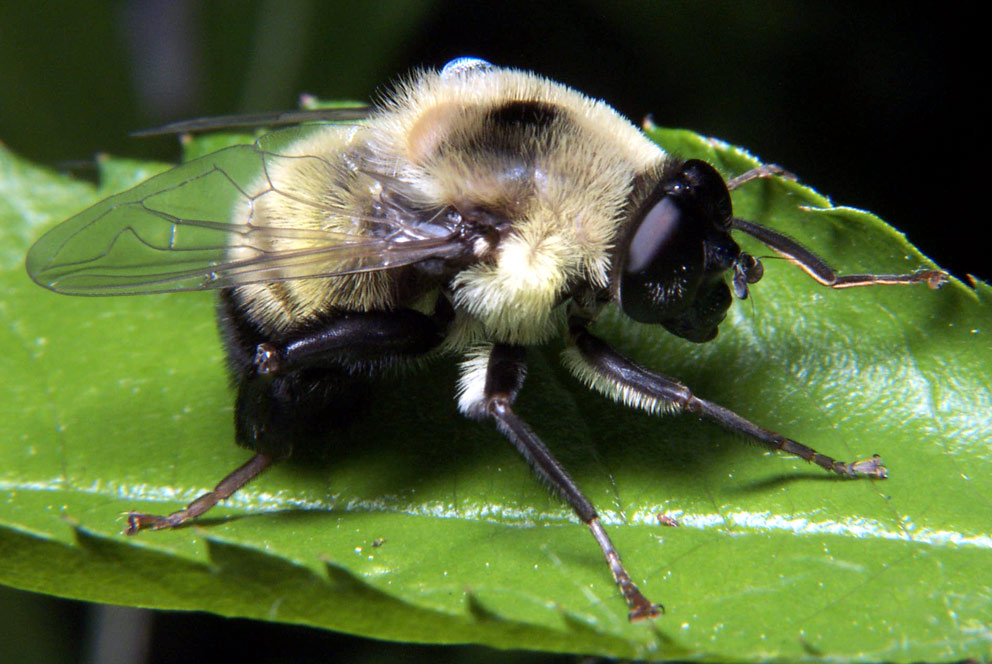
Mallota

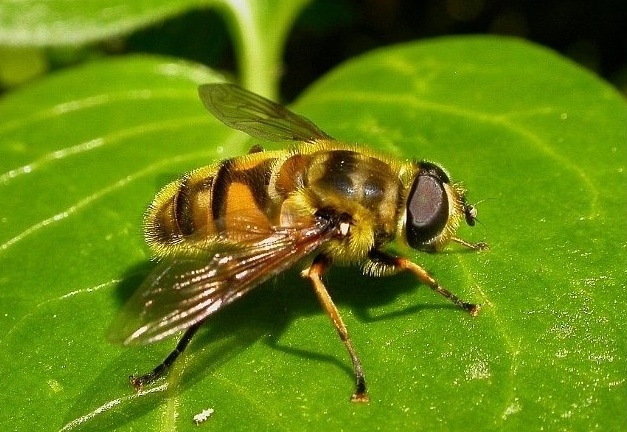
Myathropa

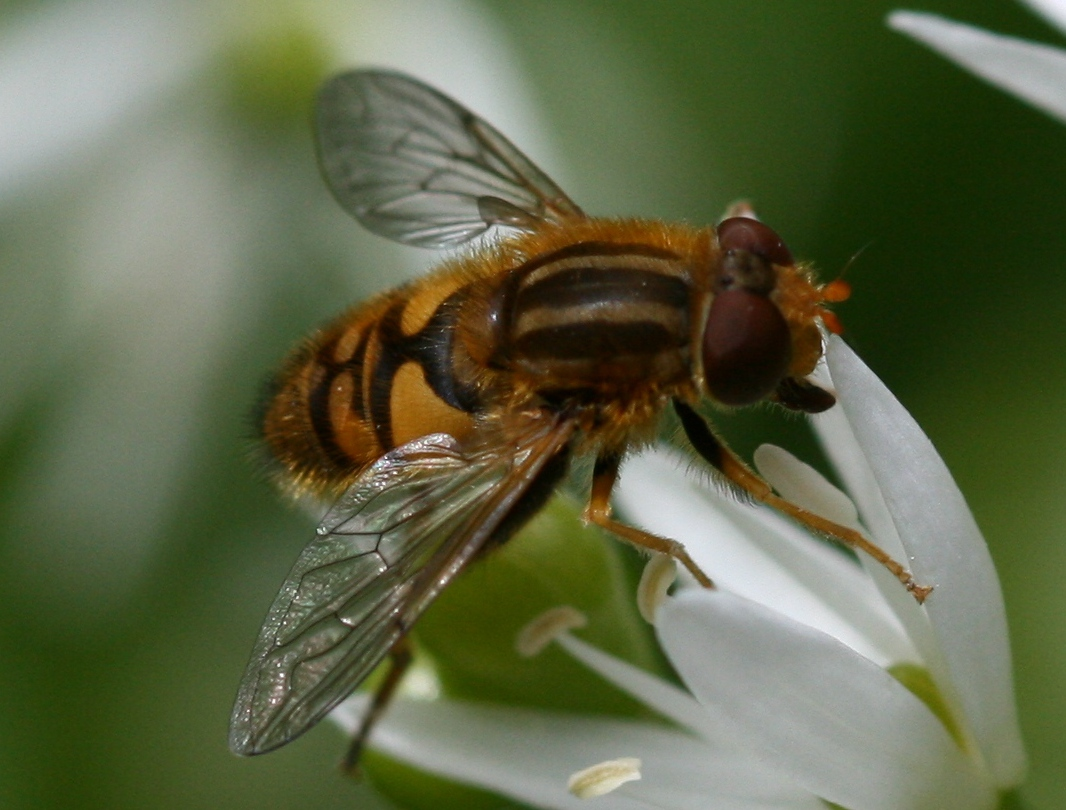
Parhelophilus

=== Tribe: Sericomyiini ===
- sometimes regarded as a subtribe of the Eristalini

- Pararctophila Herve-Bazin, 1914: OR PA
- Pseudovolucella Shiraki, 1930: OR PA
- Pyritis Hunter, 1897: NE
- Sericomyia (=Cinxia, Condidea, Tapetomyia)
  - Subgenera:
    - S. (Arctophila) Schiner, 1860
    - S. (Conosyrphus) Frey, 1915
    - S. (Sericomyia) Meigen, 1803
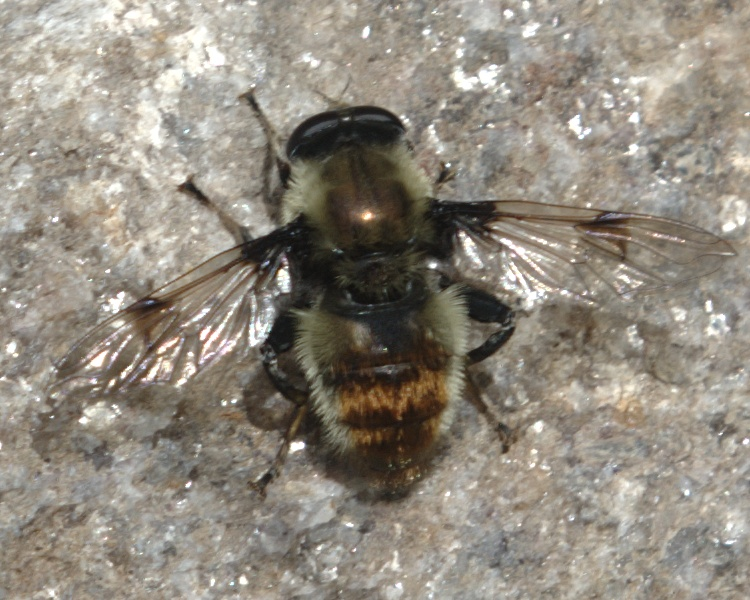
Arctophila

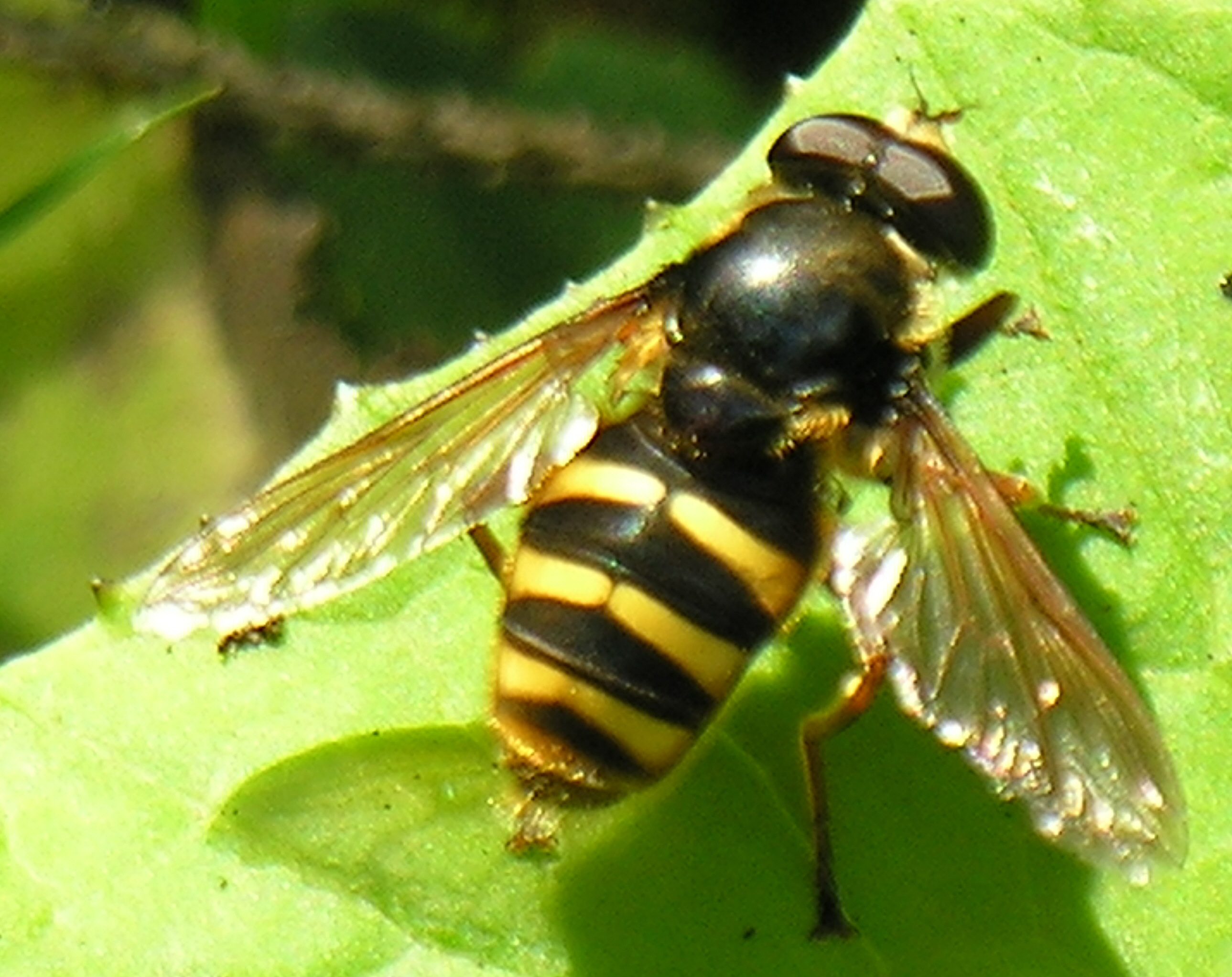
Sericomyia

=== Tribe: Eumerini ===
(=Merodontini, Medorontinae Edwards, 1915, Medorontinae Bezzi, 1915, Medorontidae Glumac & Vujic, 1990, Nausigasterinae Shannon, 1921)

- Alipumilio Shannon, 1927: NT
- Austrocheilosia Thompson, 2008: AU
- Azpeytia Walker, 1865: AU OR PA
- Cepa Thompson & Vockeroth, 2007 (=Xela Thompson, 1999)
- Eumerus Meigen, 1822 (=Amphoterus, Citibaena, Paragopsis): cosmopolitan
- Lyneborgimyia Doczkal & Pape, 2009
- Megatrigon Johnson, 1898
- Merodon Meigen, 1803 (=Lampetia): AF AU NE OR PA
  - Subgenera:
    - M. (Exmerodon) Becker, 1912
    - M. (Merodon) Meigen, 1803
- Nausigaster Shannon, 1921
- Platynochaetus Wiedemann, 1830
- Psilota Meigen, 1822 (=Emmyia): AU NE OR PA
  - Subgenera:
    - P. (Psilota) Meigen, 1822
    - P. (Psilotanycus)
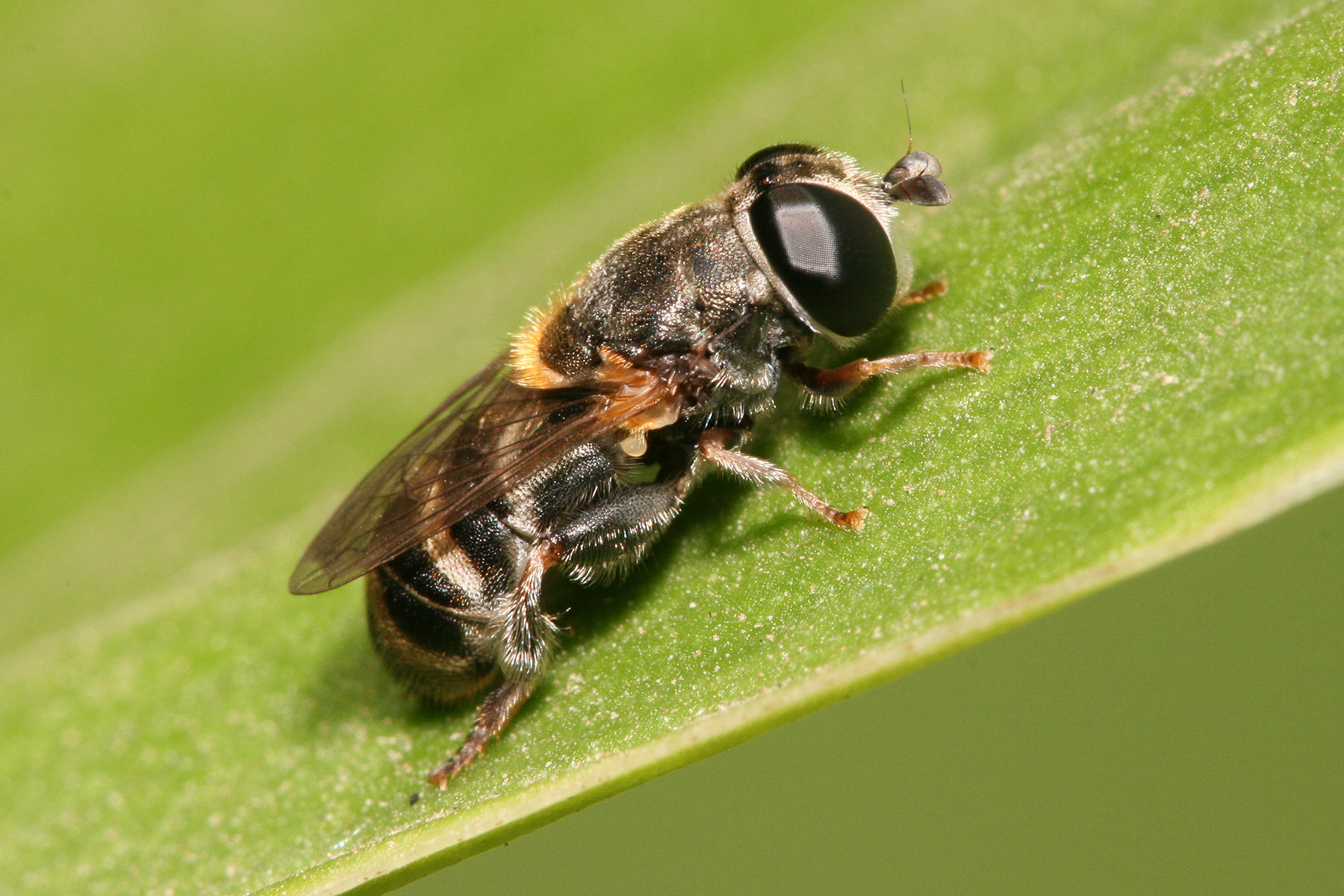
Eumerus

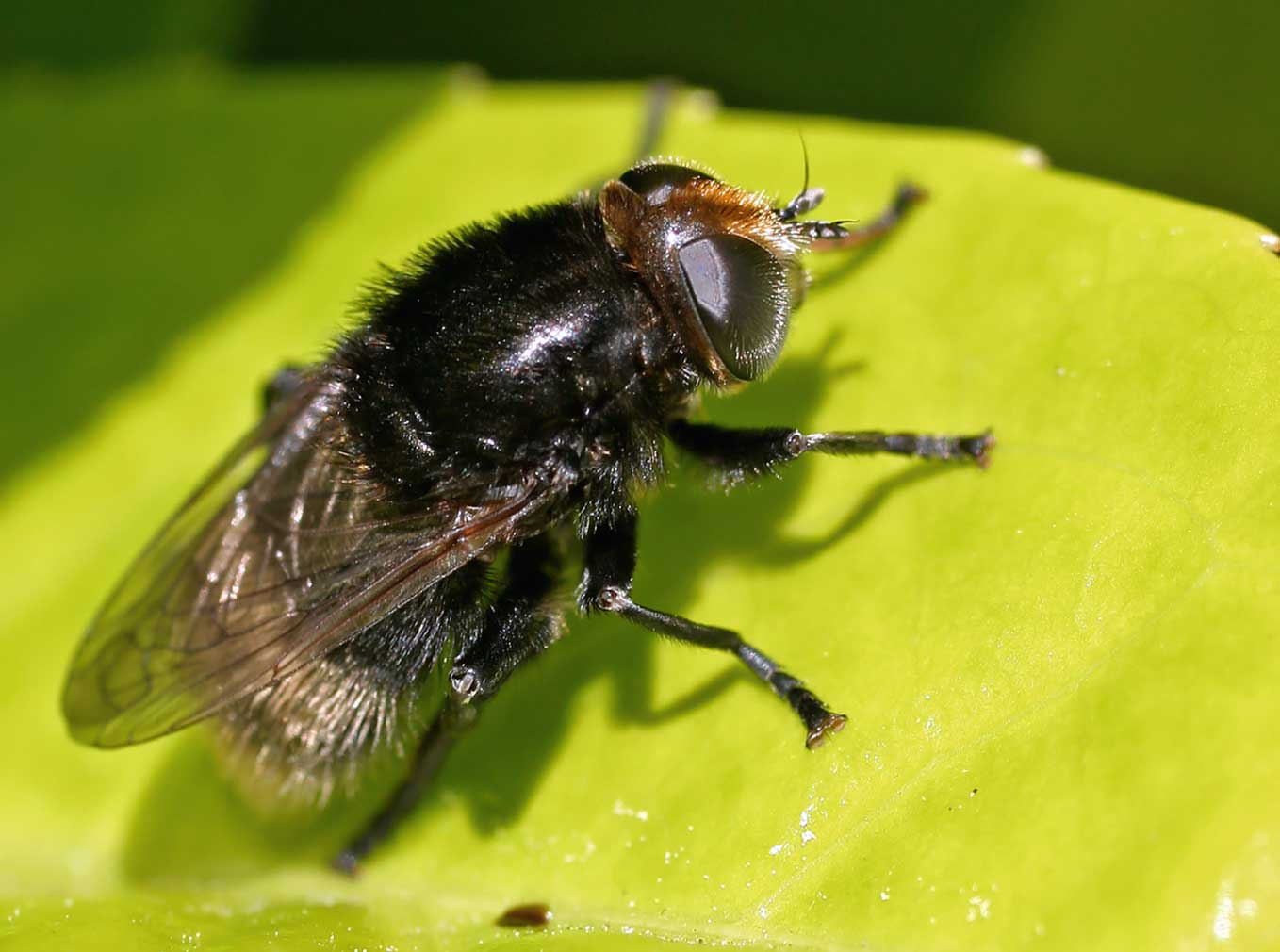
Merodon

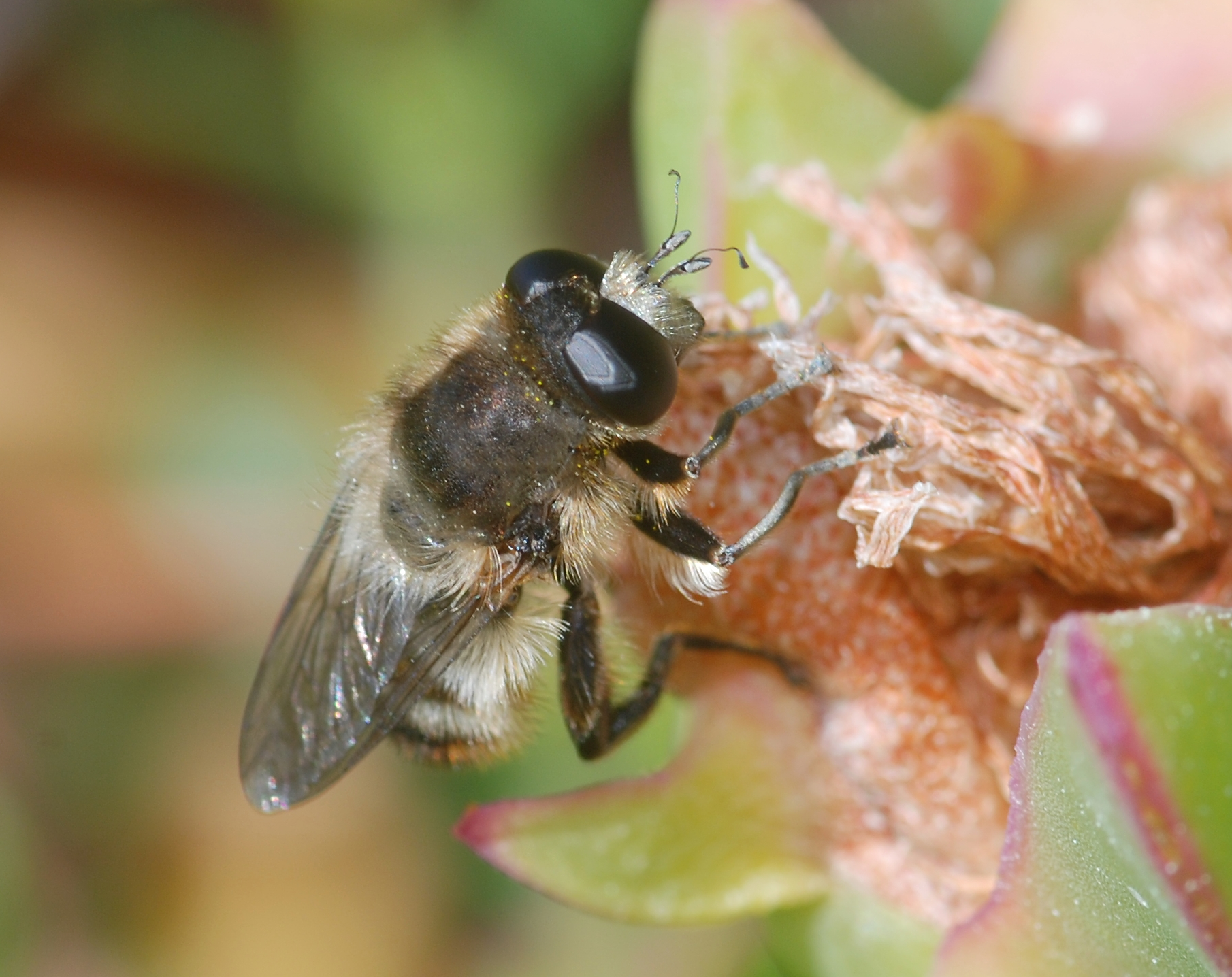
Platynochaetus

=== Tribe: Milesiini ===
(=Xylotini)

==== Subtribe: Blerina ====
- Blera Billberg, 1820 (=Cynorhina): NE OR PA
- Caliprobola Rondani, 1845: PA
- Cynorhinella Curran, 1922: NE
- Lejota Rondani, 1857 (=Chalcomyia): NE PA
- Philippimyia Shannon, 1926: NT
- Somula Macquart, 1847: NE
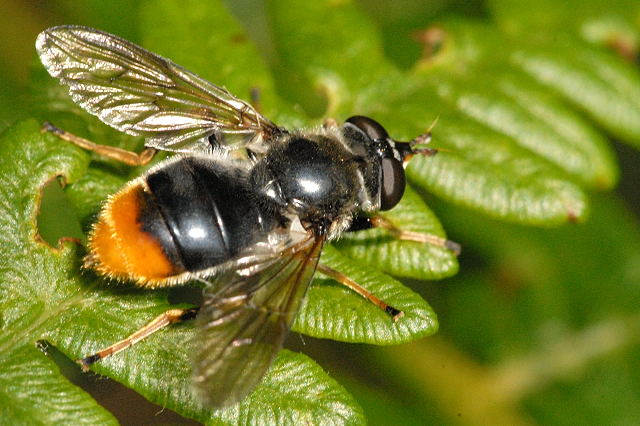
Blera

==== Subtribe: Criorhinina ====
- Criorhina Meigen, 1822 (=Brachymyia, Eurhinomallota, Romaleosyrphus): NE NT OR PA
- Deineches Walker, 1852: AU
- Flukea Etcheverry, 1966: NT
- Lycastris Walker, 1857: OR
- Malometasternum Shannon, 1927: AU
- Matsumyia Shiraki, 1949: OR PA
- Pseudopocota Mutin & Barkalov, 1995: PA
- Sphecomyia Latreille, 1829 (=Tyzenhauzia): NE PA
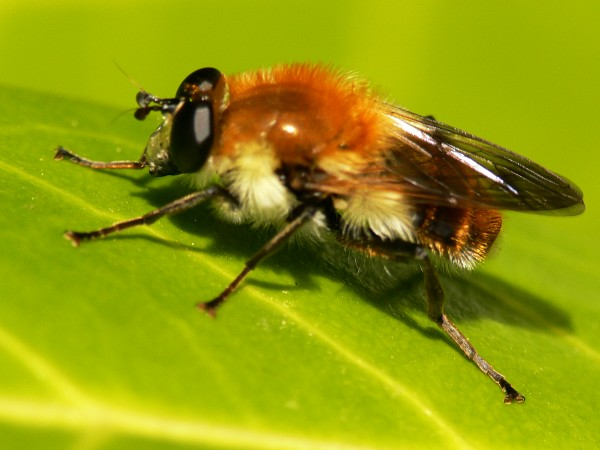
Criorhina

==== Subtribe: Milesiina ====
- Hemixylota Shannon & Aubertin, 1933: NT
- Milesia Latreille, 1804 (=Pogonosyrphus, Sphixea): cosmopolitan
- Spilomyia Meigen, 1803: NE NT OR PA
- Stilbosoma Philippi, 1865: NT
- Syrittosyrphus Hull, 1944: AF
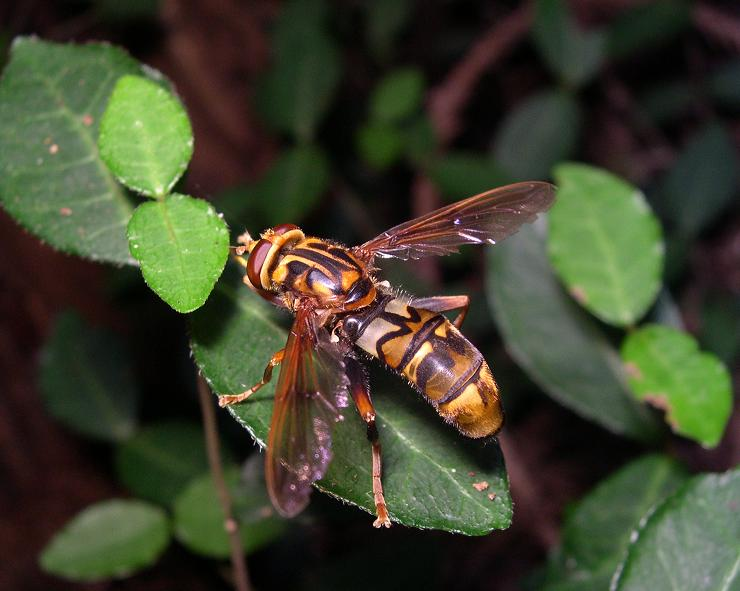
Milesia

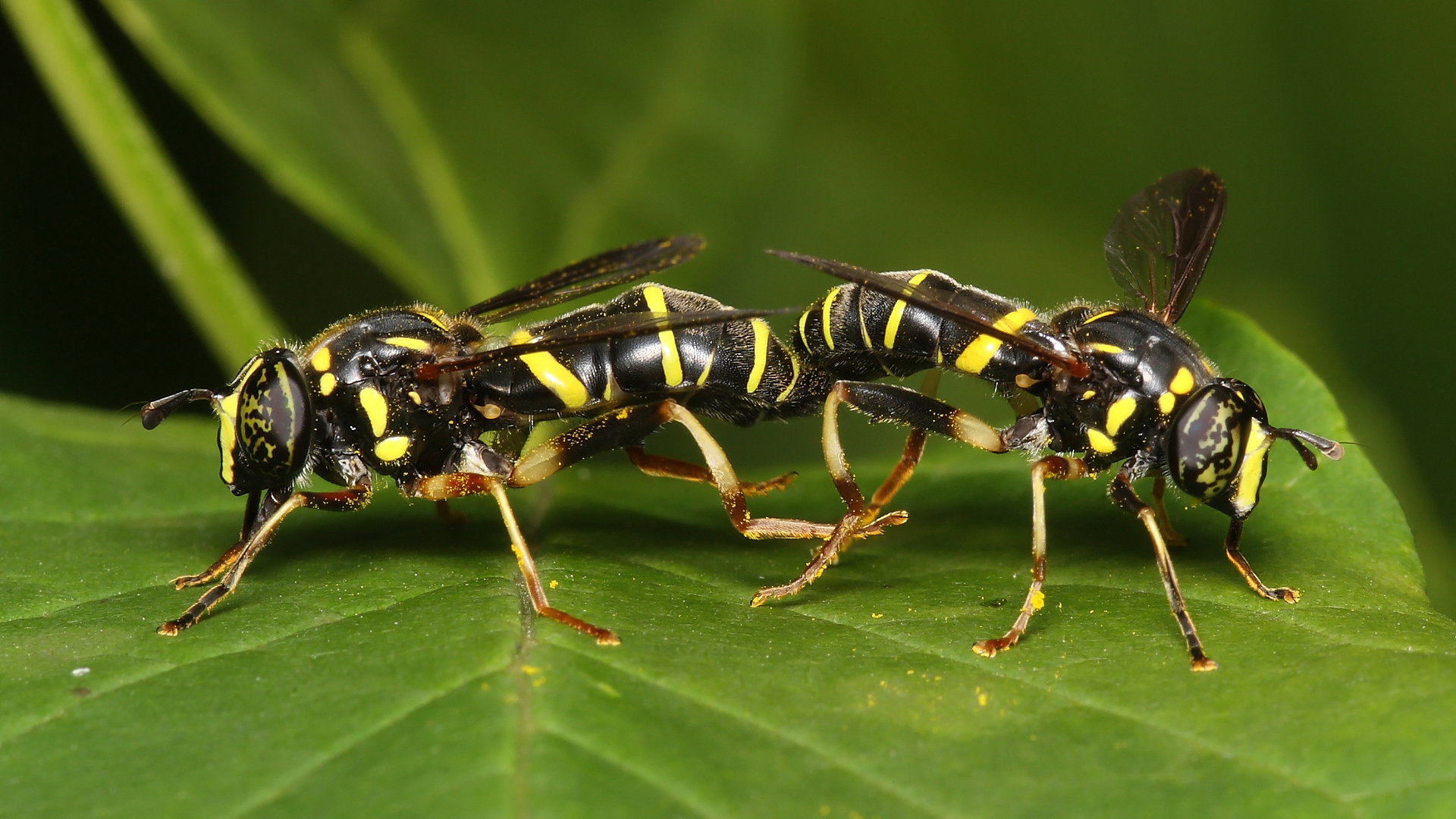
Spilomyia

==== Subtribe: Temnostomina ====
- Aneriophora Stuardo & Cortes, 1952: NT
- Odyneromyia : AU NT
  - Subgenera:
    - O. (Odyneromyia) Shannon & Aubertin, 1833
    - O. (Austroxylota)
- Palumbia (=Priomerus): NE OR PA
  - Subgenera:
    - P. (Korinchia) Edwards, 1919
    - P. (Palumbia) Rondani, 1865
- Pterallastes Loew, 1863 (=Pseudozetterstedtia): NE PA
- Takaomyia Herve-Bazin, 1914 (=Vespiomyia): OR PA
- Temnostoma Lepeletier & Serville, 1828: NE OR PA
- Teuchocnemis Osten Sacken, 1875: NE
- Valdiviomyia Vockeroth, 1976 (=Valdivia): NT
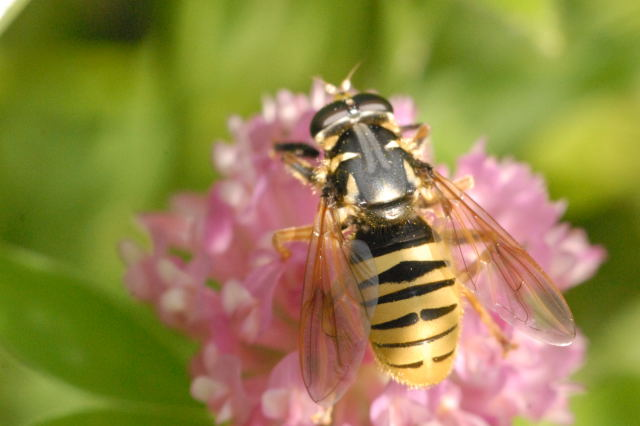
Temnostoma

==== Subtribe: Tropidiina ====
- Calcaretropidia Keiser, 1971: AF AU OR
- Macrozelima Stackelberg, 1930: OR PA
- Meropidia Hippa & Thompson, 1983: NT
- Nepenthosyrphus Meijere, 1932: OR
- Orthoprosopa : AU
  - Subgenera:
    - O. (Orthoprosopa) Macquart, 1850
    - O. (Paratropidia) Hull, 1949
- Senogaster Macquart, 1834: NT
- Syritta Lepeletier & Serville, 1828: cosmopolitan
- Tropidia : NE NT PA
  - Subgenera:
    - T. (Ortholophus)
    - T. (Tropidia) Meigen, 1822
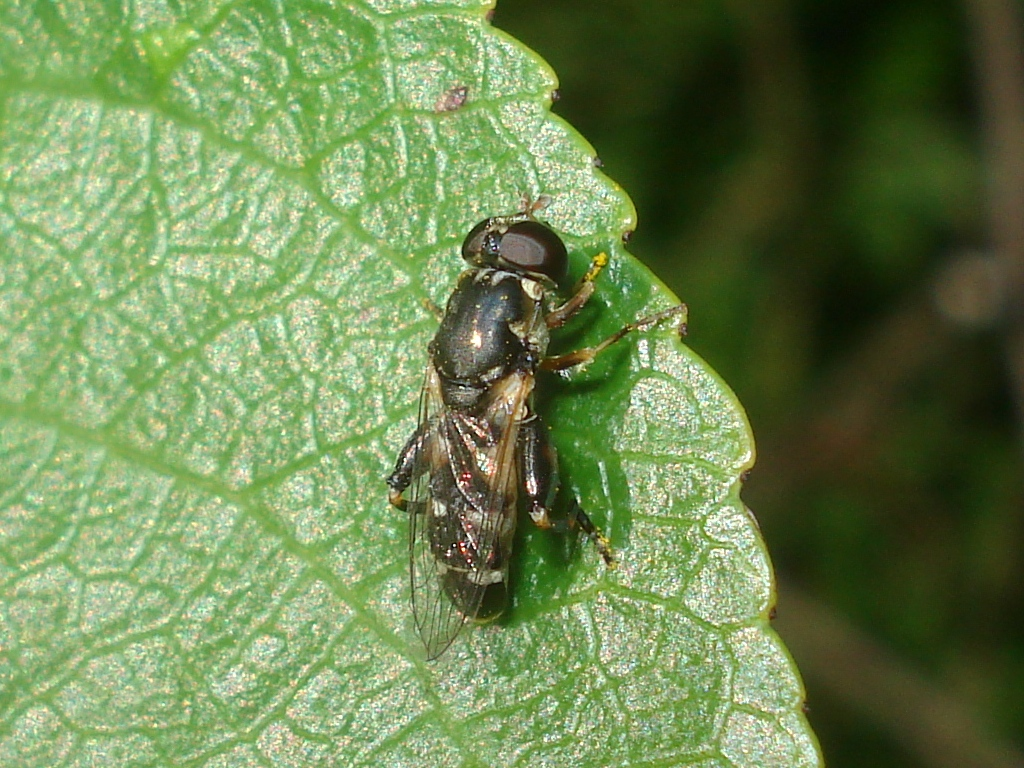
Syritta

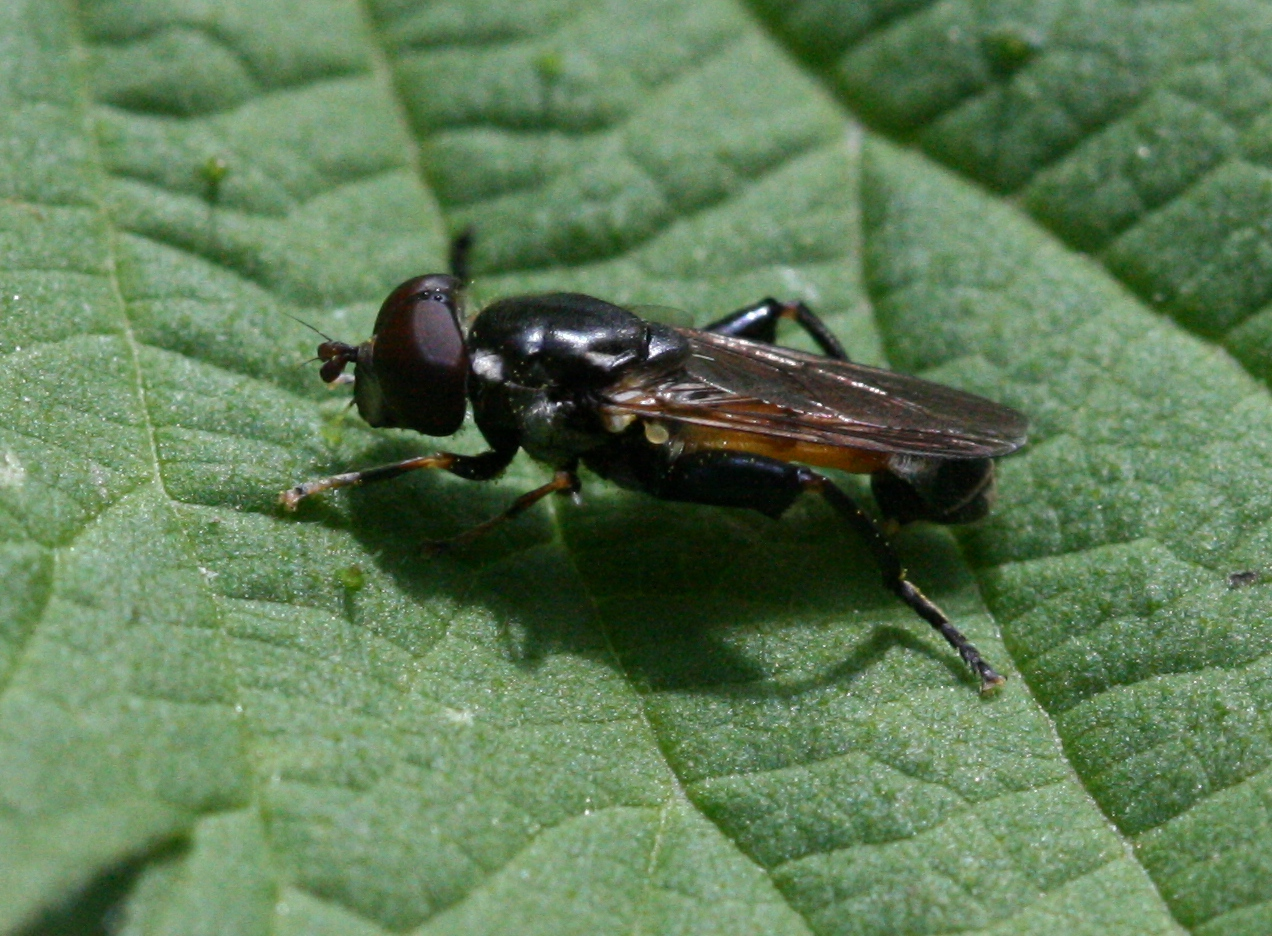
Tropidia

==== Subtribe: Xylotina ====
- Brachypalpus : NE PA
  - Subgenera:
    - B. (Brachypalpus) Macquart, 1834
    - B. (Crioprora) Osten Sacken, 1878
- Cacoceria Hull, 1936 (=Cacomyia): NT
- Chalcosyrphus : NE OR PA
  - Subgenera:
    - C. (Chalcosyrphus) Curran, 1925
    - C. (Cheiroxylota) Hull, 1949
    - C. (Dimorphoxylota) Hippa, 1978
    - C. (Hardimyia) Ferguson, 1926
    - C. (Neplas) Porter, 1927
    - C. (Neploneura) Hippa, 1978
    - C. (Spheginoides) Szilady, 1939
    - C. (Syrittoxylota) Hippa, 1978
    - C. (Xylotina) Hippa, 1978
    - C. (Xylotodes) Shannon, 1926
    - C. (Xylotomima) Shannon, 1926
- Hadromyia : NE PA
  - Subgenera:
    - H. (Chrysosomidia) Curran, 1934
    - H. (Hadromyia) Williston, 1882
- Macrometopia Philippi, 1865: NT
- Pocota Lepeletier & Serville, 1828: NE PA
- Sterphus (=Tatuomyia, Zonemyia): NT
  - Subgenera:
    - S. (Ceriogaster) Williston, 1888
    - S. (Crepidomyia) Shannon, 1926
    - S. (Mutillimyia) Hull, 1943
    - S. (Sterphus) Philippi, 1865
    - S. (Telus) Thompson, 1973
- Xylota (=Zelima): AF AU NE OR PA
  - Subgenera:
    - X. (Ameroxylota) Hippa, 1978
    - X. (Brachypalpoides) Hippa, 1978
    - X. (Hovaxylota) Keiser, 1971
    - X. (Sterphoides) Hippa, 1978
    - X. (Xylota) Meigen, 1822
Chalcosyrphus

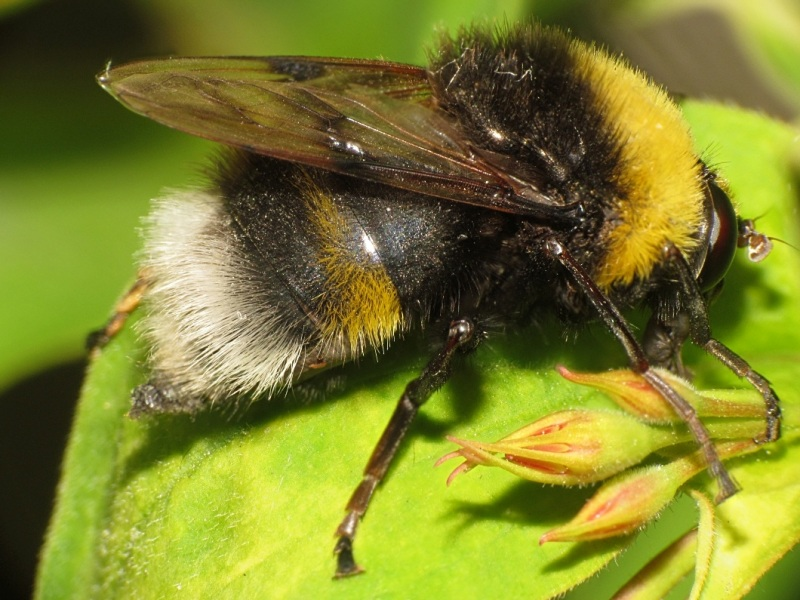
Pocota

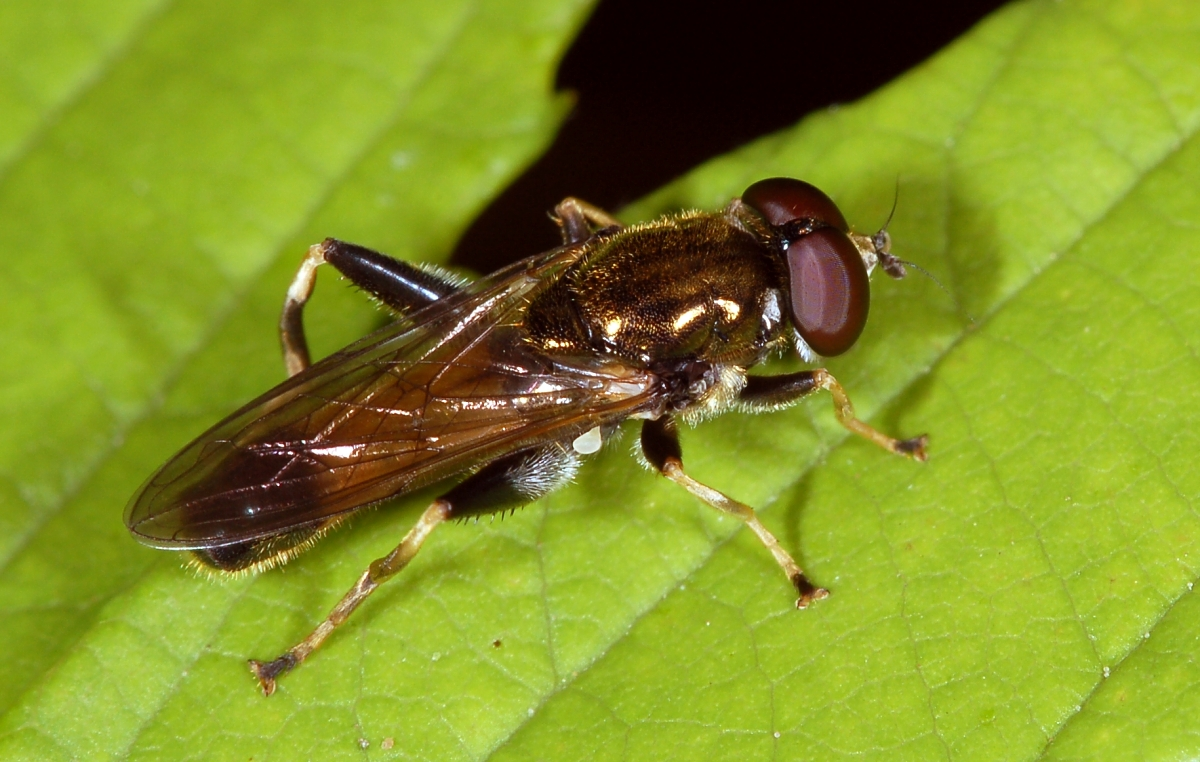
Xylota

=== Tribe: Rhingiini ===
(=Cheilosiini Cockerell, 1917)

==== Subtribe: Cheilosiina ====
- Cheilosia (=Cartosyrphus, Chilomyia): NE OR PA
  - Subgenera:
    - C. (Cheilosia) Meigen, 1822
    - C. (Conicheila) Barkalov, 2002
    - C. (Convocheila) Barkalov, 2002
    - C. (Eucartosyrphus) Barkalov, 2002
    - C. (Floccocheila) Barkalov, 2002
    - C. (Montanocheila) Barkalov, 2002
    - C. (Nephomyia) Matsumura, 1916
    - C. (Pollinocheila) Barkalov, 2002
    - C. (Rubrocheila) Barkalov, 2002
- Endoiasimyia Bigot, 1882 (=Sonanomyia): OR PA
- Ferdinandea Rondani, 1844: NE OR PA
- Hiatomyia Shannon, 1922: NE
- Portevinia Goffe, 1944: PA
- Taeniochilosia Oldenberg, 1916: PA

==== Subtribe: Pelecocerina ====
- Ischyroptera Pokorny, 1887: PA
- Macropelecocera Stackelberg, 1952: PA
- Pelecocera (=Euceratomyia): NE PA
  - Subgenera:
    - P. (Chamaesyrphus) Mik, 1895
    - P. (Pelecocera) Meigen, 1822
- Psarochilosia Stackelberg, 1952: PA

==== Subtribe: Psarina ====
- Psarus Latreille, 1804: PA

==== Subtribe: Rhingiina ====
- Rhingia : AF NE NT OR PA
  - Subgenera:
    - R. (Eorhingia) Hull, 1949
    - R. (Rhingia) Scopoli, 1763
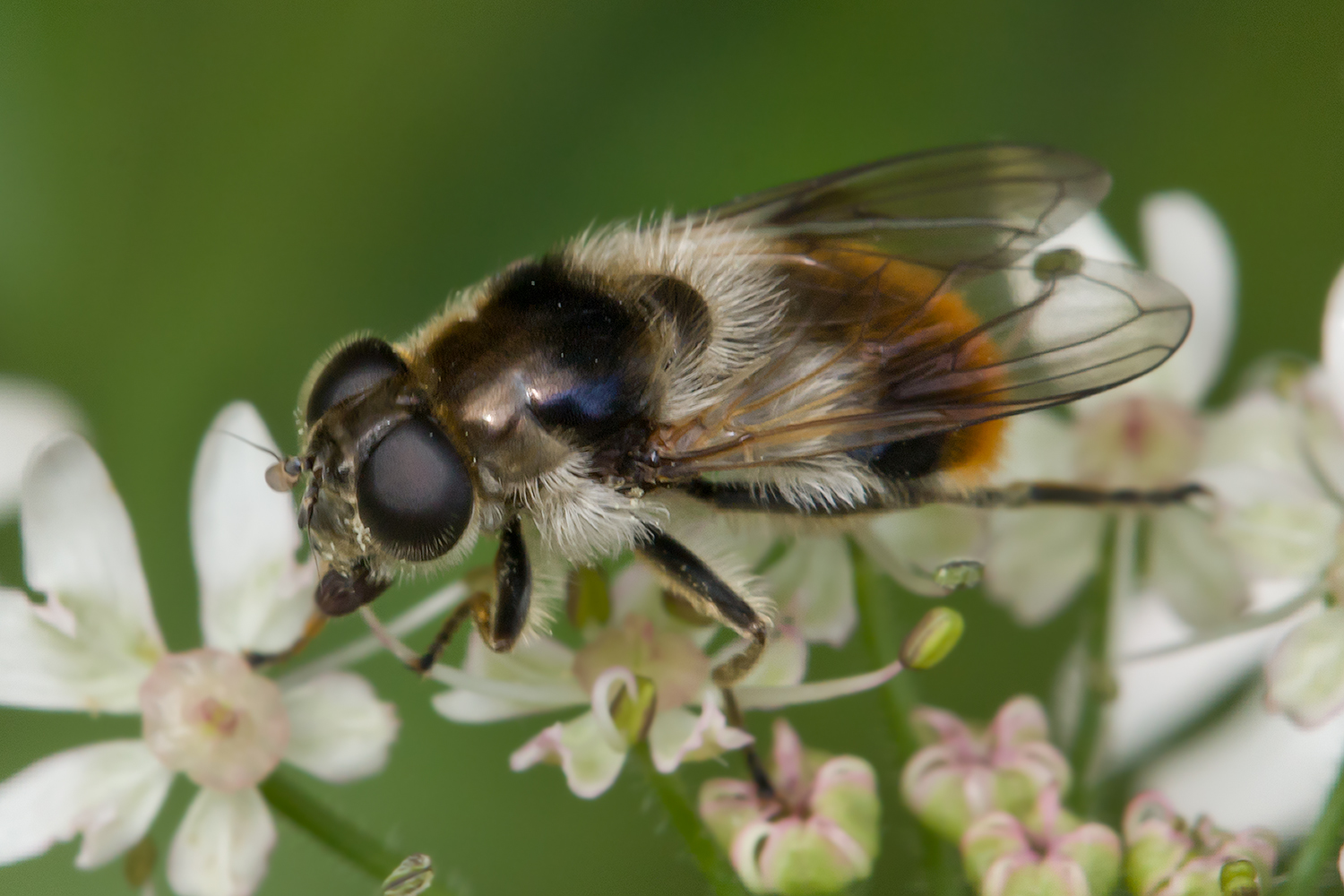
Cheilosia illustrata

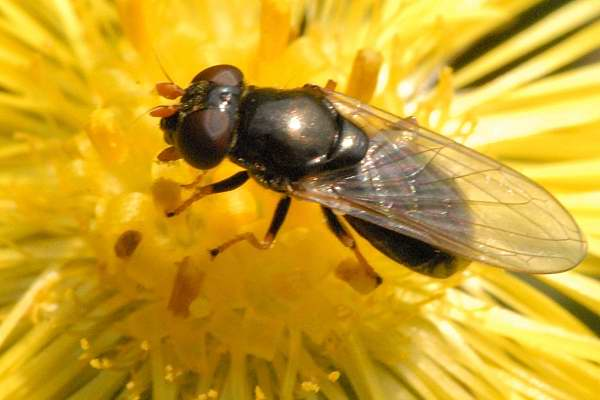
Cheilosia pagana

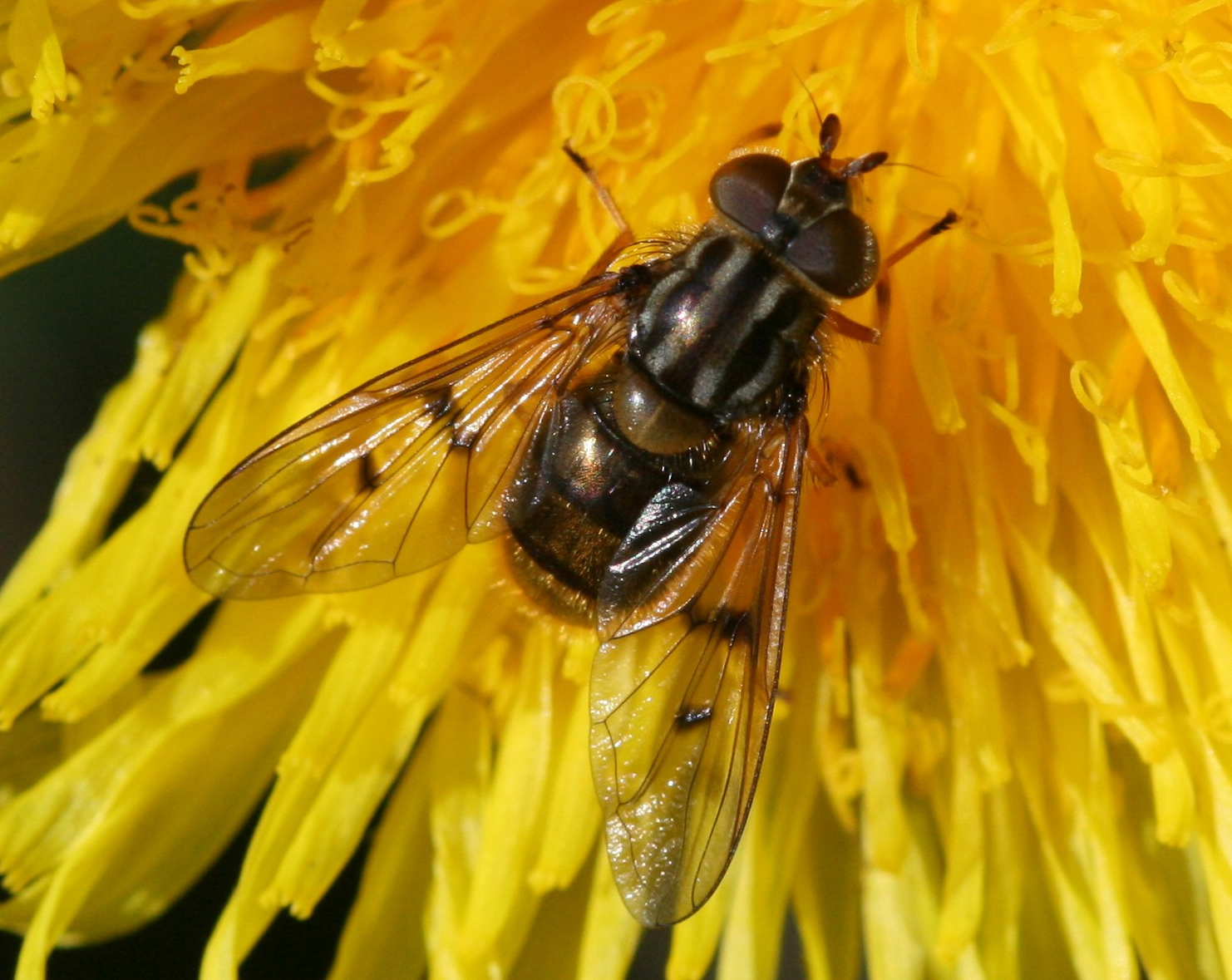
Ferdinandea

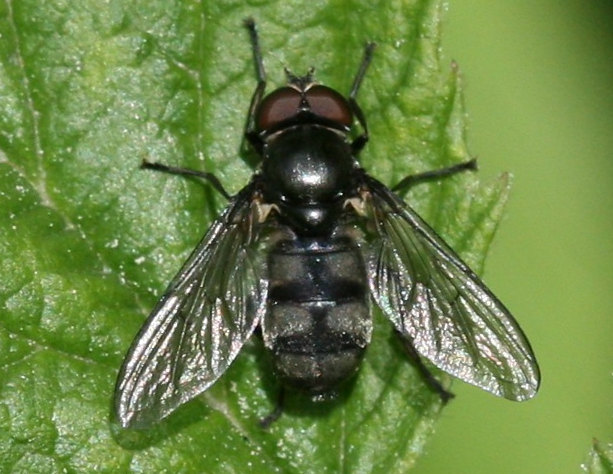
Portevinia

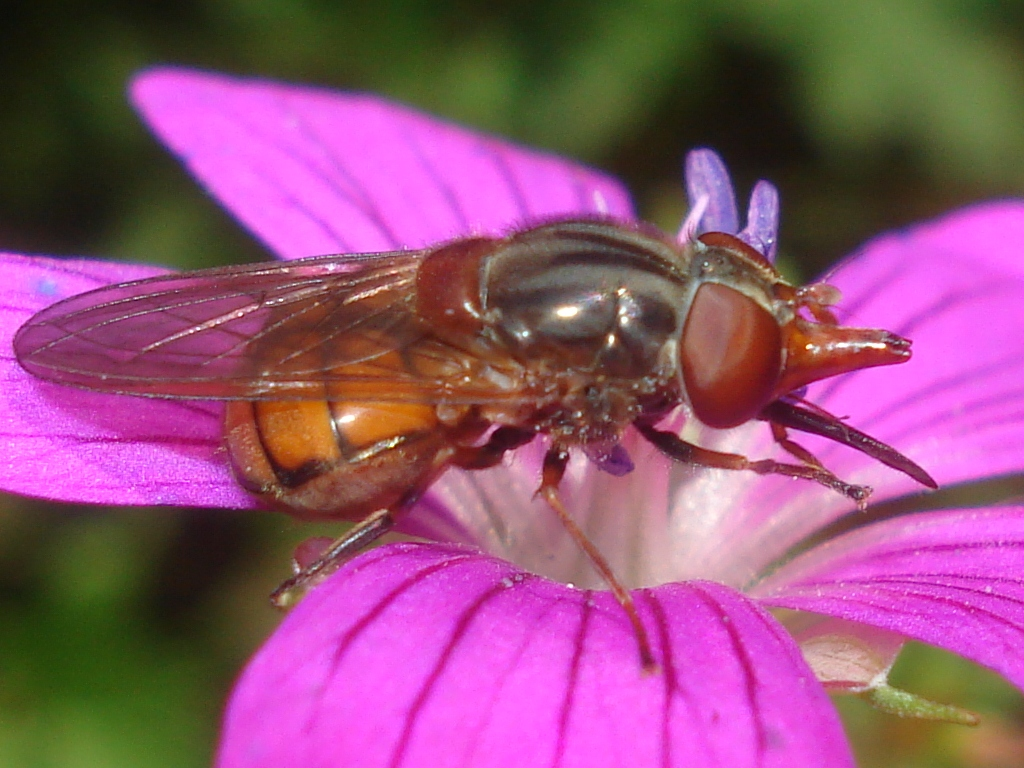
Rhingia

=== Tribe: Volucellini ===
- Copestylum (=Camerania, Glaurotricha): AU NE NT
  - Subgenera:
    - C. (Apophysophora) Williston, 1888
    - C. (Copestylum) Macquart, 1846
    - C. (Lepidopsis) Curran, 1925
    - C. (Megametopon) Giglio-Tos, 1891
    - C. (Phalacromyia)
    - C. (Tachinosyrphus) Hull, 1936
    - C. (Viereckomyia) Curran, 1925
    - C. (Volosyrpha) Shannon, 1928
    - C. (Volucellosia) Curran, 1930
- Graptomyza Wiedemann, 1820 (=Baryterocera, Ptilostylomyia): AF AU OR PA
- Ornidia Lepeletier & Serville, 1828: AF NE NT OR
- Volucella Geoffroy, 1762 (=Temnocera): NE OR PA
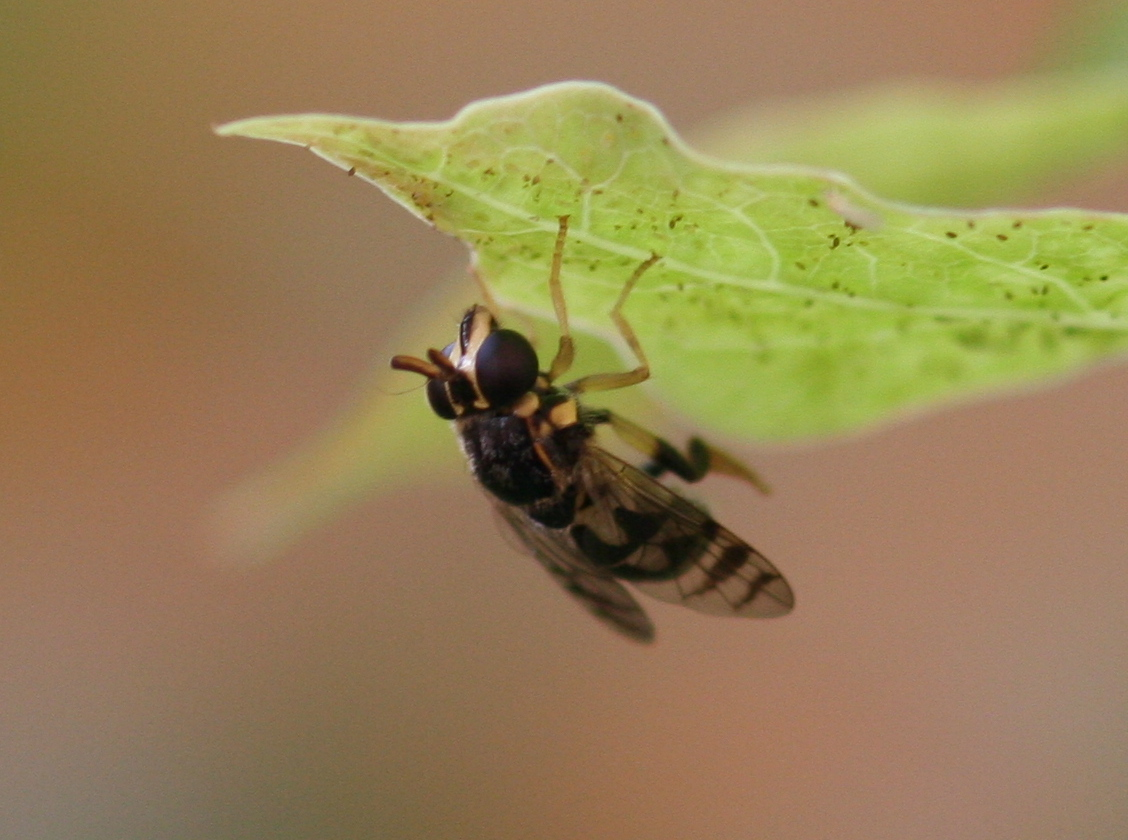
Graptomyza

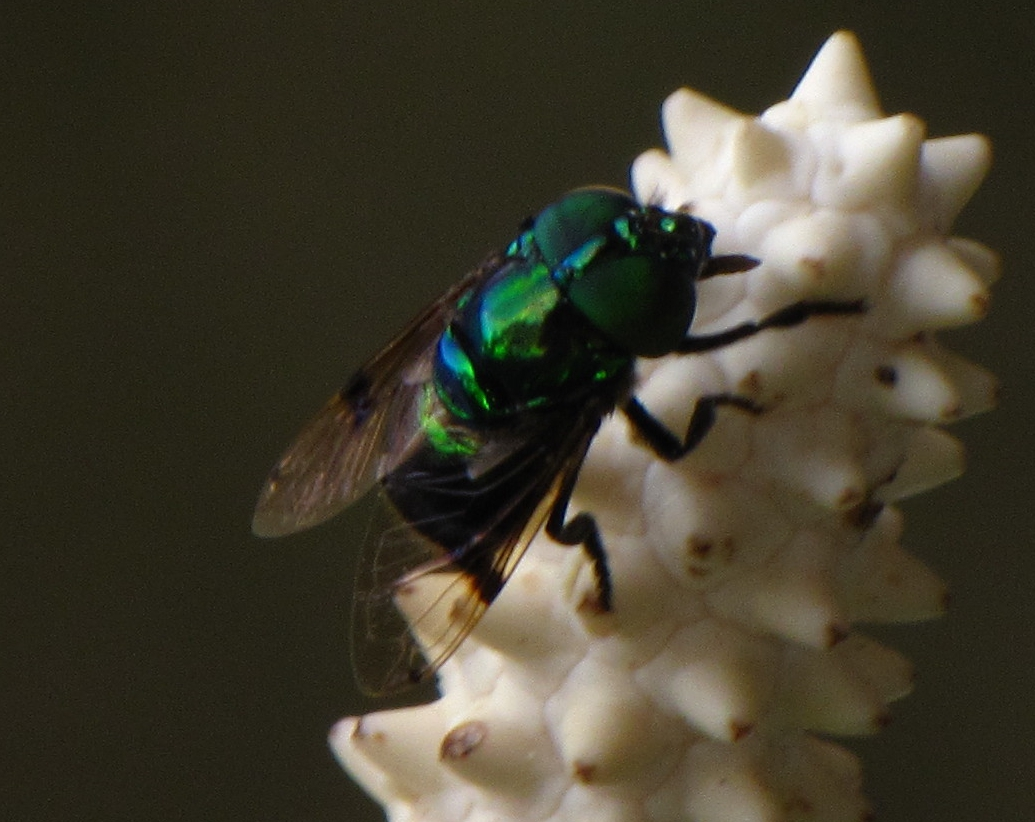
Ornidia

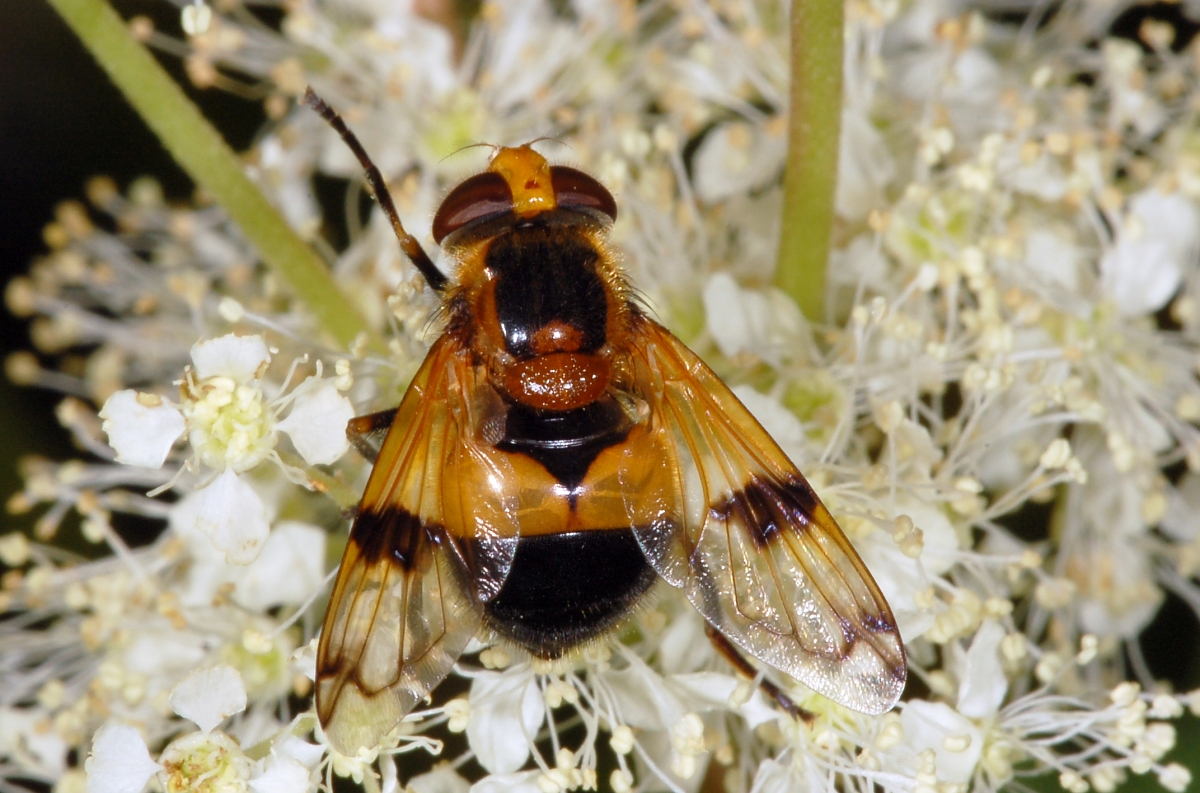
Volucella

== Microdontinae ==
The arrangement of genera here follows the extensive revision carried out by Reemer & Ståhls (2013).

=== Tribe: Microdontini ===
- Afromicrodon Thompson, 2008: AF
- Archimicrodon
  - Subgenera:
    - A. (Archimicrodon) Hull, 1945: OR
    - A. (Hovamicrodon) Keiser, 1971
- Aristosyrphus (=Protoceratophya): NT
  - Subgenera:
    - A. (Aristosyrphus) Curran, 1941
    - A. (Eurypterosyrphus) Barretto & Lane, 1947
- Bardistopus Mann, 1920: AU
- Carreramyia Doesburg, 1966: NT
- Ceratophya Wiedemann, 1824: NT
- Ceratrichomyia Séguy, 1951: AF
- Ceriomicrodon Hull, 1937: NT
- Cervicorniphora Hull, 1945: AU
- Chrysidimyia Hull, 1937
- Domodon Reemer, 2013: NT
- Furcantenna Cheng, 2008: OR
- Heliodon Reemer, 2013: OR
- Hypselosyrphus Hull, 1937: NT
- Indascia Keiser, 1958: OR
- Kryptopyga Hull, 1944
- Laetodon Reemer, 2013: NT
- Masarygus Brethes, 1909: NT
- Menidon Reemer, 2013: NT
- Mermerizon Reemer, 2013: NT
- Metadon Reemer, 2013: OR AF AU
- Microdon
  - Subgenera:
    - M. (Chymophila) Macquart, 1834 (=Eumicrodon): NE NT
    - M. (Dimeraspis) Newman, 1838
    - M. (Megodon) Keiser, 1971
    - M. (Microdon) Meigen, 1803
    - M. (Myiacerapis) Hull, 1949
    - M. (Syrphipogon) Hull, 1937
- Mixogaster Macquart, 1842: NE NT
- Nothomicrodon Wheeler, 1924: NT
- Oligeriops Hull, 1937
- Omegasyrphus Giglio-Tos, 1891: NE NT
- Paragodon Thompson, 1969: NT
- Paramicrodon Meijere, 1913 (=Myxogasteroides, Nannomyrmecomyia, Syrphinella): AU NT OR
- Paramixogaster Brunetti, 1923 (=Paramixogasteroides, Tanaopicera): AU OR
- Parocyptamus Shiraki, 1930
- Peradon Reemer, 2013: NT
- Piruwa Reemer, 2013: NT
- Pseudomicrodon Hull, 1937
- Ptilobactrum Bezzi, 1915
- Rhoga Walker, 1857 (=Papiliomyia): NT
- Rhopalosyrphus Giglio-Tos, 1891 (=Holmbergia): NT
- Schizoceratomyia Carrera, Lopes & Lane, 1947 (=Johnsoniodon): NT
- Serichlamys Curran, 1925: NE NT
- Stipomorpha Hull, 1945: NT
- Sulcodon Reemer, 2013: OR
- Surimyia Reemer, 2008 : NT (Note: The genus was defined by Reemer (2008) to include two newly described species from Suriname, Surimyia minutula (= Paragodon minutulus) and Surimyia rolanderi. The review is quoted by Cheng & Thompson (2008) but not reported in BDWD where the species S. minutula is placed in the genus Paragodon.)
- Thompsodon Reemer, 2013: NT
- Ubristes Walker, 1852 (=Hypselosyrphus, Stipomorpha): NT

=== Tribe: Spheginobacchini ===
- Spheginobaccha Shiraki, 1930 de Meijere, 1908
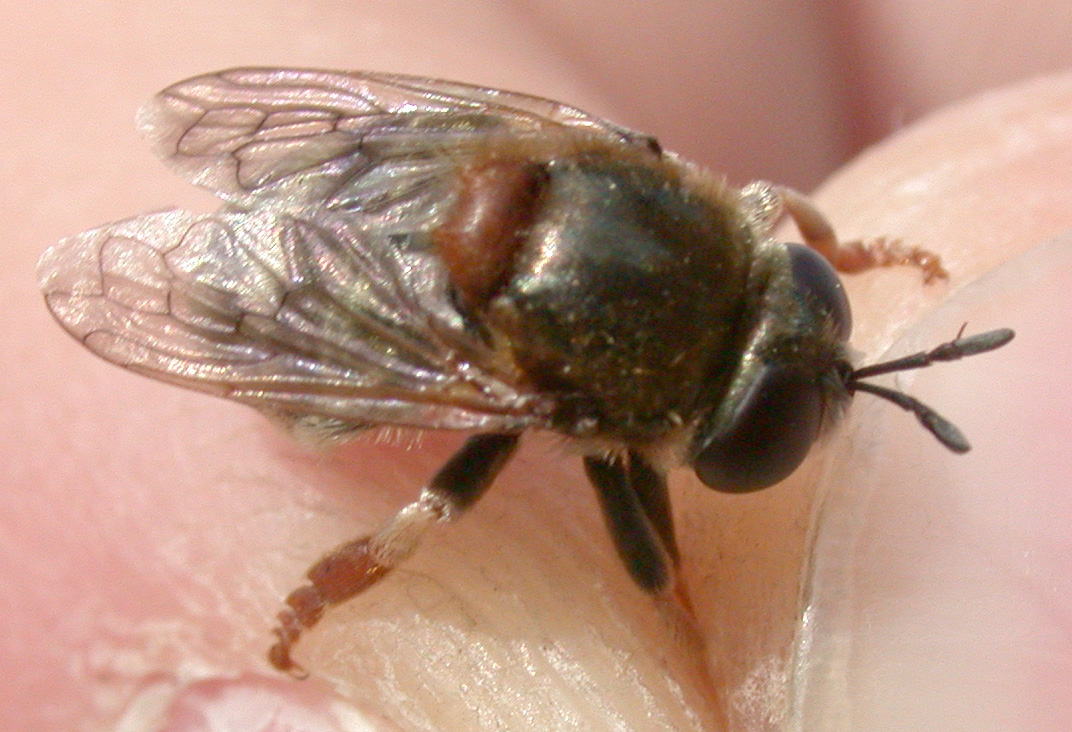
Microdon

== Pipizinae ==
The subfamily Pipizinae was formerly considered a tribe within Eristalinae, but a recent phylogenetic analysis suggests it should be ranked as a separate subfamily (Mengual, 2015).

- Cryptopipiza Mutin, 1998
- Heringia (=Cnemodon): NE PA
  - Subgenera:
    - H. (Heringia) Rondani, 1856
    - H. (Neocnemodon) Goffe, 1944
- †Oligopipiza Nidergas, Hadrava, Nel et al., 2018 (a fossil genus from Middle Oligocene ~28 MYR-BP): PA
- Pipiza Fallén, 1810 (=Pseudopipiza): NE NT PA
- Pipizella Rondani, 1856: PA
- Trichopsomyia Williston, 1888 (=Halictomyia): NE NT OR PA
- Triglyphus Loew, 1840: AU OR PA
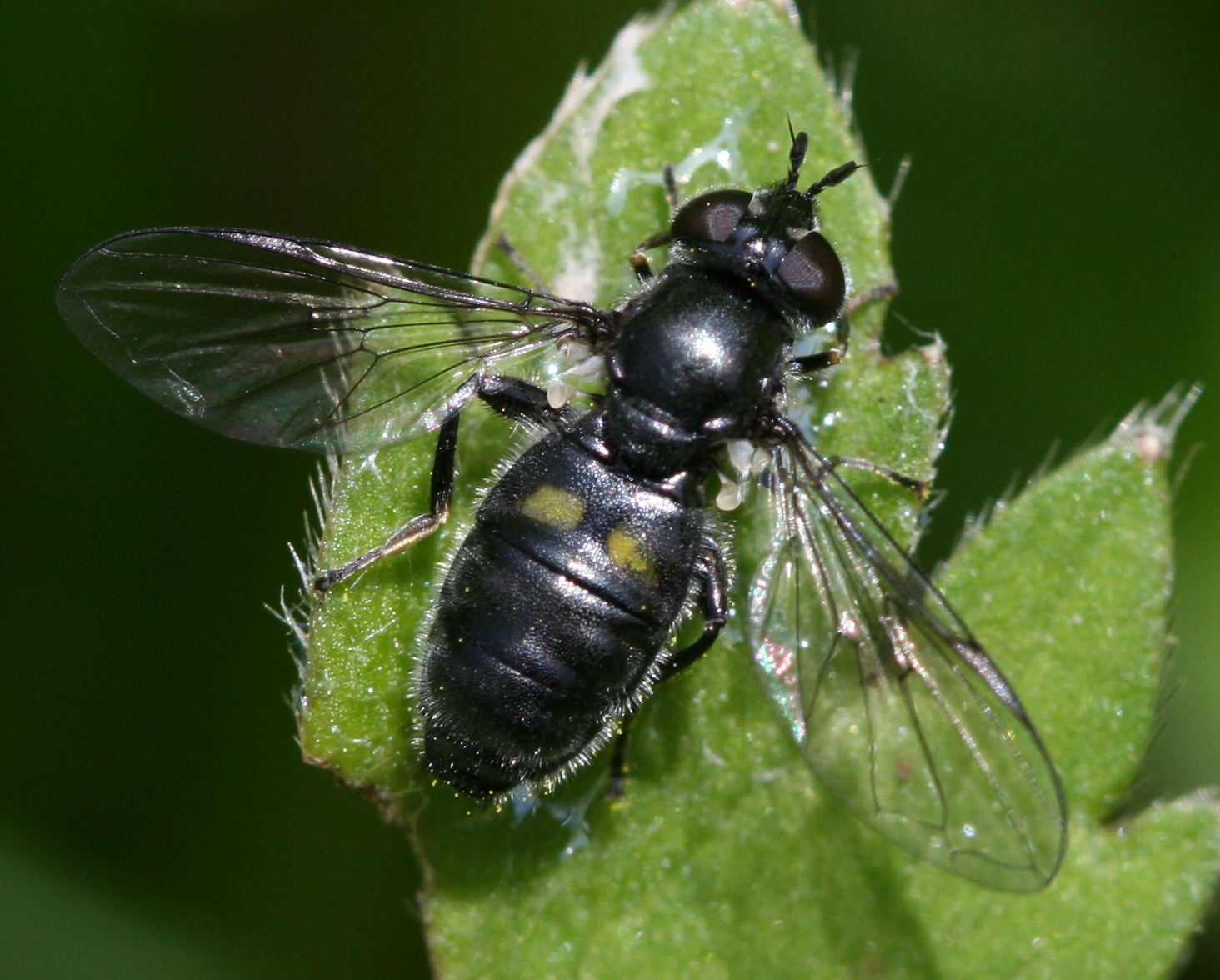
Pipiza

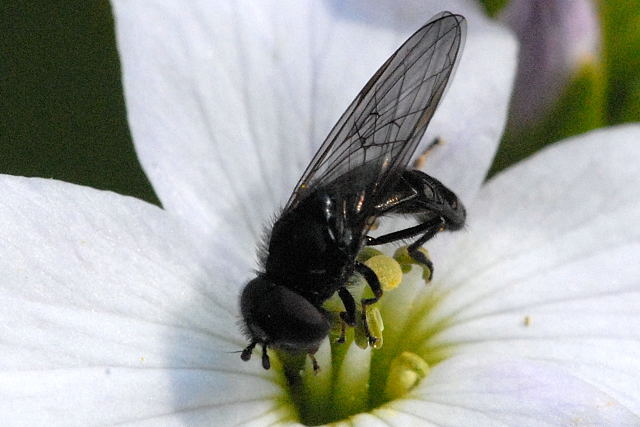
Heringia

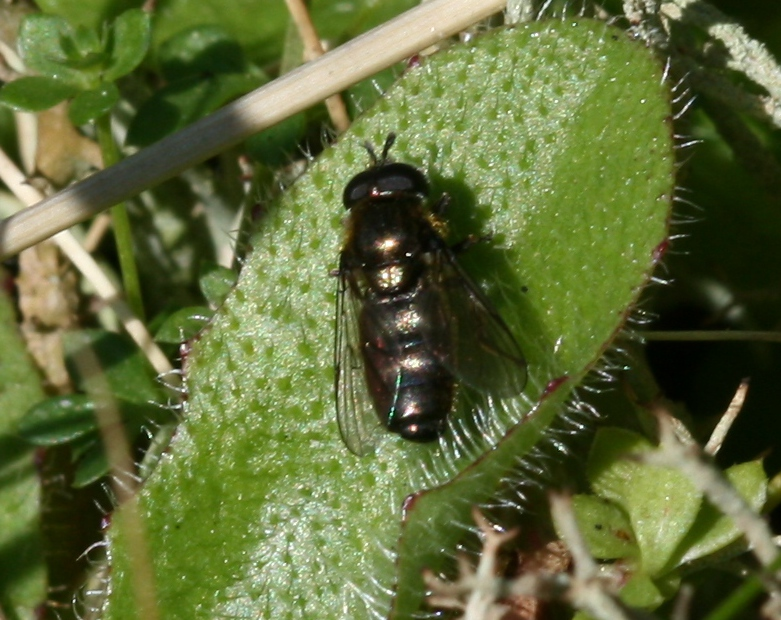
Pipizella

== Syrphinae ==
The subfamily Syrphinae is subdivided into 4 well established tribes. For table of genera, subgenera, authors and types see Mengual et al (2008)

=== Tribe: Bacchini ===
(=Melanostomatini)

- Argentinomyia Lynch Arribalzaga, 1891 (=Braziliana, Rhysops): NT
- Baccha Fabricius, 1805: NE OR PA
- Leucopodella Hull, 1949: NE NT
- Melanostoma Schiner, 1860 (=Plesia): AF AU NE OR PA
- Platycheirus (=Stenocheilosia): AU NE NT OR PA
  - Subgenera:
    - P. (Carposcalis) Enderlein, 1938
    - P. (Eocheilosia) Hull, 1949
    - P. (Pachysphyria) Enderlein, 1938
    - P. (Platycheirus) Lepeletier & Serville, 1828
    - P. (Pseudoplatychirus) Doesburg, 1955
- Pyrophaena Schiner, 1860
- Rohdendorfia Smirnov, 1924: PA
- Spazigaster Rondani, 1843: PA
- Syrphocheilosia Stackelberg, 1864: PA
- Talahua Fluke, 1945: NT
- Tuberculanostoma Fluke, 1943: NT PA
- Xanthandrus (=Indosyrphus): cosmopolitan
  - Subgenera:
    - X. (Afroxanthandrus) Kassebeer, 2000
    - X. (Androsyrphus) Thompson, 1981
    - X. (Xanthandrus) Verrall, 1901
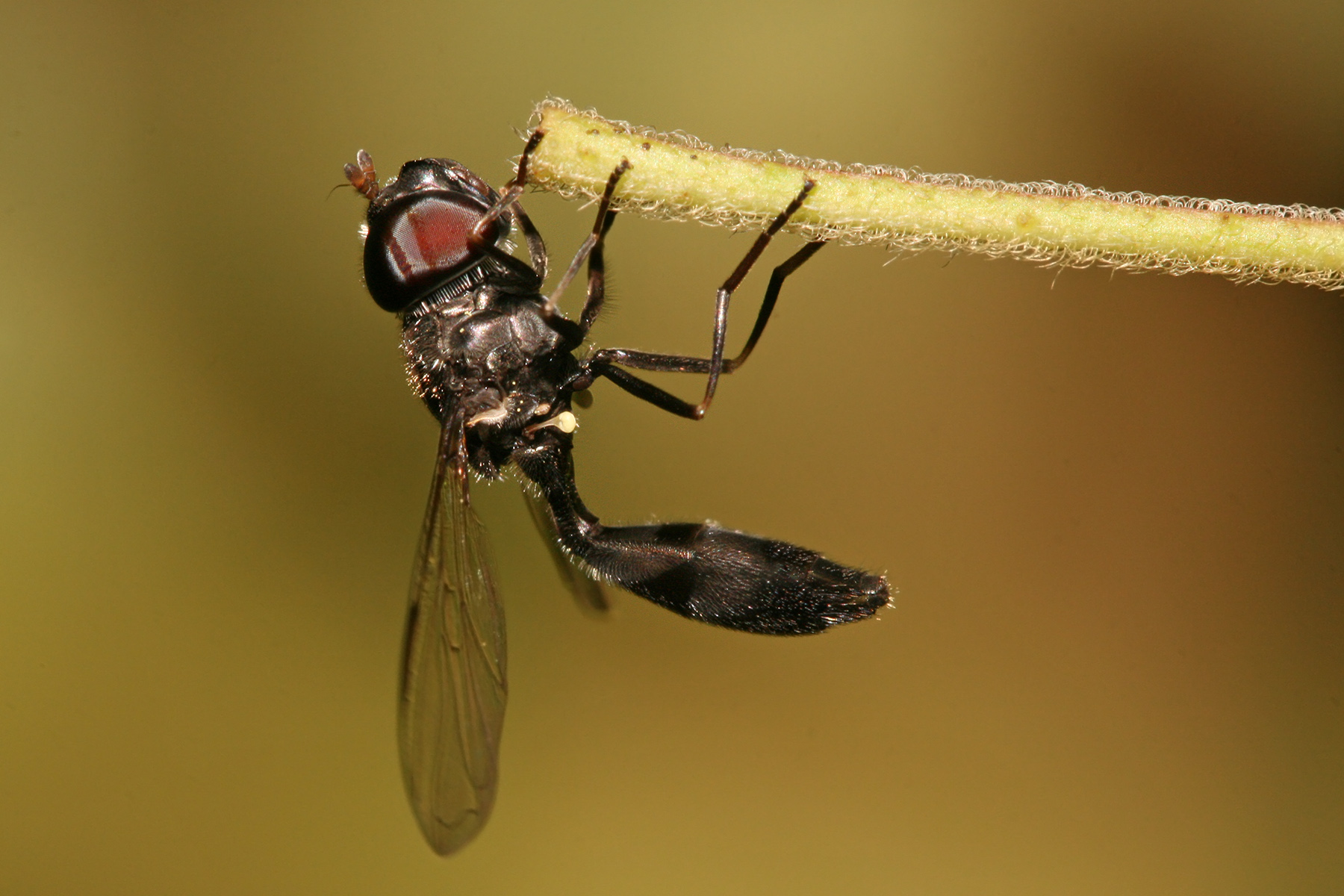
Baccha

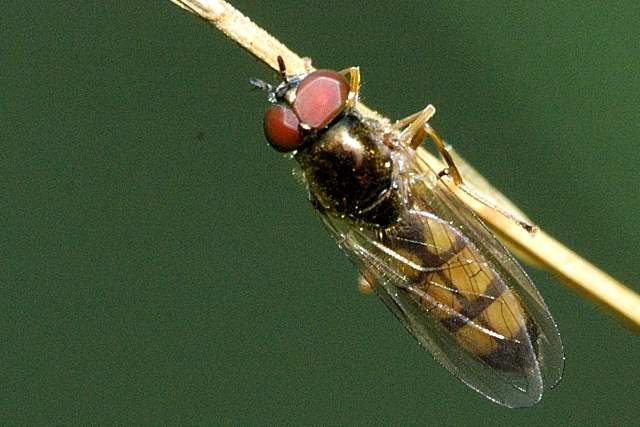
Melanostoma

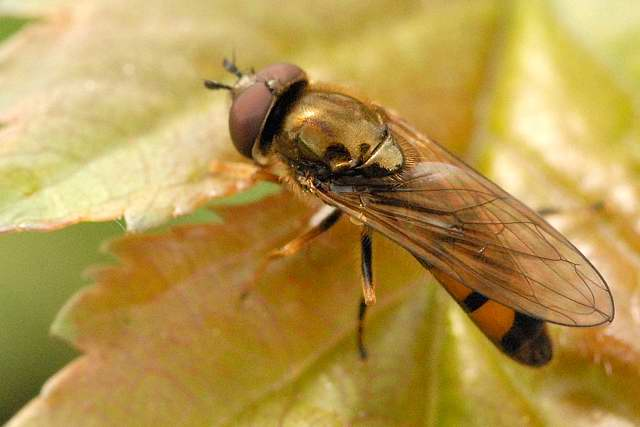
Platycheirus

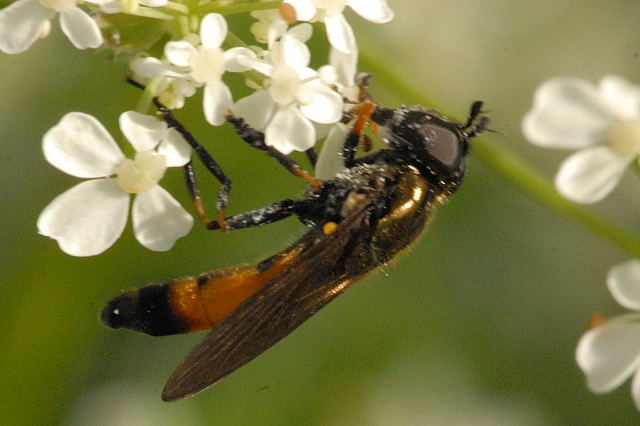
Pyrophaena

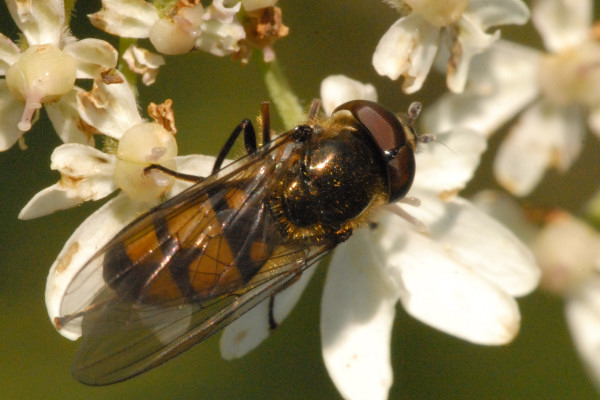
Xanthandrus

=== Tribe: Paragini ===
- Paragus : AF AU NE OR PA
  - Subgenera:
    - P. (Afroparagus) Vujić & Radenković, 2008
    - P. (Pandasyopthalmus) Stuckenberg, 1954
    - P. (Paragus) Latreille, 1804
    - P. (Serratoparagus) Vujić & Radenković, 2008
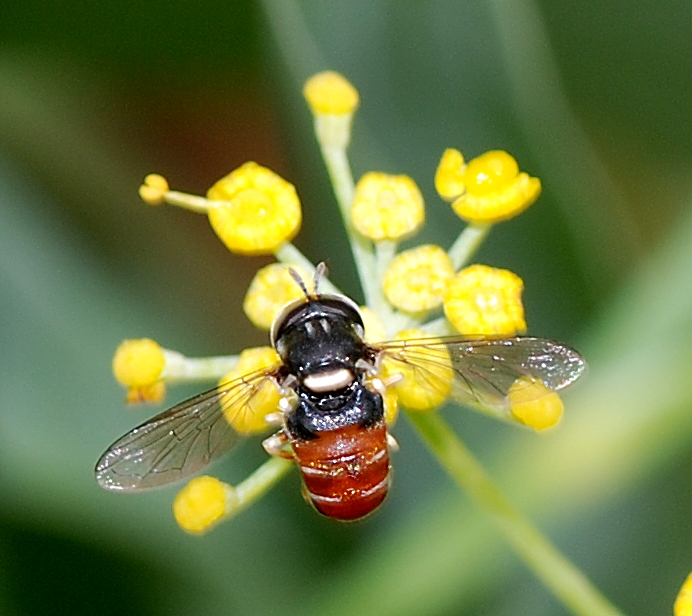
Paragus

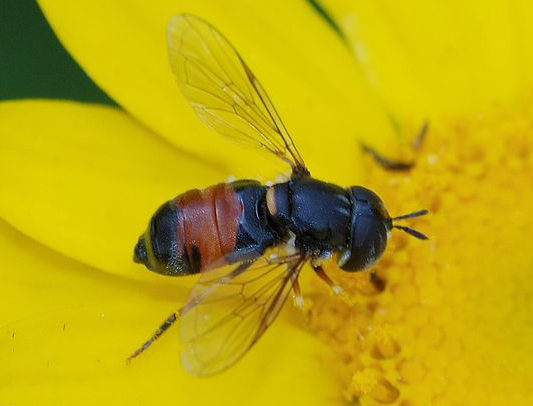
P. (Paragus)

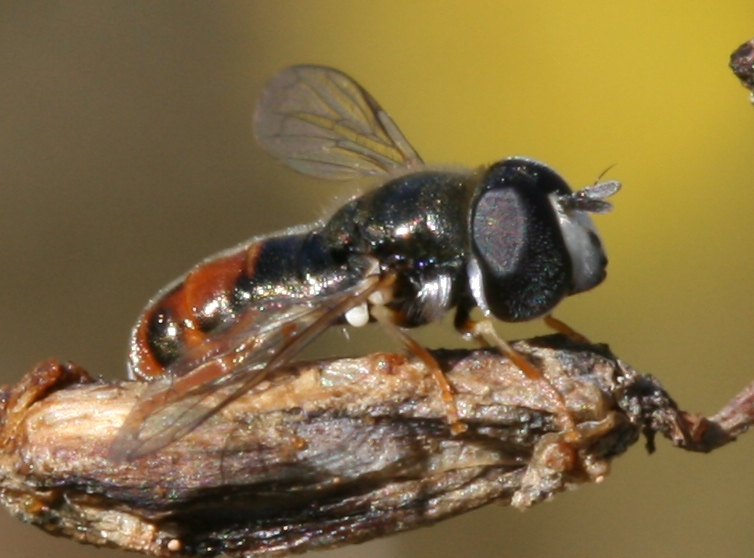
P. (Pandasyopthalmus)

=== Tribe: Syrphini ===
(=Chrysotoxini). In Mengual et al. (2008) this tribe was resolved into two groups.

==== Syrphini (Group 1) ====
- Afrosyrphus Curran, 1927: AF
- Betasyrphus Matsumura, 1917: AF AU OR PA
- Chrysotoxum Meigen, 1803 (=Mulio): AF NE NT OR PA
- Dasysyrphus Enderlein, 1938: NE NT OR PA
- Didea Macquart, 1834: NE OR PA
- Dideoides Brunetti, 1908 (=Malayomyia): OR PA
- Dideopsis Matsumura, 1917: AU OR PA
- Epistrophe Walker, 1852 (=Eristalosyrphus): AU NE OR PA
- Epistrophella (Dusek & Laska 1967)
- Eriozona Schiner, 1860: NE OR PA
- Eupeodes : cosmopolitan
  - Subgenera:
    - E. (Eupeodes) Osten Sacken, 1877
    - E. (Macrosyrphus) Matsumura, 1917
    - E. (Metasyrphus) Matsumura, 1917
- Fagisyrphus Dusek & Laska, 1967
- Flavizona Huo, 2010
- Ischiodon Sack, 1913: AF AU OR PA
- Lapposyrphus Dusek & Laska, 1967
- Leucozona : NE OR PA
  - Subgenera:
    - L. (Ischyrosyrphus) Bigot, 1882
    - L. (Leucozona) Schiner, 1860
- Megasyrphus Dusek & Laska 1967
- Melangyna (=Mesosyrphus, Stenosyrphus) : AU NE OR PA
  - Subgenera:
    - M. (Austrosyrphus) Vockeroth, 1969
    - M. (Melangyna) Verrall, 1901
    - M. (Melanosyrphus) Vockeroth, 1969
- Meligramma Frey, 1946
- Notosyrphus Vockeroth, 1969 : NT
- Parasyrphus Matsumura, 1917: NE OR PA
- Philhelius Stephens, 1841 (=Xanthogramma): NE OR PA
- Pseudodoros : AF NE NT PA
  - Subgenera:
    - P. (Dioprosopa) Hull, 1949
    - P. (Pseudodoros) Matsumura, 1903
- Scaeva (=Catabomba): NE NT OR PA
  - Subgenera:
    - S. (Scaeva) Fabricius, 1805
    - S. (Semiscaeva) Kuznetsov, 1985
- Simosyrphus Bigot, 1882: AU
- Syrphus Fabricius, 1775 : AF NE NT OR PA
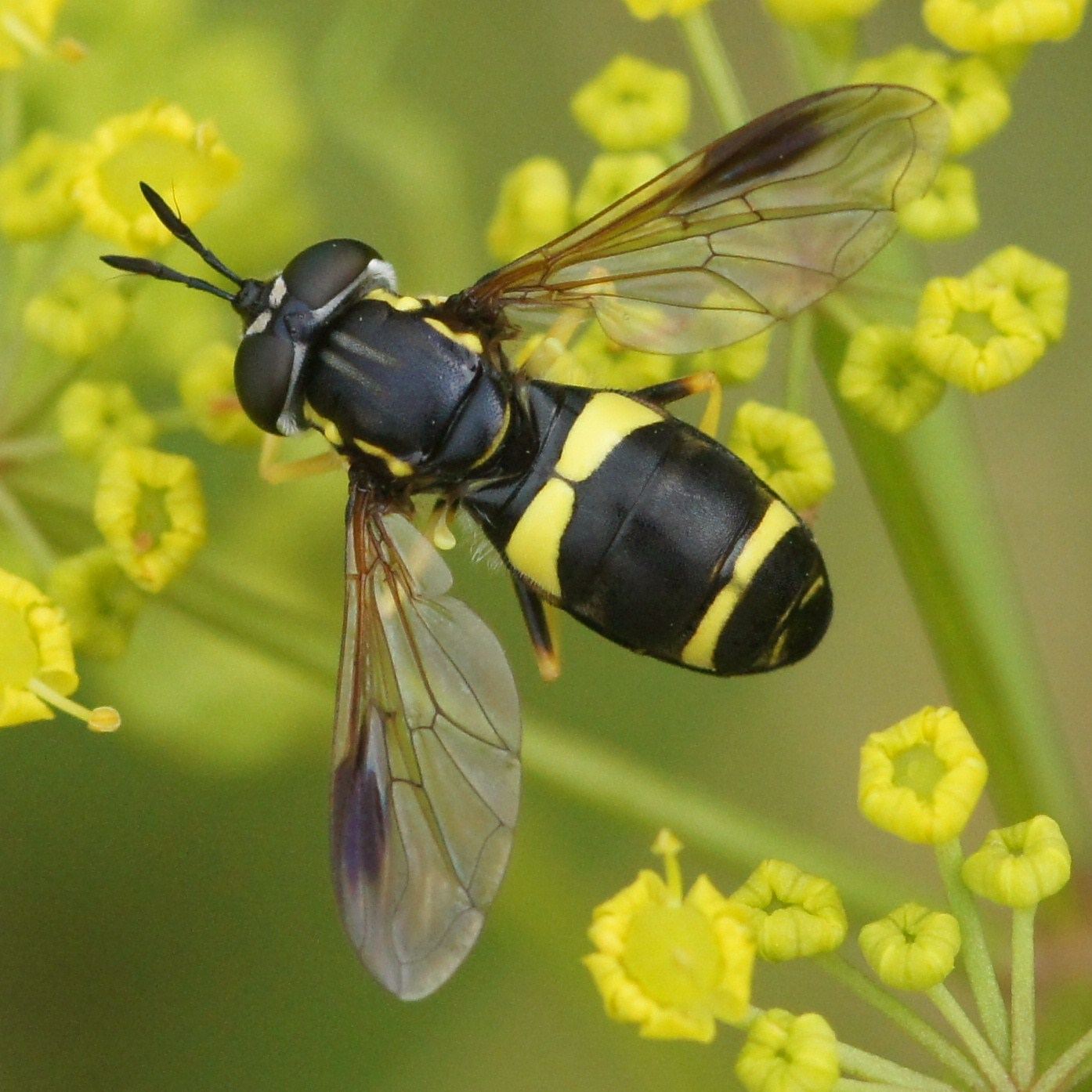
Chrysotoxum

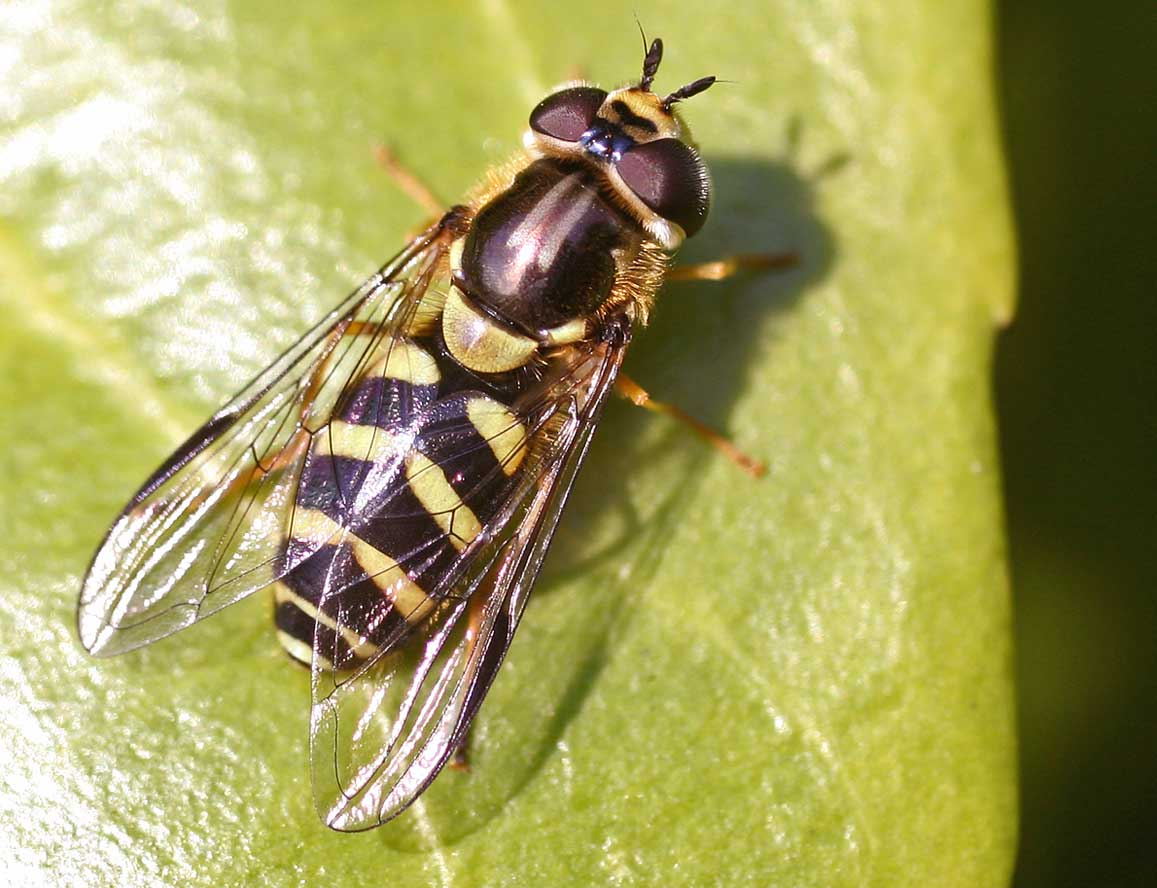
Dasysyrphus

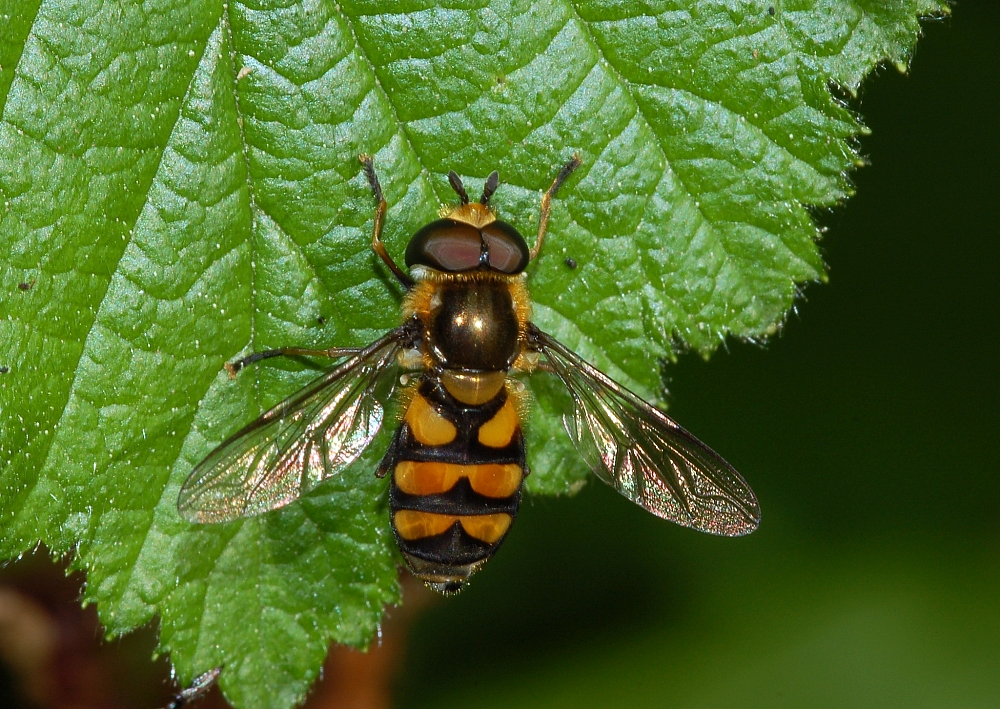
Didea

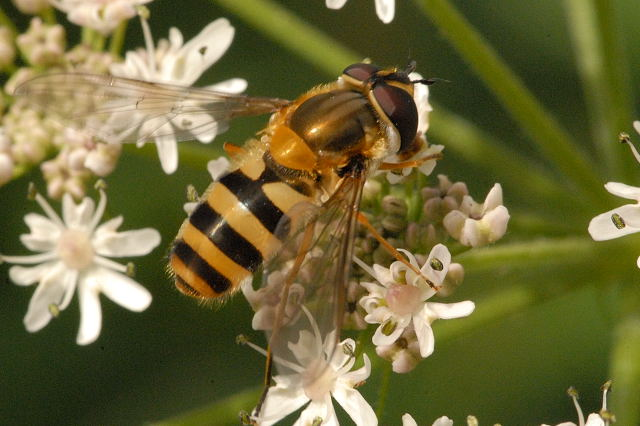
Epistrophe

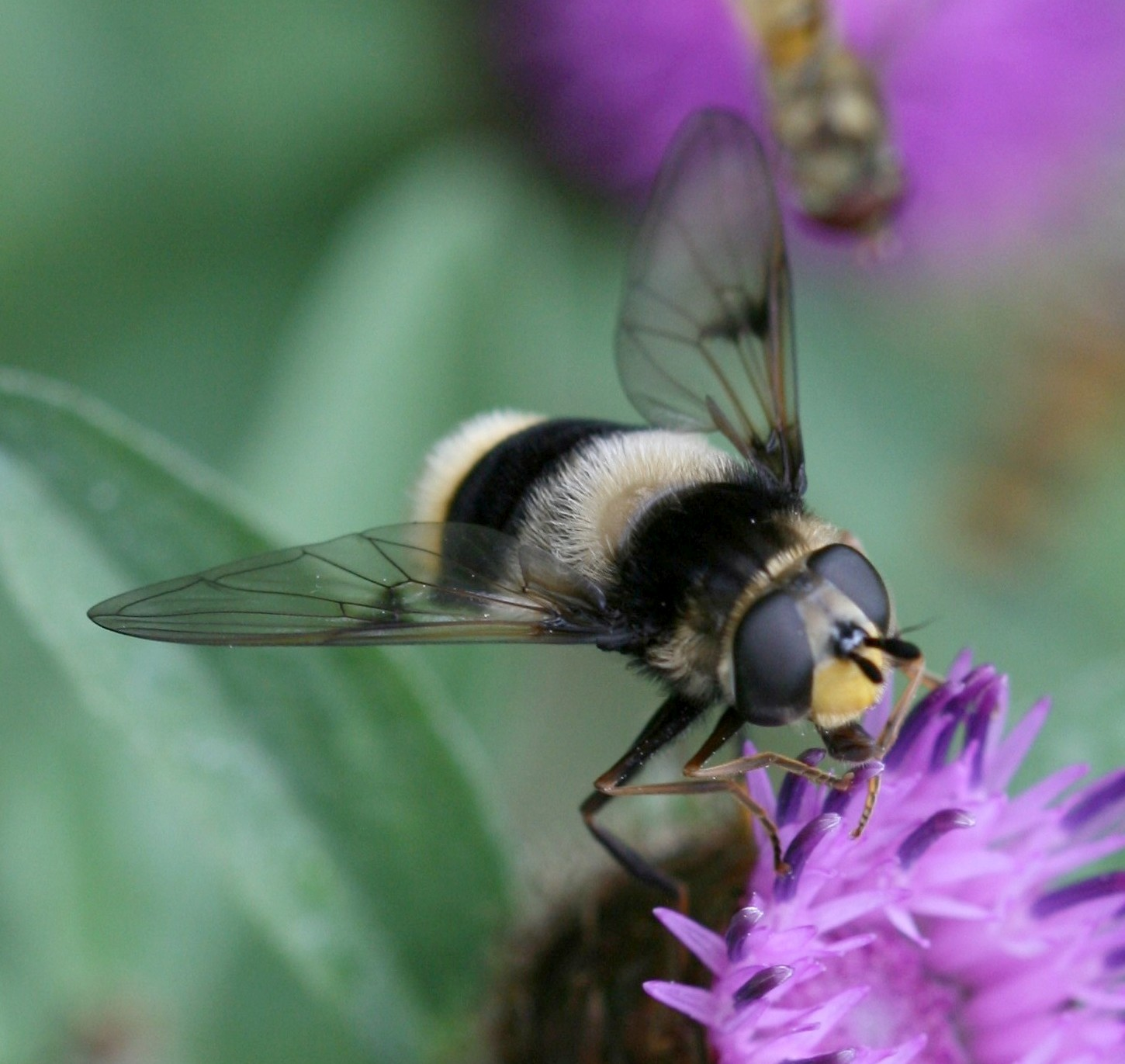
Eriozona

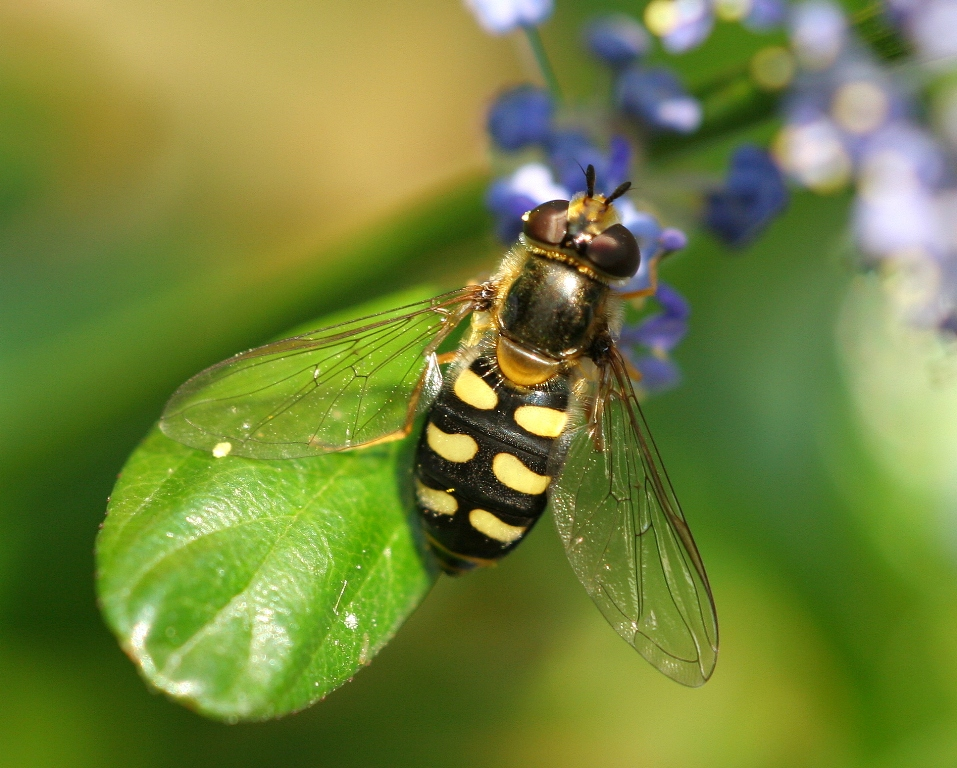
Eupeodes

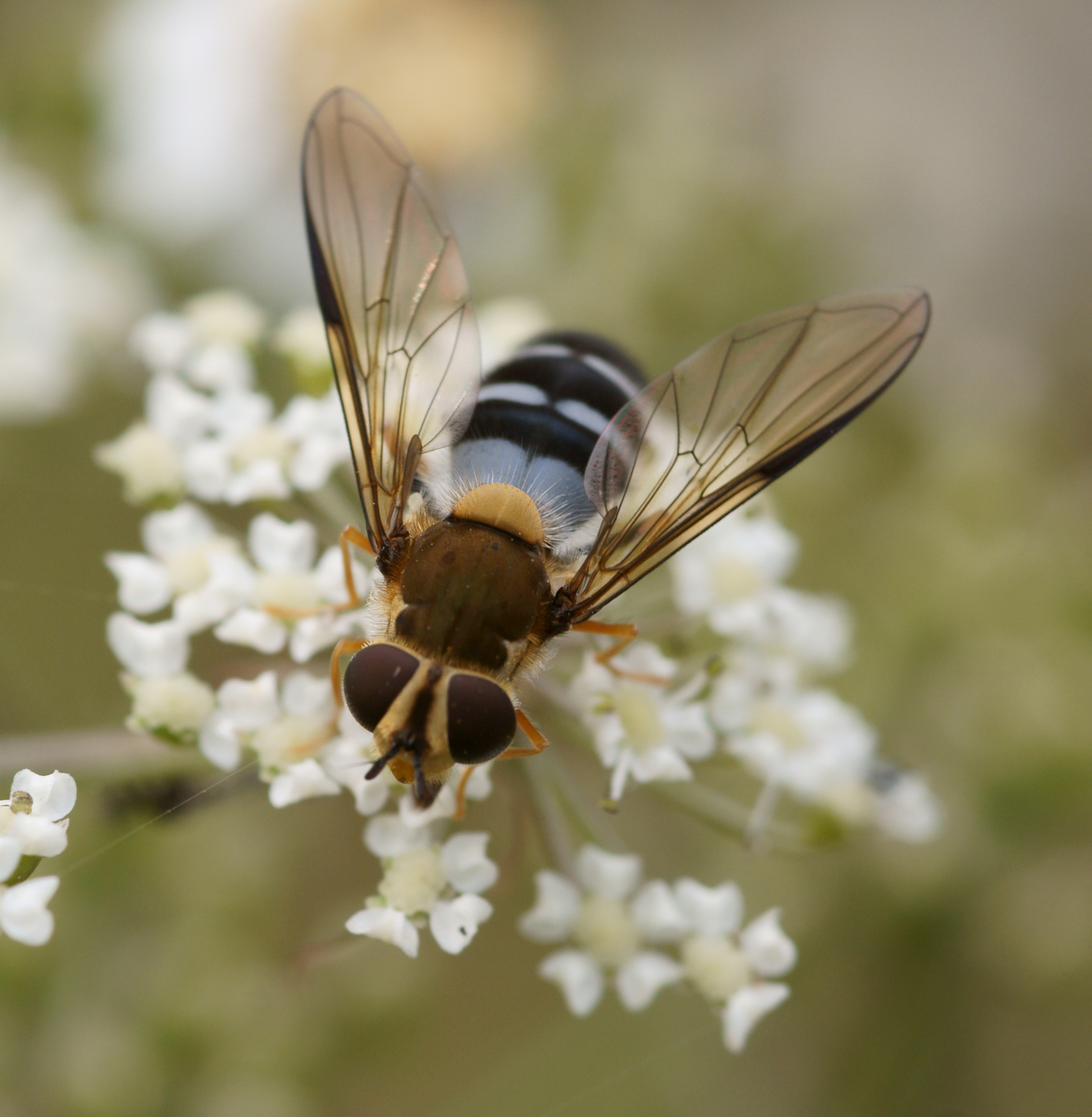
Leucozona

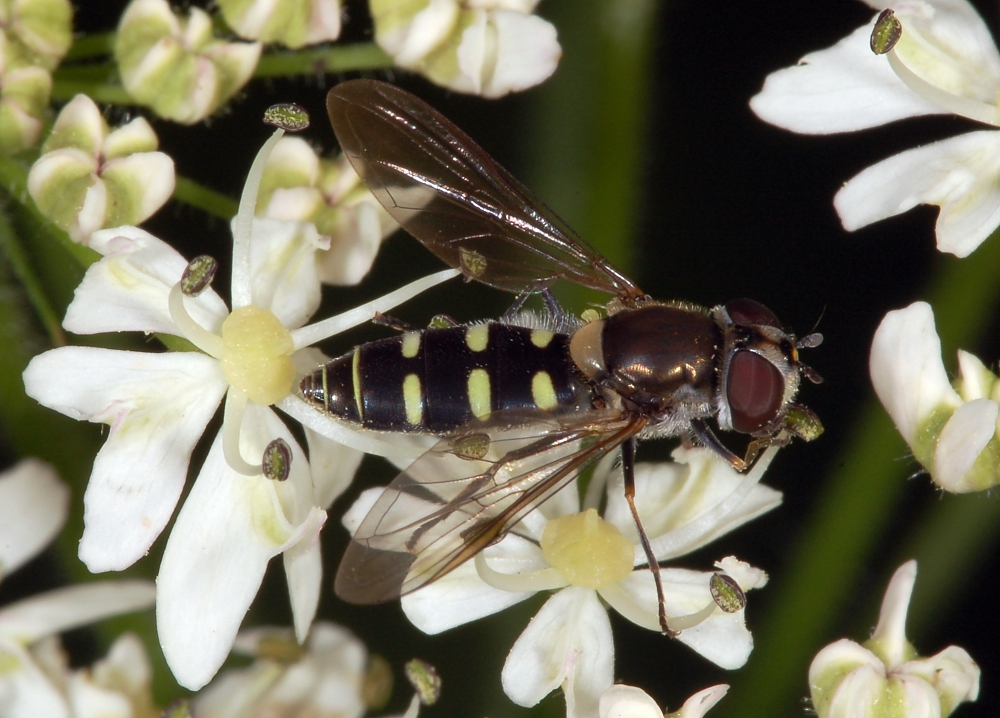
Melangyna

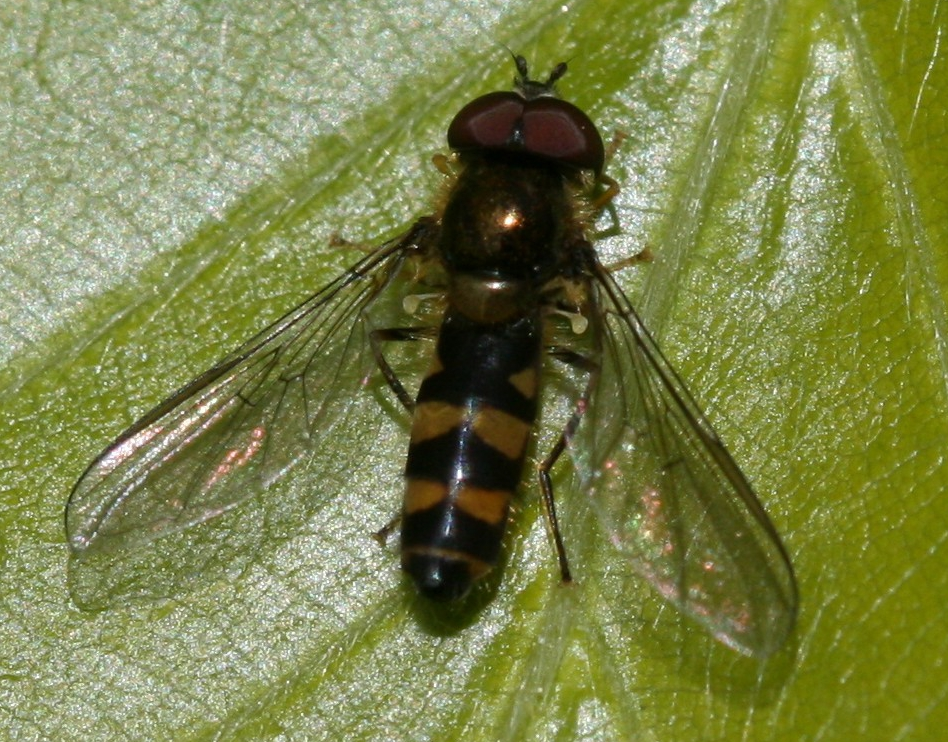
Meligramma

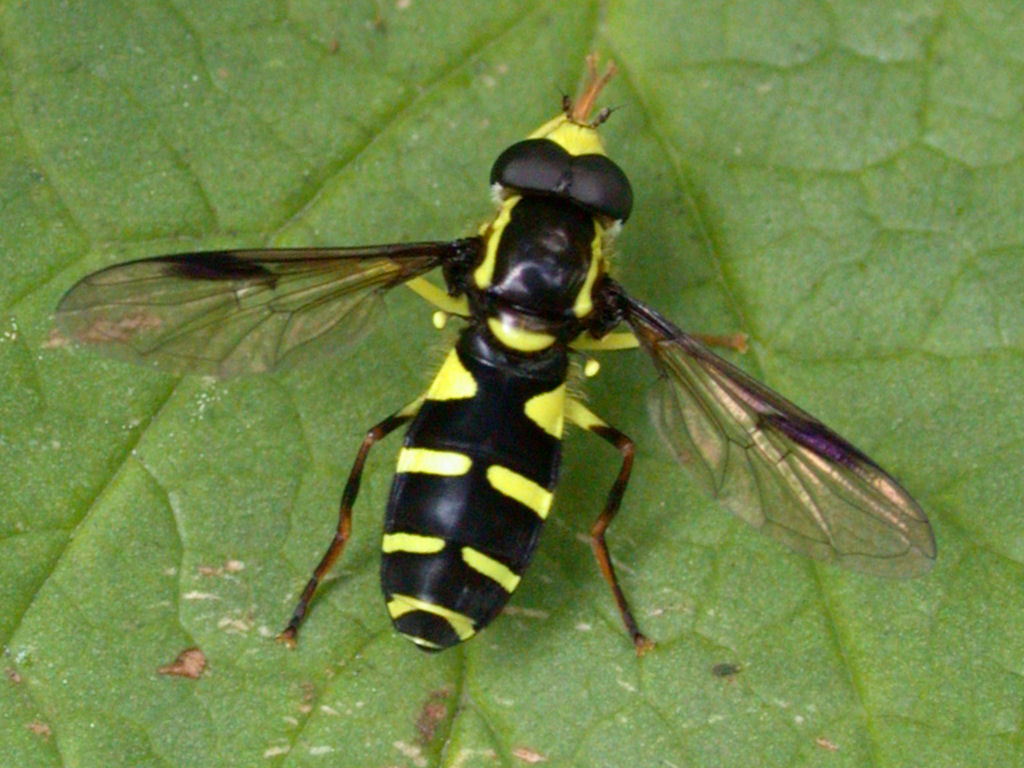
Philhelius

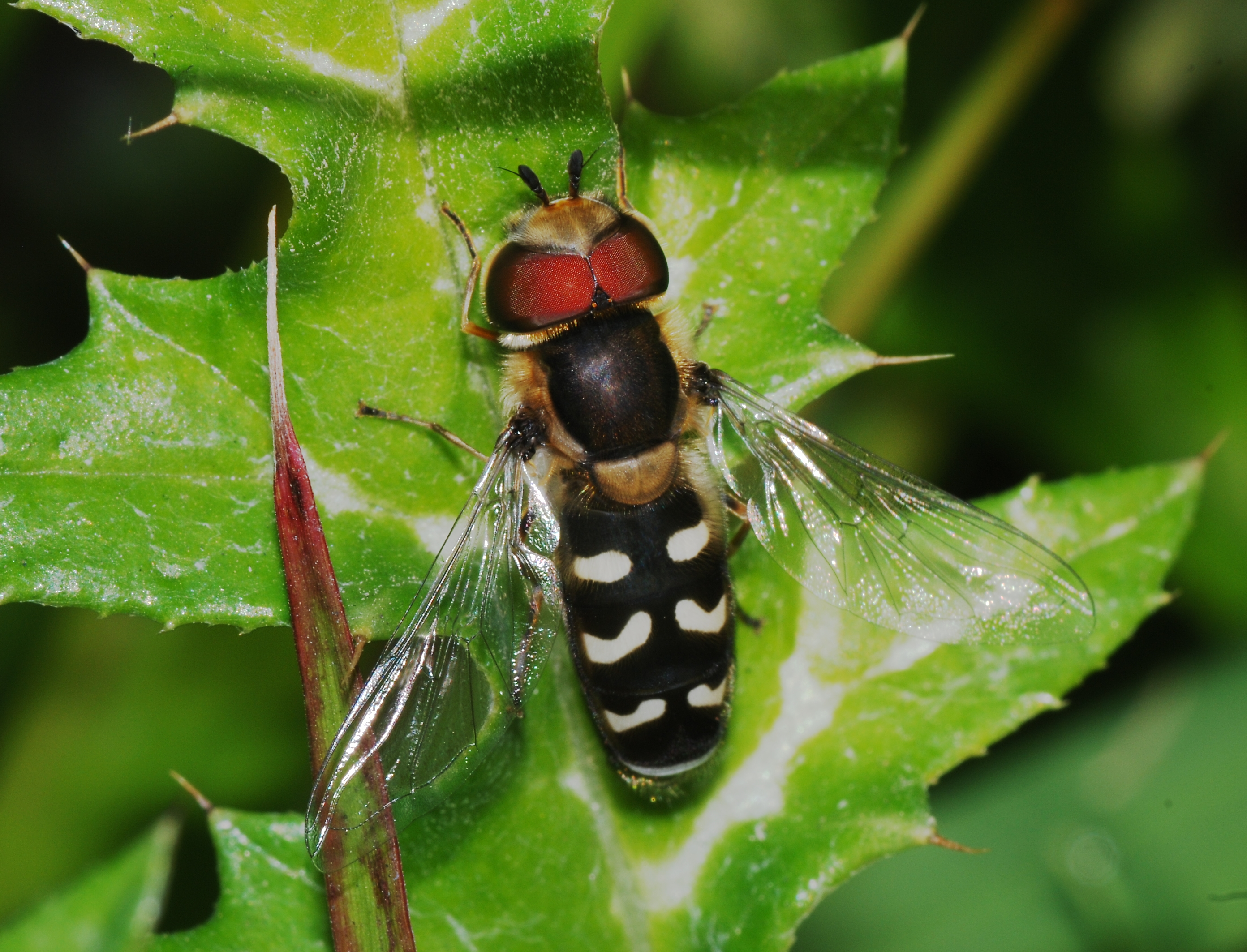
Scaeva

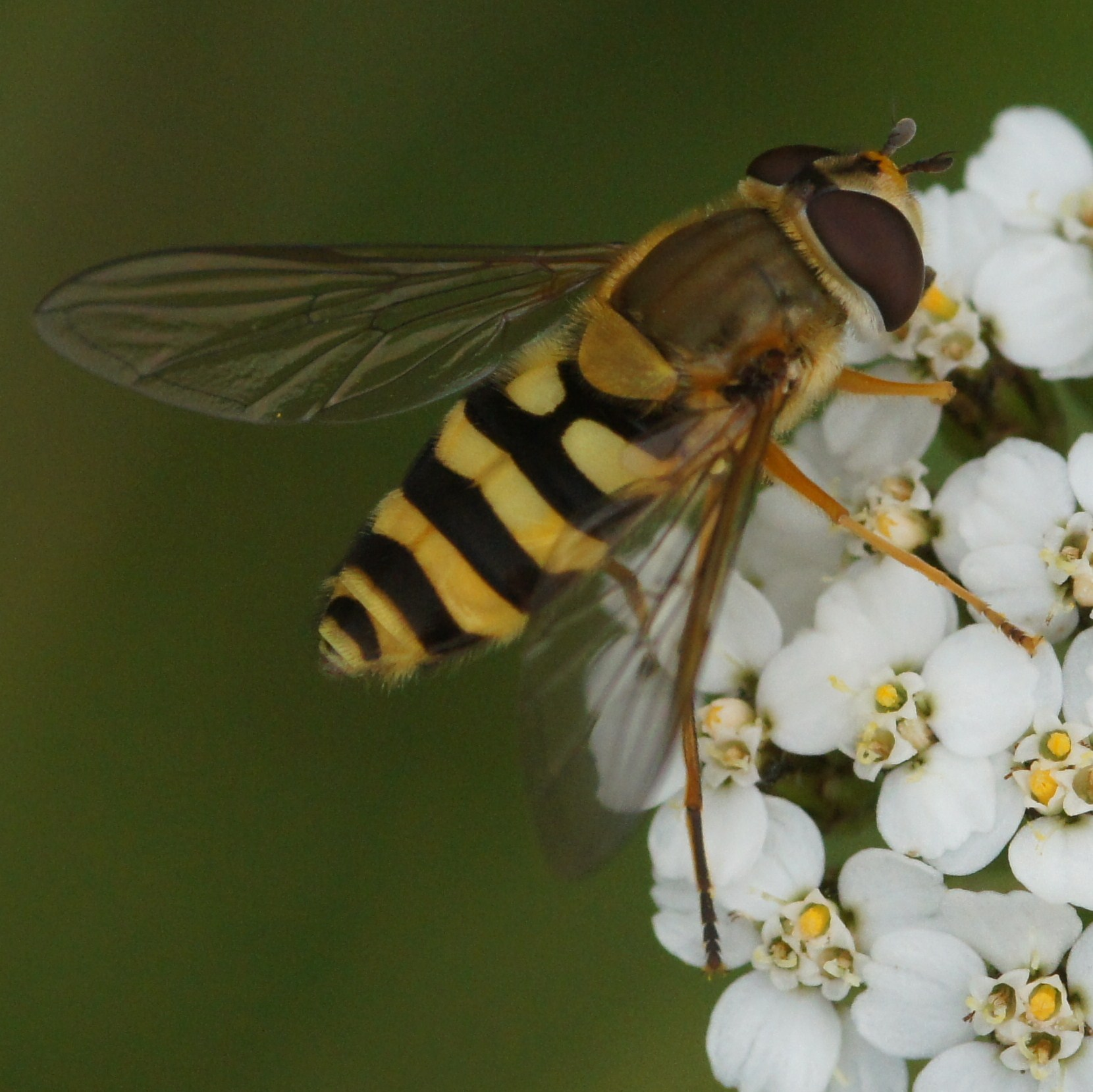
Syrphus

==== Syrphini (Group 2) ====
- Anu Thompson, 2008
- Allobacha Curran, 1928 (=Ptileuria): AF AU OR PA
- Allograpta (=Miogramma, Oligorhina): cosmopolitan
  - Subgenera:
    - A. (Allograpta) Osten Sacken, 1875
    - A. (Antillus) Vockeroth, 1969
    - A. (Claraplumula) Shannon, 1927
    - A. (Costarica) Mengual & Thompson, 2009
    - A. (Rhinoprosopa) Hull, 1942
- Anu Thompson, 2008: AU
- Asarkina : AF AU OR PA
  - Subgenera:
    - A. (Achoanus) Munro, 1924
    - A. (Asarkina) Macquart, 1834
- Citrogramma Vockeroth, 1969: AU OR
- Eosalpingogaster Hull, 1949b
- Eosphaerophoria Frey, 1946 (=Tambavanna): AU OR
- Episyrphus : AF AU OR PA
  - Subgenera:
    - E. (Asiobaccha) Violovitch, 1976
    - E. (Episyrphus) Matsumura & Adachi, 1917
- Fazia Shannon, 1927
- Giluwea Vockeroth, 1969: AU
- Meliscaeva Frey, 1946 : NE OR PA
- Ocyptamus : NE NT
  - Subgenera:
    - O. (Atylobaccha) Hull, 1949
    - O. (Aulacibaccha) Hull, 1949
    - O. (Calostigma) Shannon, 1927
    - O. (Hermesomyia) Vockeroth, 1969
    - O. (Hybobathus) Enderlein, 1937
    - O. (Mimocalla) Hull, 1943
    - O. (Ocyptamus) Macquart, 1834
    - O. (Orphnabaccha) Hull, 1949
    - O. (Pelecinobaccha) Shannon, 1927
    - O. (Pipunculosyrphus) Hull, 1937
    - O. (Pseudoscaeva) Vockeroth, 1969
    - O. (Styxia) Hull, 1943
    - O. (Therantha) Hull, 1943
- Salpingogaster Schiner, 1868: NE NT
- Sphaerophoria : AF AU NE OR PA
  - Subgenera:
    - S. (Exallandra) Vockeroth, 1969: AF
    - S. (Loveridgeana) van Doesburg & van Doesburg, 1976
    - S. (Sphaerophoria) Lepeletier & Serville, 1828
- Victoriana Miranda, 2020: AU
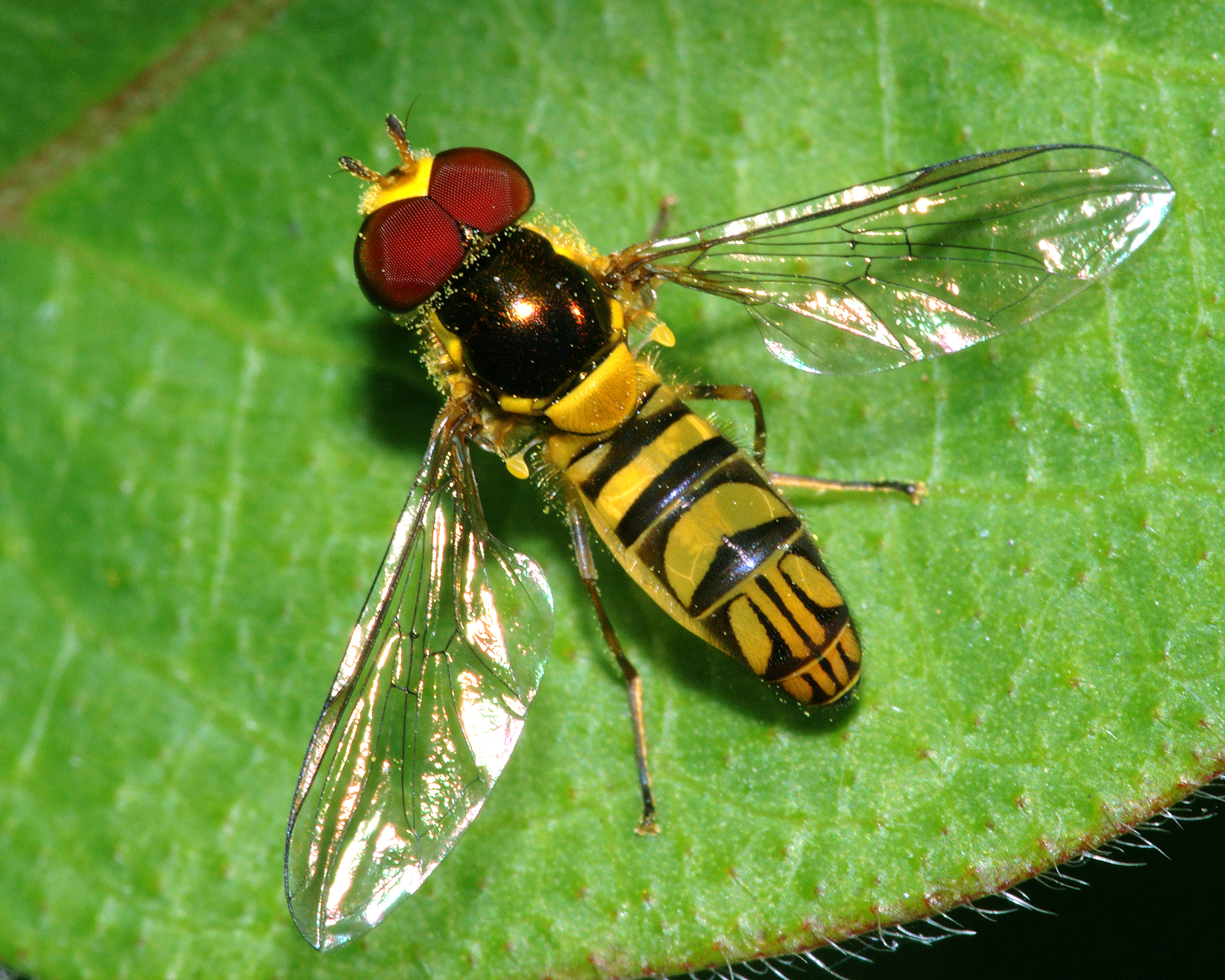
Allograpta

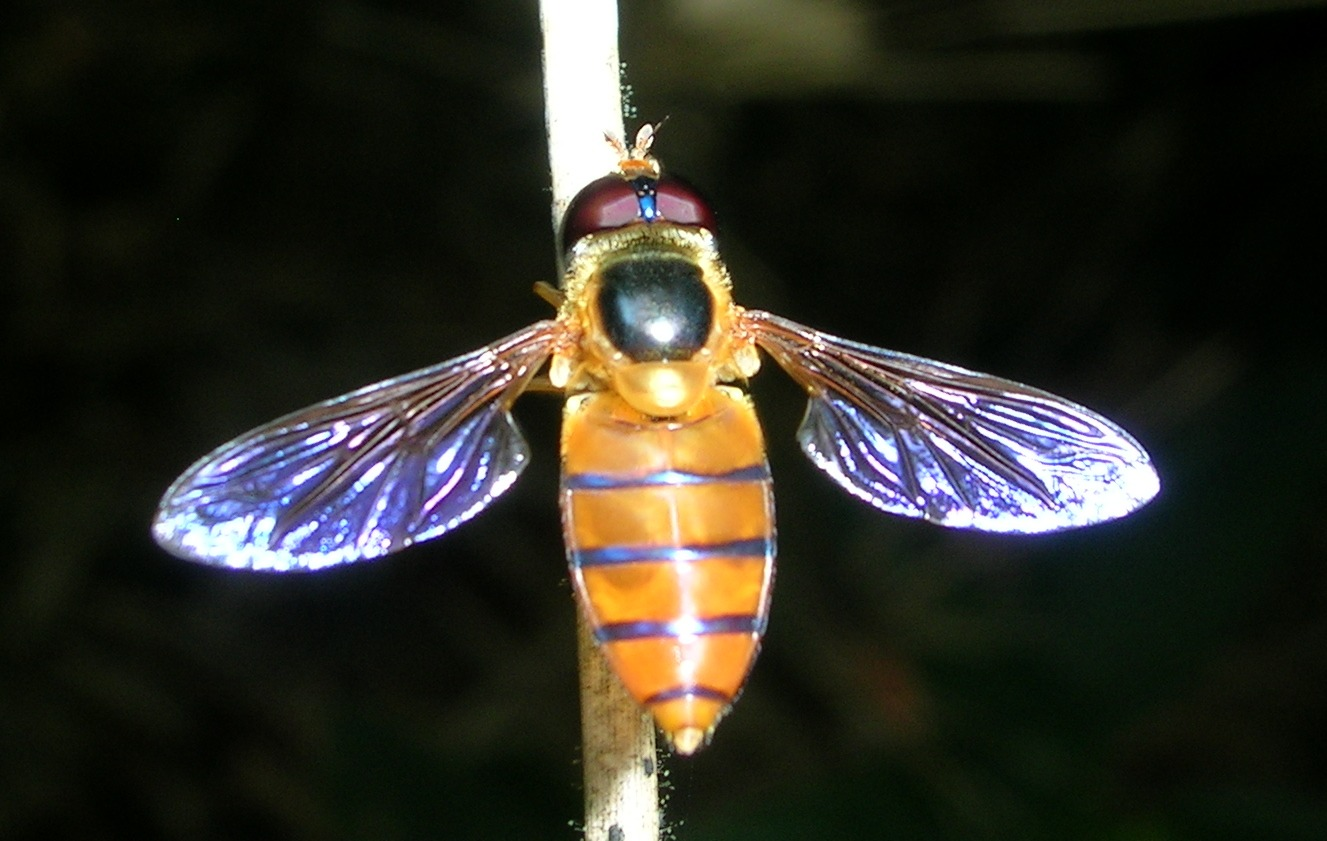
Asarkina

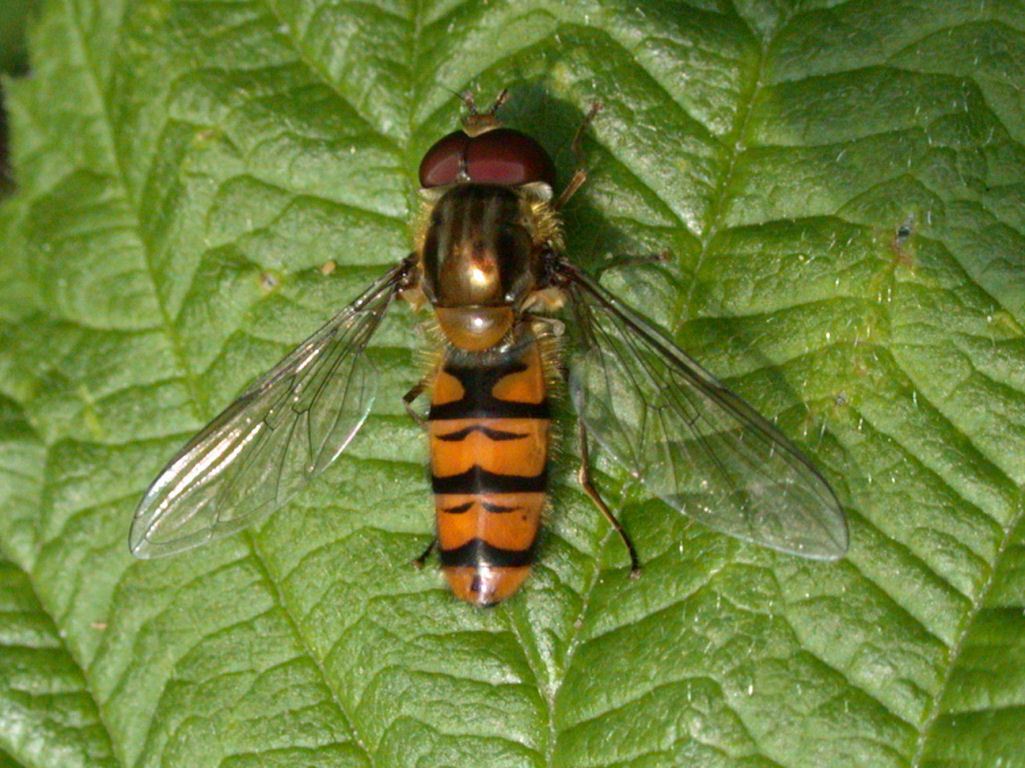
Episyrphus

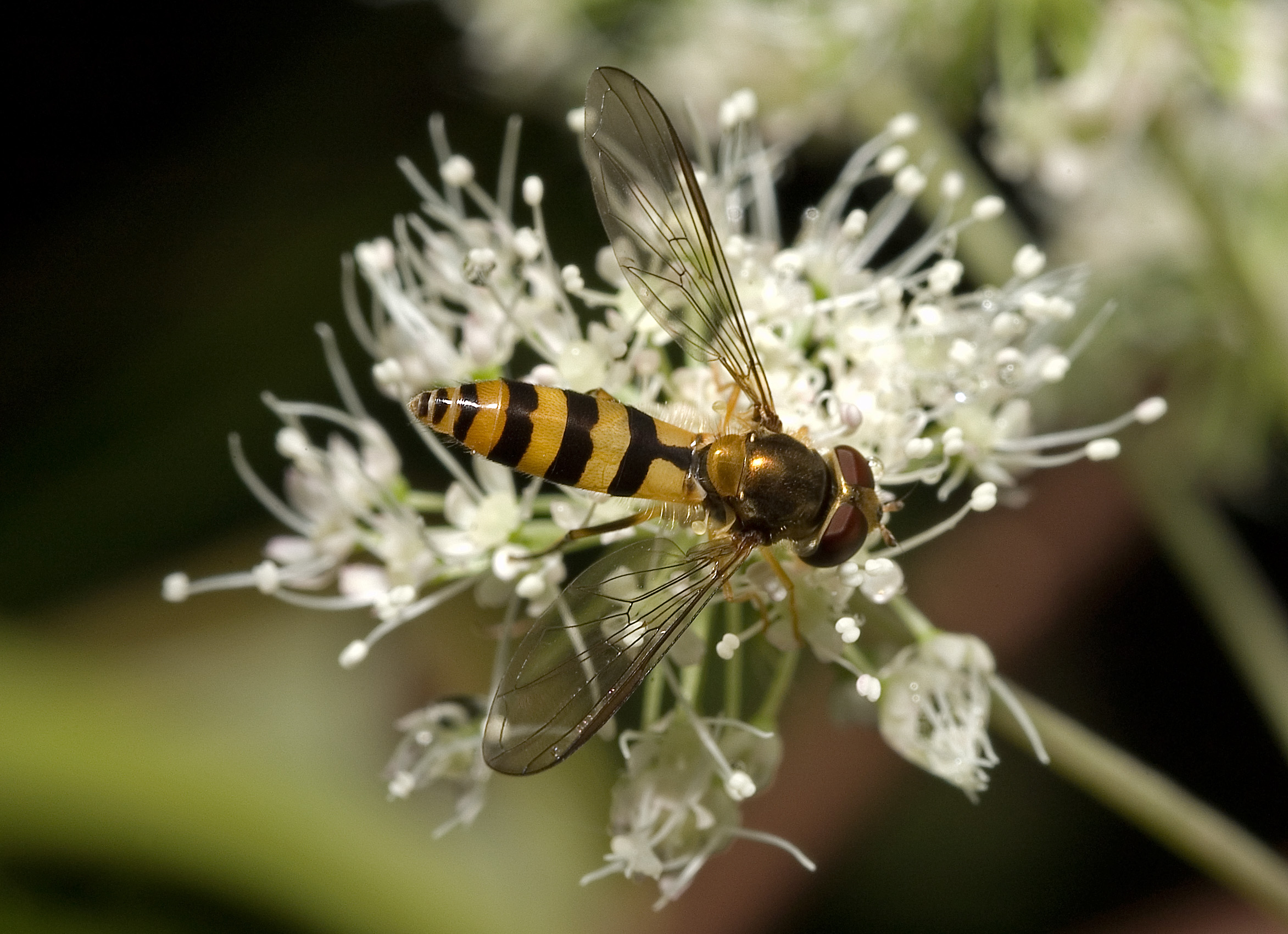
Meliscaeva

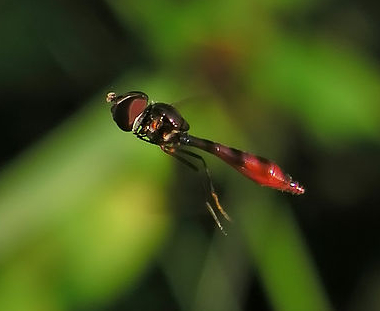
Ocyptamus

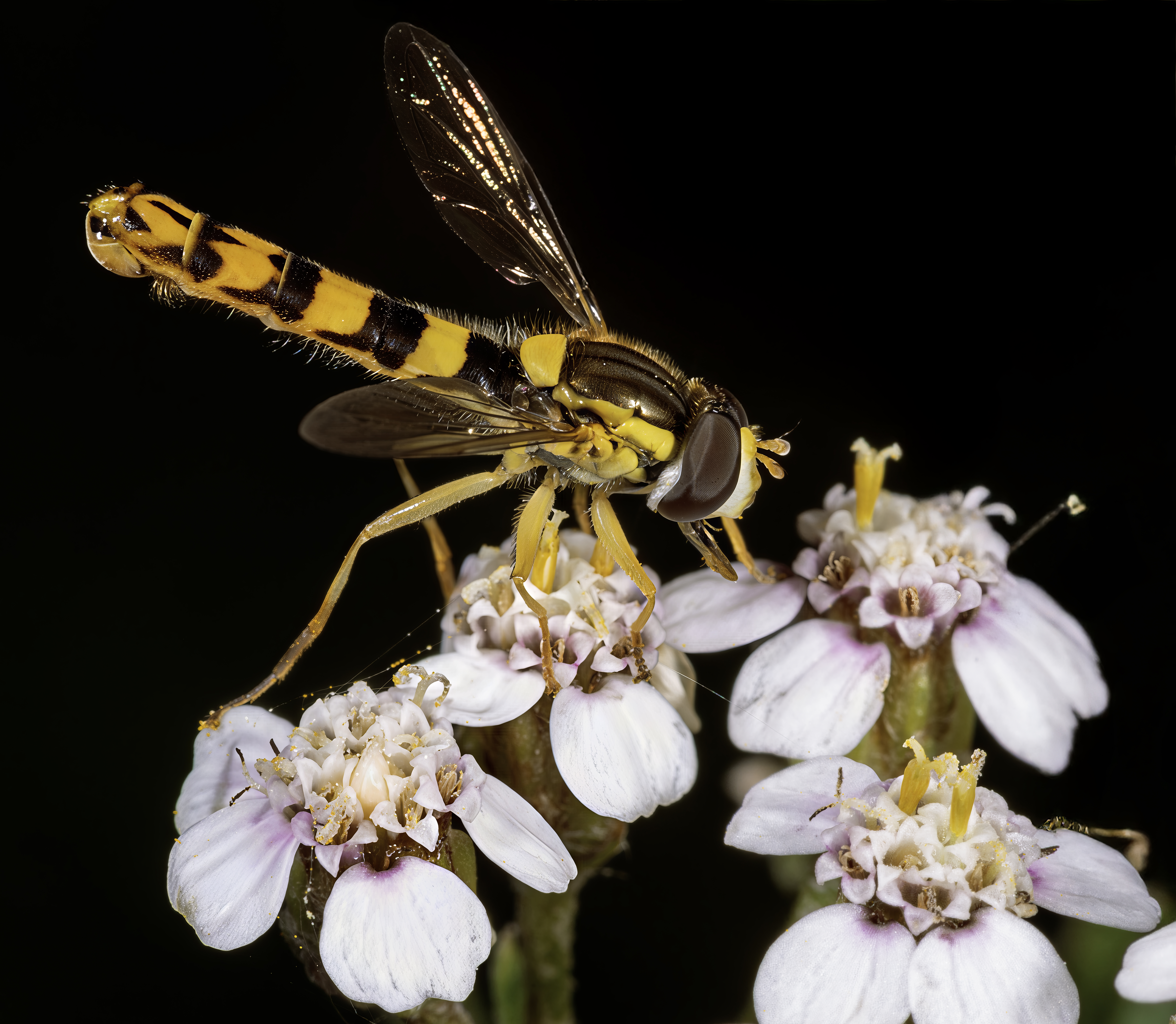
Sphaerophoria

==== Syrphini (Group undetermined) ====
- Agnisyrphus Ghorpade, 1994: OR
- Asiodidea Stackelberg, 1930: PA
- Dideomima Vockeroth, 1969: NE NT
- Doros Meigen, 1803: NE PA
- Lamellidorsum Huo & Zheng, 2005: PA
- Pelloloma Vockeroth, 1973: AF
- Rhinobaccha Meijere, 1908: OR
- Vockerothiella Ghorpade, 1994 : OR

=== Tribe: Toxomerini ===
- Toxomerus Macquart, 1855 (=Antiops, Mesogramma, Mesograpta, Mitrosphen): AU NE NT
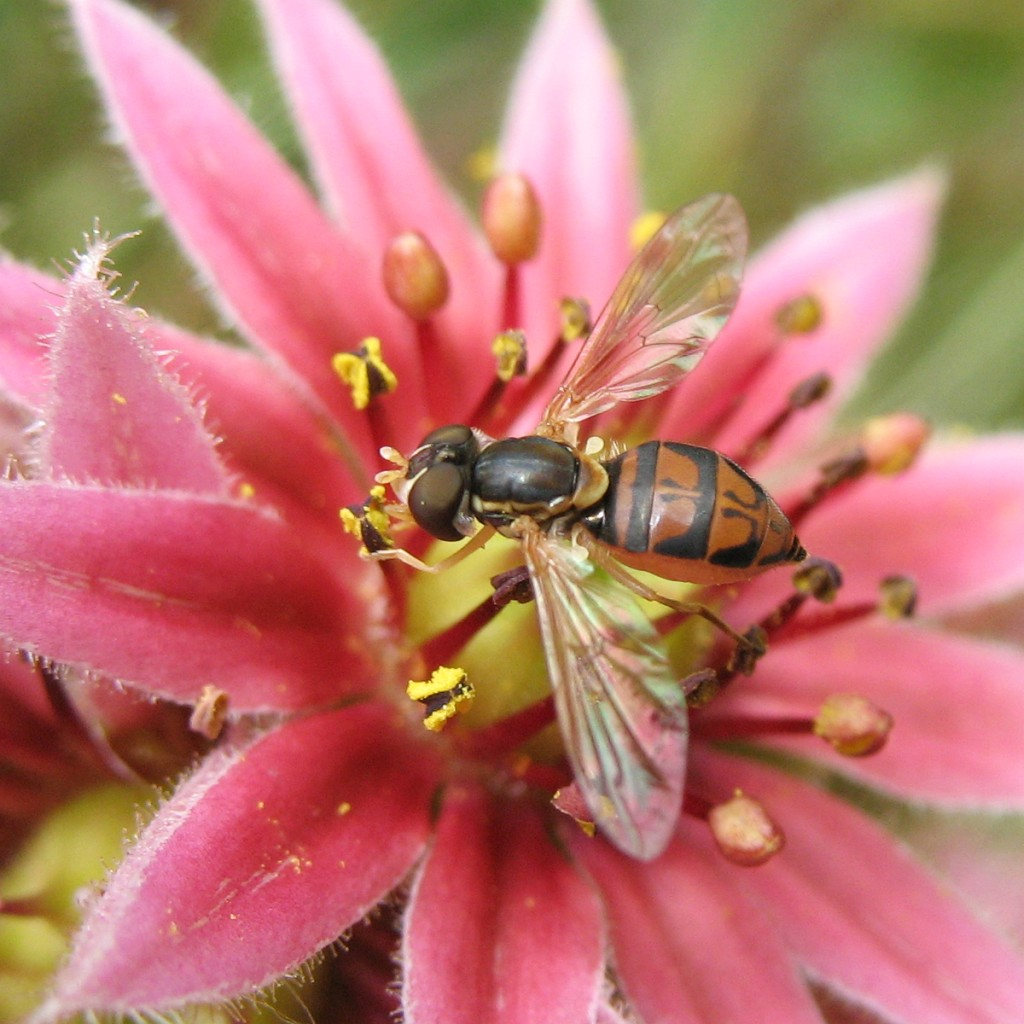
Toxomerus

== Genera of uncertain affinities ==
This section contains a list of genera for which the bibliography does not provide a clear systematic position. These genera are not intended as incertae sedis: It is likely that they have been given a formal taxonomic description or been defined in a subsequent revision, but not in the works consulted.

- Pia Philippi, 1865: NT
- Poliomyia Scudder, 1878: NE
- Spheginascia Meunier, 1901: PA

== See also ==
- Hoverfly genera
- Lists of insect genera
- Syrphidae of New York State
- List of flower fly species of North America

== Notes ==
=== Bibliography ===
- BioSystematic Database of World Diptera
- Libor Mazánek. Syrphidae Latreille, 1802. In L. Jedlička, V. Stloukalová, M. Kúdela (editor), Checklist of Diptera of the Czech Republic and Slovakia. Electronic version 1 + CD-ROM, 2006. ISBN 80-969629-0-6.
- Katzourakis, A.; A. Purvis; S. Azmeh; G. Rotheray; F. Gilbert (2001). "Macroevolution of hoverflies (Diptera: Syrphidae): the effect of using higher-level taxa in studies of biodiversity, and correlates of species richness". Journal of Evolutionary Biology. 14 (2): 219–227. doi:10.1046/j.1420-9101.2001.00278.x.
- Mengual, X.; Gunilla Ståhls; Santos Rojo (2008). "First phylogeny of predatory flower flies (Diptera, Syrphidae, Syrphinae) using mitochondrial COI and nuclear 28S rRNA genes: conflict and congruence with the current tribal classification" (PDF). Cladistics. 24 (4): 543–562. doi:10.1111/j.1096-0031.2008.00200.x. hdl:10045/12249. PMID 34879632. S2CID 85348839. Archived from the original (PDF) on 2009-04-09.
- Mengual, X.; Carlos Ruiz; Santos Rojo; Gunilla Ståls; Frederic Christian Thompson (2009). "A conspectus of the flower fly genus Allograpta (Diptera: Syrphidae) with description of a new subgenus and species" (PDF). Zootaxa. 2214: 1–28. doi:10.11646/zootaxa.2214.1.1. ISSN 1175-5326.
- Sabrosky, C. W. Family-Group Names in Diptera. An annotated catalog. In F. Christian Thompson (editor), MYIA The International Journal of the North America Dipertists' Society. Volume 10. Leiden, Backhuys Publishers, 1999.
- Thompson, F. C., & Rotheray, G. Family Syrphidae. In: László Papp, Béla Darvas (editor) Manual of Palaearctic Diptera. Volume 3: Higher Brachycera. Budapest, Science Herald, 1998: 81-139 . ISBN 963-04-8838-8
- Shannon, R. C. (1926). "Review of the American xylotine syrphid-flies". Proceedings of the United States National Museum. 69 (9): 1–52. doi:10.5479/si.00963801.2635. hdl:10088/15651.
- Stubbs, Alan E.; Falk, Steven J (1983). British Hoverflies: An Illustrated Identification Guide (2nd ed.). London: British Entomological and Natural History Society. pp. 253, xvpp. ISBN 978-1-899935-03-1.
- Thompson, F. C.; Vockeroth, J. R.; Sedman, Y. S. (1976). A Catalogue of the Americas South of the United States: Family Syrphidae. São Paulo, Brasil: Museu de Zoologia.
- Thompson, F. C. (1972). "A contribution to a generic revision of the Neotropical Milesiinae (Diptera: Syrphidae)" (PDF). Arquivos de Zoologia. 23: 73–215. Archived from the original (PDF) on 2011-07-06.
- Thompson, F. C. (1975). "Notes on the status and relationships of some genera in the tribe Milesiini (Diptera: Syrphidae)" (PDF). Proceedings of the Entomological Society of Washington. 77 (3): 291–305.
- Thompson, F. C. (2000). "A new genus of Australasian Flower Flies (Diptera: Syrphidae" (PDF). Studia Dipterologica. 7 (Heft 2): 373–384. ISSN 0945-3954.
- Thompson, F. C. (2003). "Austalis, a new genus of flower flies (Diptera: Syrphidae) with revisionary notes on related genera" (PDF). Zootaxa. 246: 1–19. doi:10.11646/zootaxa.246.1.1. ISSN 1175-5326. Archived from the original (PDF) on 2010-01-23.
- Thompson, F. C. (2008). "A conspectus of New Zealand flower flies (Diptera: Syrphidae) with the description of a new genus and species" (PDF). Zootaxa. 1716: 1–20. doi:10.11646/zootaxa.1716.1.1. ISSN 1175-5326. Archived from the original (PDF) on 2011-08-14.
- Thompson, F. C.; Vockeroth, John Richard (17 April 2016). "51. Family SYRPHIDAE". In Neal L. Evenhuis (ed.). Catalog of the Diptera of the Australasian and Oceanian Regions (online version ed.). Bishop Museum.
- Van Veen, M.P. (2004). Hoverflies of Northwest Europe, Identification Keys to the Syrphidae (Hardback). Utrecht: KNNV Publishing. p. 254. ISBN 978-90-5011-199-7.
- Vockeroth, J. R. & Thompson, F. C. Syrphidae. In: Jeffrey F. McAlpine (editor) Manual of Nearctic Diptera, Volume 2. Research Branch, Agriculture Canada, Monograph 28, 1987: 713-743. ISBN 0-660-12125-5.
- Xin-Yue Cheng; Frederic Christian Thompson (2008). "A generic conspectus of the Microdontinae (Diptera: Syrphidae) with the description of two new genera from Africa and China" (PDF). Zootaxa. 1879: 21–48. doi:10.11646/zootaxa.1879.1.3. ISSN 1175-5326.
