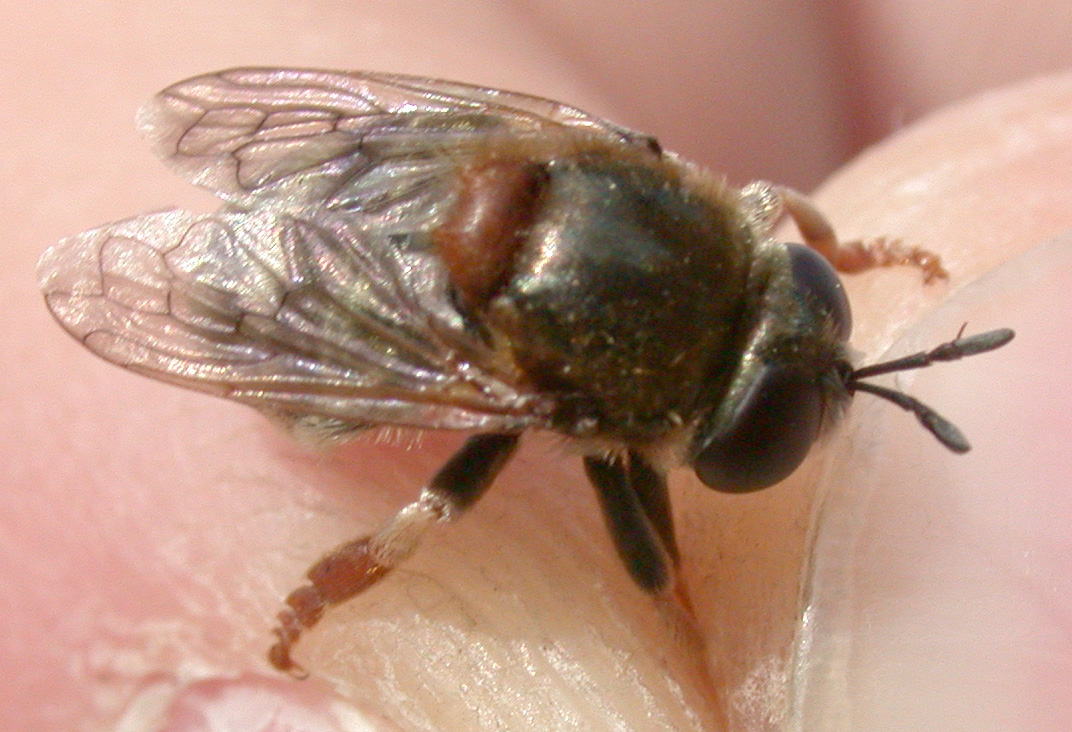
- Microdon mutabilis

Scientific classification
- Kingdom: Animalia
- Phylum: Arthropoda
- Clade: Pancrustacea
- Class: Insecta
- Order: Diptera
- Family: Syrphidae
- Subfamily: Microdontinae
- Genus: Microdon; Meigen, 1803

Type species
- Musca mutabilis Linnaeus, 1758

Subgenera and species groups
- Chymophila Macquart, 1834; Dimeraspis Newman, 1838; Megodon Keiser, 1971; Microdon sensu stricto; Myiacerapis Hull, 1949; Syrphipogon Hull, 1937; Microdon sensu lato; craigheadii-group; erythros-group; mirabilis-group; tarsalis-group; virgo-group; unplaced species

Synonyms
- Aphritis Latreille, 1804; Colacis Gistel, 1848; Scutelligera Spix, 1824; Parmula Heyden, 1825; Scutigerella Haas, 1924

= Microdon (fly) =

Genus of flies

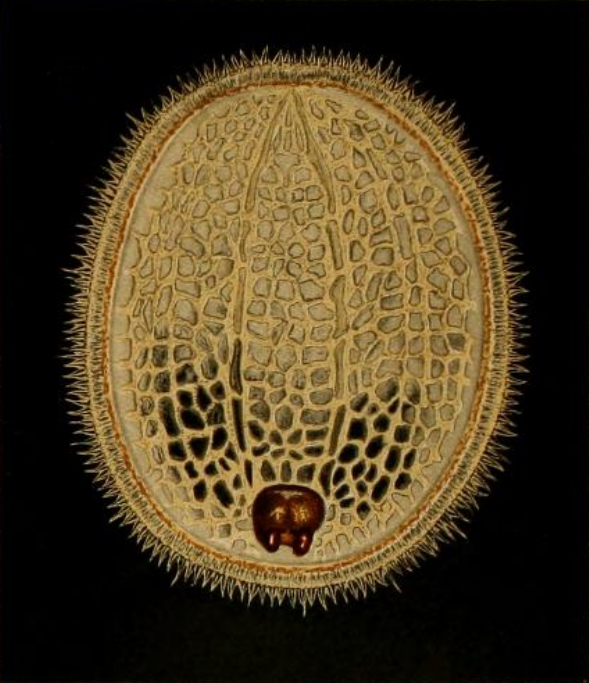
Microdon eggeri, larva, third instar

Hover flies (family Syrphidae) of the genus Microdon are unusual among the Diptera. Like other members of the subfamily, they are myrmecophiles, meaning they inhabit the nests of ants.

There are 249 species known worldwide, with the greatest diversity being from the tropics; 30 species are known from North America, though it is expected that many of these species will be placed in other genera in time, as Microdon has been used as a catch-all for various unrelated species not placed in other genera.

== Appearance ==
Microdon adults look more or less like typical flies. Like some other hoverflies, they are generally robust and very hairy, often closely resembling bees. They are between 8 and 15 mm long. The antennae are rather long, with the last (third) segment nearly as long as, or sometimes significantly longer than, the first segment; the antennae are nearly as long as the fly's face. These flies are covered in black or pale (white or golden) hairs, and are themselves either black or metallic green or blue. The scutellum is with apical calcars and wing vein R4+5 with an appendix. They have simple legs and abdomens.

The real oddity of the genus Microdon is in its larvae and pupae. These are dome-shaped and look like stout little slugs. Their appearance originally led scientists to describe them as mollusks and scale insects. They are slow-moving. Most have the spiracles on a peg-like protuberance extending from the end of their abdomens.

== Behaviour ==
Adult Microdon flies do not behave like other syrphid flies; they do not hover around flowers, but instead remain very near the ant colonies which serve as larval hosts.

Larvae may be found very deep in ant colonies. Some species actively feed on ant larvae in the colony, others are speculated to be scavengers. Microdon larvae are more or less restricted in their ant host species. Some Microdon species have only ever been found in the colonies of a single ant species, while others are restricted to related ant species or genera. Because these flies have such cryptic life cycles, biological information on most species is limited.

== Species ==
Microdon is divided into six subgenera (including Microdon sensu stricto), plus five species groups and some unplaced species in Microdon sensu lato.

=== Subgenus Chymophila ===
Nearctic:

- Microdon fulgens Wiedemann, 1830 (Synonyms: Microdon euglossoides Gray, 1832; Chymophila splendens Macquart, 1834)

Neotropical:

- Microdon angulatus Hull, 1943
- Microdon argentinae Hull, 1937
- Microdon aurifacius Hull, 1937
- Microdon barbiellinii Curran, 1936
- Microdon bruchi Shannon, 1927
- Microdon cyaneiventris Macquart, 1846 (Synonym: Aphritis cyanoventris Williston, 1886 (misspelling))
- Microdon cyaneus Perty, 1833
- Microdon emeralda Hull, 1943
- Microdon flavoluna Hull, 1943
- Microdon histrio Wiedemann, 1830
- Microdon inaequalis Loew, 1866
- Microdon instabilis Wiedemann, 1830 (Synonyms: Aphritis dives Rondani, 1848; Microdon aurifex Wiedemann, 1830; Microdon trochilus Walker, 1852)
- Microdon limbatus Wiedemann, 1830
- Microdon marceli Curran, 1936
- Microdon nero Curran, 1936
- Microdon nestor Curran, 1940
- Microdon opulentus Bigot, 1883
- Microdon pulcher Williston, 1887
- Microdon shannoni Curran, 1940
- Microdon splendens Wiedemann, 1830
- Microdon stramineus Hull, 1943
- Microdon superbus Wiedemann, 1830
- Microdon tigrinus Curran, 1940
- Microdon willistoni Mik, 1899 (Synonym: Microdon inermis Williston, 1888 (nec Loew, 1858))

Oriental:

- Microdon aenoviridis Curran, 1931
- Microdon baramus Curran, 1942
- Microdon beatus Curran, 1942
- Microdon latiscutellaris Curran, 1931
- Microdon lativentris Meijere, 1921 (Synonym: Microdon grandis Curran, 1928)
- Microdon lundura Curran, 1942
- Microdon stilboides Walker, 1849

Palaearctic:

- Microdon katsurai Maruyama & Hironaga, 2004

=== Subgenus Dimeraspis ===
- Microdon abditus Thompson, 1981
- Microdon adventitius Thompson, 1981
- Microdon fuscipennis (Macquart, 1834)
- Microdon globosus (Fabricius, 1805)
- Microdon marmoratum Bigot, 1884
- Microdon remotus Knab, 1917

=== Subgenus Megodon ===
- M. planitarsus Keiser, 1971
- M. stuckenbergi (Keiser, 1971)

=== Subgenus Microdon sensu stricto ===
Nearctic:

- Microdon abstrusus Thompson, 1981
- Microdon albicomatus Novak, 1977
- Microdon aurulentus (Fabricius, 1805)
- Microdon cothurnatus Bigot, 1883
- Microdon lanceolatus Adams, 1903
- Microdon manitobensis Curran, 1924
- Microdon megalogaster Snow, 1892
- Microdon newcomeri Mann, 1924
- Microdon ocellaris Curran, 1924
- Microdon piperi Knab, 1917
- Microdon ruficrus Williston, 1887
- Microdon tristis Loew, 1864
- Microdon xanthopilis Townsend, 1895

Neotropical:

- Microdon aureopilis Marinoni, 2004
- Microdon barbouri Hull, 1942
- Microdon bassleri Curran, 1940
- Microdon bonariensis Lynch Arribalzaga, 1891
- Microdon brutus Hull, 1944
- Microdon caesar Curran, 1940
- Microdon colakriki Reemer, 2014
- Microdon crassitarsis (Macquart, 1848)
- Microdon eutristis Curran, 1925
- Microdon macquartii Lynch Arribalzaga, 1891
- Microdon mourei Marinoni, 2004
- Microdon remus Curran, 1941
- Microdon rufiventris (Rondani, 1848)
- Microdon violaceus (Macquart, 1842)
- Microdon virgo Curran, 1940

Oriental:

- Microdon aeneus Keiser, 1952
- Microdon alboscutatus Curran, 1931
- Microdon bellus Brunetti, 1923
- Microdon formosanus Shiraki, 1930
- Microdon fulvopubescens Brunetti, 1923
- Microdon fumipennis Hull, 1944
- Microdon metallicus Meijere, 1904
- Microdon sumatranus Wulp, 1892
- Microdon sumbanus Keiser, 1952

Palaearctic:

- Microdon analis (Macquart, 1842)
- Microdon auricomus Coquillett, 1898
- Microdon dentigiganteus Tian, Huo & Zhang, 2019
- Microdon devius (Linnaeus, 1761)
- Microdon hauseri Reemer, 2013
- Microdon ignotus Violovitsh, 1976
- Microdon japonicus Yano, 1915
- Microdon kidai Hironaga & Maruyama, 2004
- Microdon lateus Violovitsh, 1976
- Microdon lehri Mutin, 1999
- Microdon macrocerus Hironaga & Maruyama, 2004
- Microdon major Andries, 1912
- Microdon mandarinus Reemer, 2013
- Microdon maritimus Violovitsh, 1976
- Microdon miki Doczkal & Schmid, 1999
- Microdon murayamai Hironaga & Maruyama, 2004
- Microdon mutabilis (Linnaeus, 1758)
- Microdon myrmicae Schönrogge, Barr, Wardlaw, Napper, Gardner, Breen, Elmes & Thomas, 2002
- Microdon mysa Violovitsh, 1971
- Microdon nigripes Shiraki, 1930
- Microdon nigrodorsatus Mutin, 2011
- Microdon novus (Schrank, 1776)
- Microdon oitanus Shiraki, 1930
- Microdon podomelainus Huo, Ren & Zheng, 2007
- Microdon ursitarsis Stackelberg, 1926
- Microdon yokohamai Hironaga & Maruyama, 2004
- Microdon yunnanensis Reemer, 2013

=== Subgenus Myiacerapis ===
Myiacerapis is a subgenus of the hoverfly genus Microdon. It contains only one species, Microdon villosus. It is native to Uganda, though an undescribed species is known from South Africa. Larvae are found in ant nests.

=== Subgenus Syrphipogon ===
There are two species described in Syrphipogon:

- M. fucatissimus (Hull, 1937)
- M. gaigei Steyskal, 1953

=== Microdon sensu lato species groups ===
==== craigheadii-group ====
Nearctic:

- Microdon craigheadii Walton, 1912

==== erythros-group ====
Afrotropical:

- Microdon erythros Bezzi, 1908

= Microdon erytherus Bezzi, 1921 (misspelling)

- Microdon luteiventris Bezzi, 1915

==== mirabilis-group ====
Neotropical:

- Microdon bertonii Bezzi, 1910

= Microdon arcuata Curran, 1941

- Microdon iheringi Bezzi, 1910
- Microdon mirabilis Williston, 1888

==== tarsalis-group ====
Afrotropical:

- Microdon tarsalis Hervé-Bazin, 1913

= Microdon bequaerti Curran, 1929

==== Unplaced species ====
Afrotropical

- Microdon harinhalai (Reemer, 2015)
- Microdon berobak (Reemer, 2015)
- Microdon ifanadiana (Reemer, 2015)
- Microdon irwini (Reemer, 2015)
- Microdon janne (Reemer, 2015)
- Microdon sava (Reemer, 2015)
- Microdon tsara Keiser, 1971

Australian / Oceanian:

- Microdon amabilis Ferguson, 1926
- Microdon macquariensis Ferguson, 1926
- Microdon nigromarginalis Curran & Bryan, 1926
- Microdon pictipennis (Macquart, 1850)

= Microdon pictulipennis Hull, 1944

- Microdon rieki Paramonov, 1957
- Microdon waterhousei Ferguson, 1926

Oriental:

- Microdon carbonarius Brunetti, 1923
- Microdon pagdeni Curran, 1942
- Microdon trimacula Curran, 1928
- Microdon unicolor Brunetti, 1915
