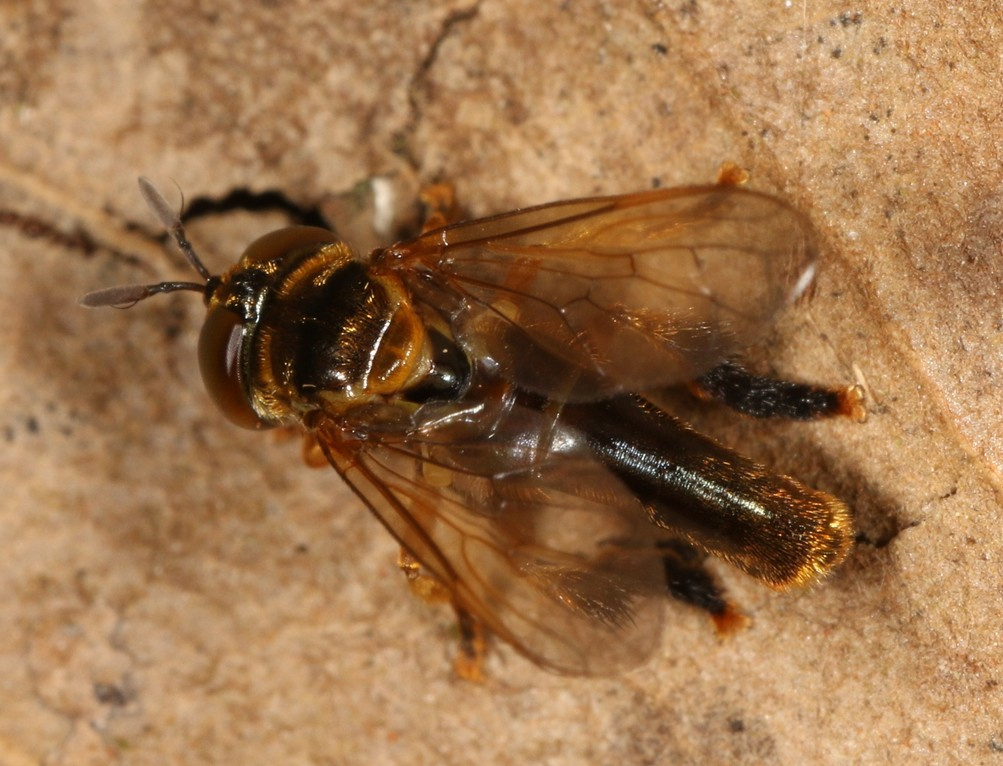
- Stipomorpha sp.

Scientific classification
- Kingdom: Animalia
- Phylum: Arthropoda
- Clade: Pancrustacea
- Class: Insecta
- Order: Diptera
- Family: Syrphidae
- Subfamily: Microdontinae
- Genus: Stipomorpha; Hull, 1945

Type species
- Microdon fraudator Shannon

= Stipomorpha =

Genus of hoverflies

Stipomorpha is a genus of hoverflies (Syrphidae). Restricted to the Neotropical region, with records ranging from Argentina to Costa Rica, the genus is one of several Microdontinae that mimic stingless bees, with a brush-like pilosity on the hind-tibia, superficially resembling the corbicula of Meliponini. They are distinguished from other stingless bee mimic syrphids by having unusually wide membranous parts between sternites 2 and 3.

== Morphology ==
With a body length of 6-11 mm, the genus can be differentiated from other Microdontinae stingless bee mimics by the presence of an unusually wide membranous parts between sternites 2 and 3 (sometimes hard to see in dry specimens) and an unfurcate aedeagus. Other diagnostic characteristics are the face, narrower than or as wide as one eye (apparently bare) in frontal view, except wider in S.wheeleri. The head also present a dorsally wide occiput and ventrally narrow. The scutellum is always semicircular, but never sulcate. The wings present an appendix from vein R4+5 (often absent in one or both wings), and the subcostal vein joins the costal vein at the same level as or proximal to the radial-medial crossvein. The abdomen, with an isosceles triangle format, presents a fusion between tergites 3 and 4, and sternite 1 is bare. The hypandrium is basally bulged in the genus.

== Mimicry and myrmecophily ==
Stipomorpha adults resemble Meliponini bees, such as Trigona and Tetragona species, while larvae are myrmecophiles, living in ant nests of different species, probably predating on ant brood. Only two associations of Stipomorpha species with a specific ant species are described, both with ants from the genus Crematogaster. The first one was made by Mann in 1928, associating Stipomorpha wheeleri (Mann, 1928) with a Crematogaster torosa Mayr, 1870 nest, while the second one was only made in 2013 by Reemer, associating the same species with a Crematogaster crinosa Mayr, 1862 nest. Reemer also described the species Stipomorpha crematogastri Reemer, 2013, but the adult holotype collected by Owain W. Richards, in 1968, and the empty puparium associated with it were accompanied only by a label containing "bred nest / Crematogaster", not specifying the species S. crematogastri was associated with.

== Taxonomic history ==
Originally, the first described Stipomorpha species were grouped in the genus Microdon Meigen, 1803. Only in 1945, Hull erected Stipomorpha as a subgenus of Microdon, based on the shape of the abdomen, especially for the first two segments being flared and wider than the thorax. A few years later, the same author included Stipomorpha as a subgenus of Paramixogasteroides Shiraki, 1930 (a junior synonym of the genus Paramixogaster Brunetti, 1923), with no morphological support for the change. Other authors have regarded Stipomorpha as a synonym of Ubristes Walker, 1852, sometimes placing it as a subgenus of Microdon, sometimes as its own genus. In 2013, Reemer and Ståhls erected the genus (status novus) once again, placing 16 species together and designating Microdon fraudator (Stipomorpha fraudator) as its type species. Months later, Reemer also described 9 new species, bringing the current total of 25 described species.

== Species ==
The following species are assigned to this genus:

- Stipomorpha apicula (Curran, 1930)
- Stipomorpha crematogastri Reemer, 2013
- Stipomorpha dichromata Reemer, 2013
- Stipomorpha elcopala Reemer, 2013
- Stipomorpha fallax Reemer, 2013
- Stipomorpha fraudator (Shannon, 1927)
- Stipomorpha goettei (Shannon, 1927)
- Stipomorpha guianica (Curran, 1925)
- Stipomorpha inarmata (Curran, 1925)
- Stipomorpha lacteipennis (Shannon, 1927)
- Stipomorpha lanei (Curran, 1936)
- Stipomorpha litoralis (Papavero, 1964)
- Stipomorpha mackiei (Curran, 1940)
- Stipomorpha maculipennis Reemer, 2013
- Stipomorpha mendax Reemer, 2013
- Stipomorpha micromidas (Shannon, 1925)
- Stipomorpha mixta (Curran, 1940)
- Stipomorpha panamana Reemer, 2013
- Stipomorpha puerilis (Doesburg, 1966)
- Stipomorpha simillima (Hull, 1950)
- Stipomorpha spuria Reemer, 2013
- Stipomorpha tenuicauda (Curran, 1925)
- Stipomorpha trigoniformis (Shannon, 1927)
- Stipomorpha wheeleri (Mann, 1928)
- Stipomorpha zophera Reemer, 2013
