= Chymophila =

Scientific classification
- Kingdom: Animalia
- Phylum: Arthropoda
- Clade: Pancrustacea
- Class: Insecta
- Order: Diptera
- Family: Syrphidae
- Subfamily: Microdontinae
- Genus: Microdon (fly)
- Subgenus: Chymophila; Macquart, 1834

Type species
- Chymophila splendens Macquart, 1834

Synonyms
- Chimophila Osten Sacken, 1875 (misspelling); Eumicrodon Curran, 1925

Subgenus of flies

Chymophila is a subgenus of the hoverfly genus Microdon. It was previously considered to be exclusively Neotropical, but is now also known from the Nearctic and Oriental realms, and one species is known from Japan. Chymophila was based on a composite type species: the holotype is a body of C. fulgens with the head of a conopid glued on.

== Species ==
There are 33 species described in Chymophila:

Nearctic:

- Microdon fulgens Wiedemann, 1830 (Synonyms: Microdon euglossoides Gray, 1832; Chymophila splendens Macquart, 1834)

Neotropical:

- Microdon angulatus Hull, 1943
- Microdon argentinae Hull, 1937
- Microdon aurifacius Hull, 1937
- Microdon barbiellinii Curran, 1936
- Microdon bruchi Shannon, 1927
- Microdon cyaneiventris Macquart, 1846 (Synonym: Aphritis cyanoventris Williston, 1886 (misspelling))
- Microdon cyaneus Perty, 1833
- Microdon emeralda Hull, 1943
- Microdon flavoluna Hull, 1943
- Microdon histrio Wiedemann, 1830
- Microdon inaequalis Loew, 1866
- Microdon instabilis Wiedemann, 1830 (Synonyms: Aphritis dives Rondani, 1848; Microdon aurifex Wiedemann, 1830; Microdon trochilus Walker, 1852)
- Microdon limbatus Wiedemann, 1830
- Microdon marceli Curran, 1936
- Microdon nero Curran, 1936
- Microdon nestor Curran, 1940
- Microdon opulentus Bigot, 1883
- Microdon pulcher Williston, 1887
- Microdon shannoni Curran, 1940
- Microdon splendens Wiedemann, 1830
- Microdon stramineus Hull, 1943
- Microdon superbus Wiedemann, 1830
- Microdon tigrinus Curran, 1940
- Microdon willistoni Mik, 1899 (Synonym: Microdon inermis Williston, 1888 (nec Loew, 1858))

Oriental:

- Microdon aenoviridis Curran, 1931
- Microdon baramus Curran, 1942
- Microdon beatus Curran, 1942
- Microdon latiscutellaris Curran, 1931
- Microdon lativentris Meijere, 1921 (Synonym: Microdon grandis Curran, 1928)
- Microdon lundura Curran, 1942
- Microdon stilboides Walker, 1849

Palaearctic:

- Microdon katsurai Maruyama & Hironaga, 2004
