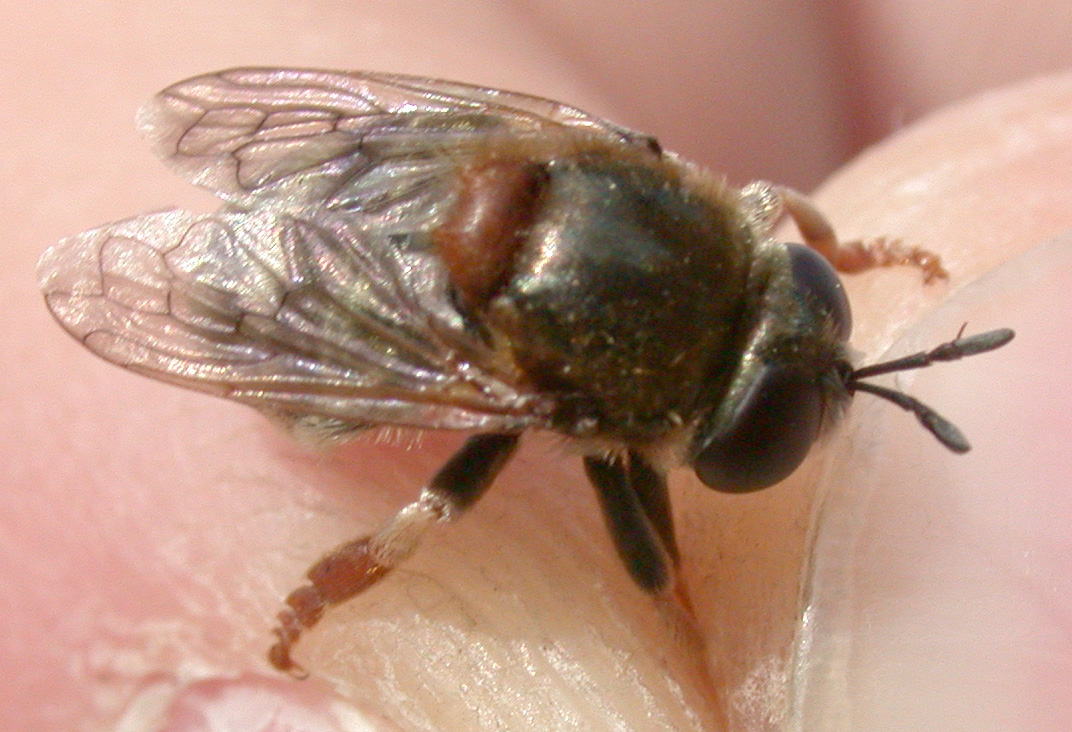

Scientific classification
- Kingdom: Animalia
- Phylum: Arthropoda
- Clade: Pancrustacea
- Class: Insecta
- Order: Diptera
- Family: Syrphidae
- Genus: Microdon
- Species: M. mutabilis

Binomial name
- Microdon mutabilis (Linnaeus, 1758)

Synonyms
- Microdon rhenanus Andries, 1912; Microdon scutellatus Schummel, 1842; Aphritis auropubescens Latreille, 1895; Mulio apiarius Fabricius, 1805; Microdon apiformis De Geer, 1776; Musca apiformis De Geer, 1776; Musca mutabilis Linnaeus, 1758

= Microdon mutabilis =

Species of fly

Microdon mutabilis is a species of hoverfly. It is found in many parts of Britain and Europe, though it is quite rare and even listed as endangered in some countries. The distinctive almost slug-like larvae live in ants' nests. They are hemispherical in shape, heavily armoured and believed to prey on the eggs and larvae of a number of ant species, including Formica lemani, Formica fusca, Lasius niger and Myrmica ruginodis. It was described by Carl Linnaeus in his 1758 10th edition of Systema Naturae.

== Description ==
=== Adults ===
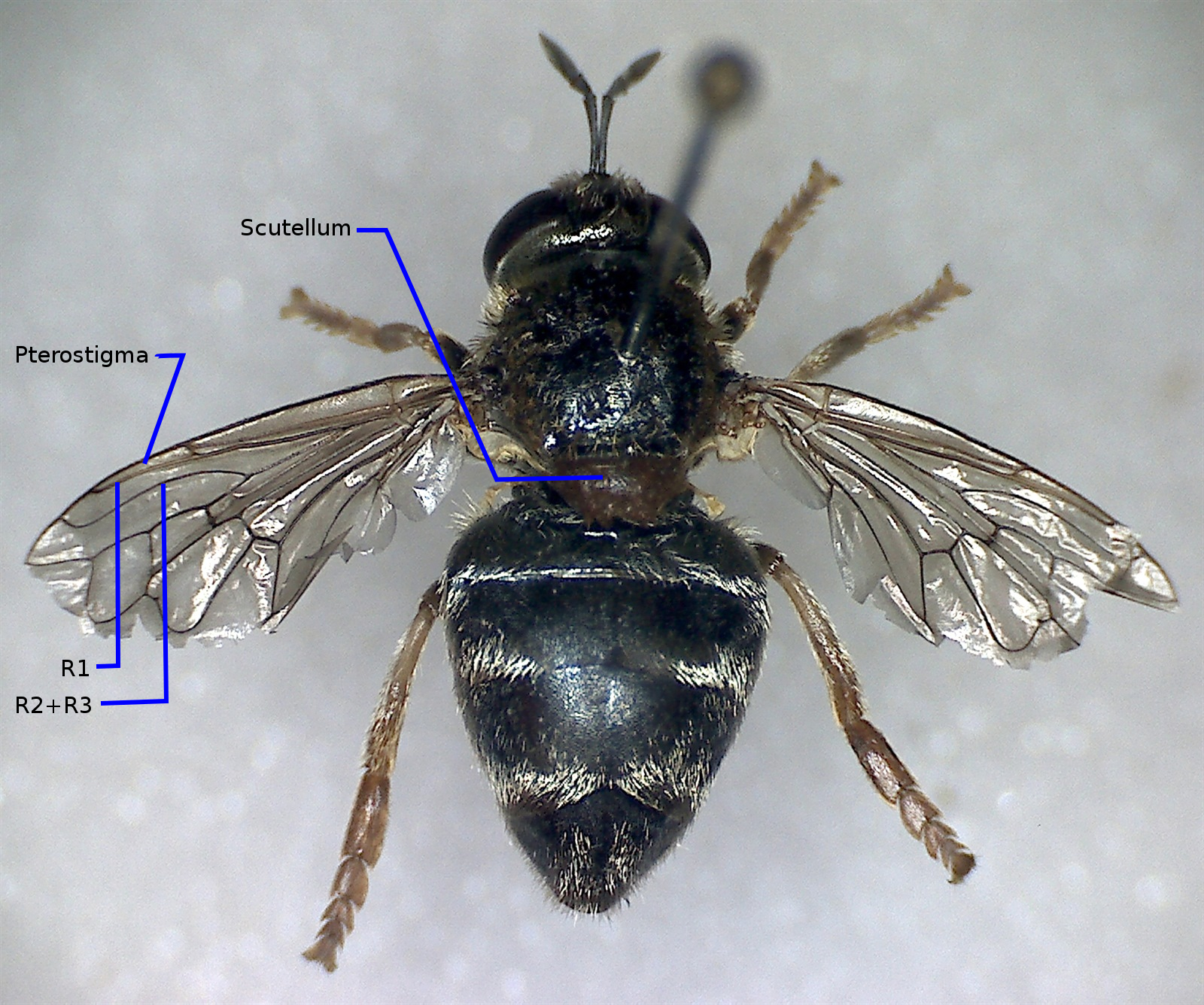
Adult defining characters of Microdon mutabilis. Pterostigma short: 2-2.5 times as long as the length of the costal section between distal ends of R_{1} and R_{2+3}. Scutellum red or darkened. Photo by Abalg and Gunnar Engan (NBIC)

Microdon mutabilis exhibits remarkable crypsis with its sister species, Mi. myrmicae in the adult stage. Mi. mutabilis adults are tentatively indicated to be distinguished from Mi. myrmicae by being 10 mm or longer (adult Mi. myrmicae are said not to exceed 10 mm). However, both species’ body length ranges between 9-11 mm. Both Mi. myrmicae and Mi. mutabilisare distinguishable from other Microdon species by the rust-red scutellum. The scutellum has small scutellar spines. The dorsum of the head and thorax is clothed in light-golden hairs. The femurs are black, whereas the tibiae are covered in light beige hairs and the tibiae and tarsomeres are a rusty orange similar to the scutellum. The wings are between 6–9 mm in length. The antennae are elongate and the abdomen ranges from grey to black. The male genitalia are figured by Doczkal and Schmid (1999).

=== Larvae ===
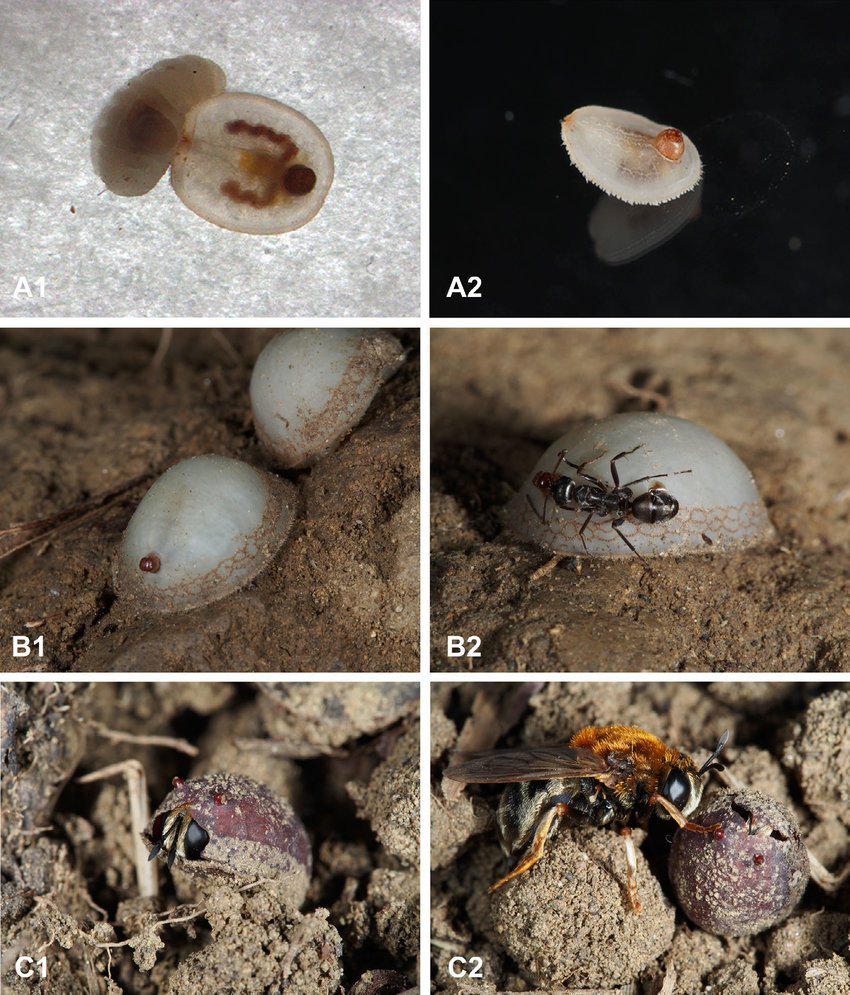
“Photographs of living Microdon mutabilis: A-second instar larva: A1-feeding on a larva of Formica cunicularia; A2-dorsolateral view; B-third instar larvae: B1-two larvae inside ant nest; B2-larva with a worker of Formica cunicularia; C1-adult emerging from puparium, anterior view; C2-adult with pupa”. From (Scarparo et al., 2017). Figure authored by Andrea Di Giulio. Copyright CC-BY 4.0.

The larval characters of Microdon are often more informative than adult characters due to morphological crypsis across the genus. General descriptions of the larval characters are as follows:

The first instar is roughly ovular in shape and slightly tapered anteriorly. It averages to about 1.5 mm long and 0.8 mm wide. The pseudocephalon is visible at this stage. The body maintains a whitish color throughout all larval instars. The first instar is dorsoventrally flattened, though it does exhibit slight dorsal convexity. The sclerotized posterior spiracular tubule is elongate and light brown in coloration. Marginal band is fringed and traces around most of the body’s circumference except for anterior-most area.

The second instar is considerably smaller and more circular than the first instar with an average length and width of 0.38 mm and 0.35 mm respectively. At this stage the dorsum is reticulated and roughly textured from various processes and microscupltures. The pseudocephalon is proportionately smaller and less visible. The posterior spiracular tubule is compressed into a dome and dark chestnut brown in coloration.

The third instar averages at a length of 1.09 mm and width of 0.85 mm. This stage is more dome-shaped in comparison to the previous two instars. A light brown band of reticulation traces around the body’s circumference. Posterior spiracular tubule is reduced to a chestnut colored nub.

The pupae are entirely sclerotized and retain the convexity of the third instar. They average to about 0.74 mm and 0.92 mm in width and length. The pupae are fully chestnut colored and have two anterior prothoracic spiracles as opposed to a single posterior spiracular tubule.

Studies on pupal morphology indicate that Mi. mutabilis and Mi. myrmicae pupae can be distinguished by the following characters: Mi. mutabilis pupae are hairless, whilst Mi. myrmicae pupae are dorsally hairy. Mi. mutabilis is also indicated to have a more defined reticulation pattern than Mi. myrmicae. It is also indicated that the anterior spiracles in Mi. mutabilis are equal in length and width or smaller, whereas they are longer and curved in Mi. myrmicae.

== Taxonomy ==
This species is part of the subfamily Microdontinae under the family Syrphidae, which is well known for its many instances of myrmecophily across the lineage.

The generic epithet Microdon means 'small tooth', and refers to this genus’ scutellar spines. The specific epithet mutabilis refers to this species’ variable abdominal coloration ranging from gray to black according to the original description.

The phylogenetic relationship between Microdon myrmicae and Microdon mutabilis remains a point of contention, with much of the discourse revolving around the species status lying in the host specificity and crypsis. Microdon myrmicae was formerly grouped within Microdon mutabilis until it was eventually separated in 2002 on the basis of ant host species and pupal morphology. However, records of potentially wider host ranges in Microdon mutabilis within the Formica genus including F. cunicularia and Lasius sp. challenges the validity of separating Microdon mutabilis and Microdon myrmicae solely on the basis of host species.

Immature morphological characters do point towards possible phylogenetic relationships between species more reliably than adult characters in Microdon, but it’s still difficult to reconstruct phylogenies solely based on these traits.

== Habitat and distribution ==
The habitat range of Mi. mutabilis is highly dependent on its host species distributions. It is commonly found in grasslands, forest clearings and rocky areas where its host ant species reside. Mi. mutabilis is usually found with populations in drier, well-grazed areas in comparison to its sister species, Mi. myrmicae which prefers waterlogged, boggy areas. The larvae are often found in Sphagnum moss and under stones, where its hosts can also be located.

Microdon mutabilis is currently thought to be largely restricted in Great Britain and Ireland, though there have been recent rediscoveries of this species taking place in Belgium after it was thought to be extinct. The true host range of Mi. mutabilis remains widely unknown and requires reevaluation because past data was collected before Mi. mutabilis and Mi. myrmicae became separate species. This species is rare and females exhibit remarkably low dispersal rates. In instances where dispersion is recorded to have occurred in female Mi. mutabilis, it took place over multiple decades. Microdon’s poor ability to disperse renders this genus vulnerable to anthropogenic change in habitat.

== Life cycle ==
Microdon mutabilis has an egg stage, three larval instars, a pupal stage, then adult stage. The female fly deposits batches of 3-6 eggs at host nests entrances (usually the nests of F. lemani, but other hosts have been recorded). It is at this stage where they are most vulnerable to rejection by the host colony. The slug-like larvae then hatch after 10-14 days and prey on ant larvae and pupae. The larval stage can last around 1-2 years, where the larvae undergo physiological and morphological changes as they complete their three instar stages. The larvae exhibit different growth rates and biennial larval duration as an adaptation to the myrmecophilous lifestyle, which is shared amongst other myrmecophilous insect groups. The larvae pupate for another 14 days before the adult emerges. Adults only live for less than a week. These flies tend to sedentary, and males have been known to take advantage of this lifestyle by waiting at the entrance of nests to mate with females before they’ve even finished sclerotizing.

== Host specificity ==
Microdon mutabilis locates its host species through volatile compounds such as methyl 6-methlysalicylate from F. lemani, which indicate host nest suitability for oviposition. Volatiles from M. scabrinodis were thought to be deterrents to females looking to oviposit. The compound methyl 6-methlysalicylate can be found in the mandibular glands of various Formicid lineages with different communicative functions, but these other lineages are allopatric to F. lemani which potentially explains the efficacy of using this compound as an orientation strategy. The function of methyl 6-methylsalicylate in F. lemani is postulated to be an alarm pheromone or serve as a chemical used for kin recognition. It seems unlikely that a single compound is used by these flies to orient themselves to potential host nests, though more studies are required.

Female flies exhibit low dispersal and a high level of local specificity to certain nests within larger F. lemani populations. Past studies indicated higher egg survivorship in nests closer in physical proximity to the maternal nest, with higher egg rejection occurring as distance from the maternal nest increased. Mi. mutabilis’ mimicry of host recognition compounds is indicated to be maternally inherited, and the relationship between survivorship and distance was thought to be related to the fact that F. lemani nests can be polygynous, where colonies are known to fragment but remain relatively genetically related to each other. More recent studies suggest higher genetic diversity within polygynous ant colonies for parasite defense leaves them more susceptible to social parasite infiltration due to more diversity in host recognition compounds. Mi. mutabilis’ sister species Mi. myrmicae is less locally constrained because its host, M. scabrinodis, exhibits more migratory behavior and tends to abandon its nests. F. lemani—Mi. mutabilis’ host—exhibits higher fidelity to its nest location. Thus, Mi. mutabilis evolved stronger philopatry with its host nests whilst Mi. myrmicae resorted to bet hedging strategies to account for M. scabrinodis’ nomadic nature. Past records of more flexible host ranges in Mi. mutabilis challenged the extent of host specificity in this genus, and suggest that the notion of extreme host specificity may be locally constrained, however this continues to be an area where more research is needed.
