= Omegasyrphus =

Scientific classification
- Kingdom: Animalia
- Phylum: Arthropoda
- Clade: Pancrustacea
- Class: Insecta
- Order: Diptera
- Family: Syrphidae
- Subfamily: Microdontinae
- Genus: Omegasyrphus; Giglio-Tos, 1891

Type species
- Microdon coarctatus Loew, 1864

Genus of flies

Omegasyrphus is a genus of hoverflies, with five known species. These are small Microdontinae flies with a distinctive abdominal shape; the second segment is widened, flattened, and flared, with its lateral margin subcircular, thickened, and rounded, and the rest of abdomen (third–fifth segments) narrowed and cylindrical. Larvae are found in ant nests. They are native to southern North America. The genus was previously treated as a subgenus of Microdon.

== Species ==
- Omegasyrphus baliopterus (Loew, 1872)
- Omegasyrphus coarctatus (Loew, 1864)
- Omegasyrphus gracilis (Bigot, 1883)
- Omegasyrphus painteri (Hull, 1922)
- Omegasyrphus pallipennis (Curran, 1925)
