= Metadon (fly) =

Scientific classification
- Kingdom: Animalia
- Phylum: Arthropoda
- Clade: Pancrustacea
- Class: Insecta
- Order: Diptera
- Family: Syrphidae
- Subfamily: Microdontinae
- Genus: Metadon; Reemer, 2013

Type species
- Microdon wulpii Mik, 1899

Genus of flies

Metadon is a genus of hoverfly containing 43 species. Most of the species were originally described in the genus Microdon.

== Species ==
- M. achterbergi Reemer, 2013
- M. aethiopicus (Rondani, 1873)
- M. albofascia (Hull, 1944)
- M. annandalei (Brunetti, 1907)
- M. apicalis (Walker, 1858)
- M. apis (Speiser, 1913)
- M. appendiculatus (Curran, 1929)
- M. aureomagnificus (Hull, 1944)
- M. auricinctus (Brunetti, 1908)
- M. auroscutatus (Curran, 1928)
- M. bicolor (Sack, 1922)
- M. bicoloratus (Hull, 1944)
- M. bifasciatus (Matsumura, 1916)
- M. brunneipennis (Huo, Ren & Zheng, 2007)
- M. captum (Speiser, 1913)
- M. erythrocephalus (Bezzi, 1915)
- M. flavipes (Brunetti, 1908)
- M. fulvicornis (Walker, 1858)
- M. fulvipes (Meijere, 1908)
- M. fuscicornis (Sasakawa, 1960)
- M. fuscus (Meijere, 1908)
- M. inappendiculatus (Curran, 1929)
- M. inermis (Loew, 1858)
- M. modesticolor (Hull, 1944)
- M. montis (Keiser, 1958)
- M. mydas (Bezzi, 1915)
- M. mynthes (Séguy, 1953)
- M. pallidus (Bezzi, 1915)
- M. pendelburyi (Curran, 1931)
- M. persicus Gilasian & Reemer, 2015
- M. pingliensis (Huo, Ren & Zheng, 2007)
- M. pretiosus (Curran, 1931)
- M. punctulatus (Wiedemann, 1824)
- M. robinsoni (Curran, 1928)
- M. ruficaudus (Brunetti, 1907)
- M. rugosus (Bezzi, 1915)
- M. rutiliventris (Vockeroth, 1975)
- M. rutilus (Keiser, 1952)
- M. sacki (Goot, 1964)
- M. spuribifasciatus (Huo, Ren & Zheng, 2007)
- M. squamipennis (Brunetti, 1923)
- M. taprobanicus (Keiser, 1958)
- M. wulpii (Mik, 1899)
