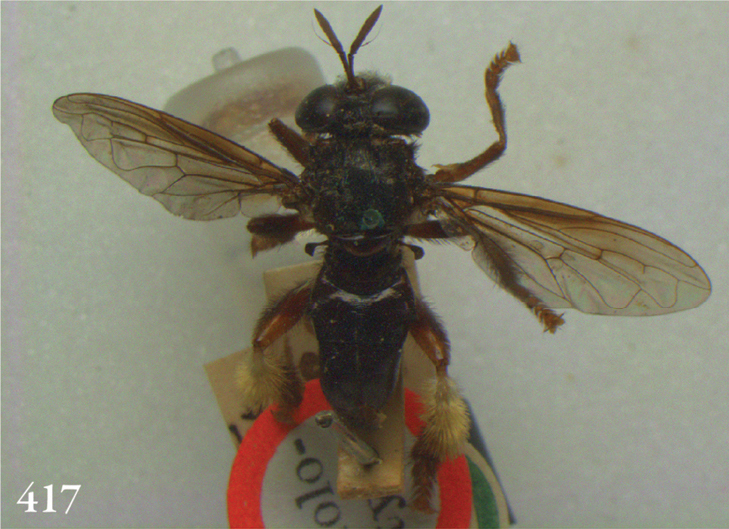
- Holotype of Ubristes flavitibia

Scientific classification
- Kingdom: Animalia
- Phylum: Arthropoda
- Class: Insecta
- Order: Diptera
- Family: Syrphidae
- Subfamily: Microdontinae
- Genus: Ubristes; Walker, 1852

Type species
- Ubristes flavitibia Walker, 1852

= Ubristes =

Genus of flies

Ubristes is a genus of hoverflies, with four known species. All are characterized by their metatibiae, which are usually enlarged, but always with a brush of long pile along the dorsal edges. These flies are probably mimics of the stingless bees in the tribe Meliponini.

The presence or absence of the appendix on vein R4+5 is variable within this group. The type species of Carreramyia, Hypselosyrphus and Stipomorpha were formerly included in Ubristes; the latter two genera were also considered subgroups of Ubristes. All three are now considered separate genera by Reemer & Ståhls (2013).

== Biology ==
Larvae are found in ant nests.

== Distribution ==
They are native to the Neotropics.

== Species ==
- U. flavitibia Walker, 1852
- U. ictericus Reemer, 2013
- U. jaguarinus Reemer, 2013
- U. rex Reemer, 2017
