= Peradon =

Scientific classification
- Kingdom: Animalia
- Phylum: Arthropoda
- Clade: Pancrustacea
- Class: Insecta
- Order: Diptera
- Family: Syrphidae
- Subfamily: Microdontinae
- Genus: Peradon; Reemer, 2013

Type species
- Mulio bidens Fabricius, 1805

Genus of flies

Peradon is a genus of hoverfly from the Neotropical realm, containing 31 species. Many of the species were originally described in the genus Microdon.

== Species ==
Species in Peradon include:

- Peradon angustiventris (Macquart, 1855)
- Peradon angustus (Macquart, 1846)
- Peradon aureoscutus (Hull, 1943)
- Peradon aureus (Hull, 1944)
- Peradon aurifascia (Hull, 1944)
- Peradon aurigaster (Hull, 1941)
- Peradon ballux Reemer in Reemer, Skevington & Kelso, 2019
- Peradon bidens (Fabricius, 1805)
- Peradon bispina (Hull, 1943)
- Peradon brevis Reemer in Reemer, Skevington & Kelso, 2019
- Peradon chrysopygus (Giglio-Tos, 1892)
- Peradon costaricensis Reemer in Reemer, Skevington & Kelso, 2019
- Peradon diaphanus (Sack, 1921)
- Peradon elongata (Hull, 1943)
- Peradon fenestratus (Hull, 1943)
- Peradon flavipennis (Curran, 1925)
- Peradon flavofascium (Curran, 1925)
- Peradon hermetia (Curran, 1936)
- Peradon hermetoides (Curran, 1940)
- Peradon luridescens (Walker, 1857)
- Peradon niger (Williston, 1891)
- Peradon normalis (Curran, 1925)
- Peradon notialus Reemer in Reemer, Skevington & Kelso, 2019
- Peradon oligonax (Hull, 1944)
- Peradon palpator Reemer in Reemer, Skevington & Kelso, 2019
- Peradon pompiloides Reemer in Reemer, Skevington & Kelso, 2019
- Peradon satyricus Reemer, 2014
- Peradon sciarus Reemer, 2014
- Peradon surinamensis Reemer in Reemer, Skevington & Kelso, 2019
- Peradon trilinea (Hull, 1943)
- Peradon trivittatum (Curran, 1925)

The following are synonyms of other species:

- Peradon flavomarginatum (Curran, 1925): synonym of Peradon bidens (Fabricius, 1805)
- Peradon langi (Curran, 1925): synonym of Peradon bidens (Fabricius, 1805)
