= Chrysidimyia =

Scientific classification
- Kingdom: Animalia
- Phylum: Arthropoda
- Class: Insecta
- Order: Diptera
- Family: Syrphidae
- Subfamily: Microdontinae
- Genus: Chrysidimyia; Hull, 1937
- Species: C. chrysidimima

Binomial name
- Chrysidimyia chrysidimima Hull, 1937

Synonyms
- Genus: Chysidimyia Hull, 1937; Species: Chrysidimyia chrysidiformis Hull, 1944; Chrysidimyia lazuli Hull, 1944; Microdon granulatus Curran, 1940

Genus of flies

Chrysidimyia is a genus of hoverflies from Brazil, with only one known species, Chrysidimyia chrysidimima. The genus was described as a small metallic green fly with dense punctation that had an "astonishing resemblance" to chrysidid wasps.
