= R. australis =

R. australis may refer to:

- Ramphotyphlops australis, a non-venomous blind snake species
- Raphia australis, the giant palm or rafia, a raffia palm species found in Mozambique and South Africa
- Remora australis, the whalesucker, a fish species found worldwide in tropical and warm waters
- Rhopalosyrphus australis, a hoverfly species in the genus Rhopalosyrphus
- Rostanga australis, a sea slug species in the genus Rostanga
- Rostratula australis, the Australian painted snipe, a medium-sized, long-billed wader species
- Rickettsia australis

== See also ==
- Australis (disambiguation)
