= Kryptopyga =

Scientific classification
- Kingdom: Animalia
- Phylum: Arthropoda
- Class: Insecta
- Order: Diptera
- Family: Syrphidae
- Subfamily: Microdontinae
- Genus: Kryptopyga; Hull, 1944

Genus of flies

Kryptopyga is a genus of hoverfly native to Java, containing two species.

== Species ==
- K. pendulosa Hull, 1944
- K. sulawesiana Reemer, 2013
