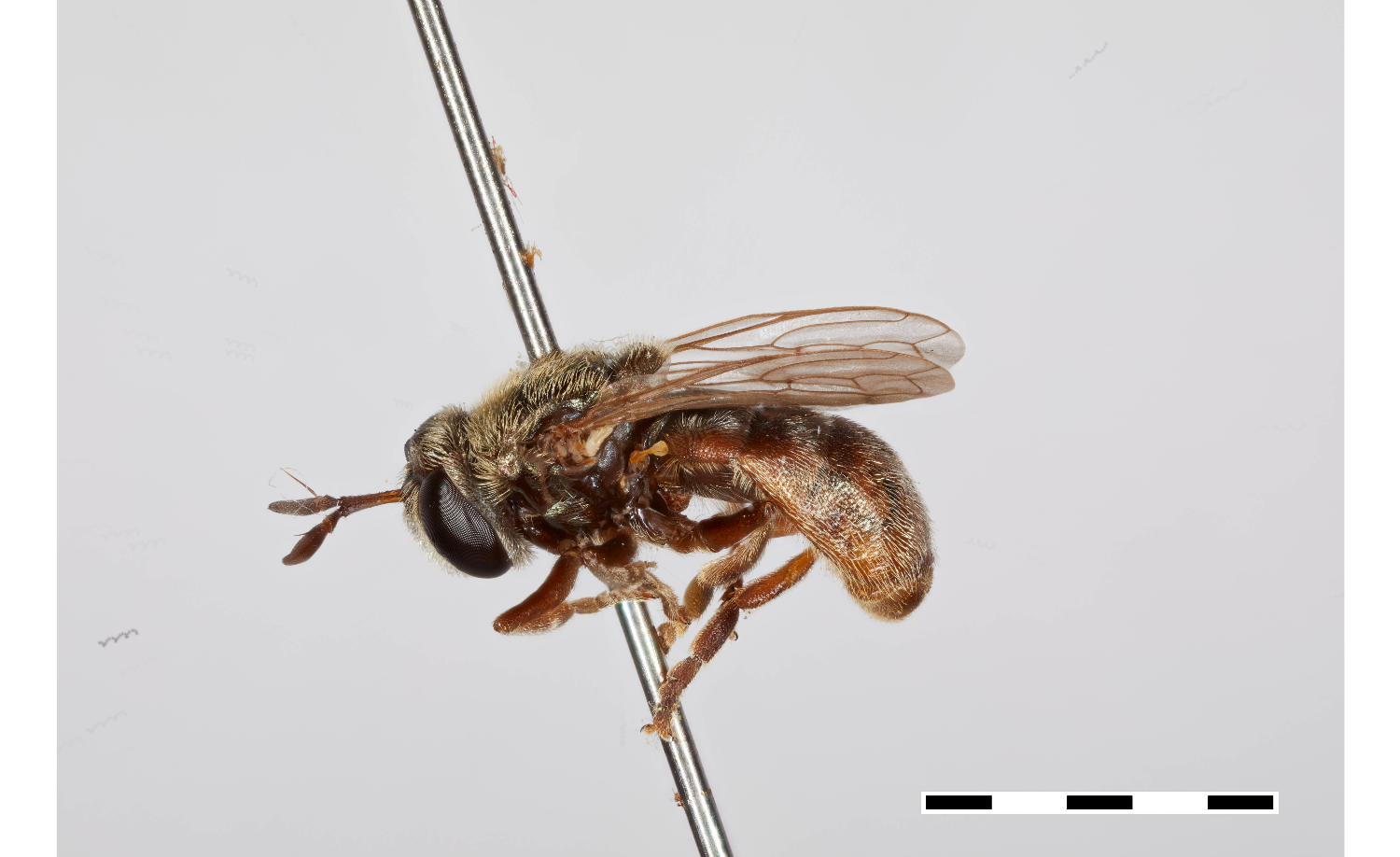
- M. abstrusus lateral holotype

Scientific classification
- Kingdom: Animalia
- Phylum: Arthropoda
- Clade: Pancrustacea
- Class: Insecta
- Order: Diptera
- Family: Syrphidae
- Subfamily: Microdontinae
- Genus: Microdon
- Species: M. abstrusus

Binomial name
- Microdon abstrusus Thompson, 1981

= Microdon abstrusus =

Species of insect

Microdon abstrusus (Thompson, 1981), the hidden ant fly, is a rare and local species of syrphid fly observed in central Pennsylvania. Hoverflies can remain nearly motionless in flight. The adults are also known as flower flies for they are commonly found on flowers though microdon species are seldom seen around flowers. Larvae have been noted in Formica exsectoides ant nests.

== Description ==
Head

The head is brownish black covered with pale yellow pile and a shiny face.The face is broadly shaped and occupies about half of the head's width at its broadest part. The gena is pale pollinose. The front and vertex are shiny and are around a quarter of the head's width at the narrowest point. The ocellar triangle is wide with a longitudinal to latitudinal axis ratio of around 0.4.; The eyes are bare and the occiput is pale colored with pollen . The third antennal segment is longer than the arista and is blunt apically with a ratio of 2.5:1.0:2.8.

Thorax

The thorax is brownish-black with a slight greenish-blue iridescence and has pale yellow hair. The head is extensively shiny and hairy above the front coxa. The propleuron is pollinose and the sternopleuron has an anteroventral hair patch. The scutellum is convex apically and does not have spines.

Abdomen

The abdomen is brownish-black with a slight greenish-blue iridescence and has pale yellow hair, except for black hair narrowly basomedially on the 3rd and 4th terga. The abdomen is broad, broader than the thorax, and does not have parallel sides. The 2nd tergum does not have 3 distinct depressions and is not subequal to the 3rd tergum. The first abdominal sternum is extensively pale-haired and well developed.

Wings

The wings are hyaline and microtrichose with an epaulet (tegula) that is black-haired. The basicosta is yellow-haired. The apical crossvein is evenly curved and does not have a sharp angulation or an external spur. The squama and halter are pale yellow.

Legs

The legs are predominantly brownish-black, with orange coloring present ventrally on the femora and tibiae. The legs have pale yellow hair.
