= Paramicrodon =

Scientific classification
- Kingdom: Animalia
- Phylum: Arthropoda
- Clade: Pancrustacea
- Class: Insecta
- Order: Diptera
- Family: Syrphidae
- Subfamily: Microdontinae
- Genus: Paramicrodon; Meijere, 1913

Type species
- Paramicrodon lorentzi de Meijere, 1913

Synonyms
- Syrphinella Hervé-Bazin, 1926; Myxogasteroides Shiraki, 1930; Nannomyrmecomyia Hull, 1945

Genus of flies

Paramicrodon is a genus of hoverflies, with eight known species. They differ from Microdon by their short antennae and the lack of appendices on vein R4+5.

== Biology ==
Larvae are found in ant nests.

== Distribution ==
They are native to Oriental, Australian, and Neotropical regions.

== Species ==
- P. cinctellus (Sack, 1926)
- P. delicatulus Hull, 1937
- P. flukei Curran, 1936
- P. lorentzi Meijere, 1913
- P. miranda (Herve-Bazin, 1926)
- P. nigripennis (Sack, 1922)
- P. novus Hull, 1937
- P. toxopei Meijere, 1929
