= Spheginobaccha =

Scientific classification
- Kingdom: Animalia
- Phylum: Arthropoda
- Class: Insecta
- Order: Diptera
- Family: Syrphidae
- Subfamily: Microdontinae
- Tribe: Spheginobacchini; Thompson, 1972
- Genus: Spheginobaccha; Meijere, 1908

Type species
- Sphegina macropoda Bigot, 1883

Synonyms
- Dexiosyrphus Hull, 1944

Genus of flies

Spheginobaccha is a genus of hoverflies, with 15 known species. The genus is readily separated from other microdons by the incomplete metathoracic bridge, round/oval basoflagellomere, occiput with a dorsolateral crease, and other characters. It is the only genus in the tribe Spheginobacchini.

== Biology ==
Larvae are found in ant nests.

== Distribution ==
They are native to Africa (five species) and Asia (eight species).

== Species ==
The macropoda group (Asia):

- Spheginobaccha aethusa (Walker, 1849)
- Spheginobaccha chillcotti Thompson, 1974
- Spheginobaccha demeijerei van Doesburg, 1968
- Spheginobaccha duplex (Walker, 1857)
- Spheginobaccha humeralis (Sack, 1926)
- Spheginobaccha knutsoni Thompson, 1974
- Spheginobaccha lieftincki Doesburg, 1968
- Spheginobaccha macropoda (Bigot, 1883)
- Spheginobaccha melancholia Hull, 1937
- Spheginobaccha vandoesburgi Thompson, 1974

The rotundiceps group (South Africa):

- Spheginobaccha dexioides Hull, 1944
- Spheginobaccha dubia Thompson, 1974
- Spheginobaccha pamela Thompson & Hauser, 2015
- Spheginobaccha rotundiceps (Loew, 1857)
- Spheginobaccha stuckenbergi Thompson & Hauser, 2015

The perialla group (Malawi):

- Spheginobaccha perialla Thompson, 1974

The ruginosa group (Madagascar):

- Spheginobaccha ruginosa Dirickx, 1995
