= Pseudomicrodon =

Scientific classification
- Kingdom: Animalia
- Phylum: Arthropoda
- Class: Insecta
- Order: Diptera
- Family: Syrphidae
- Subfamily: Microdontinae
- Genus: Pseudomicrodon; Hull, 1937

Type species
- Pseudomicrodon beebei Curran, 1936

Genus of flies

Pseudomicrodon is a genus of hoverflies, with 14 known species. All are species with petiolate abdomens.

== Biology ==
Larvae are found in ant nests.

== Distribution ==
They are native to the New World tropics.

== Species ==
Species in Pseudomicrodon include:

- Pseudomicrodon auricinctus (Sack, 1931)
- Pseudomicrodon batesi (Shannon, 1927)
- Pseudomicrodon bellulus (Williston, 1891)
- Pseudomicrodon biluminiferus (Hull, 1944)
- Pseudomicrodon chrysostypus (Thompson, 2004)
- Pseudomicrodon claripennis (Hine, 1914)
- Pseudomicrodon conops (Curran, 1940)
- Pseudomicrodon corona (Curran, 1940)
- Pseudomicrodon nigrispinosus (Shannon, 1927)
- Pseudomicrodon pilosops (Marinoni, 2004)
- Pseudomicrodon polistoides Reemer, 2013
- Pseudomicrodon rheochryssus (Hull, 1944)
- Pseudomicrodon seabrai Papavero, 1962
- Pseudomicrodon smiti Reemer, 2013

The following are synonyms of other species:

- Pseudomicrodon beebei (Curran, 1936): synonym of Pseudomicrodon batesi (Shannon, 1927)
