= Rhoga =

Scientific classification
- Kingdom: Animalia
- Phylum: Arthropoda
- Class: Insecta
- Order: Diptera
- Family: Syrphidae
- Subfamily: Microdontinae
- Genus: Rhoga; Walker, 1857

Type species
- Rhoga lutescens Walker, 1857

Synonyms
- Papiliomyia Hull, 1937

Genus of flies

Rhoga is a genus of hoverflies, with five known species. All are small, delicate, pale yellowish flies, with distinct black pilose brushes on their metatibiae. These flies are probably mimics of stingless bees of the tribe Meliponini.

== Biology ==
Larvae are found in ant nests.

== Distribution ==
They are native to the Neotropics.

== Species ==
- R. lutescens Walker, 1857
- R. maculata (Shannon, 1927)
- R. mellea (Curran, 1940)
- R. sepulchrasilva (Hull, 1937)
- R. xanthoprosopus Barretto & Lane, 1947
