= Microdon ruficrus =

Scientific classification
- Kingdom: Animalia
- Phylum: Arthropoda
- Class: Insecta
- Order: Diptera
- Family: Syrphidae
- Subfamily: Microdontinae
- Genus: Microdon
- Species: M. ruficrus

Binomial name
- Microdon ruficrus Williston 1887

Synonyms
- Microdon basicornis Curran, 1925; Microdon champlaini Curran, 1925; Microdon tristis subsp. ruficrus Williston, 1887

Species of insect

Microdon ruficrus (Williston 1887), the spiny-shield ant fly, is an uncommon species of syrphid fly observed in the eastern United States and adjacent Canada. Hoverflies can remain nearly motionless in flight. The adults are also known as flower flies for they are commonly found on flowers from which they get both energy-giving nectar and protein-rich pollen. Larvae have been found from the nests of Lasius americanus formerly Lasius alienus. GBIF external link to images

== Description ==
Length

9–11.5 mm (0.35–0.45 in)

=== Male ===
Head

The face and front are greenish black, with a slight bronze or bluish reflection, not steel blue like in M.piperi. The facial depressions are angled or missing, but there is some greyish pollen there. The face is convex and receding more on the lower half, while the pile is whitish yellow and somewhat cinereous above. The face is widest below, with the front considerably narrowed and the transverse depression rather deep, narrow, and polished. The polished area above the antennae reaches broadly to the transverse suture and has a peculiar roughening or swelling near its upper end. The posterior ocelli are a little remote, with their triangle being large. The vertex bump is usually very small and not more densely punctured than the front, while the front is finely punctured and shining. The pile is black in front of the transverse depression and before the ocellar triangle, colored like that of the face, narrowly across the depression and above. The occiput is greenish or bluish black, with pale pile, while the antennae are black. The first segment is more or less reddish basally, and not as long as the two following segments combined. The third segment is not quite as long as the first, broadest subbasally and gradually tapering to the rather blunt tip. The arista is slender, reddish yellow, and shorter than the third segment.

Thorax The thorax is metallic greenish or bluish black, with the disc chiefly bronzed and three more or less distinct broad cupreous stripes that are somewhat fused posteriorly. The pleurae below and the pectus are very shining and blackish. The pile of the thorax and scutellum is pale brassy yellow, but always reddish or fulvous, just on the disc. The scutellum is transverse, with the end slightly excavated, more so in the immediate middle. It bears on each side of the excavation a moderately sized spine that is not pilose. The spine is actually situated upon a small tubercle which varies somewhat in size and bears short pile in most cases.

Abdomen

The abdomen is dull black, with the sides and apex more or less obscure luteous. The first segment is polished black, while the second has more or less metallic greenish or bluish reflection. Its sides have a deep, broad depression that leaves the margins strongly convex, especially in front. The third segment is about one and one-half times as long as the second and slightly transversely depressed basally on either side, with or without a shallow depression inside the posterior angles. The fourth segment is about as long as the first three combined, with the lateral depressions shallow and the apical V-shaped depression more distinct basally. The arms of the apical depression become obsolete, indistinct or missing. The pile is whitish yellow, present on the third segment except for the sides and a narrow, broadly interrupted posterior margin, and the base of the fourth. The pile is slightly broadened laterally and produced as a triangle in the middle, short black pilose.

Wings

The wings somewhat cinereous (ashy grey) or brownish, the color more condensed on the cross-veins. The stump of vein arises about the middle of the first posterior cell, (r4+5) is short and directed a little outwards. The spurious vein is ending just behind its tip. The apical cross-vein is almost straight from just after the bulb, ending opposite the tip of the second vein(R2+3) . The squamae are almost white, with white fringe. Halteres pale yellow.

Legs

The femora are black; tibiae and tarsi brown, the latter becoming pale apically; pile of the tibiae pallid, somewhat obscuring the ground color, beneath the tarsi and inside the front tibiae, more golden. Legs simple.

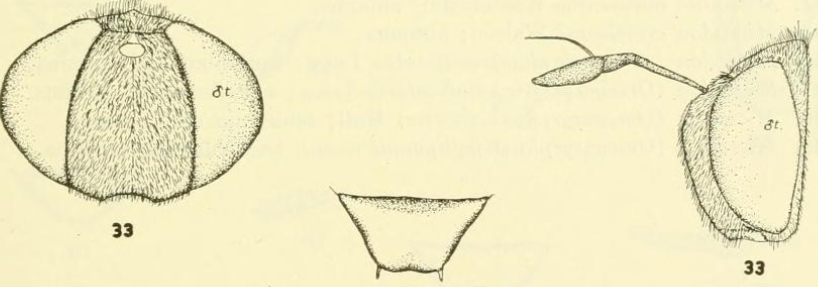
head and thorax

=== Female ===
The front is scarcely narrowed above, while the face is slightly wider below. The sides of the face just below the antennae are very slightly depressed, with the usual facial depressions almost obsolete or indistinct. However, the pollen is nearly twice as wide as in the male. The front does not have a distinct transverse groove, but it is more densely punctured on the lateral triangles just below its usual location. A distinct line runs from just above the antennae to the facial depressions. The cupreous stripes of the thorax are narrower and more distinct, while the pile on the disc, while darker than elsewhere, is bright yellow instead of reddish. The scutellum is slightly concave, with the spines situated upon somewhat more conical swellings that are usually more pilose, but the spines themselves are quite bare. The fourth abdominal segment is about one and one-half times as long as the third, while the lateral depressions are shallow. The fifth segment is a little longer than the fourth, with its end truncate and the lateral depressions not usually deep. The pile of the fourth segment is the same as on the third, but the pale pile is a little more extensive inside the posterior angles. The black pile on the fifth segment is limited to a broad, incomplete basal band emitting a median triangular area.
