= Microdon cothurnatus =

Scientific classification
- Kingdom: Animalia
- Phylum: Arthropoda
- Class: Insecta
- Order: Diptera
- Family: Syrphidae
- Subfamily: Microdontinae
- Genus: Microdon
- Species: M. cothurnatus

Binomial name
- Microdon cothurnatus Bigot, 1884

Synonyms
- Microdon cockerelli (Jones, 1922)

Species of insect

Microdon cothurnatus, the orange-legged ant fly, is a species of syrphid fly observed across the Northern United States and Canada. Hoverflies can remain nearly motionless in flight. The adults are also known as flower flies for they are commonly found on flowers except Microdon species are seldom observed around flowers. Larvae have been found in several species of ant.

== Description ==
The insect has fawn-colored antennae and a brown head. Its face is whitish, with a black front marked by four grayish-white spots. The thorax is opaque and black, marked on both sides with a yellowish lateral band from the shoulder to the suture, as well as another oblique one on the flanks. The scutellum is yellowish with a blackish center. The abdomen is pale reddish, with the back of the first segment and the posterior borders of the last ones being dark brown. Its legs are yellow with black tips, posterior femora that are dark brown with yellowish pale rings widely distributed over them, posterior tibiae that are black with a broadly paler yellow base, and brownish tarsi. The wings are clear with a broad yellowish base and a narrow apical brown border. translated from J.-M.-F. Bigot.
