= Ceriomicrodon =

Scientific classification
- Kingdom: Animalia
- Phylum: Arthropoda
- Class: Insecta
- Order: Diptera
- Family: Syrphidae
- Subfamily: Microdontinae
- Genus: Ceriomicrodon; Hull, 1937
- Species: C. petiolatus

Binomial name
- Ceriomicrodon petiolatus Hull, 1937

Genus of flies

Ceriomicrodon is a genus of hoverflies. The only known species, Ceriomicrodon petiolatus, lives in the Brazilian states Mato Grosso, Roraima, Amazonas, Maranhão and Rondônia. Its biology is poorly known, but the larvae are assumed to live in ant nests. Only a few specimens were known of the species until 2014, when the species was redescribed.
