= Paragodon =

Scientific classification
- Kingdom: Animalia
- Phylum: Arthropoda
- Class: Insecta
- Order: Diptera
- Family: Syrphidae
- Subfamily: Microdontinae
- Genus: Paragodon; Thompson, 1969
- Species: P. paragoides

Binomial name
- Paragodon paragoides Thompson, 1969

Genus of flies

Paragodon paragoides is a small (4–5 mm) hoverfly which differs from other hoverflies by its simple male genitalia, and was accordingly considered the most primitive microdontine species. It is the sole member of the genus Paragodon, as the other known species was removed to a separate genus, Surimyia.

== Biology ==
Larvae are presumably found in ant nests.

== Distribution ==
They are native to South America.
