= Oligeriops =

Scientific classification
- Kingdom: Animalia
- Phylum: Arthropoda
- Clade: Pancrustacea
- Class: Insecta
- Order: Diptera
- Family: Syrphidae
- Subfamily: Microdontinae
- Genus: Oligeriops; Hull, 1937

Type species
- Microdon chalybeus Ferguson, 1926

Species
- Oligeriops chalybeus; Oligeriops dimorphon; Oligeriops iridomyrmex; Oligeriops moestus; Oligeriops occidentalis

Genus of flies

Oligeriops is a genus of hoverfly from Australia. They are characterised by the reduced size of the eyes, and the genus includes five described species. It was previously considered a synonym of Microdon.

== Species ==
- Oligeriops chalybeus (Ferguson, 1926)
- Oligeriops dimorphon (Ferguson, 1926)
- Oligeriops iridomyrmex (Shannon, 1927)
- Oligeriops moestus (Ferguson, 1926)
- Oligeriops occidentalis (Ferguson, 1926)
