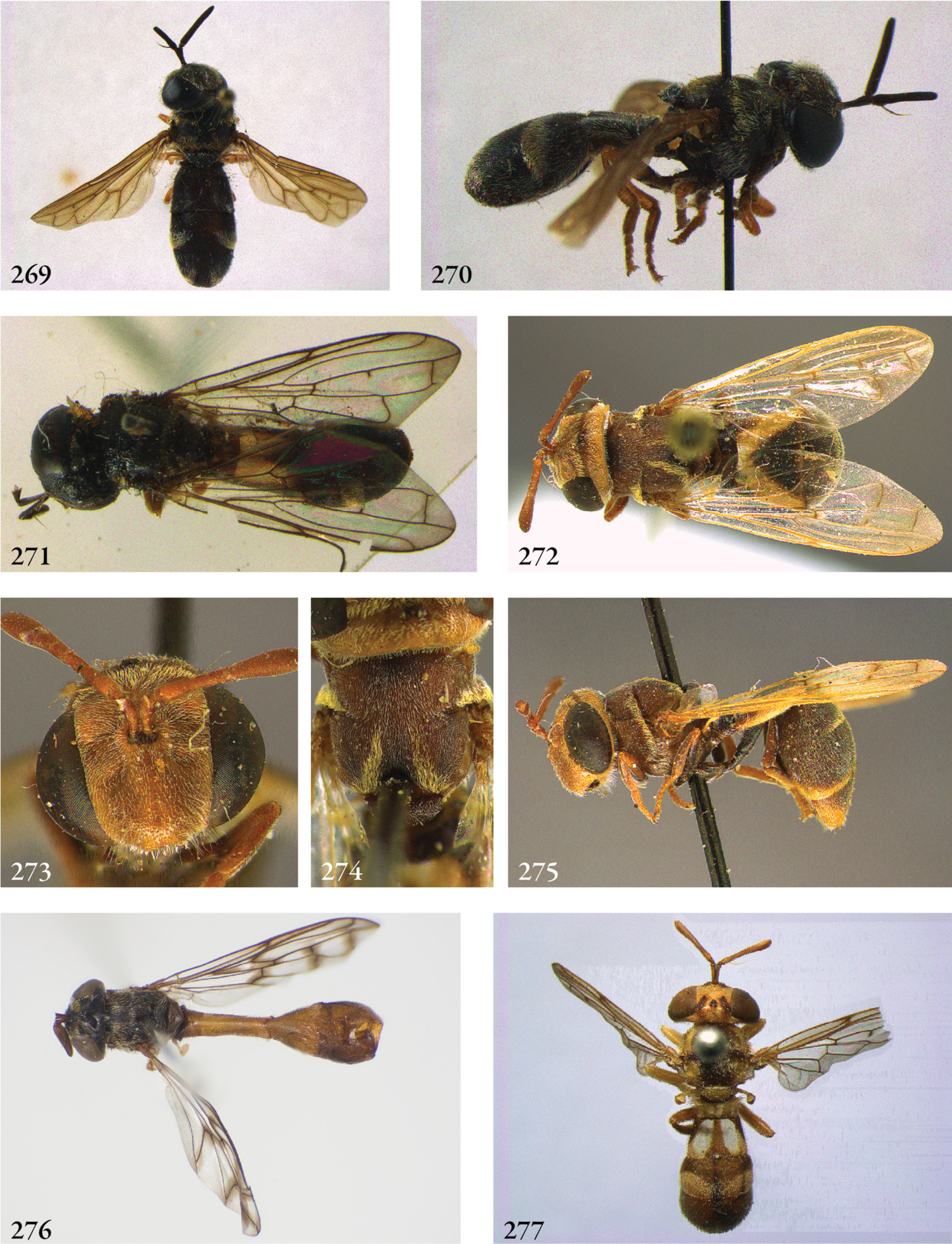

Scientific classification
- Kingdom: Animalia
- Phylum: Arthropoda
- Class: Insecta
- Order: Diptera
- Family: Syrphidae
- Subfamily: Microdontinae
- Genus: Paramixogaster; Brunetti, 1923

Type species
- Mixogaster vespiformis Brunetti, 1923

Synonyms
- Paramixogasteroides Shiraki, 1930; Tanaopicera Hull, 1945

= Paramixogaster =

Genus of flies

Paramixogaster is a genus of hoverflies, with fewer than 30 known species. Paramixogaster has an appendix on vein R4+5 that is absent in Mixogaster.

== Biology ==
Larvae are found in ant nests, or otherwise in association with ants.

== Distribution ==
They are native to parts of Asia and Australia.

== Species ==
- P. acantholepidis (Speiser, 1913)
- P. aphritina (Thomson, 1869)
- P. brunetti Reemer, 2013 (new name for Mixogaster vespiformis Brunetti, 1913)
- P. contracta (Brunetti, 1923)
- P. conveniens (Brunetti, 1923)
- P. crematogastri (Speiser, 1913)
- P. daveyi (Knab & Malloch, 1912)
- P. elisabethae (Keiser, 1971)
- P. fujianensis Cheng, 2012
- P. gayi (Paramonov, 1957)
- P. halmaherensis Reemer, 2024
- P. icariiformis Pendlebury, 1927
- P. illucens (Bezzi, 1915)
- P. indica (Doleschall, 1857)
- P. jubata Reemer, 2024
- P. kodaiana Sankararaman & Reemer, 2024
- P. luxor (Curran, 1931)
- P. odyneroides (Meijere, 1908)
- P. omeana (Paramonov, 1957)
- P. petiolata (Hull, 1944)
- P. piptota Reemer, 2013
- P. praetermissa (Ferguson, 1926)
- P. sacki Reemer, 2013 (new name for Myxogaster variegata Sack, 1922)
- P. sulawesiana Reemer, 2024
- P. variegata (Walker, 1852)
- P. vespiformis (Meijere, 1908)
- P. yunnanensis Cheng, 2012
