= Microdon ocellaris =

Scientific classification
- Kingdom: Animalia
- Phylum: Arthropoda
- Class: Insecta
- Order: Diptera
- Family: Syrphidae
- Subfamily: Microdontinae
- Genus: Microdon
- Species: M. ocellaris

Binomial name
- Microdon ocellaris Curran 1924

Species of insect

Microdon ocellaris (Curran 1924), the hairy-legged ant fly, is a rare species of syrphid fly observed in the eastern United States. Hoverflies can remain nearly motionless in flight. The adults are also known as flower flies for they are commonly found on flowers, from which they get both energy-giving nectar and protein-rich pollen (though Microdon species are seldom seen on flowers). The larvae have been found in the nests of Formica pallidefulva.

== Description ==
For terminology see Speight key to genera and glossary

Length

14 mm.

Head

The frons of the female is over one-third the width of the head. The eyes are bare, bronze green with long yellow pile. The face has nearly parallel sides, a little convex above but strongly so below. The side depressions and a narrow margin along the orbits are greyish silvery pollinose. The front of the face is scarcely narrowed above and lacking a complete transverse depression, but there is a distinct depression extending about one-third the distance across the lower portion, with its inner margin running obliquely downwards to join the upper end of the facial depression. The innermost point of this depression has a slender depression running into the upper corners of the polished, squarish, black area above the antennae. The ocellar triangle is small. The bump at the vertex is squarish, large, not actually connected with the ocellar triangle, and its upper surface is rugosely granular. The pile of the head is rather thick and long, brassy straw yellow, and there is a stripe across the middle of the nearly bare gena. The antennae are black. the first segment is scarcely as long as the two following combined. The second is about one-third and as long as the third. The third segment is rather stout, thickest at about its basal third, with its end obtusely rounded. The first segment is somewhat brownish black basally The arista is reddish, slender, and about as long as the third segment.

Thorax

The thorax has moderately long, thick, brassy yellow pile. The scutellum is swollen, and its rear angles are bulbous, and more concave. just at its middle. The top of the scutellum is somewhat transverse, and the spines are broadly separated, stout, and the same color as the scutellum. The spines are situated on the swellings, much above the lower margin.

Abdomen

The first segment is black. The second segment is twice as long as the first and a bit lower on its back side. The third segment is not quite twice as long as the second and has shallow depressions at the corners towards the back. The fourth segment is one and one-quarter times as long as the third and has shallow depressions at the sides. The fifth segment has a diamond shape, and its sides are pulled inwards. The fourth and fifth segments have a dark line down the middle. The hair on the segments is mostly thick and yellow with some shorter black hair at the bases of the third, fourth, and fifth segments that make triangular patches, but these patches do not reach the edges of the abdomen.

Wings

The wings are somewhat greyish, like ash. The apical cross-veins are faintly clouded, while the stigma has a yellowish tinge. The first posterior cell r4+5 is long and extends backwards, as the apical cross-vein comes close to the edge of the wing before sharply bending to join the third longitudinal vein, R4+5, just before the tip of the second. The stump of the vein projecting into the first posterior cell arises from the middle and is very sharply curved towards the end of the sinuous vein. The squamae are yellow with yellow fringe. Halteres yellow.

Legs

The legs are brownish with the tibiae and tarsi so densely covered with subappressed shining pale yellow pile as to obscure the ground color.The inside of the front tibiae above and the pads of their tarsi are golden.
