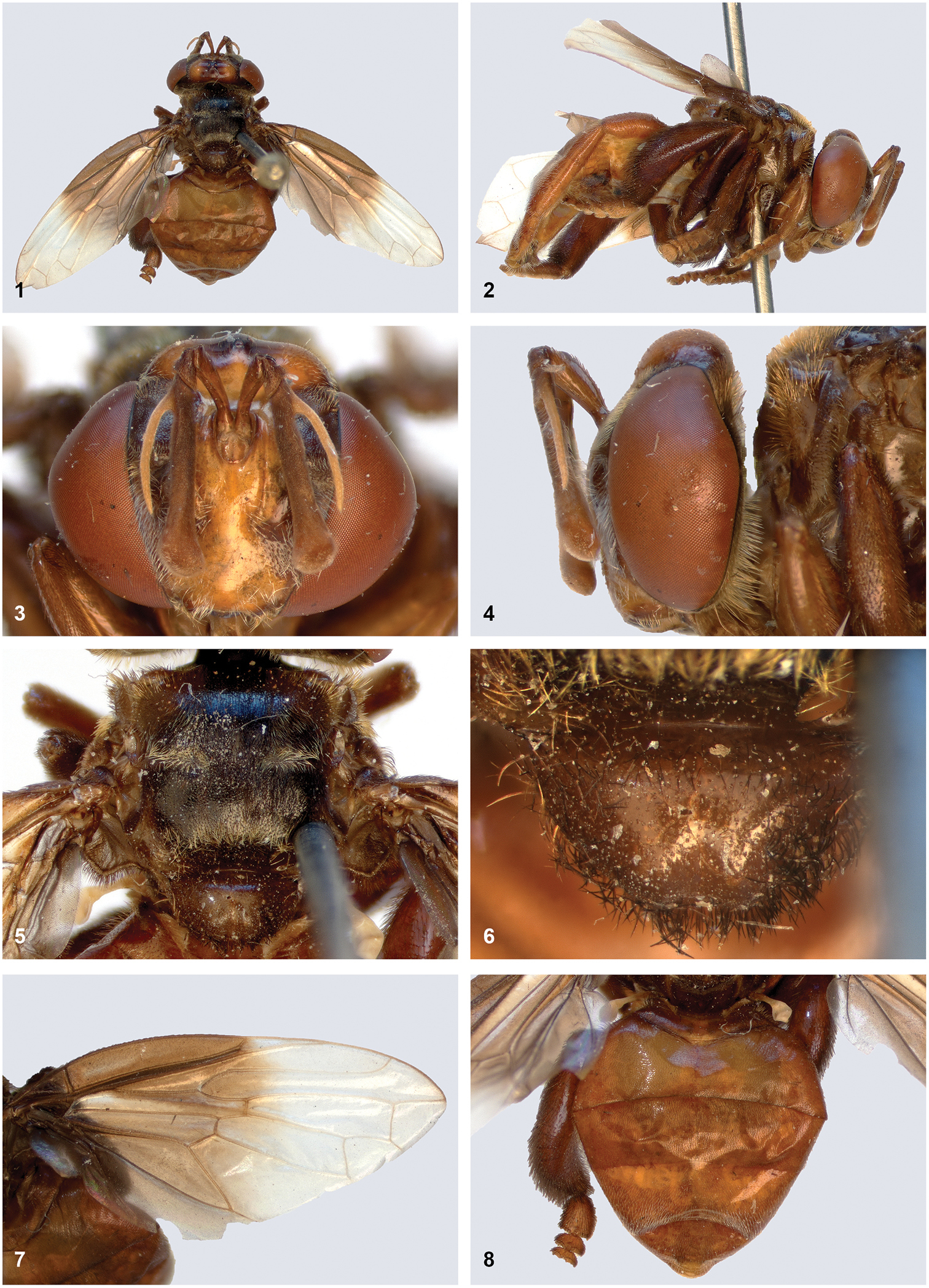
- Furcantenna malayana

Scientific classification
- Kingdom: Animalia
- Phylum: Arthropoda
- Class: Insecta
- Order: Diptera
- Family: Syrphidae
- Subfamily: Microdontinae
- Genus: Furcantenna; Cheng, 2008

Type species
- Furcantenna yangi Cheng, 2008

Species
- F. malayana; F. nepalensis; F. yangi

= Furcantenna =

Genus of flies

Furcantenna is a genus of hoverfly from southwestern China, Nepal and Peninsular Malaysia, containing three species. Furcantenna yangi is only known from males. Furcantenna is similar to the genus Schizoceratomyia. The two genera differ from each other in the shape of the scutellum; in Furcantenna a deep medial sulcus in its posterior margin divides the scutellum into two lobes.

== Species ==
- Furcantenna malayana Reemer, 2020
- Furcantenna nepalensis Reemer, 2013
- Furcantenna yangi Cheng, 2008
