= Syrphipogon =

Scientific classification
- Kingdom: Animalia
- Phylum: Arthropoda
- Clade: Pancrustacea
- Class: Insecta
- Order: Diptera
- Family: Syrphidae
- Genus: Microdon (fly)
- Subgenus: Syrphipogon; Hull, 1937

Type species
- Syrphipogon fucatissimus Hull, 1937

Subgenus of flies

Syrphipogon is a subgenus of the hoverfly genus Microdon. There are two known species. They are very large microdontine flies of about 25 mm. They have a deeply sulcate scutellum and a facial mystax. They are mimics of the large bees of the genus Eulaema.

== Distribution ==
They are native to the Neotropics.

== Species ==
There are two species described in Syrphipogon:

- M. fucatissimus (Hull, 1937)
- M. gaigei Steyskal, 1953
