= Indascia =

Scientific classification
- Kingdom: Animalia
- Phylum: Arthropoda
- Class: Insecta
- Order: Diptera
- Family: Syrphidae
- Subfamily: Microdontinae
- Genus: Indascia; Keiser, 1958

Type species
- Ascia brachystoma Wiedemann, 1924

Genus of flies

Indascia is a genus of hoverflies native to India and Sri Lanka. Indascia is very similar to Paramicrodon.

== Species ==
The four known species are:

- I. brachystoma (Wiedemann, 1924)
- I. gigantica Reemer, 2013
- I. gracilis Keiser, 1958
- I. spathulata Reemer, 2013
