= Parocyptamus =

Scientific classification
- Kingdom: Animalia
- Phylum: Arthropoda
- Class: Insecta
- Order: Diptera
- Family: Syrphidae
- Subfamily: Microdontinae
- Genus: Parocyptamus; Shiraki, 1930

Type species
- Parocyptamus sonamii Shiraki, 1930

Synonyms
- Stenomicrodon Hull, 1937

Genus of flies

Parocyptamus is a genus of hoverflies, with two known species. The critical characteristic is the narrow, elongated abdomen.

== Biology ==
Larvae are found in ant nests.

== Distribution ==
They are native to parts of Asia.

== Species ==
- P. sonamii Shiraki, 1930
- P. stenogaster (Curran, 1931)
