= Microdon lanceolatus =

Scientific classification
- Domain: Eukaryota
- Kingdom: Animalia
- Phylum: Arthropoda
- Class: Insecta
- Order: Diptera
- Family: Syrphidae
- Genus: Microdon
- Species: M. lanceolatus

Binomial name
- Microdon lanceolatus Adams, 1903

Synonyms
- Microdon coloradensis Cockerell and Andrews, 1916; Microdon modestus Knab, 1917; Microdon senilis Knab, 1917; Microdon similis Jones, 1917

Species of fly

Microdon lanceolatus is a species of syrphid fly in the family Syrphidae.
