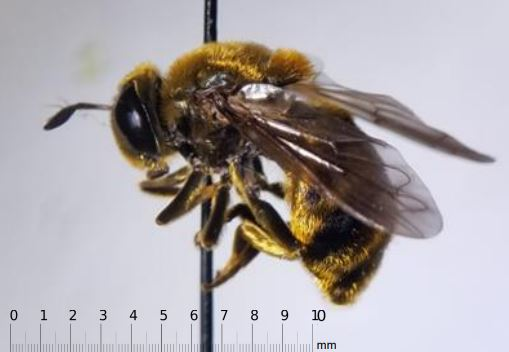

Scientific classification
- Domain: Eukaryota
- Kingdom: Animalia
- Phylum: Arthropoda
- Class: Insecta
- Order: Diptera
- Family: Syrphidae
- Genus: Microdon
- Species: M. aurulentus

Binomial name
- Microdon aurulentus (Fabricius, 1805)

Synonyms
- Mulio aurulentus Fabricius, 1805

= Microdon aurulentus =

Species of fly

Microdon aurulentus is a species of syrphid fly in the family Syrphidae.
