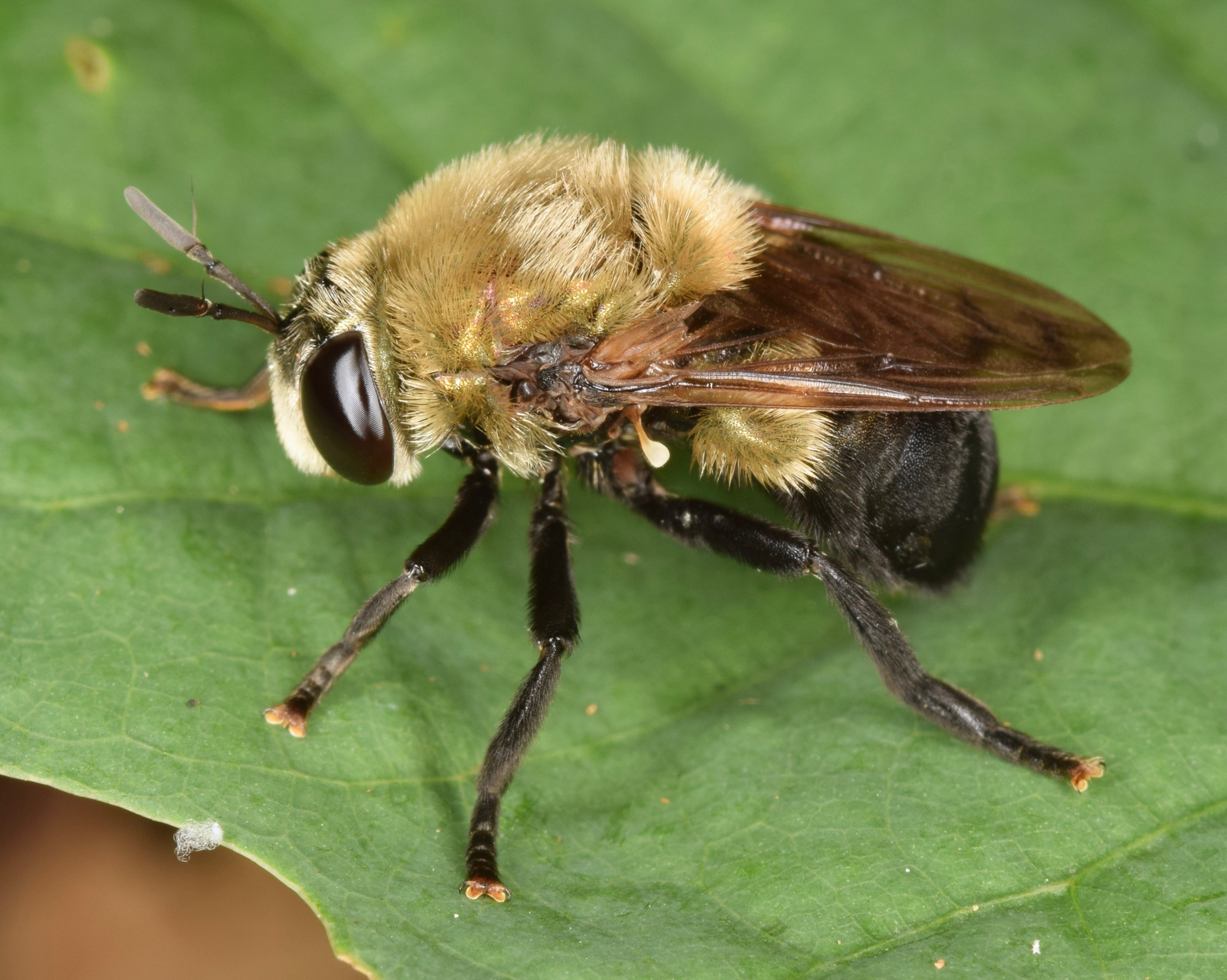
- M. megalogaster

Scientific classification
- Domain: Eukaryota
- Kingdom: Animalia
- Phylum: Arthropoda
- Class: Insecta
- Order: Diptera
- Family: Syrphidae
- Genus: Microdon
- Species: M. megalogaster

Binomial name
- Microdon megalogaster Snow, 1892

Synonyms
- Microdon bombiformis Townsend, 1895

= Microdon megalogaster =

Species of fly

Microdon megalogaster, the black-bodied ant fly, is a species of syrphid fly in the family Syrphidae. It is found in north-eastern North America. The larvae have been found in the nests of Formica subsericea the black field ant, and Formica fusca the silky ant.

== Description ==
Length

12–14 mm (0.47–0.55 in)

Head

The eyes are bare and the front of the face shines metallic greenish, sometimes blackish green. The face is broad below and slightly narrows to above the middle before more strongly narrowing to the lower third of the front, which is marked by an impression. Above this, the front is considerably widened to the posterior angles of the eyes, while in the female the front is only slightly narrowed. In profile, the face is almost straight on the upper third, thence almost evenly convex and retreating to the oral margin. There is a small, squarish, polished, narrowed bare spot above the base of the antennae. On each side of the face, there is an oval, impressed orbital area on the upper fourth that is less distinct in the female. The pile of the head is moderately long and straw yellow. The antennae are black, with the third segment sometimes shining brownish and the first segment usually piceous or reddish except for the apical portion. The first segment of the antennae is almost as long as the remaining two combined, with the second segment about one-fourth as long as the third. The third segment of the antennae has the sides almost parallel, slightly curved upwards apically, the end rounded below, and subpointed above. The arista is reddish and not as long as the third segment.

Thorax

The thorax of this species displays a metallic greenish color with four or six obscure bluish stripes. Its pile is rather long and contains a bright straw yellow hue. The scutellum is of a metallic bluish shade and has each angle broadly rounded, with a slightly excavated apex. Very small tubercles are present on the scutellum, which due to the dense pile may be difficult to notice. The pile on the scutellum is usually straw yellow but can appear more yellowish at times.

Abdomen

The area beyond the second abdominal segment is black and covered with hairs. Additionally, in females, the fourth abdominal segment is significantly shorter at the midpoint yet almost twice as long as the third. The fourth and fifth abdominal segments are demarcated by depressions in males. In females, the fifth abdominal segment features sublateral depressions that extend to the posterior angles.

Wings

The wings are usually slightly brownish tinged, the cross-veins more or less clouded and luteous; the last section of the fourth vein is strongly recurrent, joining the third slightly before the tip of the second; the last section of the fifth vein is bulbous posteriorly, joining the fourth at a right angle. The first posterior cell is broadened beyond the junction of the fourth and fifth veins; the stump of vein into the first posterior cell is directed obliquely backwards and does not quite reach the spurious vein.

Legs

The legs are entirely blackish with black pile. The tarsi appear greyish yellow pollinose: broad, flattened. The hind tarsi have a rusty reddish pubescence beneath. In the female the inner side of the front tibiae at the apex has distinct reddish or tawny pubescence. The pubescence beneath all the tarsi are more tawny.
