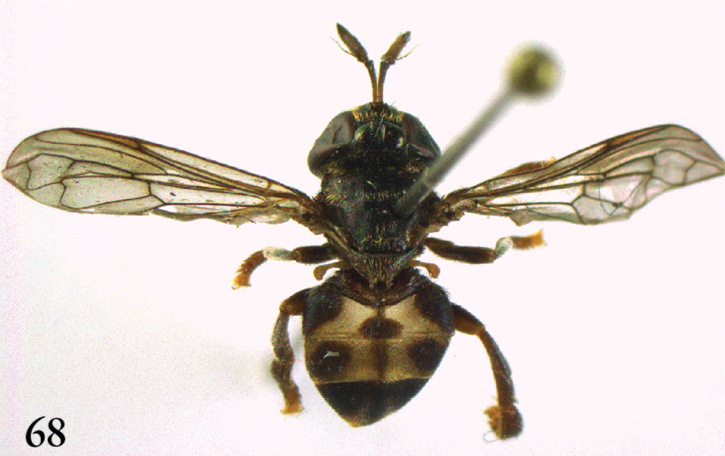
- Holotype of Domodon zodiacus

Scientific classification
- Kingdom: Animalia
- Phylum: Arthropoda
- Class: Insecta
- Order: Diptera
- Family: Syrphidae
- Subfamily: Microdontinae
- Genus: Domodon; Reemer, 2013

Type species
- Domodon zodiacus Reemer, 2013

= Domodon =

Genus of flies

Domodon is a genus of hoverfly from South America and Central America containing five species.

== Species ==
- D. caxiuana Carvalho-Filho, Martins, Souza & Reemer, 2019 – Brazil, Ecuador, French Guiana
- D. inaculeatus Carvalho-Filho, Martins, Souza & Reemer, 2019 – Brazil, French Guiana
- D. peperpotensis Reemer, 2014 – Suriname, French Guiana
- D. sensibilis Carvalho-Filho, Martins, Souza & Reemer, 2019 – Costa Rica
- D. zodiacus Reemer, 2013 – Suriname
