= Microdon tristis =

Scientific classification
- Kingdom: Animalia
- Phylum: Arthropoda
- Class: Insecta
- Order: Diptera
- Family: Syrphidae
- Genus: Microdon
- Species: M. tristis

Binomial name
- Microdon tristis Loew, 1864

Synonyms
- Microdon robusta Telford, 1939

Species of fly

Microdon tristis is a species of syrphid fly in the family Syrphidae.

== Description ==
For terminology Speight key to genera and glossary

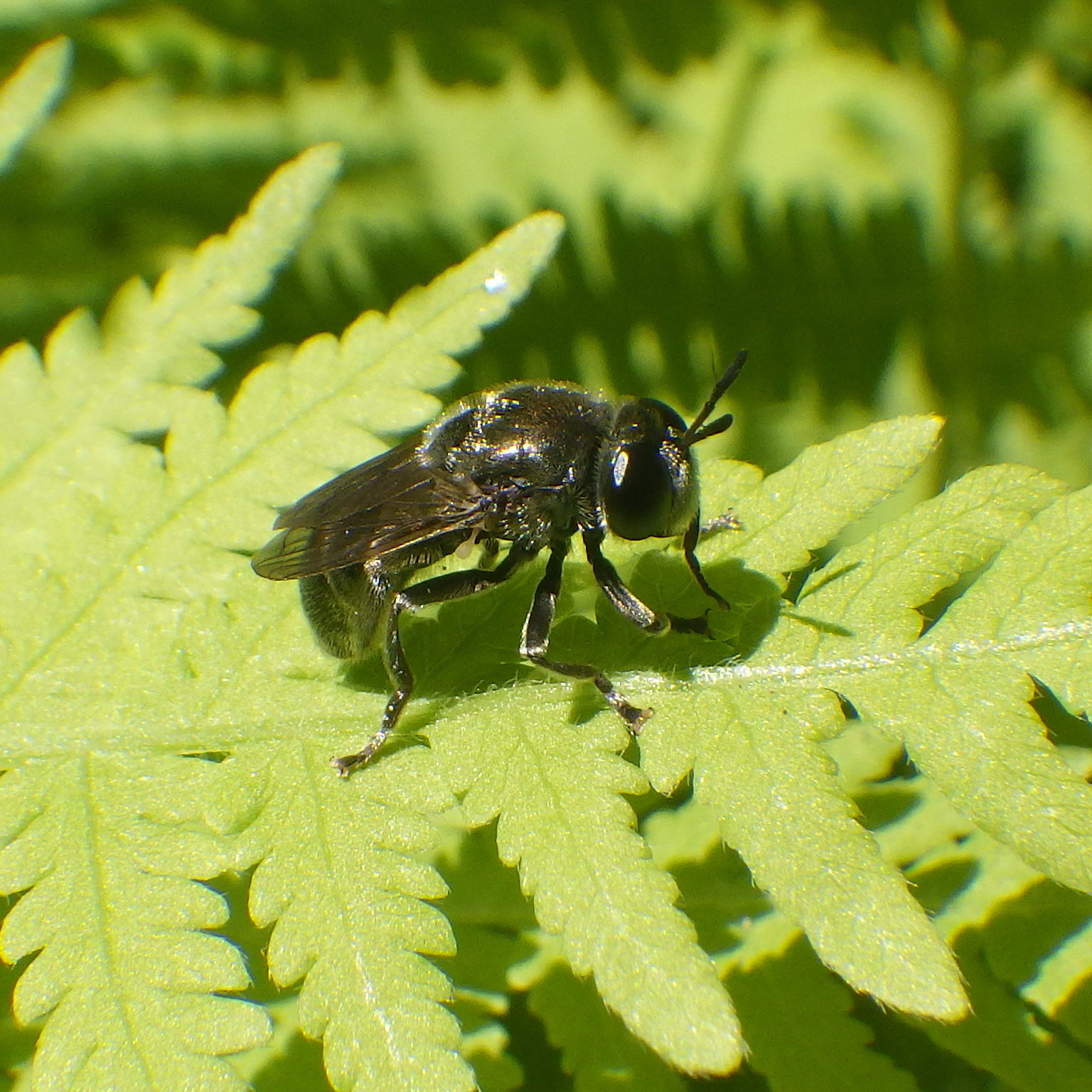
Microdon tristis

external link gbif
external image

=== Head ===
Face and frons

Bronze black, unusually flat and broadened below, not convex above, but convex-retreating below.
Facial depressions are narrow and gray pollinose.
The pile is pale brassy yellow.
There is a nearly triangular polished area above antennae that shines steel blue.
The transverse depression is deep and narrow.
Frons is moderately constricted below.
The posterior ocelli distant.

The ocellar triangle is long, extends nearly to transverse depression and is connected with the vertical bump.

Vertical bump is usually rather large and transversely covered with tiny, granular bumps and ridges, with a greenish reflection

The occiput is greenish black, with pale pile that is more concentrated along the eyes.
The antennae are black.

The first segment, the scape, is more or less reddish basally.
third segment, the flagellum, is longer than the first, widest at basal third, beyond which it curves slightly upwards and narrows to a moderately narrow blunt tip.

Female face.

Face about equal in width throughout.
Frons a little narrowed.
Facial side depressions wider and joined to broader, more triangular.
Very densely punctured depressions on either side of lower half of frons.
Polished area above antennae of females larger than males.
Vertical bump of female is a little larger.

=== The thorax ===
bronzed or purplish.
Scutum.

four to six longitudinal greenish stripes present, sometimes indistinct.
The pile is brassy yellowish

Scutellum

Purplish bronzed, somewhat concave, with a stout, bare spur on either side of the concavity.

female.

Pile of the thorax and scutellum is more yellow-brassy.

=== Abdomen ===
The color and texture of the abdomen

Dull black with glossy brownish black, reddish or luteous sides and apex
Densely and coarsely punctured, except along margin and apex

The segments size and color

Second segment has greenish reflection with shallow depression inside anterior angles
Third segment almost 1.75 times longer than second, slightly depressed basally and inside posterior angles
Fourth segment longer than first three combined, with lateral depressions and less densely punctured laterally and apically.
V-shaped depression of the fourth segment is usually indistinct or entirely wanting.

The pile

Brassy yellow on first two segments
Light-colored pile on lateral and posterior margin of third segment and on posterior two-thirds of fourth segment
Shorter and black pile elsewhere
Light-colored pile may sometimes extend entirely across posterior margin of fourth segment

Description of the female abdomen

Female pile on sides of abdomen golden brassy
Fourth and fifth segments are of about equal length
Black pilose areas on base of fourth segment, emitting a broad median and narrow lateral black pilose areas

=== Wings ===
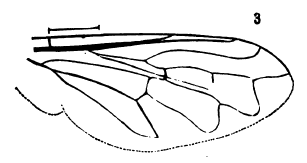
Microdon_tristis_wing

The first posterior ceil (r4+5) has a stump of a vein from the third longitudinal vein ( R4+5).
This stump of vein is at or slightly beyond the middle of the first posterior cell in the male, but before the middle in the female.
The wings are lightly infuscated, and darker along the veins.
The apical crossvein (M1), is recurrent and joining the third longitudinal ( R4+5) vein before the tip of the second vein..
The squamae is tinged with yellow, the border and fringe of the same color.
Halteres pale yellow.

=== Legs ===
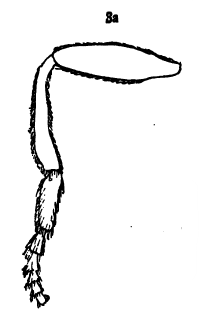
hind leg

Mainly blackish.
Coxae, trochanters, and bases of femora are reddish.
The tibiae are usually reddish or sometimes just reddish basally and apically.
The tarsi are similar in color but highly variable.
Pile

Mostly whitish yellow.
More golden under the tarsi.
The inside of the front tibiae is golden dorsally.

key to adults and pupae north of Mexico. includes head drawing of M. tristis
