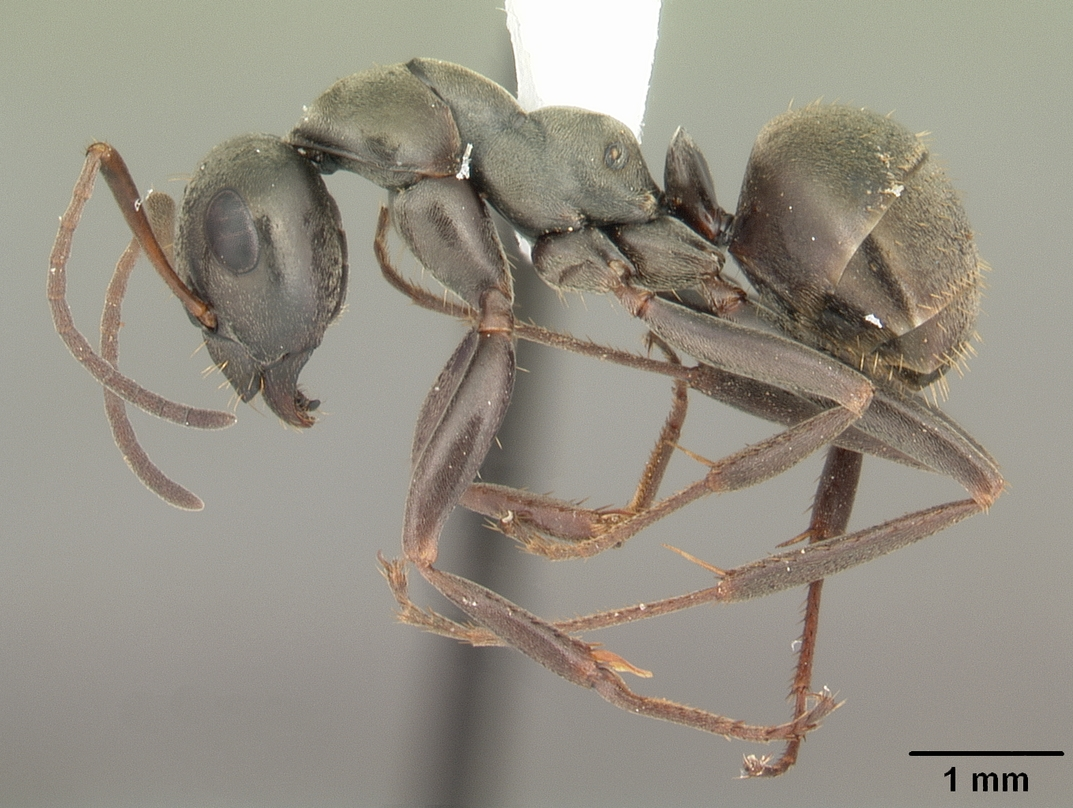
- Formica subsericea worker

Scientific classification
- Domain: Eukaryota
- Kingdom: Animalia
- Phylum: Arthropoda
- Class: Insecta
- Order: Hymenoptera
- Family: Formicidae
- Subfamily: Formicinae
- Genus: Formica
- Species: F. subsericea

Binomial name
- Formica subsericea Say, 1836

= Formica subsericea =

Species of ant

Formica subsericea, colloquially known as the black field ant, is a species of ant in the genus Formica. It is found in the eastern United States and Canada. Workers of this species are incredibly fast and quite timid. Workers of this species are commonly found working as slaves in Polyergus colonies. Nuptial flights typically occur in July or August. It is often confused with another Formica species, Formica fusca. The larvae of Microdon megalogaster, a member of the ant fly genus, have been observed in the nests of these ants. The inquiline relationship of these fly larvae is not well understood.
