= Mixogaster breviventris =

Scientific classification
- Kingdom: Animalia
- Phylum: Arthropoda
- Clade: Pancrustacea
- Class: Insecta
- Order: Diptera
- Family: Syrphidae
- Genus: Mixogaster
- Species: M. breviventris

Binomial name
- Mixogaster breviventris Kahl, 1897

Species of fly

241–242 Mixogaster breviventris male (USA, coll. RMNH): 241 habitus dorsal 242 wing

Mixogaster breviventris is a species of syrphid fly in the family Syrphidae.
