= Megodon =

Scientific classification
- Kingdom: Animalia
- Phylum: Arthropoda
- Clade: Pancrustacea
- Class: Insecta
- Order: Diptera
- Family: Syrphidae
- Subfamily: Microdontinae
- Genus: Microdon (fly)
- Subgenus: Megodon; Keiser, 1971

Type species
- Megodon stuckenbergi Keiser, 1971

Subgenus of flies

Megodon is a subgenus of the hoverfly genus Microdon. It is native to Madagascar, and contains only two known species. Microdon stuckenbergi has an unusual scutellum. Larvae are found in ant nests.

== Species ==
There are 2 species described in Megodon:

- M. planitarsus Keiser, 1971
- M. stuckenbergi (Keiser, 1971)
