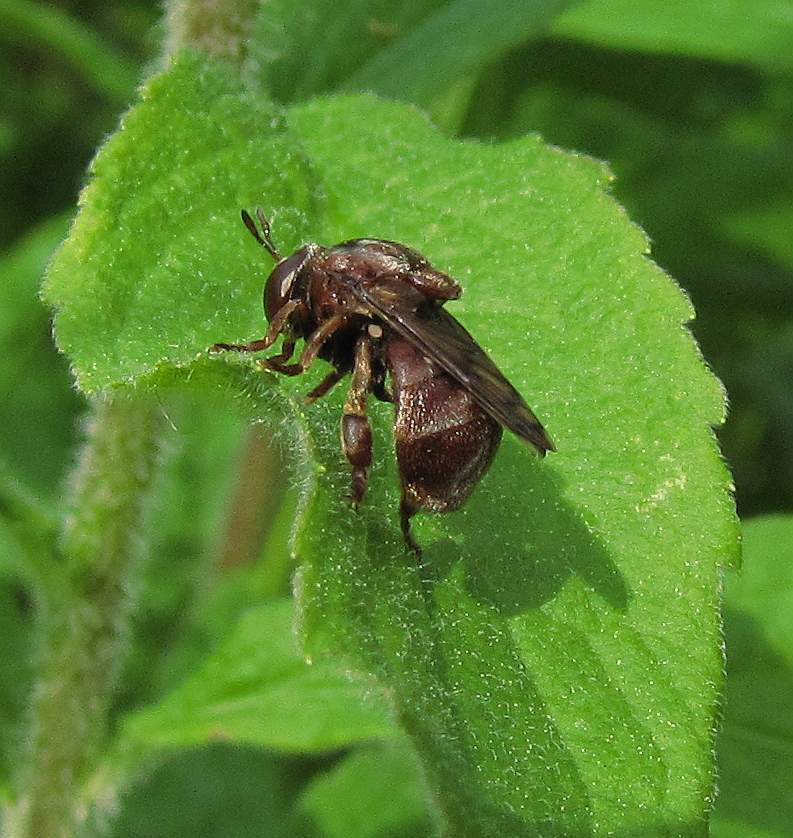
- M. abditus

Scientific classification
- Domain: Eukaryota
- Kingdom: Animalia
- Phylum: Arthropoda
- Class: Insecta
- Order: Diptera
- Family: Syrphidae
- Genus: Microdon
- Species: M. abditus

Binomial name
- Microdon abditus Thompson, 1981

= Microdon abditus =

Species of fly

Microdon abditus the Broad-footed Ant Fly is a species of syrphid fly in the family Syrphidae.
