= Microdon craigheadii =

Scientific classification
- Kingdom: Animalia
- Phylum: Arthropoda
- Class: Insecta
- Order: Diptera
- Family: Syrphidae
- Genus: Microdon
- Species: M. craigheadii

Binomial name
- Microdon craigheadii Walton, 1912

Species of fly

Microdon craigheadii is a species of syrphid fly in the family Syrphidae.
