= Masarygus =

Scientific classification
- Kingdom: Animalia
- Phylum: Arthropoda
- Class: Insecta
- Order: Diptera
- Family: Syrphidae
- Subfamily: Microdontinae
- Genus: Masarygus; Bréthes, 1909

Type species
- Masarygus palmipalpus Bréthes, 1909

Synonyms
- Masarygidae

Genus of flies

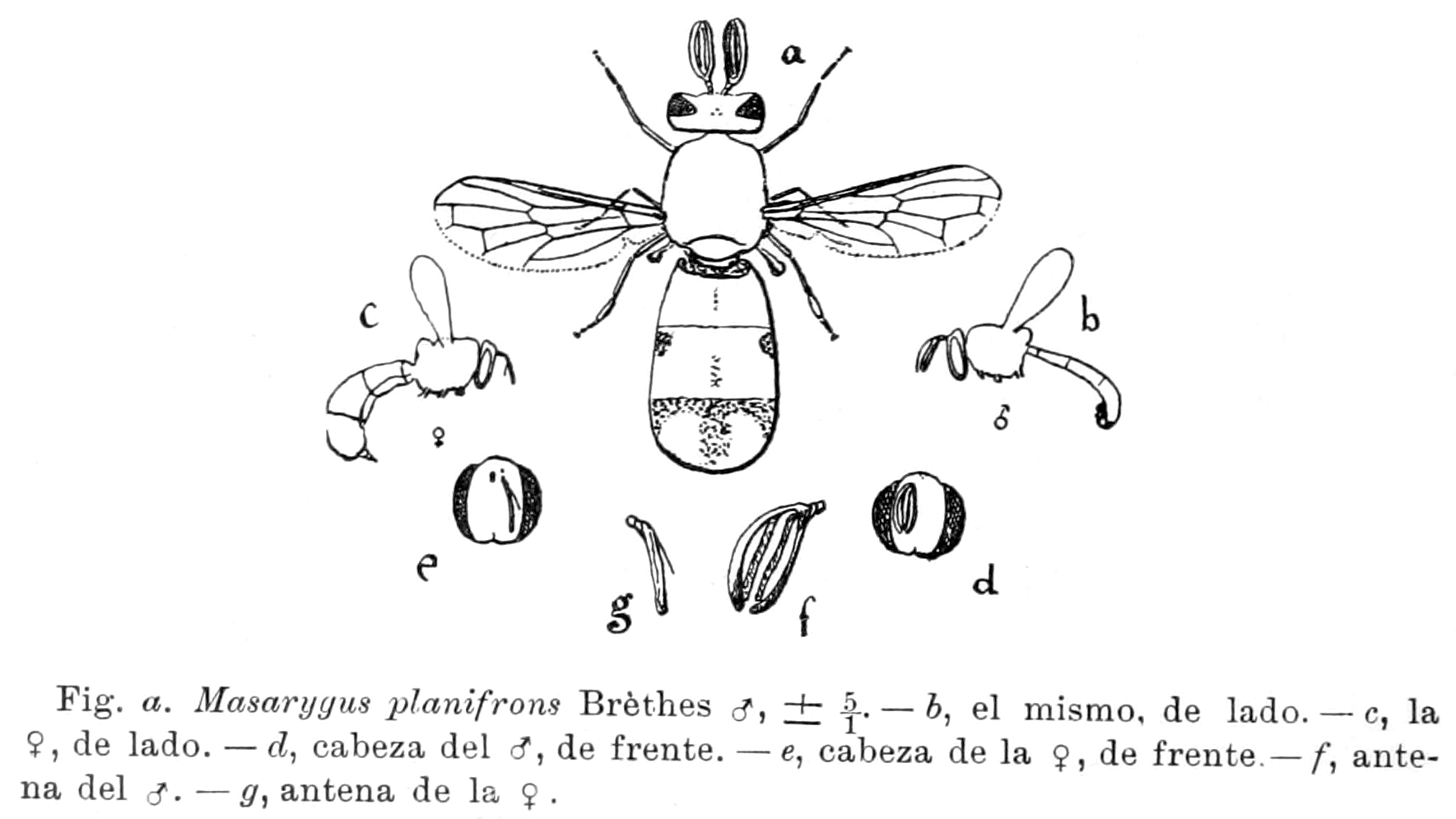
Masarygus planifrons

Masarygus is a genus of hoverflies native to Argentina, containing two species. It was first described as representing a new family related to Conopidae or possibly the Oestridae due to its much reduced mouthparts. Larvae are found in ant nests.

== Species ==
- M. palmipalpus Reemer, 2013
- M. planifrons Bréthes, 1909
