= Microdon globosus =

Scientific classification
- Domain: Eukaryota
- Kingdom: Animalia
- Phylum: Arthropoda
- Class: Insecta
- Order: Diptera
- Family: Syrphidae
- Genus: Microdon
- Species: M. globosus

Binomial name
- Microdon globosus (Fabricius, 1805)

Synonyms
- Dimeraspis podagra Newman, 1838; Microdon albipilis Curran, 1925; Microdon conflictus Curran, 1925; Microdon hutchingsi Curran, 1927; Microdon pseudoglobsus Curran, 1925; Mulio globosus Fabricius, 1805

Species of fly

Microdon globosus is a species of syrphid fly in the family Syrphidae.
