= Myiacerapis =

Scientific classification
- Kingdom: Animalia
- Phylum: Arthropoda
- Clade: Pancrustacea
- Class: Insecta
- Order: Diptera
- Family: Syrphidae
- Genus: Microdon (fly)
- Subgenus: Myiacerapis; Hull, 1949
- Species: M. villosus

Binomial name
- Microdon villosus Bezzi, 1915

Subgenus of flies

Myiacerapis is a subgenus of the hoverfly genus Microdon. It contains only one species, Microdon villosus. It is native to Uganda, though an undescribed species is known from South Africa. Larvae are found in ant nests.
