= Omegasyrphus coarctatus =

Scientific classification
- Kingdom: Animalia
- Phylum: Arthropoda
- Class: Insecta
- Order: Diptera
- Family: Syrphidae
- Genus: Omegasyrphus
- Species: O. coarctatus

Binomial name
- Omegasyrphus coarctatus (Loew, 1864)

Synonyms
- Microdon coarctatus Loew, 1864

Species of insect

Omegasyrphus coarctatus, the orange-legged ant fly, is a rare species of syrphid fly observed across the United States. Hoverflies can remain nearly motionless in flight. The adults are also known as flower flies for they are commonly found on flowers except Microdon species are seldom observed around flowers. Larvae have been found in the nests of the ant species Monomorium minutum and Aphaenogaster fulva
