= Bardistopus =

Scientific classification
- Kingdom: Animalia
- Phylum: Arthropoda
- Class: Insecta
- Order: Diptera
- Family: Syrphidae
- Subfamily: Microdontinae
- Genus: Bardistopus; Mann, 1920
- Species: B. papuanum

Binomial name
- Bardistopus papuanum Mann, 1920

Genus of flies

Bardistopus is a genus of hoverflies containing one species, Bardistopus papuanum. The original description erroneously stated the species was based on two female specimens; they are in fact both males.

== Biology ==
Larvae are found in ant nests.

== Distribution ==
B. papuanum is endemic to the Solomon Islands.
