= Aristosyrphus =

Scientific classification
- Kingdom: Animalia
- Phylum: Arthropoda
- Class: Insecta
- Order: Diptera
- Family: Syrphidae
- Subfamily: Microdontinae
- Genus: Aristosyrphus; Curran, 1941

Type species
- Aristosyrphus primus Curran, 1941

Synonyms
- Paraceratophya Fluke, 1957; Protoceratophya Hull, 1949

Genus of flies

Aristosyrphus is a genus of Neotropical hoverflies.

== Species ==
The genus contains 15 species, divided into two subgenera Aristosyrphus and Eurypterosyrphus Barretto & Lane, 1947:

=== Subgenus Aristosyrphus ===
- A. barrettoi Thompson, 2008 – Brazil (Goias)
- A. bellus Marinoni, 2008 – Brazil (Amazonas)
- A. boraceiensis (Papavero, 1962)
- A. brunneus Thompson, 2008 – Costa Rica & Brazil (São Paulo)
- A. carpenteri (Hull, 1945)
- A. elegans Thompson, 2008 – Brazil (Roraima)
- A. elongatus Hull, 1943
- A. fortuitus Ramirez, 2008 – Mexico (Jalisco)
- A. minutus Thompson, 2004
- A. obscurus Thompson, 2008 – Brazil (Santa Catarina)
- A. primus Curran, 1941
- A. samperi Thompson, 2008 – Colombia, Peru & Costa Rica

=== Subgenus Eurypterosyrphus ===
- A. currani (Goot, 1964)
- A. macropterus (Curran, 1941)
- A. melanopterus Barretto & Lane, 1947
