= Ptilobactrum =

Scientific classification
- Kingdom: Animalia
- Phylum: Arthropoda
- Clade: Pancrustacea
- Class: Insecta
- Order: Diptera
- Family: Syrphidae
- Subfamily: Microdontinae
- Genus: Ptilobactrum; Bezzi, 1915
- Species: P. neavei

Binomial name
- Ptilobactrum neavei Bezzi, 1915

Genus of flies

Ptilobactrum is a genus of hoverflies, with one known species, Ptilobactrum neavei. They have very broad heads and their basoflagellomeres are elongate and densely pilose in males.

== Biology ==
Larvae are found in ant nests.

== Distribution ==
P. neavei is native to the African tropics.
