= Mixogaster =

Scientific classification
- Kingdom: Animalia
- Phylum: Arthropoda
- Class: Insecta
- Order: Diptera
- Family: Syrphidae
- Subfamily: Microdontinae
- Genus: Mixogaster; Macquart, 1842

Type species
- Mixogaster conopsoides Macquart, 1842

Synonyms
- Myxogaster Kertész, 1910; Myxogaster Shiraki, 1930

Genus of flies

Mixogaster is a genus of hoverflies native to North America and South America, with 21 known species. Mixogaster is distinct by lacking an appendix on vein R4+5, having a reduced and bare metasternum, an unarmed scutellum, and usually an appendix on vein M extending in cell R4+5. Larvae are found in ant nests.

== Species ==
- M. anthermus (Walker, 1849)
- M. breviventris Kahl, 1897
- M. cicatrix Hull, 1954
- M. conopsoides Macquart, 1842
- M. cubensis Curran, 1932
- M. currani Hull, 1954
- M. delongi Johnston, 1924
- M. dimidiata Giglio-Tos, 1892
- Mixogaster fattigi (Skevington & Locke, 2019)
- M. flukei Hull, 4[3]
- M. imitator Thompson, 2004
- M. johnsoni Hull, 1941
- M. lanei Carrera & Lenko, 1958
- M. lopesi Carrera & Lenko, 1958
- M. mexicana Macquart, 1846
- M. orpheus Hull, 1944
- M. pithecofascia Hull, 1944
- M. polistes Hull, 4[3]
- M. rarior Shannon, 1925
- M. sartocrypta Hull, 4[3]
- M. strictor Hull, 1941
- M. thecla Hull, 1954
