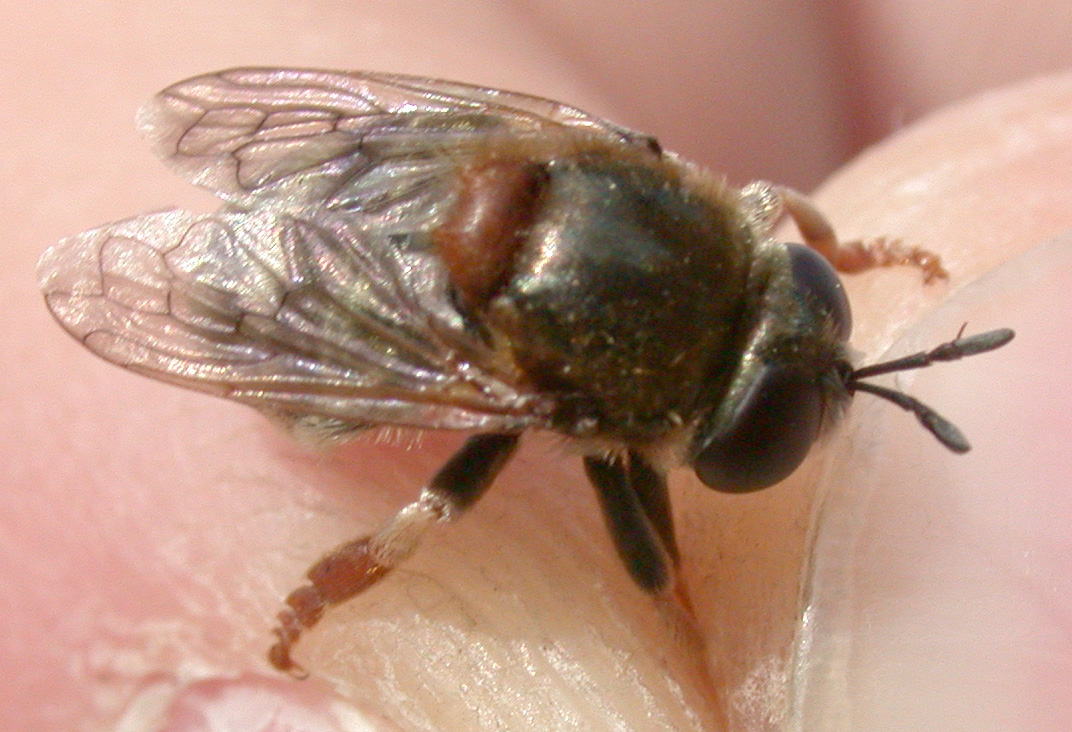
- Microdon mutabilis

Scientific classification
- Kingdom: Animalia
- Phylum: Arthropoda
- Clade: Pancrustacea
- Class: Insecta
- Order: Diptera
- Family: Syrphidae
- Subfamily: Microdontinae; Rondani, 1845

= Microdontinae =

Subfamily of flies

The subfamily Microdontinae contains slightly more than 400 species of hoverflies (family Syrphidae) and, while diverse, these species share several characteristics by which they differ from other syrphids. The Microdontinae are myrmecophiles, meaning they live in the nests of ants. Larval Microdontinae are scavengers or predators in ant nests, and, in contrast to other syrphid larvae, have no readily apparent body segmentation. Some species also do not exhibit the typical adult flower-visiting behaviour of other hoverflies, but instead remain near their larval host colonies (some of these species have no functional mouthparts and cannot feed as adults).

A number of genera (e.g. Masarygus, Paragodon, Schizoceratomyia and Surimyia) lack the "spurious vein" which is characteristic of all other Syrphidae. For other distinguishing characteristics, see Thompson (1969).

== Genera ==
A revised list of the genera in Microdontinae was carried out by Reemer & Ståhls (2013):

- Afromicrodon Thompson, 2008
- Archimicrodon Hull, 1945
  - Archimicrodon Hull, 1945
  - Hovamicrodon Keiser, 1971
- Aristosyrphus Curran, 1941
  - Aristosyrphus Curran, 1941
  - Eurypterosyrphus Barretto & Lane, 1947
- Bardistopus Mann, 1920
- Carreramyia Doesburg, 1966
- Ceratophya Wiedemann, 1824
- Ceratrichomyia Séguy, 1951
- Ceriomicrodon Hull, 1937
- Cervicorniphora Hull, 1945
- Chrysidimyia Hull, 1937
- Domodon Reemer, 2013
- Furcantenna Cheng, 2008
- Heliodon Reemer, 2013
- Hypselosyrphus Hull, 1937
- Indascia Keiser, 1958
- Kryptopyga Hull, 1944
- Laetodon Reemer, 2013
- Masarygus Bréthes, 1909
- Menidon Reemer, 2013
- Mermerizon Reemer, 2013
- Metadon Reemer, 2013
- Microdon Meigen, 1803
  - Chymophila Macquart, 1834
  - Dimeraspis Newman, 1838
  - Megodon Keiser, 1971
  - Microdon Meigen, 1803
  - Myiacerapis Hull, 1949
  - Syrphipogon Hull, 1937
- Mixogaster Macquart, 1842
- Oligeriops Hull, 1937
- Omegasyrphus Giglio-Tos, 1891
- Paragodon Thompson, 1969
- Paramicrodon de Meijere, 1913
- Paramixogaster Brunetti, 1923
- Parocyptamus Shiraki, 1930
- Peradon Reemer, 2013
- Piruwa Reemer, 2013
- Pseudomicrodon Hull, 1937
- Ptilobactrum Bezzi, 1915
- Rhoga Walker, 1857
- Rhopalosyrphus Giglio-Tos, 1891
- Schizoceratomyia Carrera, Lopes & Lane, 1947
- Serichlamys Curran, 1925
- Spheginobaccha de Meijere, 1908
- Stipomorpha Hull, 1945
- Sulcodon Reemer, 2013
- Surimyia Reemer, 2008
- Thompsodon Reemer, 2013
- Ubristes Walker, 1852
