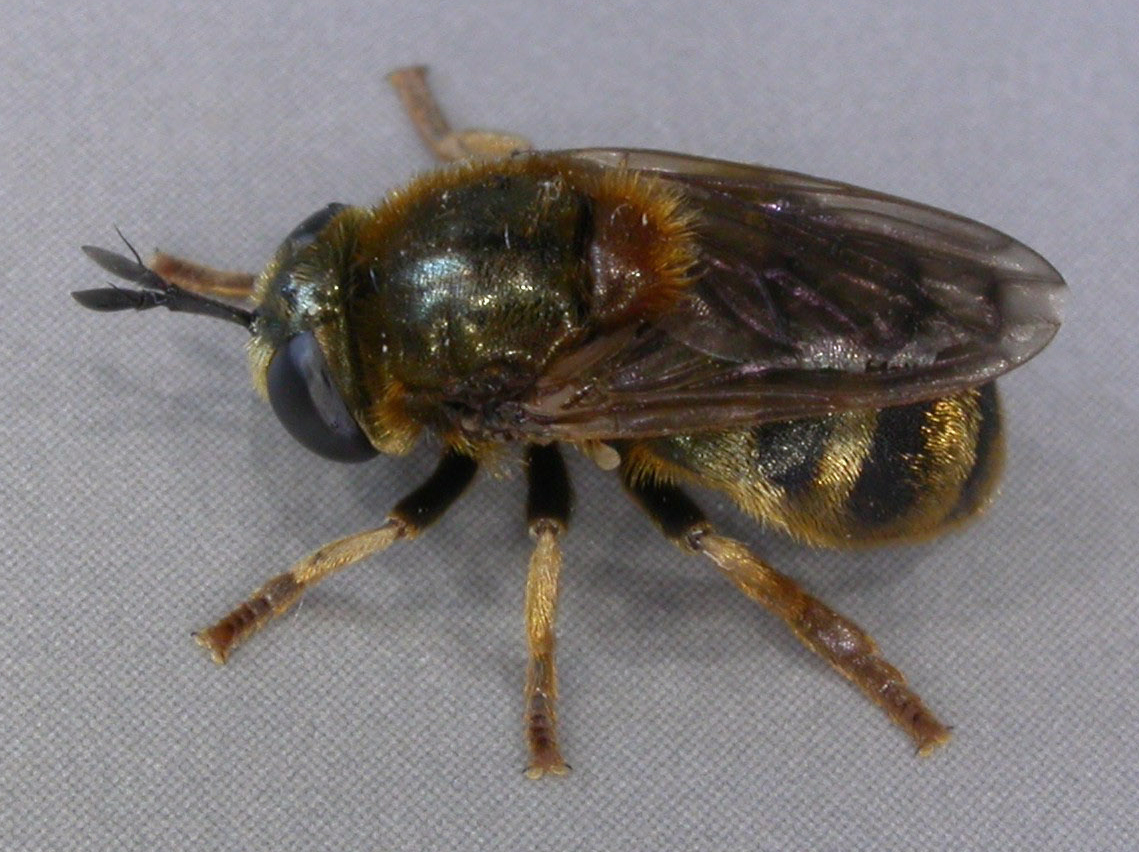
- Microdon myrmicae Trawscoed, Wales

Scientific classification
- Kingdom: Animalia
- Phylum: Arthropoda
- Clade: Pancrustacea
- Class: Insecta
- Order: Diptera
- Family: Syrphidae
- Genus: Microdon
- Species: M. myrmicae

Binomial name
- Microdon myrmicae Schonrogge, Barr, Wardlaw, Napper, Gardner, Breen, Elmes & Thoma 2002

= Microdon myrmicae =

Species of fly

Microdon myrmicae is a species of hoverfly belonging to the family Syrphidae.

It is a Palearctic species with a limited distribution in Europe (Ireland, Great Britain, the Netherlands, Germany, France, Norway, Poland and European Russia (Karelia).

M. myrmicae is a parasite on Myrmica scabrinodis, M. gallieni and M.tulinae (Formicidae).

Microdon myrmicae lives sympatrically with other myrmecophiles including Phengaris alcon, P. nausithous and P. teleius (in one location all four species cooccur).

== Description ==
External images For terms see Morphology of Diptera
Wing length 6·75-8·25 mm. See references for determination At present M.mutabilis is only reliably distinguished from M.myrmicae by features of the puparium.

Two color morphs of the species are known: individuals of either sex can be predominantly gold-haired or silver-haired. However, more males appear to be silver than gold, and the reverse is true for females, suggesting a complex genetic mechanism.
