= Surimyia =

Scientific classification
- Kingdom: Animalia
- Phylum: Arthropoda
- Class: Insecta
- Order: Diptera
- Family: Syrphidae
- Subfamily: Microdontinae
- Genus: Surimyia; Reemer, 2008

Type species
- Surimyia rolanderi Reemer, 2008

Genus of flies

Surimyia is a genus of hoverflies, with three known species. They are small (4– to 5-mm) microdontine flies. Surimyia is the only hoverfly genus with the katatergum lacking microtrichia. In the subfamily Microdontinae, they are distinctive in the absence of pilosity on the postpronotum.

== Biology ==
Larvae are presumably found in ant nests.

== Distribution ==
They are only known from Suriname.

== Species ==
- S. minutula (van Doesburg, 1966)
- S. reemeri Carvalho-Filho, 2014
- S. rolanderi Reemer, 2008
