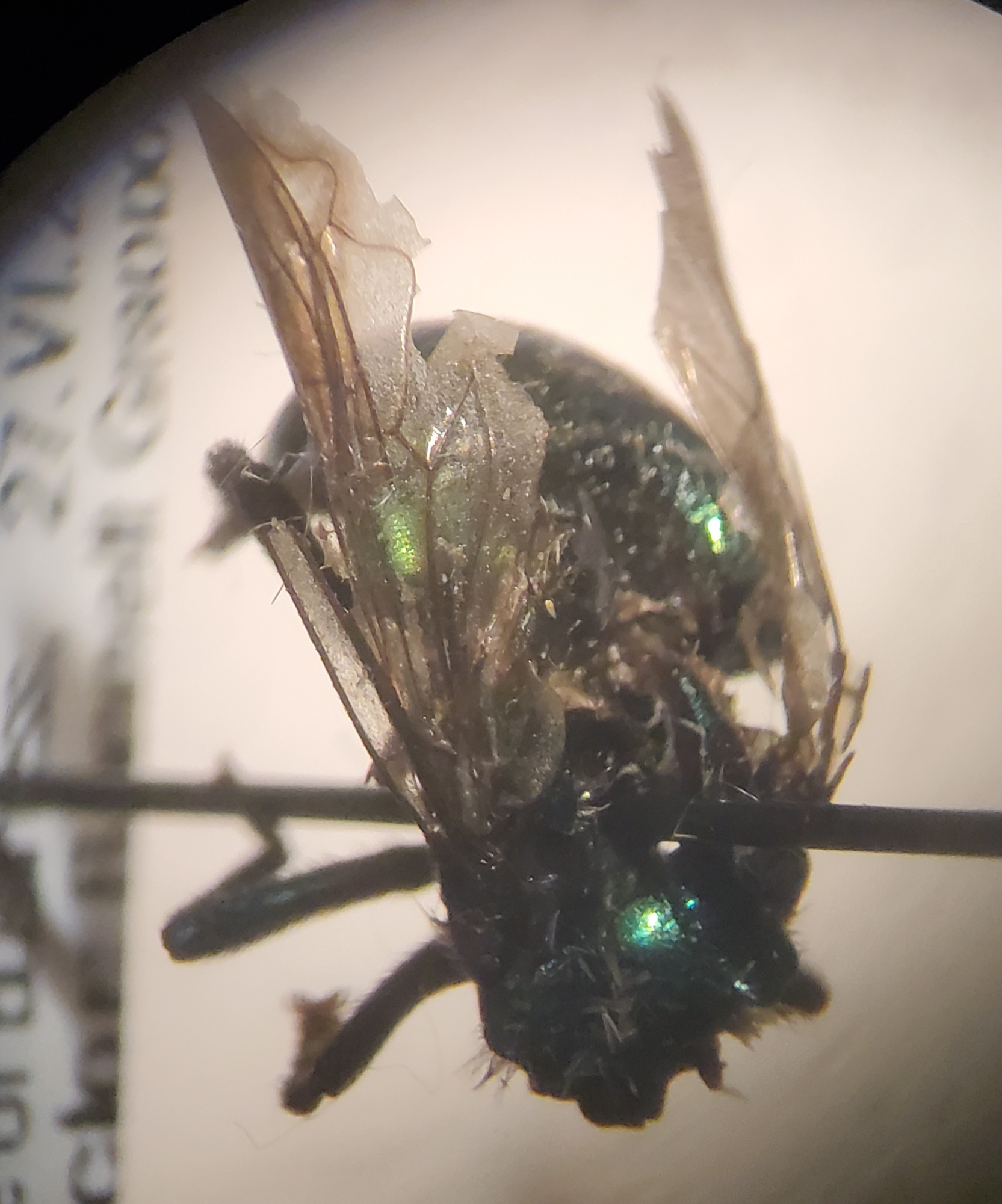

Scientific classification
- Kingdom: Animalia
- Phylum: Arthropoda
- Clade: Pancrustacea
- Class: Insecta
- Order: Diptera
- Family: Syrphidae
- Genus: Microdon
- Species: M. fulgens

Binomial name
- Microdon fulgens Wiedemann, 1830

Synonyms
- Chymophila englossoides Gray, 1832; Chymophila splendens Macquart, 1834

= Microdon fulgens =

Species of fly

Microdon fulgens is a species of syrphid fly in the family Syrphidae.
