= Schizoceratomyia =

Scientific classification
- Kingdom: Animalia
- Phylum: Arthropoda
- Class: Insecta
- Order: Diptera
- Family: Syrphidae
- Subfamily: Microdontinae
- Genus: Schizoceratomyia; Carrera, Lopes & Lane, 1947

Type species
- Schizoceratomyia barretoi Carrera, Lopes & Lane, 1947

Synonyms
- Johnsoniodon Curran, 1947

Genus of flies

Schizoceratomyia is a genus of hoverflies, with four known species. Larvae are found in ant nests. They are native to the Neotropics.

== Species ==
- S. barretoi Carrera, Lopes & Lane, 1947
- S. carrerai (Papavero, 1962)
- S. flavipes Carrera, Lopes & Lane, 1947
- S. malleri (Curran, 1947)
