= Rhopalosyrphus =

Scientific classification
- Kingdom: Animalia
- Phylum: Arthropoda
- Class: Insecta
- Order: Diptera
- Family: Syrphidae
- Subfamily: Microdontinae
- Genus: Rhopalosyrphus; Giglio-Tos, 1891

Type species
- Holmbergia guentherii Lynch Arribálzaga, 1891

Synonyms
- Holmbergia Lynch Arribalzaga, 1891

Genus of flies

Rhopalosyrphus is a genus of hoverflies, with nine known species. The adults flies mimic wasps, such as Zethus. The larvae are predators of ant brood. They are native to from southern United States to northern Argentina.

== Species ==
=== Sensu stricto ===
- Rhopalosyrphus australis Thompson, 2003
- Rhopalosyrphus ecuadoriensis Reemer, 2013
- Rhopalosyrphus guentherii (Lynch Arribálzaga, 1891) (= R. carolae Capelle, 1956)
- Rhopalosyrphus ramulorum Weems & Deyrup, 2003
- Rhopalosyrphus robustus Reemer, 2013

=== Sensu lato ===
- Rhopalosyrphus abnormis (Curran, 1925)
- Rhopalosyrphus abnormoides Reemer, 2013
- Rhopalosyrphus cerioides (Hull, 1943)
- Rhopalosyrphus oreokawensis Reemer, 2013
