= Cervicorniphora =

Scientific classification
- Kingdom: Animalia
- Phylum: Arthropoda
- Clade: Pancrustacea
- Class: Insecta
- Order: Diptera
- Family: Syrphidae
- Genus: Cervicorniphora
- Species: C. alcicornis

Binomial name
- Cervicorniphora alcicornis (Ferguson, 1926)

Synonyms
- Microdon alcicornis Ferguson, 1926

Species of fly

Cervicorniphora alcicornis is a species of Australian hoverfly, and the only species in the genus Cervicorniphora.
