= Hypselosyrphus =

Scientific classification
- Kingdom: Animalia
- Phylum: Arthropoda
- Clade: Pancrustacea
- Class: Insecta
- Order: Diptera
- Family: Syrphidae
- Subfamily: Microdontinae
- Tribe: Microdontini
- Genus: Hypselosyrphus; Hull, 1937

Genus of hoverflies

Hypselosyrphus is a genus of hoverflies (Syrphidae). The genus is one of several Microdontinae that mimic stingless bees, with a brush-like pilosity on the hind-tibia, superficially resembling the corbicula of Meliponini. Restricted to the Neotropical region, the species in genus are recorded for Panama, Brazil (Southern and Amazon region), probably widespread throughout tropical South America.

== Morphology ==
With a body length of 7-10 mm, the genus can be differenciated from other Microdontinae stingless bee mimics by the combination of a series of characteristics, such as the absence of a posterior appendix of vein R4+5 (third longitudinal vein), the r-m (radial-medial) crossvein located between basal 1/8 and 1/4 of dm (discal medial) cell; sc (subcostal) vein joining c (costal) vein at the level of the r-m crossvein. Antenna as long as or shorter than the distance between antennal fossa and anterior oral margin, with basoflagellomere not furcate. Occiput always narrow in the dorsal half (usually also in ventral half, except in H. ulopodus Hull, 1944).
