= Carreramyia =

Scientific classification
- Kingdom: Animalia
- Phylum: Arthropoda
- Class: Insecta
- Order: Diptera
- Family: Syrphidae
- Subfamily: Microdontinae
- Genus: Carreramyia; Doesburg, 1966

Type species
- Microdon megacephalus Shannon, 1925

Genus of flies

Carreramyia is a genus of hoverflies, with five known species currently.

== Biology ==
Larvae are found in ant nests.

== Distribution ==
Distribution is Neotropical.

== Species ==
- C. flava (Sack, 1941)
- C. jattai Carvalho-Filho, 2014
- C. megacephalus (Shannon, 1925)
- C. megacera Reemer, 2013
- C. tigrina Reemer, 2013
