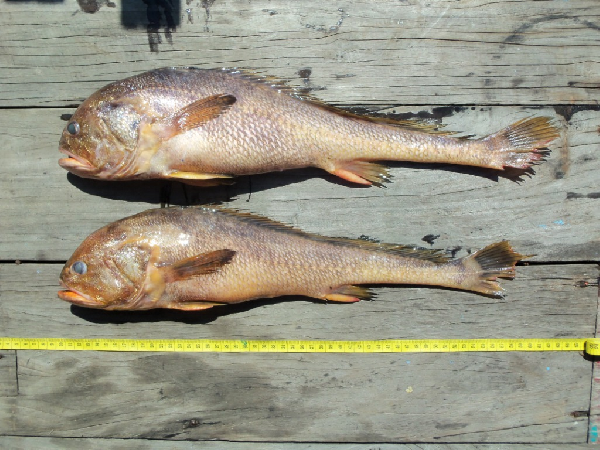
- Armour croaker (Panna perarmatus)

Scientific classification
- Kingdom: Animalia
- Phylum: Chordata
- Class: Actinopterygii
- Order: Acanthuriformes
- Family: Sciaenidae
- Genus: Panna; R. S. Lal Mohan, 1969

Type species
- Otolithus microdon Bleeker, 1849

= Panna (fish) =

Genus of fishes

Panna is a genus of marine ray-finned fish belonging to the family Sciaenidae, the drums and croakers. These fishes are found in southern and southeast Asia.

== Taxonomy ==
Panna was first proposed as a monospecific genus in 1969 by the Indian ichthyologist R. S. Lal Mohan with Otolithus microdon designated as its type species, as well as being the only species. O. microdon was described in 1849 by Pieter Bleeker, with its type locality given as Java. The genus Pachyurus is included in the subfamily Cynoscioninae by some workers, but the 5th edition of Fishes of the World does not recognise subfamilies within the Sciaenidae, which it places in the order Acanthuriformes.

== Etymology ==
Panna is a name that Lal Mohan did not explain, but is thought to be a local name of the type species P. macrodon in India.

== Species ==
There are currently 3 recognized species in this genus:

- Panna heterolepis Trewavas, 1977 (Hooghly croaker)
- Panna microdon (Bleeker, 1849) (Panna croaker)
- Panna perarmatus (Chabanaud, 1926) (Armour croaker)

== Characteristics ==
Panna croakers have a swim bladder characterised by having a pair of tubular appendages starting at the head end which divides almost at its root into a simple rear part and either a simple or branched part at the head end, entering the head through the septum transversum. The maximum published standard lengths of Panna croakers varies from 21.4 cm (8.4 in) in P. heterolepis and 50 cm (20 in) in P. perarmatus.

== Distribution ==
Panna croakers are found in the Indo-West Pacific with P. heterolepis being found off India, Sri Lanka, Bangladesh and Myanmar; P. microdon is found in eastern Malaysia in Perak, the Gulf of Thailand, Vietnam, Borneo, eastern Sumatra and Java; and P. perarmatus is found off Vietnam, in the Gulf of Thailand and Borneo.
