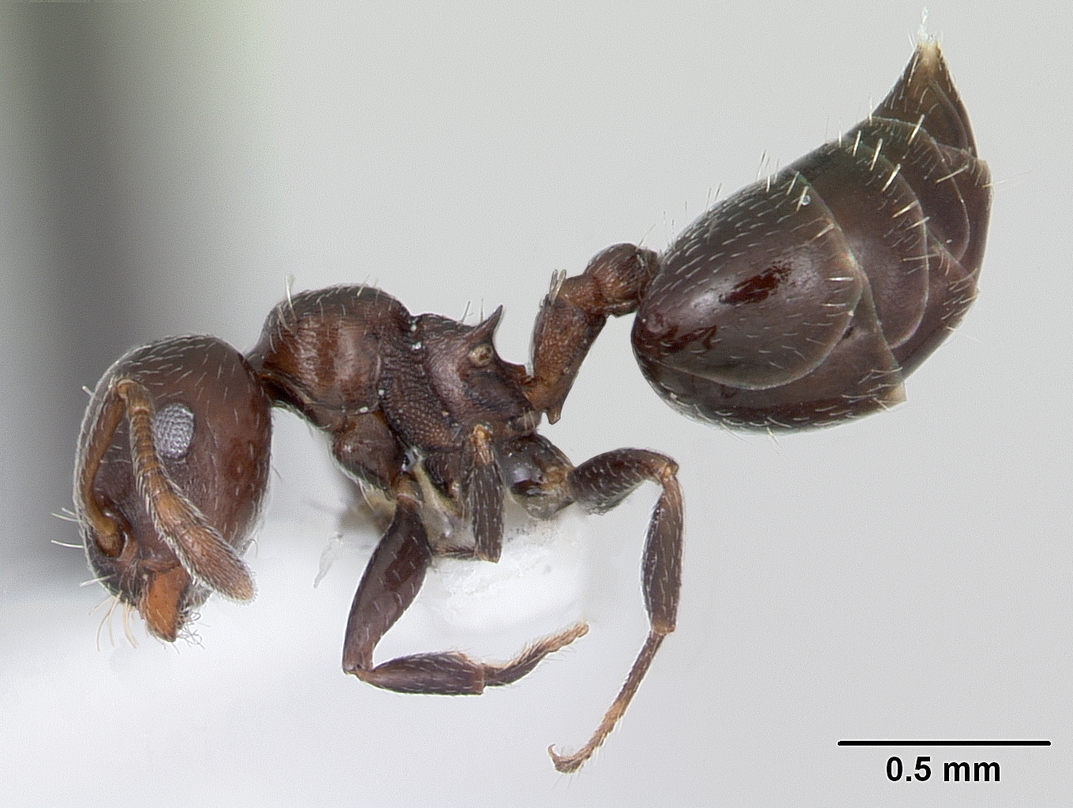

Scientific classification
- Domain: Eukaryota
- Kingdom: Animalia
- Phylum: Arthropoda
- Class: Insecta
- Order: Hymenoptera
- Family: Formicidae
- Subfamily: Myrmicinae
- Genus: Crematogaster
- Species: C. crinosa

Binomial name
- Crematogaster crinosa Mayr, 1862

= Crematogaster crinosa =

Species of ant

Crematogaster crinosa is a species of ant in tribe Crematogastrini. It was described by Mayr in 1862.
