= Microdon =

Microdon may refer to:

- Microdon (fly), a genus of hover flies
- Microdon (plant), a genus of flowering plants in family Scrophulariaceae
- Proscinetes, an extinct genus of ray-finned fish, of family Pycnodontidae, synonym Microdon Agassiz (1833)
- Polypsephis, an extinct genus of ray-finned fish of family Pycnodontidae, Hay, 1899 (=Microdon Agassiz 1833)

== See also ==
- Microdon may also refer to the scientific names of several different species of fish:
  - Cyclothone microdon
  - Haplochromis microdon
  - Lethrinus microdon
  - Lethrinops microdon
  - Pachystomias microdon
  - Panna microdon, a species of Panna fish
  - Pristis microdon
  - Pseudotriakis microdon
  - Salangichthys microdon
- Hyaenodon microdon, an extinct species of carnivorous placental mammals
