= Frank Montgomery Hull =

U.S. entomologist

- Born: November 3, 1901; Coahoma, Mississippi
- Died: July 19, 1982 (aged 80)
- Education: Mississippi Agricultural and Mechanical College, Ohio State University, Harvard University
- Scientific career
- Fields: Entomology
- Workplaces: University of Mississippi

Frank Montgomery Hull (November 3, 1901 – July 19, 1982) was an American naturalist who specialized in entomology, especially Diptera.

== Works ==
- Hull, F.M. (1949). "The Morphology and Inter-relationship of the Genera of Syrphid Flies, Recent and Fossil". Transactions of the Zoological Society of London. 26 (4): 257–408. doi:10.1111/j.1096-3642.1949.tb00224.x.
- Hull, F.M. (1962). "Robber flies of the world". Bulletin of the United States National Museum. 224.
- Hull, F.M. (1973). "Bee Flies of the World: The Genera of the Family Bombyliidae". Bulletin of the United States National Museum.
- Hull, Frank Montgomery (1938). "Exotic forms of syrphid flies". Annals of Carnegie Museum. 27: 121–128. Bibcode:1938AnCM...27..121H. doi:10.5962/p.214430. S2CID 202867610.

== See also ==
- Category:Taxa named by Frank Montgomery Hull
