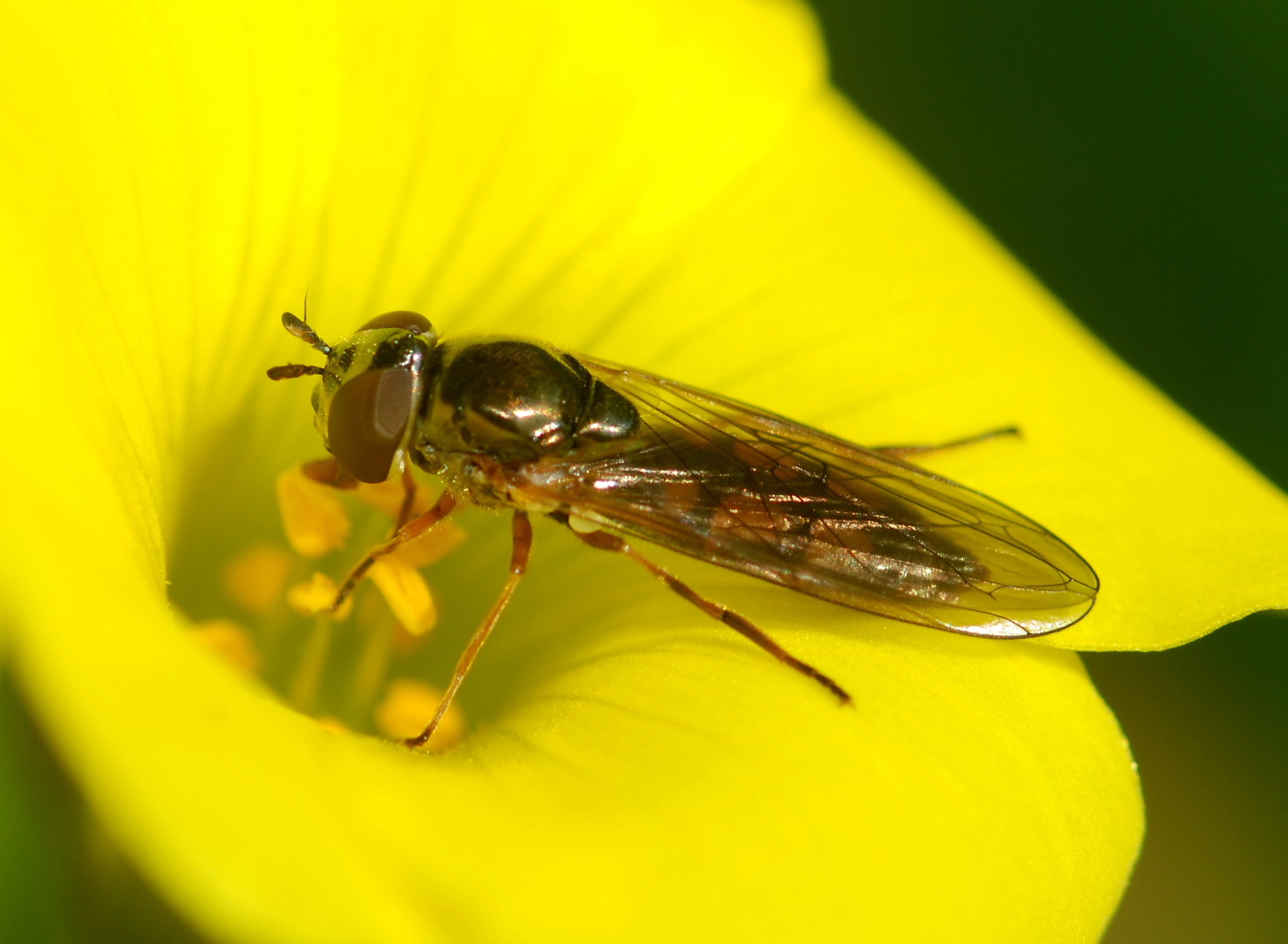
- Melanostoma scalare, female

Scientific classification
- Kingdom: Animalia
- Phylum: Arthropoda
- Class: Insecta
- Order: Diptera
- Superfamily: Syrphoidea
- Family: Syrphidae
- Subfamily: Syrphinae
- Tribe: Melanostomini; Williston, 1885

Type genus
- Melanostoma Schiner, 1860

Genera
- Afroxanthandrus; Argentinomyia; Leucopodella; Melanostoma; Pelloloma; Talahua; Xanthandrus

= Melanostomini =

Tribe of flies

The Melanostomini are a tribe of hoverflies. The tribe was first described as the subfamily Melanostominae by Williston in 1885. The tribe has at times been considered to be synonymous with Bacchini.

== Description ==
Williston first described the group to include the genera Pyrophaena, Platycheirus (as Platychirus), and Melanostoma as follows:

Small, elongate, thinly pilose species, deep black or shining green, the abdomen usually slender, with interrupted bands of bright yellow, orange or greenish yellow color (Syrphus simplex from the West Indies has a black face and entire shining metallic abdominal cross-band); face uniformly black, or at least never with light ground-color. Antennae short, face tuberculate, marginal cell of wing open, third longitudinal vein of wing only gently curved, anterior cross-vein near the base of discal cell; legs slender, hind femora never thickened.

The modern concept of the group has changed considerably from this initial description.

A 2020 molecular phylogenetic study found that Bacchini sensu lato should be divided into two groups: Melanostoma and related genera (i.e., Melanostomini), and Baccha and related genera (i.e., Bacchini).
