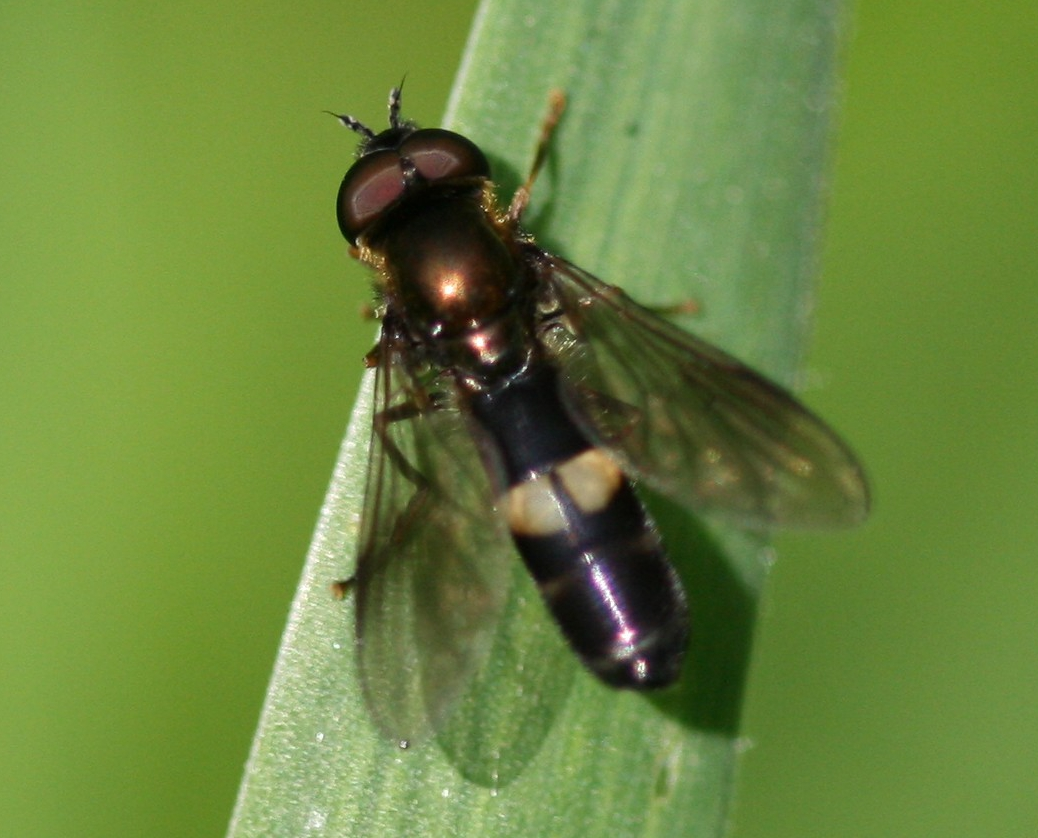
- Platycheirus rosarum male

Scientific classification
- Kingdom: Animalia
- Phylum: Arthropoda
- Clade: Pancrustacea
- Class: Insecta
- Order: Diptera
- Family: Syrphidae
- Genus: Platycheirus
- Subgenus: Pyrophaena; Schiner, 1860

= Pyrophaena =

Subgenus of flies

Pyrophaena is a subgenus of the hoverfly genus Platycheirus distinctive enough to sometimes treated as a separate genus in its own right. Indeed a recent study of the phylogeny of the subfamily Syrphinae found it to be closer to other certain other genera – Rohdendorfia, Syrphocheilosia and Spazigaster. Since only a few species were sampled the true systematic structure must await a more thorough survey of Platycheirus and related genera.

== Species ==
- Platycheirus granditarsus (Forster, 1771)
- Platycheirus rosarum (Fabricius, 1787)
