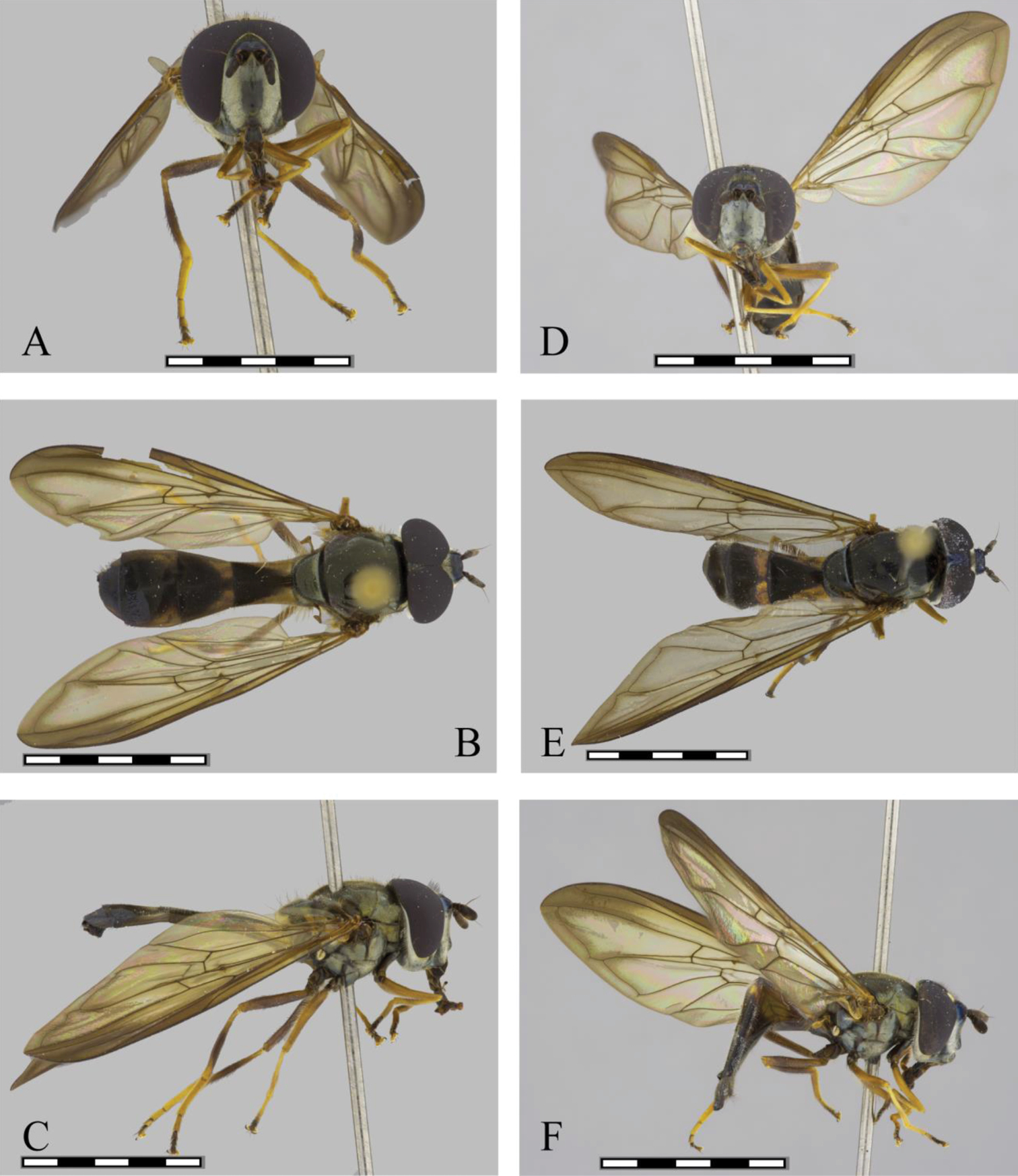
- Argentinomyia

Scientific classification
- Kingdom: Animalia
- Phylum: Arthropoda
- Class: Insecta
- Order: Diptera
- Family: Syrphidae
- Subfamily: Syrphinae
- Tribe: Melanostomini
- Genus: Argentinomyia; Lynch Arribálzaga, 1891

Type species
- Argentinomyia testaceipes Lynch Arribálzaga, 1891

= Argentinomyia =

Genus of flies

Argentinomyia is a small genus of hoverflies.

== Species ==
- A. agonis (Walker, 1849)
- A. altissimus (Fluke, 1945)
- A. berthae (Lima, 1946)
- A. bolivariensis (Fluke, 1945)
- A. browni Fluke, 1945
- A. catabomba (Williston, 1891)
- A. columbianus (Enderlein, 1938)
- A. crenulatus (Williston, 1891)
- A. currani (Fluke, 1937)
- A. fastigata Fluke, 1945
- A. festivus (Fluke, 1945)
- A. funereus (Hull, 1949)
- A. grandis Lynch Arribalzaga, 1892
- A. lanei Fluke, 1936
- A. lineatus (Fluke, 1937)
- A. longicornis Walker, 1837
- A. luculentus (Fluke, 1945)
- A. maculatus (Walker, 1852)
- A. melanocera (Williston, 1891)
- A. neotropicus (Curran, 1937)
- A. nigrans (Fluke, 1945)
- A. octomaculata (Enderlein, 1938)
- A. opacus (Fluke, 1945)
- A. peruvianus (Shannon, 1927)
- A. pollinosa Hull, 1947
- A. praeustus (Loew, 1866)
- A. rex (Fluke, 1945)
- A. rugosonasus (Williston, 1891)
- A. scitulus (Williston, 1888)
- A. testaceipes Lynch Arribalzaga, 1891
- A. thiemei (Enderlein, 1938)
- A. tropicus (Curran, 1937)
