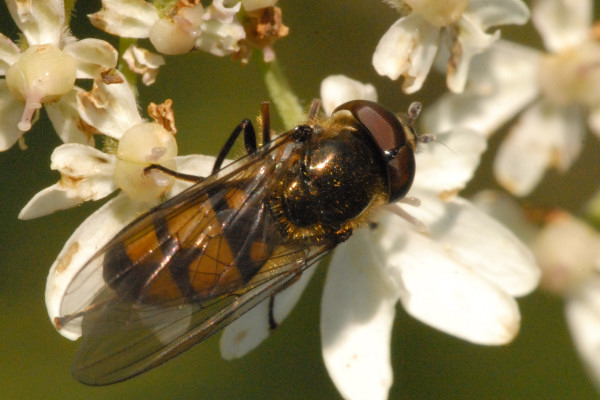
- Xanthandrus comtus

Scientific classification
- Kingdom: Animalia
- Phylum: Arthropoda
- Class: Insecta
- Order: Diptera
- Family: Syrphidae
- Subfamily: Syrphinae
- Tribe: Melanostomini
- Genus: Xanthandrus; Verrall, 1901

Type species
- Musca comtus Harris, 1780

= Xanthandrus =

Genus of flies

Xanthandrus is a small genus of hoverflies.

== Species ==
- X. azorensis Frey, 1945
- X. bucephalus (Wiedemann), 1830
- X. comtus (Harris, 1780)
- X. congensis Curran, 1938
- X. cubanus Fluke, 1936
- X. flavomaculatus Shannon, 1927
- X. mellinoides (Macquart), 1846
- X. mexicanus Curran, 1930
- X. nitidulus Fluke, 1937
- X. palliatus (Fluke), 1945
- X. parhyalinatus (Bigot, 1822)
- X. plaumanni Fluke, 1937

== Former species ==
- Xanthandrus biguttatus Hull, 1945 – now considered a junior synonym of Argentinomyia longicornis
