= Tuberculanostoma =

Scientific classification
- Kingdom: Animalia
- Phylum: Arthropoda
- Class: Insecta
- Order: Diptera
- Family: Syrphidae
- Tribe: Bacchini
- Genus: Tuberculanostoma; Fluke, 1943

Genus of flies

Tuberculanostoma is a genus of hoverflies.

== Species ==
- T. antennatum Fluke, 1943
