= Leucopodella =

Scientific classification
- Kingdom: Animalia
- Phylum: Arthropoda
- Class: Insecta
- Order: Diptera
- Family: Syrphidae
- Tribe: Melanostomini
- Genus: Leucopodella; Hull, 1949

Type species
- Baccha lanei Curran, 1936

Species
- See text

Genus of flies

Leucopodella is a genus of hoverflies. It was described by Frank M. Hull in 1949. It was formerly considered a member of the tribe Bacchini but was placed into Melanostomini by Ximo Mengual in 2020.

== Species ==
- L. balboa (Hull, 1947)
- L. bigoti (Austen, 1893)
- L. bipunctipennis (Hull, 1942)
- L. boabdilla (Hull, 1947)
- L. boadicea (Hull, 1943)
- L. delicatula (Hull, 1943)
- L. gracilis (Williston, 1891)
- L. guianica Reemer, 2010
- L. incompta (Austen, 1893)
- L. marmorata (Bigot, 1884)
- L. nasuta (Williston, 1891)
- L. rubida (Williston, 1891)
- L. zenilla (Hull, 1943)
