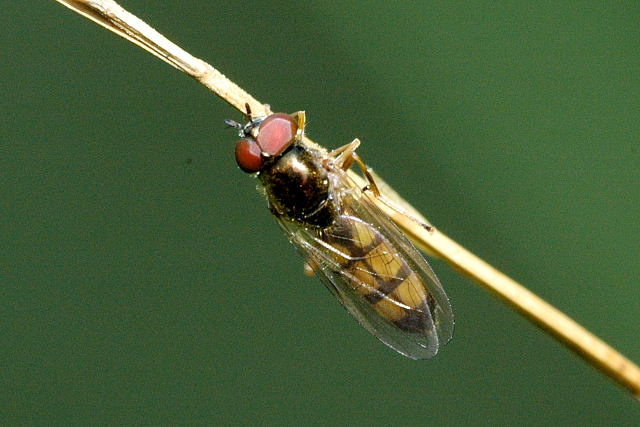
- Male

Scientific classification
- Kingdom: Animalia
- Phylum: Arthropoda
- Class: Insecta
- Order: Diptera
- Family: Syrphidae
- Genus: Melanostoma
- Species: M. mellinum

Binomial name
- Melanostoma mellinum (Linnaeus, 1758)

Synonyms
- List: Melanostoma concolor (Walker, 1851); Melanostoma facultas (Harris, 1780); Musca facultas Harris, 1780; Musca mellinum Linnaeus, 1758; Syrphus concolor Walker, 1851; Melanostoma angustatum Williston, 1887; Melanostoma fallax Curran, 1923; Melanostoma melanderi Curran, 1930; Melanostoma montivagum Johnson, 1916; Melanostoma pachytarse Bigot, 1884; Melanostoma pallitarse Curran, 1926; Melanostoma pictipes Bigot, 1884; Melanostoma pruinosa Bigot, 1884; Musca mellinum Linnaeus, 1758; Syrphus albimanus Fabricius, 1781; Syrphus lachrymosus Say, 1835; *Pachysphyria flavitibia Enderlein, 1938

= Melanostoma mellinum =

Species of fly

Melanostoma mellinum is a very common species of hoverfly found in many parts of Britain, Europe including the Mediterranean basin and North Africa, the East Palearctic, and North America.

A small species, their wingspan range recorded is between 4.7 and 7.0 mm. Very similar to Platycheirus and other Melanostoma species, but with close inspection of some finer details, it can be identified with certainty. Adult males closely resemble Platycheirus clypeatus, but lack the flattening or broadening of the front legs characteristic of most Platycheirus males. Females resemble female Melanostoma scalare, sharing similar triangular tergite markings, but have a shiny, black frons, which separates them from M. scalare and most Platycheirus species. Also, M. mellinum may prove to be a species complex.

Their preferred habitat include grasslands and moorlands, including those in hilly and mountainous regions. Adults can be found feeding on the pollen of grasses (Poaceae) and other wind-pollinated plants.

Little is known of their biology, but the larvae are suspected to be a general predator of small insects in leaf litter.

Flight times in Britain and Ireland are from April to October with peaks in late May - early June and from July to August.
