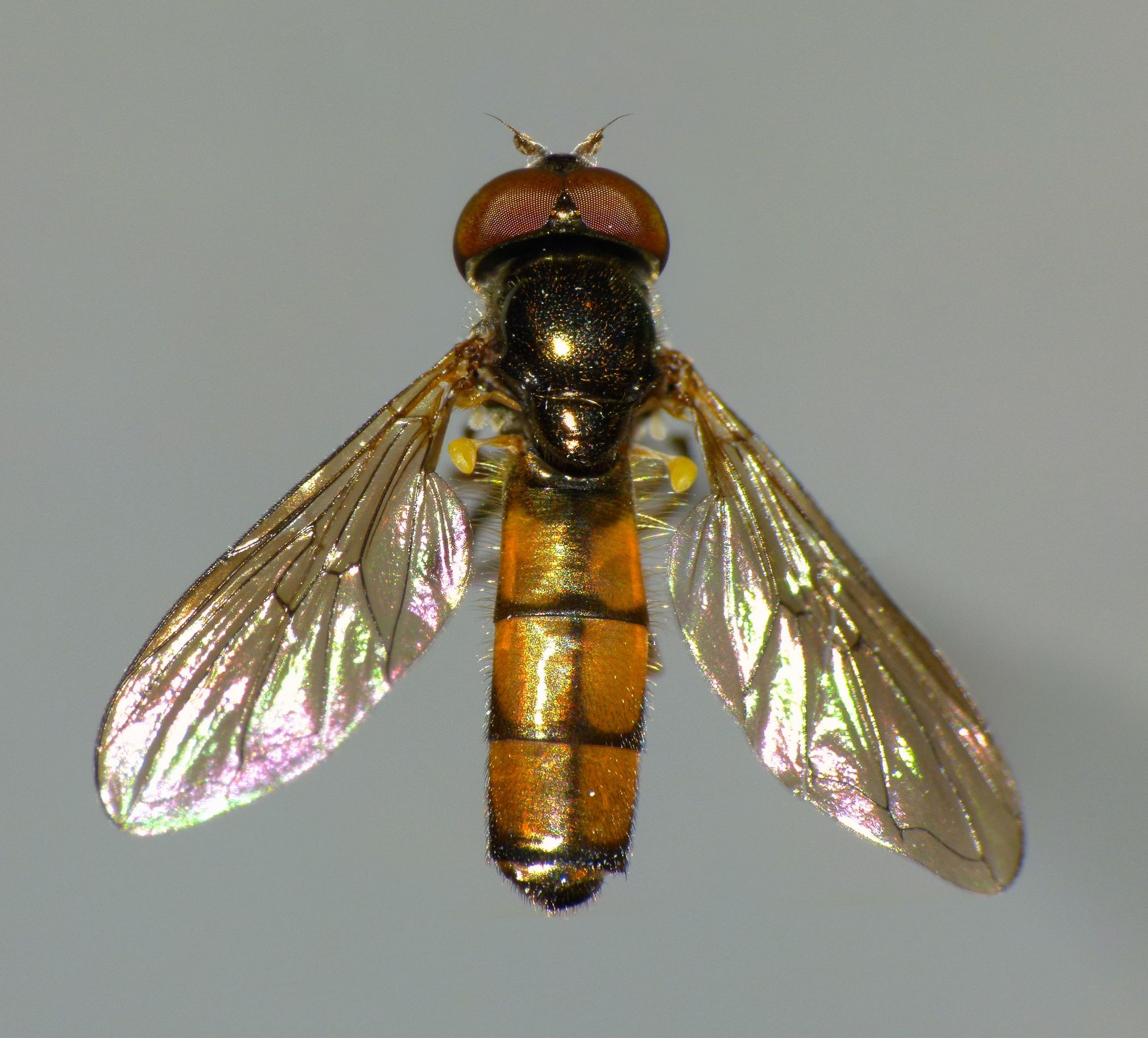

Scientific classification
- Kingdom: Animalia
- Phylum: Arthropoda
- Clade: Pancrustacea
- Class: Insecta
- Order: Diptera
- Family: Syrphidae
- Genus: Melanostoma
- Species: M. fasciatum

Binomial name
- Melanostoma fasciatum (Macquart, 1850)

Synonyms
- Melanostoma apterum Macquart, 1850; Plesia fasciata Hutton, 1901

= Melanostoma fasciatum =

Species of hoverfly

Melanostoma fasciatum is a species of hoverfly found in New Zealand, where it is common in agricultural fields and gardens. Locally dense populations of this hoverfly species might effectively reduce pest infestation. Hence, they are perhaps an effective natural and non-toxic bioagent that may control and reduce aphid and small caterpillar populations.

== Taxonomy ==
Melanostoma fasciatum was first described in 1850 by Pierre-Justin-Marie Macquart as Plesia fasciata. In 1860, Plesia was recognised as a synonym of Melanostoma. Plesia fasciata was then renamed as Melanostoma fasciatum. In 1901, Melanostoma apertum was described from a single specimen from Christchurch. This was later recognised to be a synonym of M. fasciatum.

== Description ==
The adults have a similar appearance to that of Melangyna novaezelandiae, another endemic hoverfly of New Zealand. The body is glossy black but the abdomen has three pairs of yellow patches on three segments. While stationary, the wings are folded over the abdomen. The compound eyes are relatively large and are coloured dark red.

Larvae are legless and are initially pale after hatching from their egg, but will darken as they undergo molts. The rear end of the body has a projections that acts as a breathing tube for the larva.

The eggs are white and may be laid singly or in clusters.

== Distribution/habitat ==
Melanostoma fasciatum is endemic to New Zealand where it is widespread, but appears to be more abundant in the North Island. They are known to occur in grasslands, gardens and other habitat types that have low growing vegetation, especially in agricultural settings.

== Diet ==
As larvae, Melanostoma fasciatum is predatory and is known to prey on aphids and small caterpillars. Due to this choice of diet, these flies are considered a useful bioagent for managing aphid and caterpillar pests on crops. Adults of this species feed on pollen grains from anemophilous species of plant. Pollen grains up to 50μm have been observed in the gut of M. fasciatum adults. Plantago lanceolota and Taraxacum pollen grains have been recorded in the gut of M. fasciatum. The flies will usually eat pollen out of the anther of the plant. The adults also feed on nectar from a range of species (such as Leptospermum and Daucus), but they will generally not feed on pollen from these plants.

== Biocontrol ==
Because of their predatory diet as larvae, Melanostoma fasciatum may be a useful biocontrol agent. In New Zealand, potato crops may be damaged by Bactericera cockerelli, which acts as a vector for pathogens that may cause zebra chip disease in potatoes. It has been proposed that M. fasciatum may be useful for controlling populations of B. cockerelli, which could thereby reduce zebra chip disease. Similarly, it has been suggested that planting Coriandrum sativum near cabbage may attract M. fasciatum and thereby give the cabbage some measure of protection from infestation. However, more research may be needed to confirm how effective this is.
