= Talahua =

Scientific classification
- Kingdom: Animalia
- Phylum: Arthropoda
- Class: Insecta
- Order: Diptera
- Family: Syrphidae
- Tribe: Bacchini
- Genus: Talahua; Fluke, 1945

Genus of flies

Talahua is a genus of hoverflies.

== Species ==
- T. fervida (Fluke, 1945)
