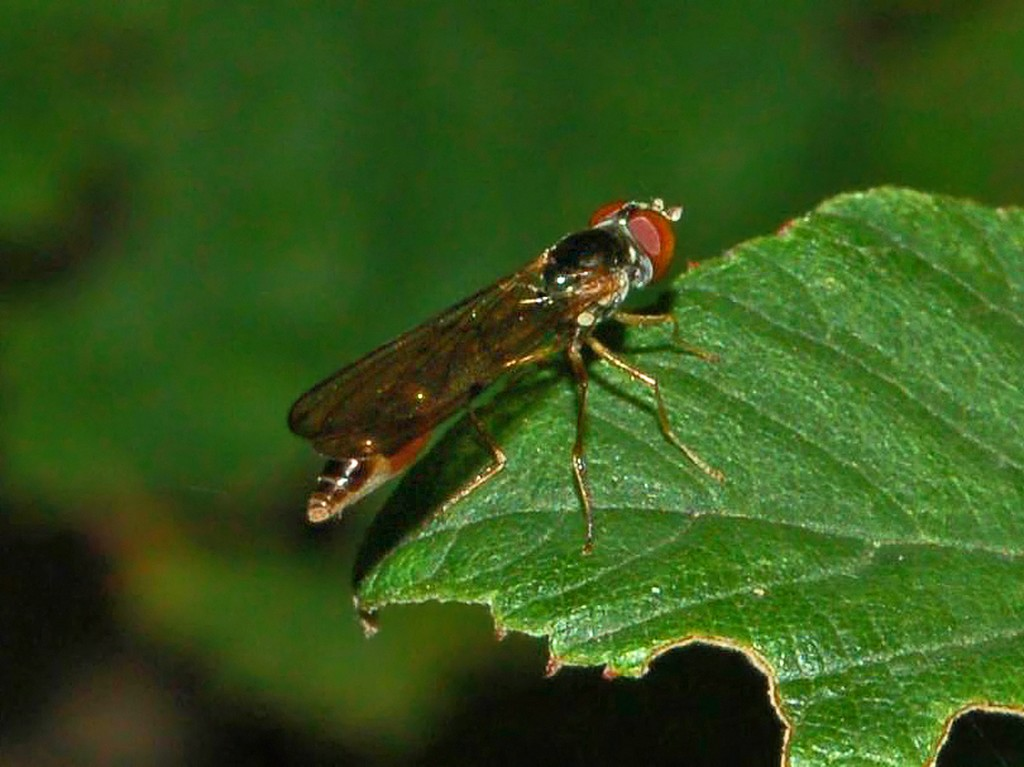
- Dorsal view
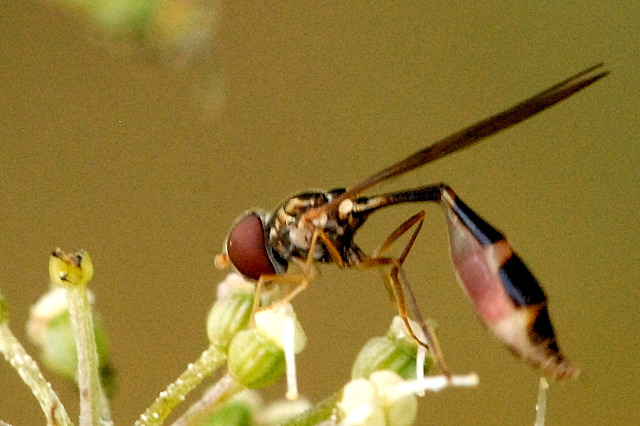
- Female, side view

Scientific classification
- Kingdom: Animalia
- Phylum: Arthropoda
- Class: Insecta
- Order: Diptera
- Family: Syrphidae
- Genus: Baccha
- Species: B. elongata

Binomial name
- Baccha elongata (Fabricius, 1775)

Synonyms
- List: Baccha nigripennis Meigen, 1822; Baccha obscuripennis Meigen, 1822; Baccha perexilis (Harris, [1780]); Baccha scutellata Meigen, 1822; Baccha sphegina Meigen, 1822; Baccha tabida Meigen, 1822; Musca perexilis Harris, [1780]; Syrphus elongatus Fabricius, 1775; Baccha angusta Osten Sacken, 1877; Baccha cognata Loew, 1863; Baccha obscuricornis Loew, 1863; Baccha tricincta Bigot, 1883

= Baccha elongata =

Species of fly

Baccha elongata is a species of hoverfly (or flower fly) in the genus Baccha.

== Distribution and habitat ==
Baccha elongata is present in most of Europe and in North America. Common and widely distributed throughout Britain and Ireland wherever there is suitable habitat though easily overlooked due to its unobtrusive nature. These hoverflies inhabit coniferous and deciduous forests, woodland, hedgerows, scrub and gardens Generally they prefer shady places low to the ground.

== Description ==
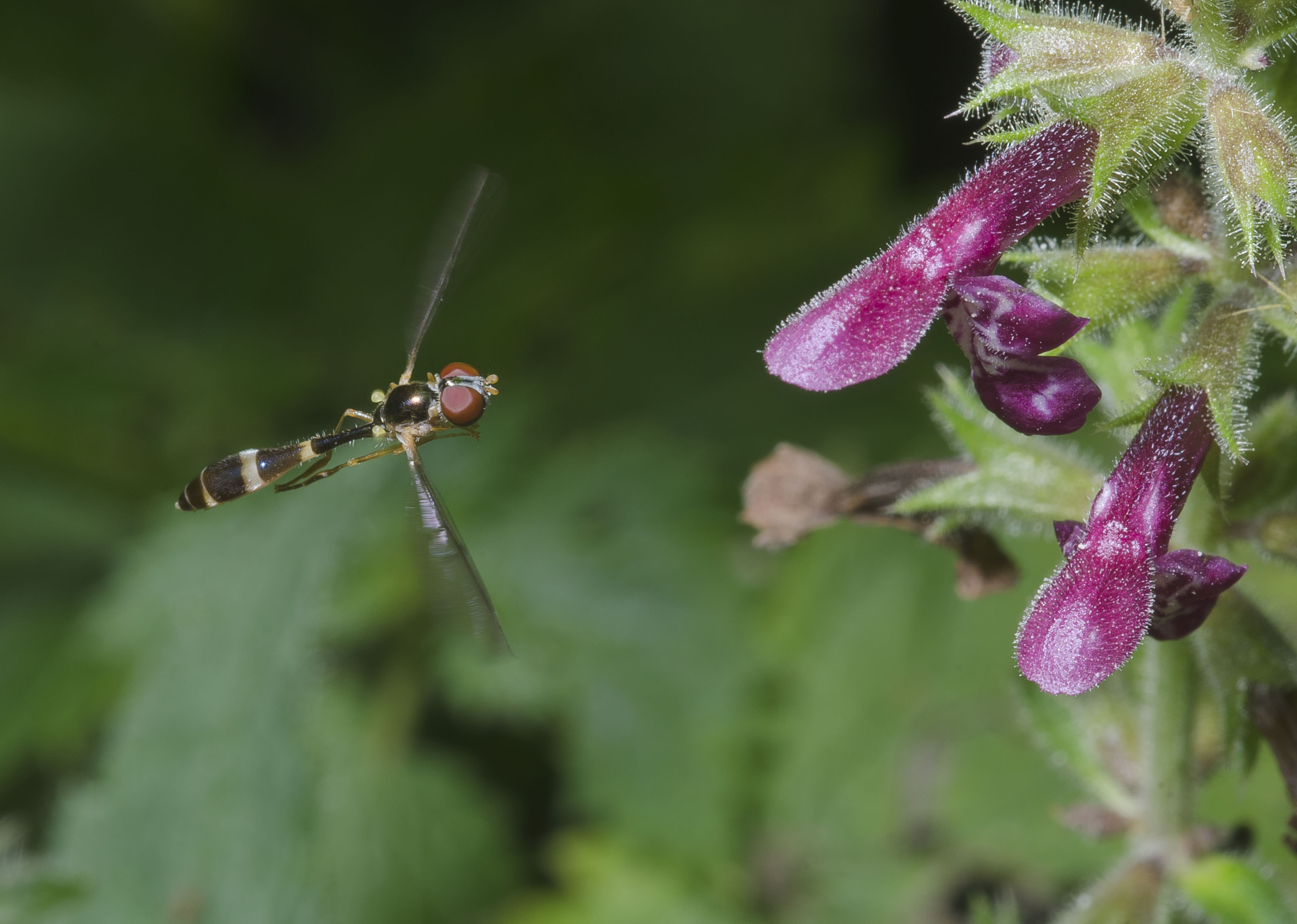
Baccha elongata, female hovering

Baccha elongata can reach a length of 7–11 millimetres (0.28–0.43 in). It is one of the smaller hoverflies, the wing length is around 4.5 to 8 mm.

The long, very slender body of these hoverflies is unmistakable. They also differ from other hoverflies by their elongated, thin abdomen ending in club. This club-shaped abdomen is black with a yellow spot on the 3rd and 4th segments. Legs are brownish yellow. Forehead is brightly hairy.

Members of the eristaline genus Sphegina are also very slender and can be found in similar habitat but those flies have a rather different enlarged hind femur, whereas in Baccha this feature is slender. As with most hoverfly species the sexes can be told apart by the male's eyes meeting on the top of the head, but separated in the female.

This species is very similar to Baccha obscuripennis Meigen, 1822.

== Biology ==
Adults can be seen on the wing from spring until autumn, in two generations (April/June and July/September or October). They mainly feed on pollen and nectar of Compositae, Rosaceae (Alchemilla xanthochlora), Apiaceae (Angelica sylvestris, Heracleum sphondylium) and Hedera species.

As with most other members of the subfamily Syrphinae the larvae are predatory though there seems to be a preference for a variety of different ground-layer aphids. This species overwinters as a larva.

Video clip. Female

== Bibliography ==
- Ball, S.G.; Morris, R.K.A. (2000). Provisional atlas of British hoverflies (Diptera, Syrphidae). Monks Wood, UK: Biological Record Centre. ISBN 1-870393-54-6.
- Morris, Roger K. A. (1999). Hoverflies of Surrey. Surrey Wildlife Trust. p. 244. ISBN 0-9526065-3-4.
- Speight, M.C.D. (2011). "Species accounts of European Syrphidae (Diptera)" (PDF). Syrph the Net, the database of European Syrphidae.
- Stubbs, Alan E.; Falk, Steven J (1983). British Hoverflies: An Illustrated Identification Guide (2nd ed.). British Entomological and Natural History Society. ISBN 1-899935-03-7.
- Van Veen, M.P. (2010). Hoverflies of Northwest Europe, Identification Keys to the Syrphidae. Utrecht: KNNV Publishing. p. 254. ISBN 978-9050111997.
