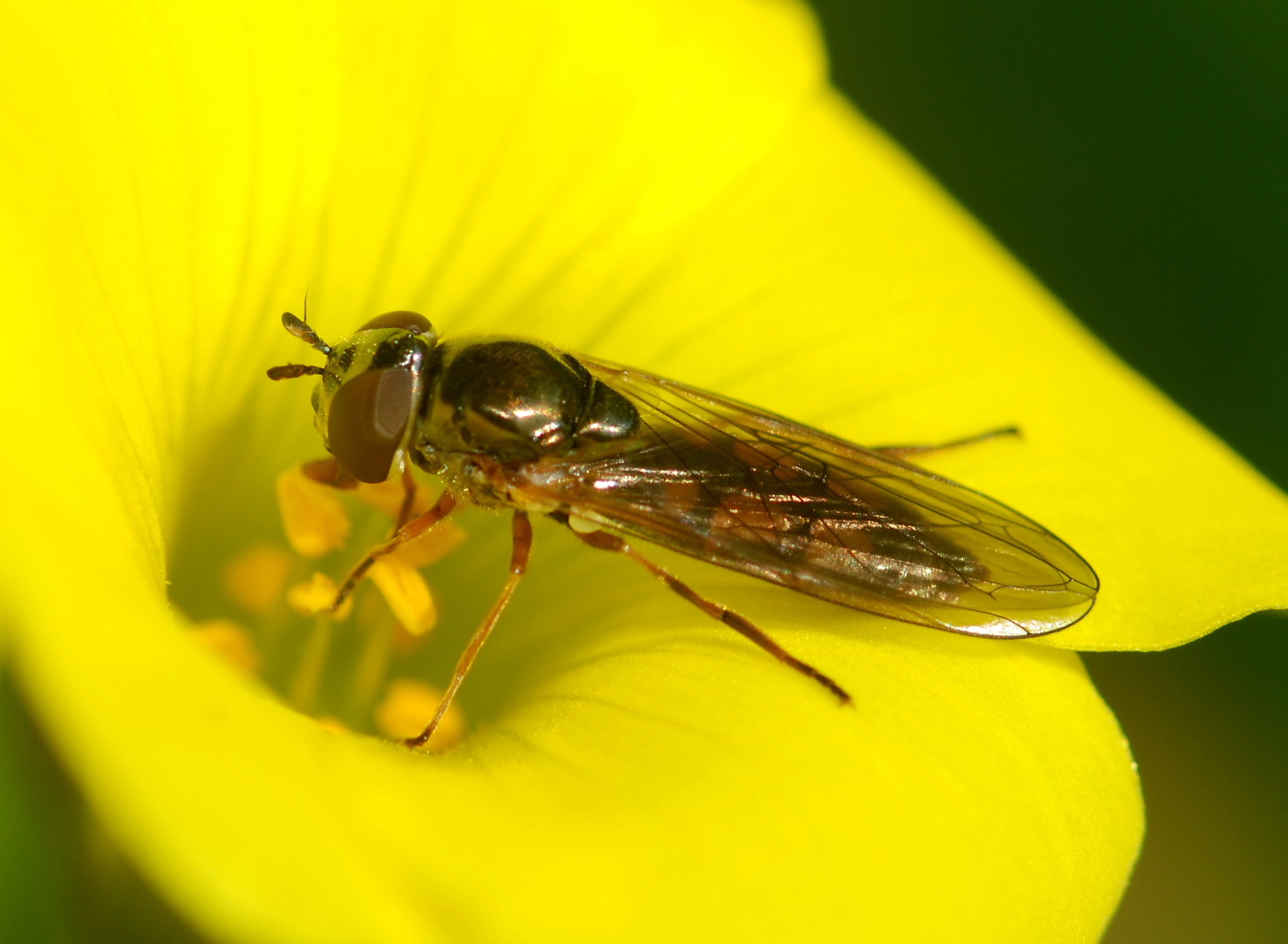
- Melanostoma scalare female

Scientific classification
- Kingdom: Animalia
- Phylum: Arthropoda
- Class: Insecta
- Order: Diptera
- Family: Syrphidae
- Subfamily: Syrphinae
- Tribe: Melanostomini
- Genus: Melanostoma; Schiner, 1860

Type species
- Musca millina Linnaeus, 1758

Synonyms
- Afrostoma Skevington, Thompson & Vockeroth, 2014

= Melanostoma =

Genus of flies

Melanostoma sp., oviposition

Melanostoma is a large genus of hoverflies. Little is known of their biology, but they are suspected to be general predators of small insects in leaf litter.

== Species ==
- M. abdominale Shiraki, 1930
- M. aenoscutum Hull, 1964
- M. algens Curran, 1931
- M. alpinum Szilády, 1942
- M. alticola Speiser, 1910
- M. annulipes Macquart, 1842
- M. apicale Bigot, 1884
- M. atrum Sack, 1932
- M. aurantiaca Becker, 1921
- M. babyssa (Walker, 1849)
- M. babyssola Speiser, 1924
- M. bergmani Doesburg, 1966
- M. bicruciatum (Bigot, 1884)
- M. bituberculatum Loew, 1858
- M. boreomontanum Mutin, 1986
- M. diffusum Hull, 1941
- M. dubium (Zetterstedt, 1838)
- M. elongatum Matsumura, 1919
- M. eversmanni Enderlein, 1938
- M. fasciatum (Macquart, 1850)
- M. flavipenne Matsumura, 1919
- M. flavipleurum Hull, 1964
- M. floripeta Speiser, 1910
- M. fumivenosum Doesburg, 1966
- M. gedehense Meijere, 1914
- M. gymnocera Bigot, 1891
- M. incisum Matsumura, 1916
- M. incompletum Becker, 1908 - Canarian endemic species
- M. incurvum Dirickx, 2001
- M. infuscatum Becker, 1909
- M. keiseri Dirickx, 2001
- M. matilei Dirickx, 2001
- M. meijerei Goot, 1964
- M. mellinum (Linnaeus, 1758)
- M. motodomariense Matsumura, 1919
- M. normale Curran, 1931
- M. ochraceum Dirickx, 2001
- M. orientale Wiedemann, 1824
- M. otaniense Matsumura, 1919
- M. pedius Walker, 1852
- M. perinetense Dirickx, 2001
- M. pumicatum (Meigen, 1838)
- M. pyrophaenoides Speiser, 1910
- M. quadrifasciatum Curran, 1928
- M. quadripunctatum (Skevington & Thompson, 2014)
- M. satyriphilum Hull, 1941
- M. scalare (Fabricius, 1794)
- M. simplex Doesburg, 1955
- M. subbituberculatum Kassebeer, 2000
- M. sulphuripes Hull, 1964
- M. sylvarum Hull, 1941
- M. teizonis Matsumura, 1919
- M. tenuis Matsumura, 1919
- M. tiantaiensis Huo & Zheng, 2003
- M. transversum Shiraki & Edashige, 1953
- M. trochanteratum Hull, 1964
- M. tumescens Szilády, 1940
- M. univittatum Wiedemann, 1824
- M. violaceum Hull, 1964
- M. wollastoni Wakeham-Dawson, Aguiar, Smit, McCullough & Wyatt, 2004
