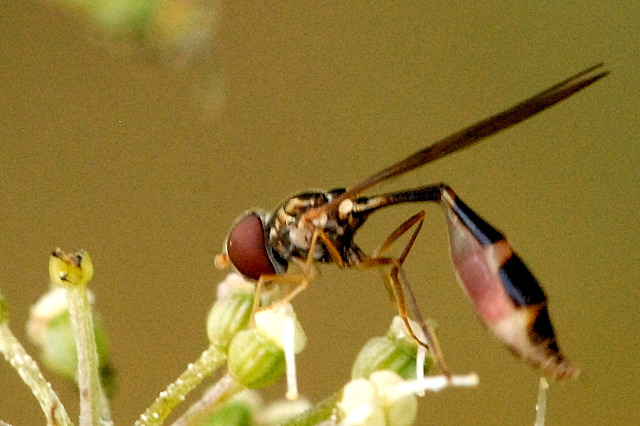
- Baccha elongata Female

Scientific classification
- Kingdom: Animalia
- Phylum: Arthropoda
- Clade: Pancrustacea
- Class: Insecta
- Order: Diptera
- Family: Syrphidae
- Subfamily: Syrphinae
- Tribe: Bacchini
- Genus: Baccha; Fabricius, 1805

Type species
- Syrphus elongatus Fabricius, 1775

Species
- See text

= Baccha =

Genus of flies

Baccha is a genus of hoverflies in the subfamily Syrphinae. They are typically moderate sized with wasp-like bodies. Their larvae are predatory, often on aphids.

== Description ==
This genus is extremely slender with a club shaped abdomen that is at least 25 times as long as its narrowest width They range in length from about 7 to 10 mm. The wings are either clear or have very faint brownish markings, have an alula that is much narrower than cell c at its base, a reduced anal angle, and small bare spots near the base, with faint clouding along The apical crossveins. The eyes have very short and sparse hairs, while its frons and face are mostly pollinose and black. The antennae are yellow to black and very short, with the scape at least as deep as it is long. The thorax has short hairs on its scutum, which is mostly shining lightly pollinose above and on the sides, which are either entirely black or with a few yellow margins. The scutellum is similarly colored, but with pile only as a fringe laterally. On the pleural area the anterior anepisternum, meron, metapleuron, and metasternum are all bare. The upper and lower katepisternal hair patches are widely separated. The postmetacoxal bridge is complete. There is also no posteromedial apical hair tuft on the hind coxa. In the male, the abdomens are about 40 times longer than the shortest width of segment 2, while female abdomens are 25 or more times longer than the shortest width of segment 2. In addition to being dark brown to black in color throughout in most specimens, there are reddish hues towards the apex for some females, as well as yellow spots or bands appearing on tergites 2-5, which vary by species. (see these two references for keys to the genera)

== Species ==
- B. bistriatus Kohli, 1987
- B. cognata Loew, 1863
- B. elongata (Fabricius, 1775)
- B. euryptera Violovitsh, 1976
- B. laphrieformis Violovitsh, 1976
- B. maculata Walker, 1852
- B. nana Violovitsh, 1976
- B. okadomaei Violovitsh, 1976
- B. optata Violovitsh, 1976
- B. perexilis Harris, 1776
- B. sachalinica Violovitsh, 1976
- B. shirakii Violovitsh, 1976
- B. sibirica Violovitsh, 1976
- B. strandi Duda, 1940
