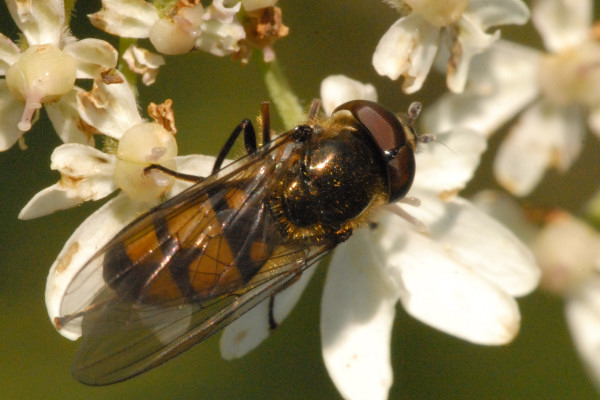

Scientific classification
- Kingdom: Animalia
- Phylum: Arthropoda
- Class: Insecta
- Order: Diptera
- Family: Syrphidae
- Genus: Xanthandrus
- Species: X. comtus

Binomial name
- Xanthandrus comtus (Harris, 1780)

Synonyms
- Musca comtus Harris, 1780; Scaeva hyalinatus Fallén, 1817; Xanthandrus hyalinatus (Fallén, 1817)

= Xanthandrus comtus =

Species of fly

Xanthandrus comtus is a species of hoverfly. It is found in the Palearctic.

== Description ==
External images For terms see Morphology of Diptera
Wing length Wide abdomen with yellow marks. Thoracic dorsum polished black. Male with round marks on tergite 2 and confluent marks on tergites 3 and 4 (as a deeply incised band). Female with oval marks on tergite 2 and square marks on tergites 3 and 4. legs mainly orange. Antenne orange. Long black pterostigma. The male genitalia and larvae are figured by Dusek and Laska (1967). See references for determination.

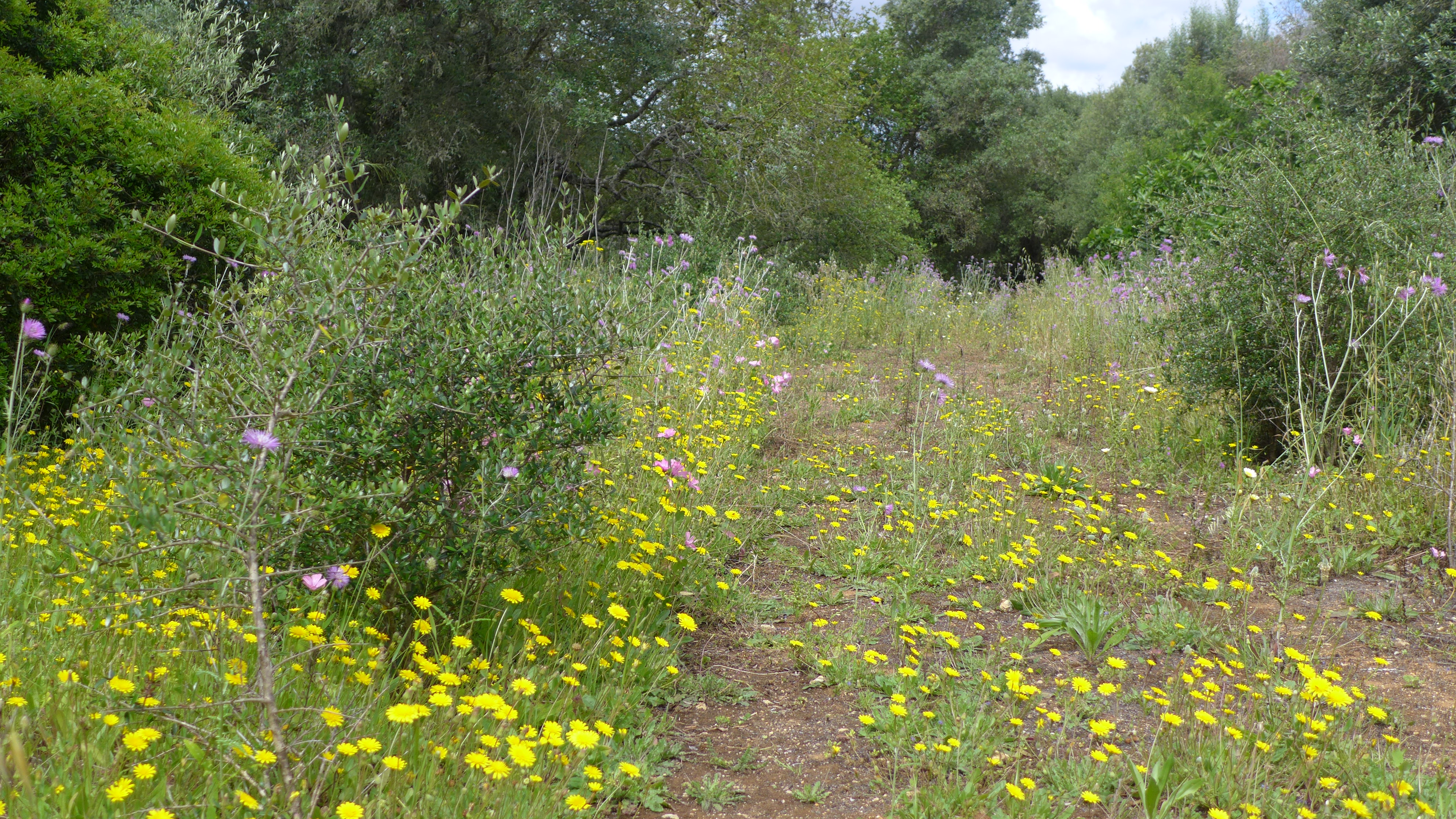
Habitat.Portugal

== Distribution ==
Palearctic Southern Norway South to Iberia. Ireland East through Central Europe and Southern Europe to Russia and the Caucasus and on to the Russian Far East and the Pacific coast; Japan; Formosa.

== Biology ==
Habitat: Fagus, Quercus and Pinus forest and scrub. Flowers visited include umbellifers, Arbutus unedo, Filipendula, Juncus, Leontodon, Lonicera, Mentha aquatica, Rosa, Rubus, Succisa.

The larvae predate aphids and the caterpillars of various small moths including Tortricidae both on trees and low-growing plants. They are also predators of the caterpillars of the pine processionary moths Thaumetopoea pinivora and Thaumetopoea pityocampa.
