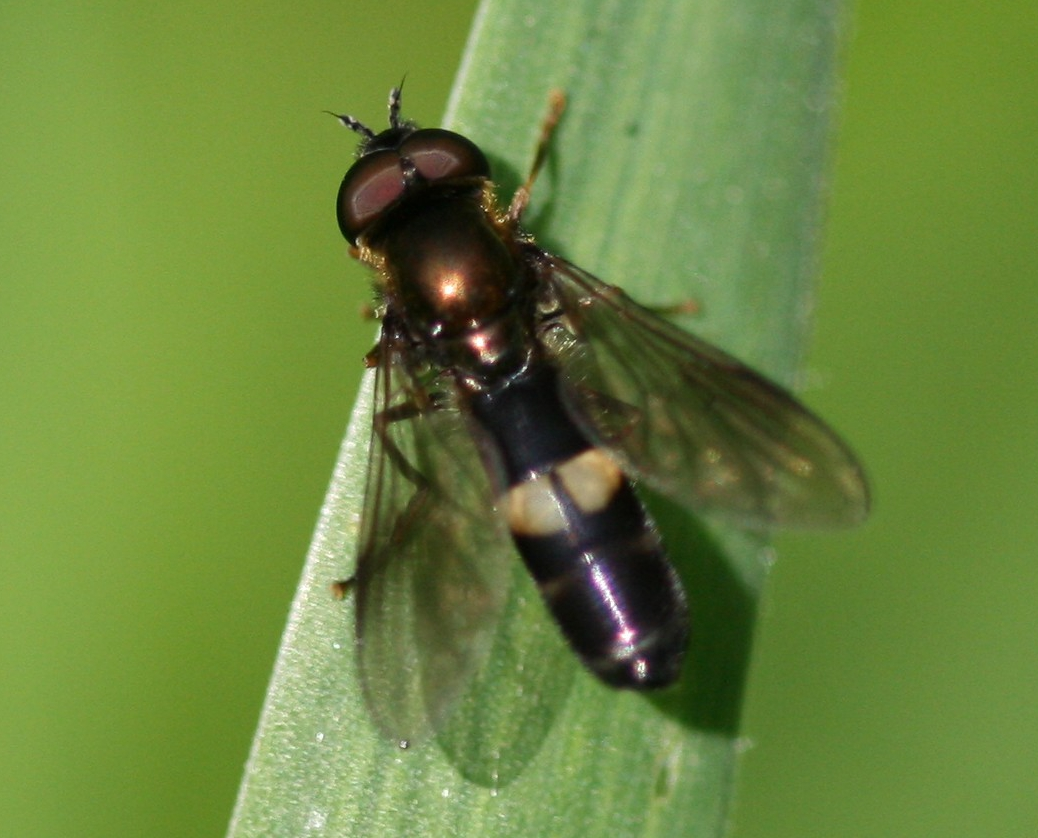
- Male
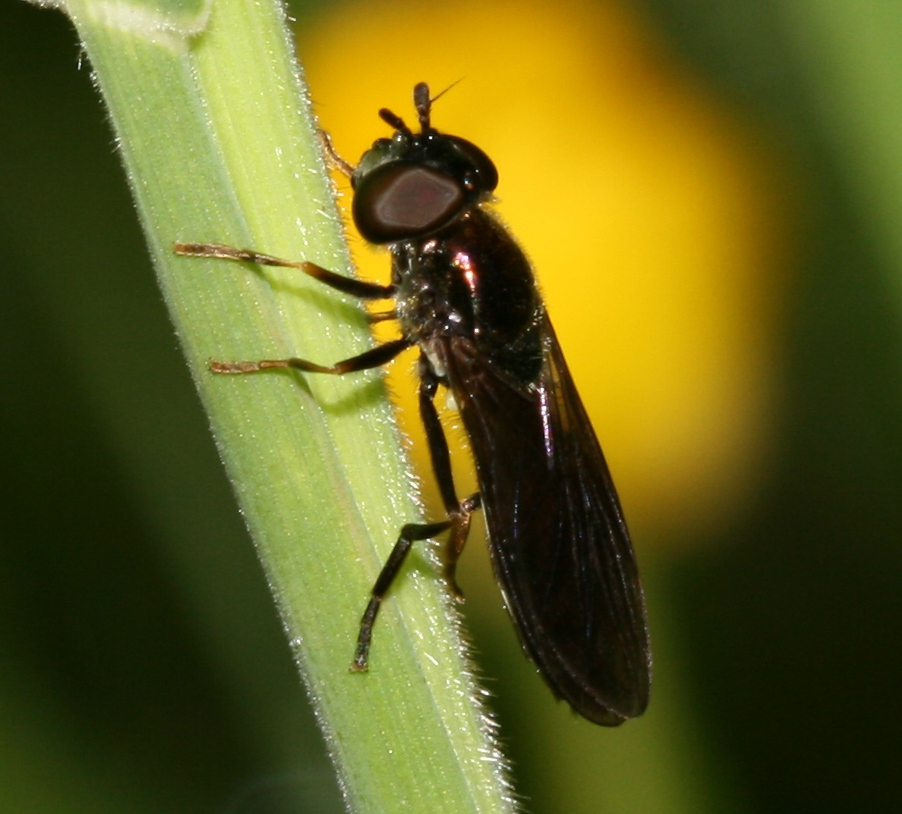
- Female

Scientific classification
- Kingdom: Animalia
- Phylum: Arthropoda
- Clade: Pancrustacea
- Class: Insecta
- Order: Diptera
- Family: Syrphidae
- Genus: Platycheirus
- Species: P. rosarum

Binomial name
- Platycheirus rosarum (Fabricius, 1787)

Synonyms
- Pyrophaena rosarum (Fabricius, 1787)

= Platycheirus rosarum =

Species of fly

Platycheirus rosarum is a species of hoverfly found in the Holarctic realm. Like its close relative Platycheirus granditarsus, it can be found in marshy meadows and ditches; indeed, the two species can often be found together. The flight time is between May and October, though it peaks in abundance in June and July. Like other hoverfly in this genus, its larvae feed on aphids.

== Description ==
External images For terms, see: Morphology of Diptera.
Tergite 2 is black. Tergite 3 and sometimes tergite 4 have a divided whitish to yellowish band. Male metatarsus 1 lacks a protuberance. Wings have a violet sheen.

See references for determination.

== Distribution ==
Palearctic: Fennoscandia south to Iberia and the Mediterranean basin, Ireland eastward through Europe to European Russia and Siberia. Nearctic: Alaska to Nova Scotia and south to New Jersey.

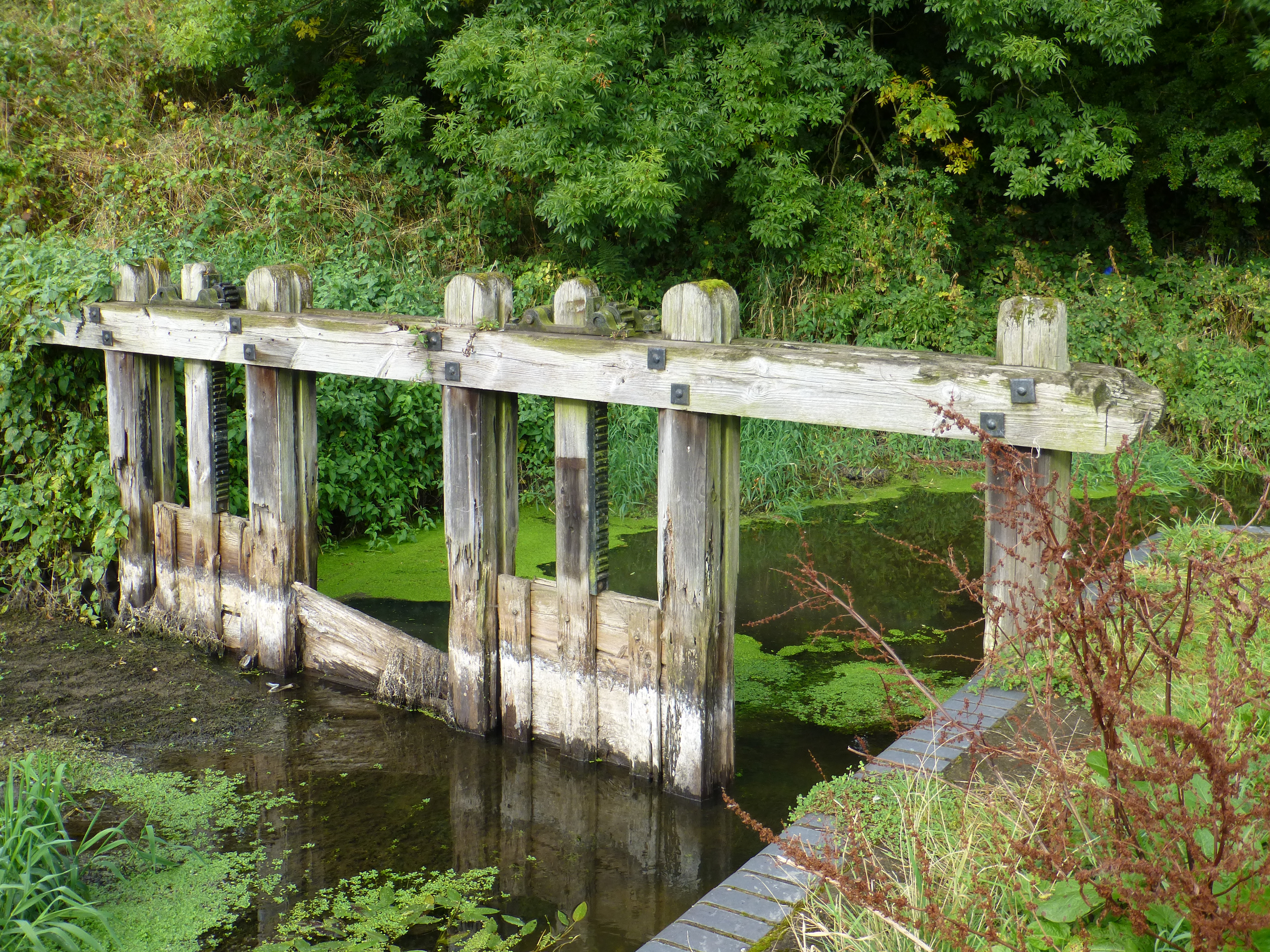
Habitat: Ireland.

== Biology ==
Habitat: River, stream and pond margins with tall herbaceous vegetation and fen. Around the periphery of bogs, Salix swamp.
