= Melanostoma apicale =

Scientific classification
- Kingdom: Animalia
- Phylum: Arthropoda
- Clade: Pancrustacea
- Class: Insecta
- Order: Diptera
- Family: Syrphidae
- Genus: Melanostoma
- Species: M. apicale

Binomial name
- Melanostoma apicale Bigot, 1884

Species of hoverfly

Melanostoma apicale is a species of hoverfly in the family Syrphidae. It was described by Jacques Marie François Bigot in 1884.

== Description ==
Melanostoma apicale can be distinguished from the closely related Melanostoma univittatum by morphological characters including the male surstylus, which tapers to a slender, acute apex. In females, the frons is mainly shiny, with two large lateral pollinose maculae whose shiny areas reach the eye margin.

== Distribution ==
The species is recorded from New Guinea, Australia, New Caledonia, the Solomon Islands, Fiji, Tonga and Samoa.

== Taxonomy ==
Melanostoma apicale has historically been confused with Melanostoma univittatum. The latter name was applied to M. apicale in some earlier records, but modern taxonomic treatment distinguishes the two species.
