= Melanostoma dubium =

Scientific classification
- Kingdom: Animalia
- Phylum: Arthropoda
- Class: Insecta
- Order: Diptera
- Family: Syrphidae
- Genus: Melanostoma
- Species: M. dubium

Binomial name
- Melanostoma dubium Zetterstedt, 1837

Synonyms
- Chilosia freyi Hellen, 1949; Pachysphyria sexpunctata Enderlein, 1938; Pachysphyria flavitibia Enderlein, 1938

Species of fly

Melanostoma dubium is a Palearctic species of hoverfly.

== Description ==
A small black (4–6 mm long) fly, dark bronze or green bronze, with pale abdominal markings. It is hard to separate this species from other Melanostoma.

== Distribution and biology ==
Found from Fennoscandia south to the Pyrenees and from Scotland east through North Europe and the mountains Central Europe into European Russia and on through Siberia to Yakutia. The habitat is montane and alpine grassland and moor. Flowers visited include Carex, Potentilla erecta, Ranunculus. Flies from July to August dependent on altitude.
