= Syrphocheilosia =

- Syrphocheilosia claviventris

Scientific classification
- Kingdom: Animalia
- Phylum: Arthropoda
- Clade: Pancrustacea
- Class: Insecta
- Order: Diptera
- Family: Syrphidae
- Subfamily: Syrphinae
- Tribe: Bacchini
- Genus: Syrphocheilosia; Stackelberg, 1864

Genus of flies

Syrphocheilosia is a genus of hoverflies.

== Species ==
- Syrphocheilosia aterrima Stackelberg, 1964
- Syrphocheilosia claviventris (Strobl, 1909)
