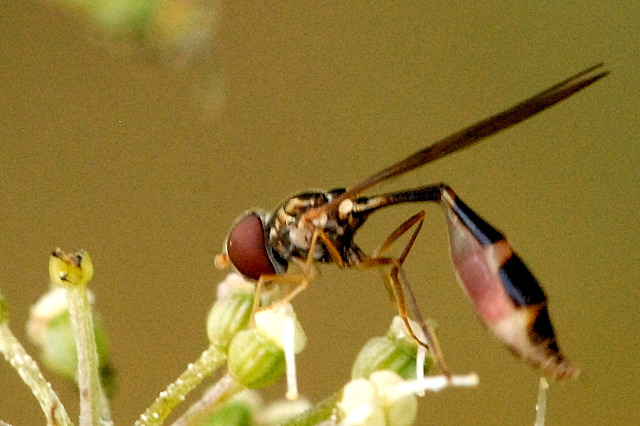
- Baccha elongata

Scientific classification
- Kingdom: Animalia
- Phylum: Arthropoda
- Class: Insecta
- Order: Diptera
- Superfamily: Syrphoidea
- Family: Syrphidae
- Subfamily: Syrphinae
- Tribe: Bacchini

Genera
- See text

= Bacchini =

Tribe of flies

The Bacchini are a tribe of hoverflies. The tribe Bacchini contains a worldwide distribution of over 430 species. They are mostly small elongate flies with black heads and scutellum. Larvae are predatory, mainly upon aphids, like others in the subfamily Syrphinae, itself containing around 1,600 species. They in turn belong to the family Syrphidae with over 6,200 species worldwide.

== List of genera ==
- Baccha Fabricius, 1805
- Eocheilosia Hull, 1949
- Platycheirus Lepeletier & Serville, 1828
- Pyrophaena Schiner, 1860
- Rohdendorfia Smirnov, 1924
- Spazigaster Rondani, 1843
- Syrphocheilosia Stackelberg, 1864
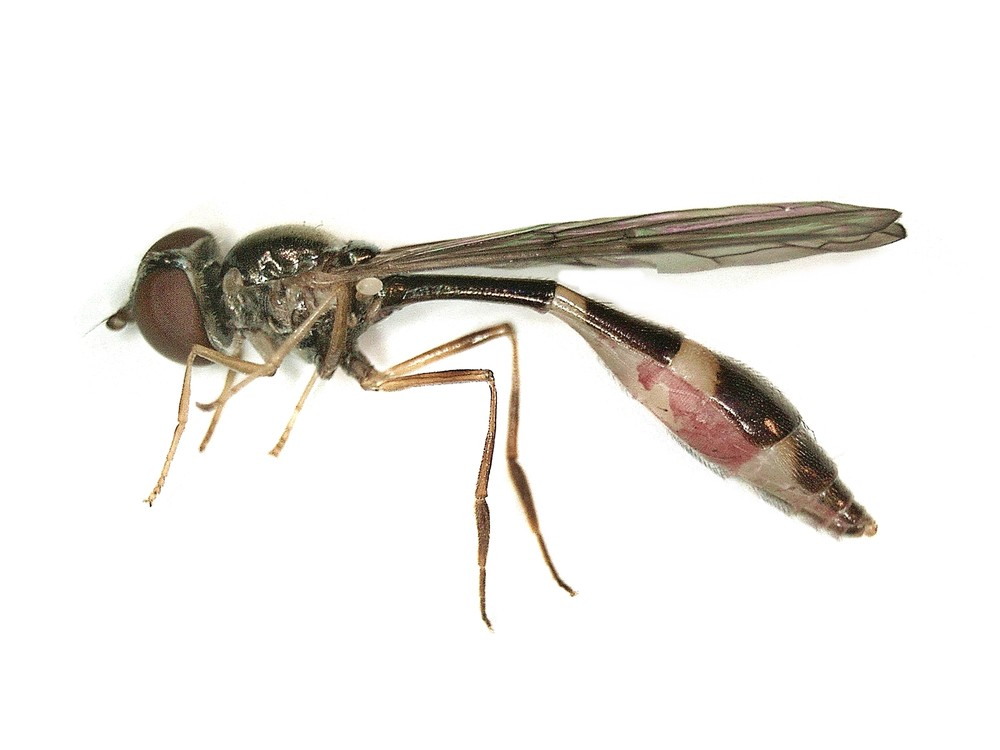
Baccha elongata

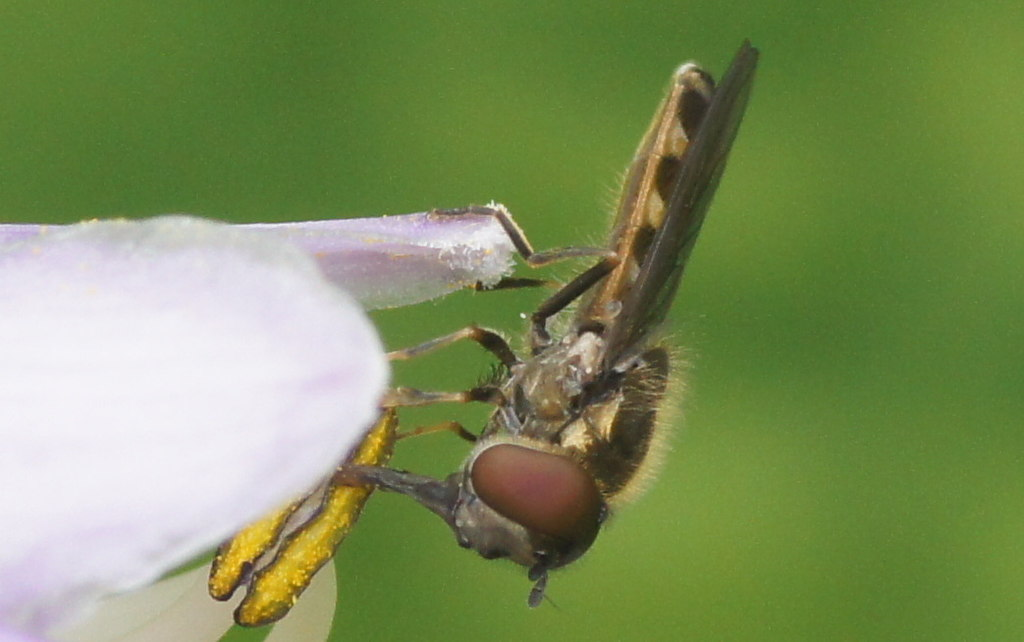
Platycheirus scutatus

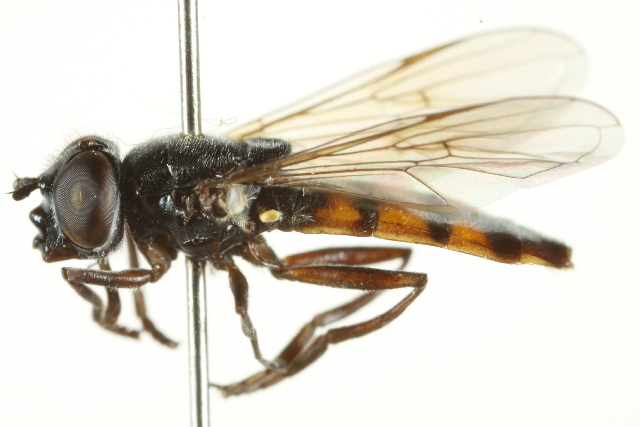
Rohdendorfia sp.

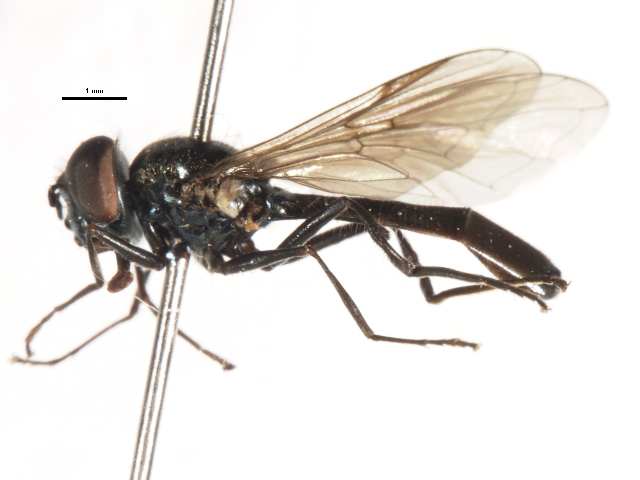
Spazigaster sp.
