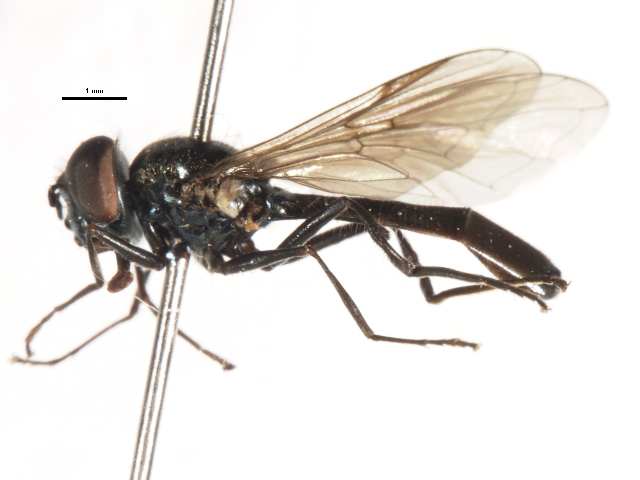
- Spazigaster ambulans

Scientific classification
- Kingdom: Animalia
- Phylum: Arthropoda
- Clade: Pancrustacea
- Class: Insecta
- Order: Diptera
- Family: Syrphidae
- Tribe: Bacchini
- Genus: Spazigaster; Rondani, 1843

= Spazigaster =

Genus of flies

Spazigaster is a genus of hoverflies.

== Species ==
There are three recognized species:

- Spazigaster allochroma Cheng, 2012
- Spazigaster ambulans (Fabricius, 1798)
- Spazigaster nostra Zimina, 1963
