= Rohdendorfia =

Scientific classification
- Kingdom: Animalia
- Phylum: Arthropoda
- Clade: Pancrustacea
- Class: Insecta
- Order: Diptera
- Family: Syrphidae
- Tribe: Bacchini
- Genus: Rohdendorfia; Smirnov, 1924

Genus of flies

Rohdendorfia is a genus of hoverflies.

== Species ==
Rohdendorfia contains 5 accepted species:

- Rohdendorfia alpina Sack, 1938
- Rohdendorfia bella Mengual, 2019
- Rohdendorfia dimorpha Smirnov, 1924
- Rohdendorfia khakimovi Barkalov, 2019
- Rohdendorfia montivaga Violovitsh, 1984
