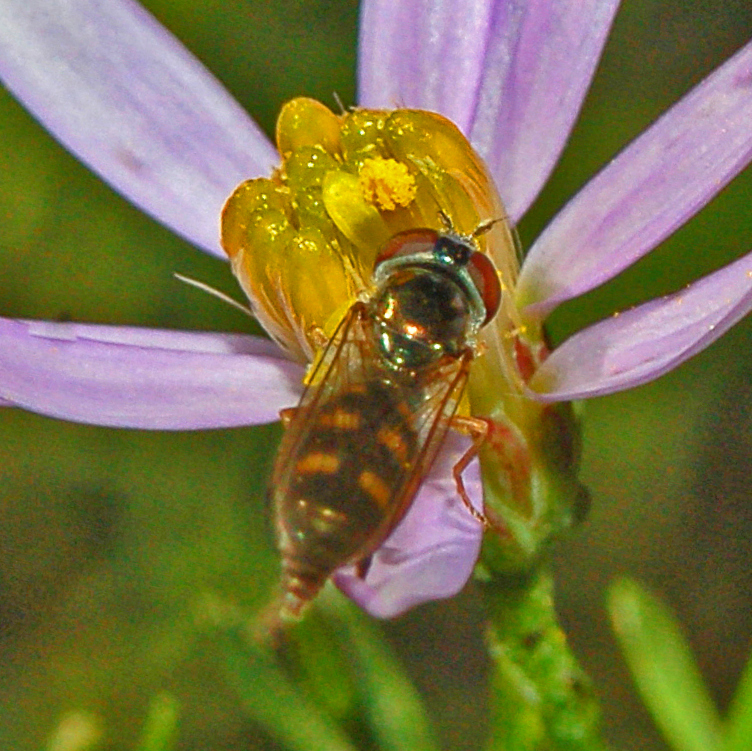
- Female of Platycheirus scutatus

Scientific classification
- Kingdom: Animalia
- Phylum: Arthropoda
- Clade: Pancrustacea
- Class: Insecta
- Order: Diptera
- Family: Syrphidae
- Genus: Platycheirus
- Subgenus: Platycheirus
- Species: P. scutatus

Binomial name
- Platycheirus scutatus (Meigen, 1822)

Synonyms
- Syrphus scutatus Meigen, 1822

= Platycheirus scutatus =

Species of fly

Platycheirus scutatus is a very common species of hoverfly. It is a Holarctic species.

== Description ==
External images For terms, see: Morphology of Diptera.
Face has two large, silver-grey dust spots. Wing: Tibia 2 is in-bent 1/3 from apex and with only short lateral hairs. Tergite 4 is elongate.

See references for determination.

== Distribution ==
Palearctic: Fennoscandia south to Iberia and the Mediterranean basin from Ireland eastward through Northern Europe, Central Europe and Southern Europe into Turkey and European Russia and through Siberia to the Pacific coast and Japan. Nearctic: Alaska south to Colorado. But see Speight (2011).

== Biology ==
The larvae feed on aphids on low-growing plants and trees. Adults feed on a wide range of flowers. They have multiple broods throughout the warmer months and have a very long flight period. They may stay active during cold weather.
