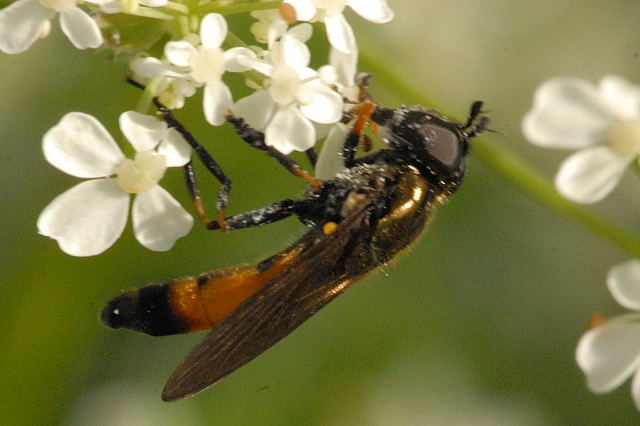

Scientific classification
- Kingdom: Animalia
- Phylum: Arthropoda
- Clade: Pancrustacea
- Class: Insecta
- Order: Diptera
- Family: Syrphidae
- Genus: Platycheirus
- Species: P. granditarsus

Binomial name
- Platycheirus granditarsus (Forster, 1771)

Synonyms
- Musca confusa Harris, 1780; Musca granditarsa Forster, 1771; Platycheirus confusus (Harris, 1780); Platycheirus ocymi (Fabricius, 1794); Pyrophaena granditarsa (Forster, 1771); Syrphus ocymi] Fabricius, 1794

= Platycheirus granditarsus =

Species of fly

Platycheirus granditarsus, the hornhand sedgesitter, is a species of hoverfly. It is found in many parts of Britain North America and Europe. Typical habitat includes marshy meadows and ditches, where it can be found between May and October, though it is at its commonest between July and September. The most distinctive feature of this fly is the red-orange abdomen most easily seen as it takes off or alights.

== Description ==
For terminology Speight key to genera and glossary

Size

7.7–10.5 mm (0.30–0.41 in)

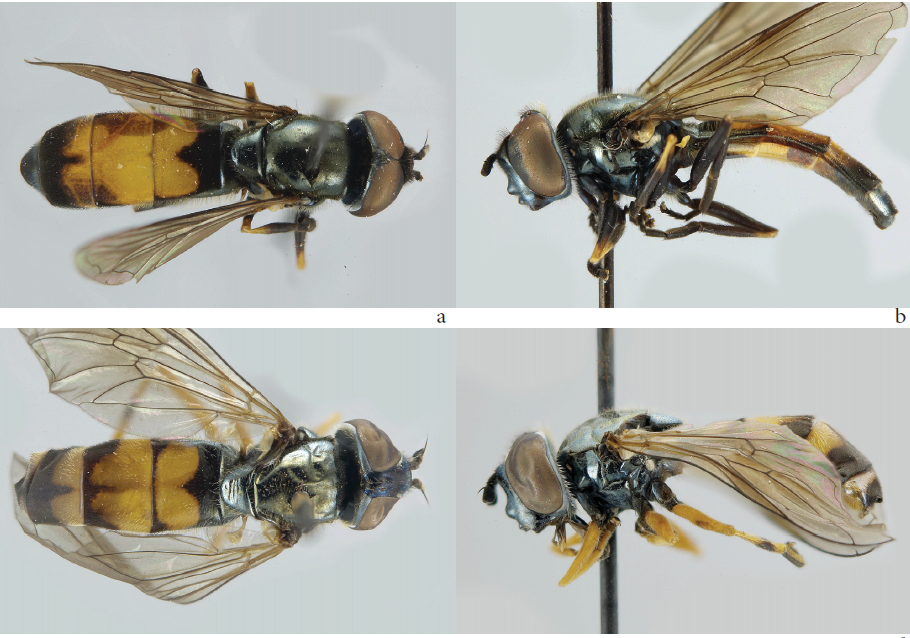
P. granditarsus male above Young

Head

The face is nearly vertical and the anterior oral margin is produced forward. It is shining, with silver pollinosity present only at lateral edges. The tubercle is somewhat large and abruptly pointed. The vertex is narrow, approximately two times as wide as the ocellar triangle. The antenna is black.

Thorax

The thorax is shining to subshining black and the pile is white or pale yellow. The longest scutellar pile is approximately equal in length to the arista, while other thoracic pile is half as long.

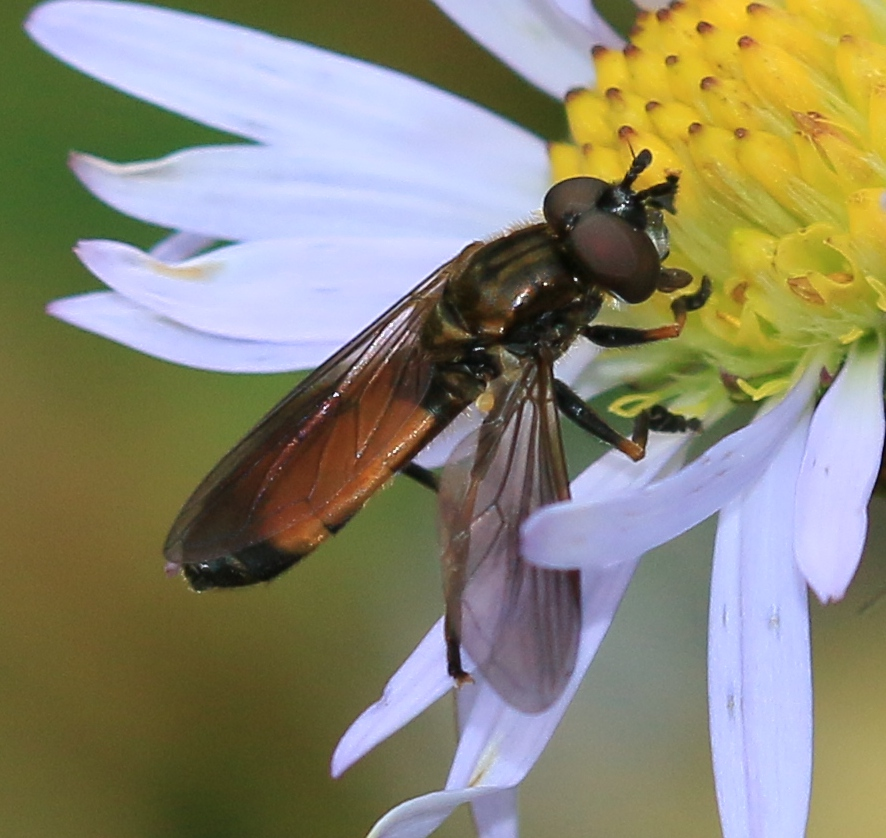
P. granditarsis male S. Rae

Abdomen

For male specimens, the abdomen is oval, with extensive orange areas. Segment 2 usually has only the anterior and lateral edges black, sometimes with a median black line. Segment 3 has only posterolateral edges black, while segment 4 usually has a basal half that is black, occasionally with a median black line that divides the orange anterior half of the segment into two large spots. Segment 5 is dark and unmarked. The surstylus has a poorly developed basal process. external images

For female specimens, the abdomen is broadly oval, with orange areas similar to males. Segment 2 usually has all edges black, sometimes with a median black line. Segment 3 has a complete posterior black band and sometimes also a median black band that divides the orange area into two spots. Segment 4 usually has a basal half that is black, often with a median black line that divides the orange anterior half of the segment into two large spots. Segment 5 has anterior orange spots.

Wings

The wing is darkened, entirely microtrichose.

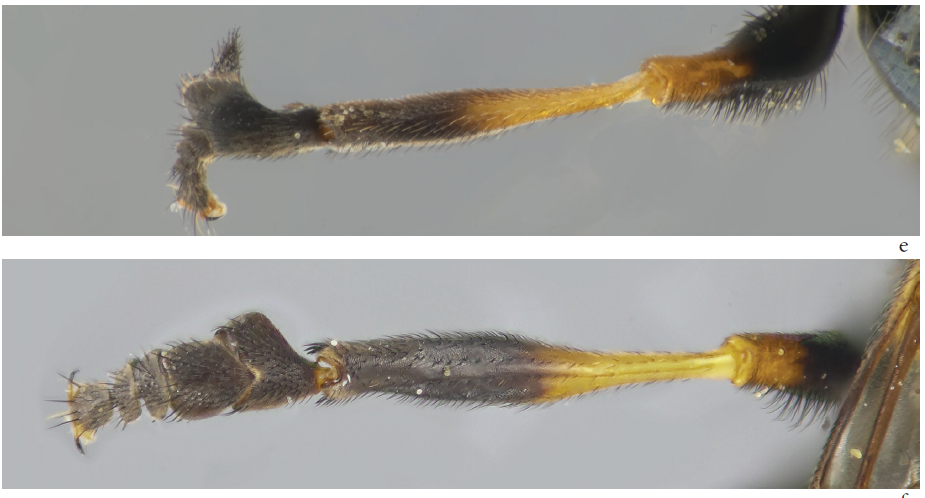
P.granditarsus legs male above, Young

Legs

The legs are mostly dark, with broad apices of femora and bases of tibiae pale. The fore femur has short, stiff black setae spaced irregularly on the anteroventral and posteroventral surface. The first fore tarsomere has a large, anterior triangular process on the apical half. The first 4 tarsomeres of the mid leg are strongly flattened, each with a broad, apically rounded process which are progressively shorter from the first to third tarsomere. External images

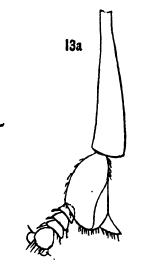
P. granditarsus front leg male, Williston

General Anatomy click to enlarge

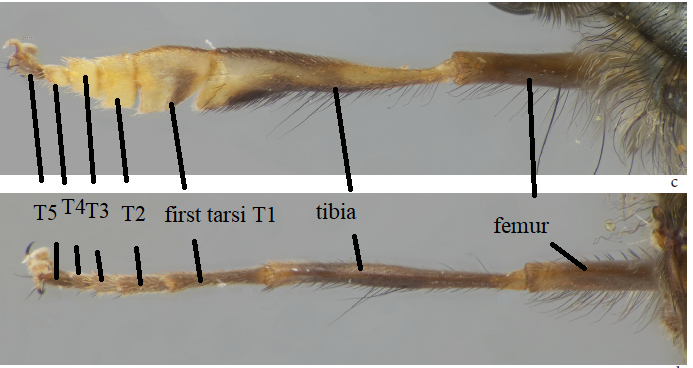
Legs

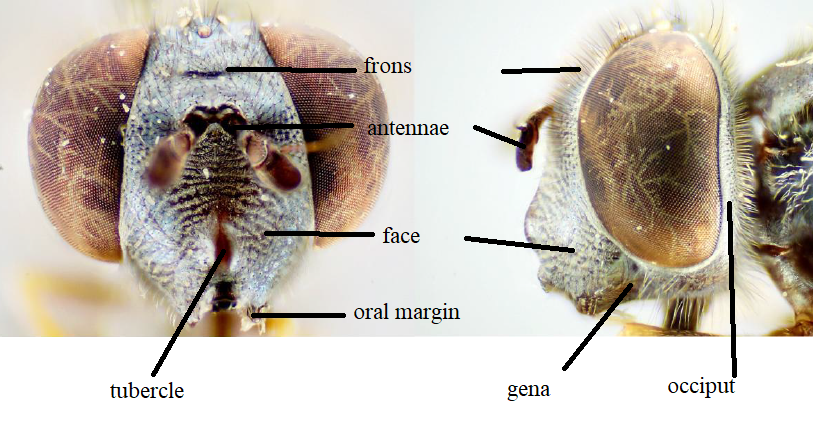
Head

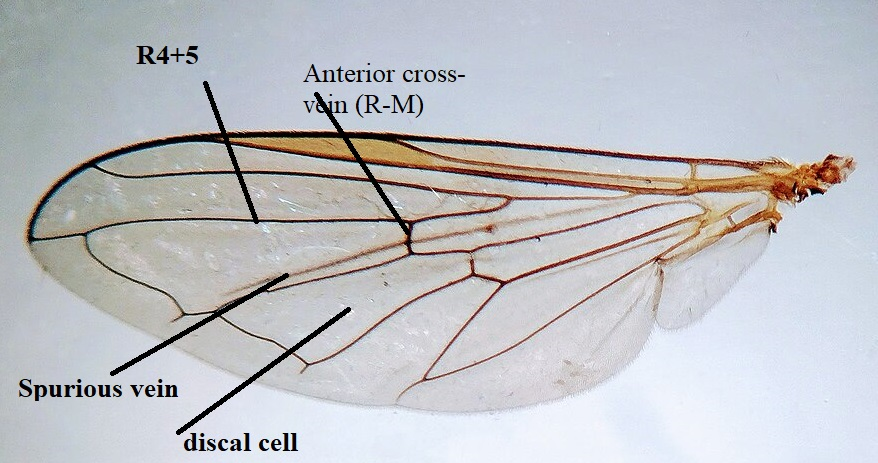
Wing

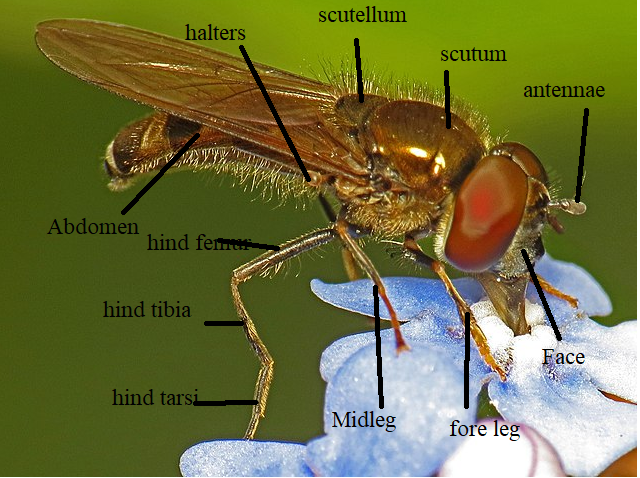
Body

See references for determination.

== Distribution ==
Palearctic: Fennoscandia south to France and the Alps, Ireland east through Northern Europe and Central Europe into European Russia then across Siberia and the Russian Far East to the Pacific coast. Nearctic: Alaska to Quebec and south to Colorado.

== Biology ==
Habitat: humid grassland subject to flooding, marsh, fen, edges of raised bogs. Flies May to September. Larva have not described. It flies May to August.
