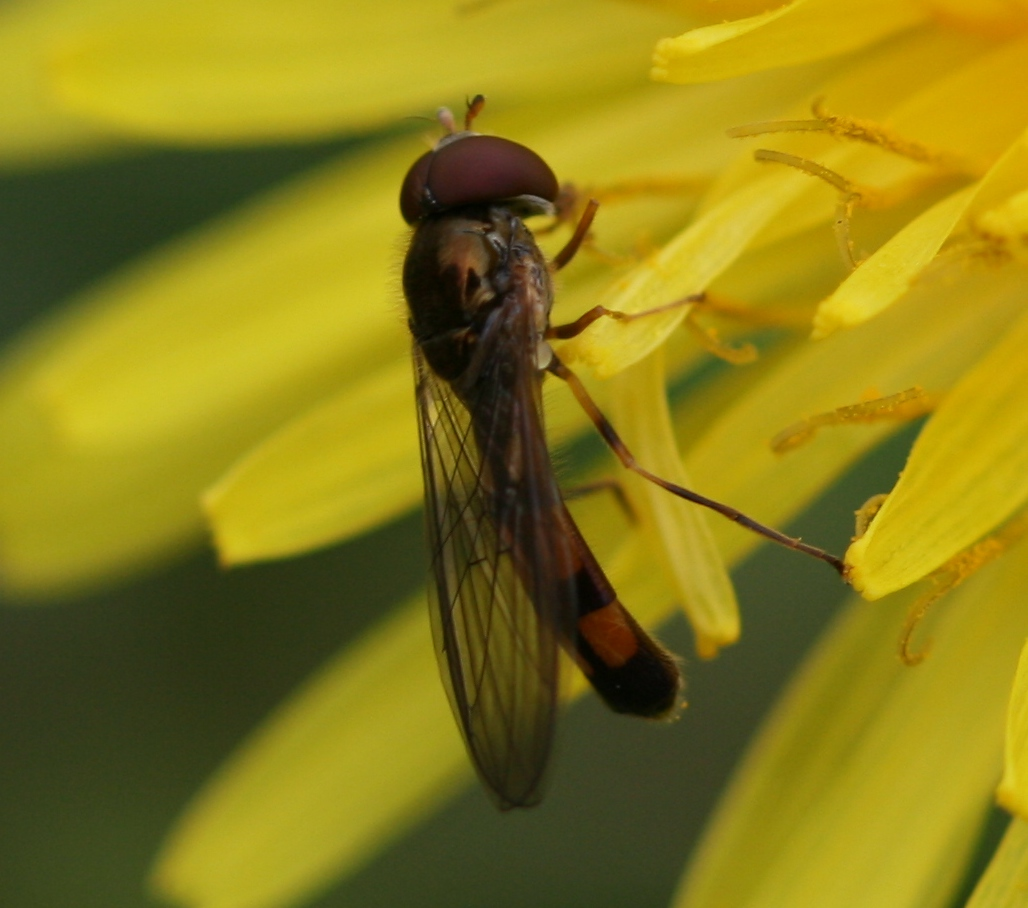
- Male
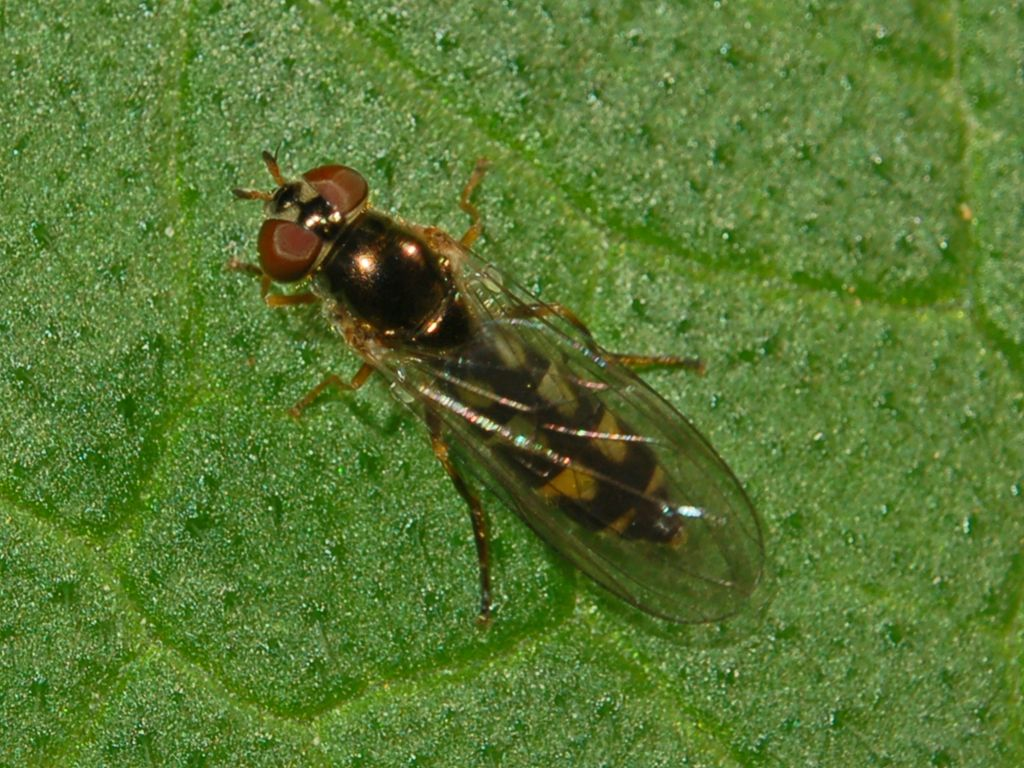
- Female

Scientific classification
- Kingdom: Animalia
- Phylum: Arthropoda
- Class: Insecta
- Order: Diptera
- Family: Syrphidae
- Genus: Melanostoma
- Species: M. scalare

Binomial name
- Melanostoma scalare (Fabricius, 1794)

Synonyms
- Syrphus scalare Fabricius, 1794; Melanostoma ceylonense Meijere, 1911; Syrphus maculosus Meigen, 1822; Syrphus gracilis Meigen, 1822

= Melanostoma scalare =

Species of fly

Melanostoma scalare, the chequered hoverfly, is a very common species of hoverfly.

== Taxonomy ==
The European Melanostoma species are not well understood at present. Van der Goot is the most certain identification work. The male genitalia of M. scalare are figured by Dusek and Laska (1967). Other, more accessible, works are listed below.

== Distribution ==
This species is present in most of Europe, the Near East, North Africa, and the eastern parts of the Afrotropical realm south to Zimbabwe and throughout the Indomalayan realm to New Guinea.

== Description ==
Melanostoma scalare can reach a length of 7–10 mm (0.28–0.39 in). These hoverflies have a shining black thorax. The males are longer and slimmer than the females. Also, the male's abdomen is much thinner than that of the female. Further, the yellow markings of the male are roundish or diamond-shaped, while those of the female are triangular patches.

== Biology ==
Little is known of its biology, but it is suspected to be general predator of small insects in leaf litter. Adults fly from April to November and inhabit gardens, meadows, and flowering bushes where they feed. The larvae are aphidiphagous.

== Gallery ==
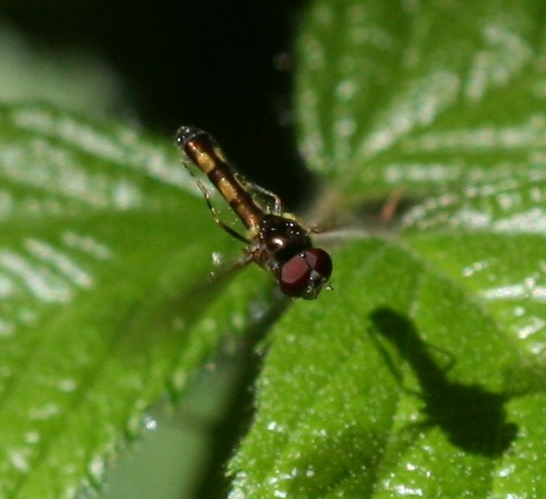
Male hovering

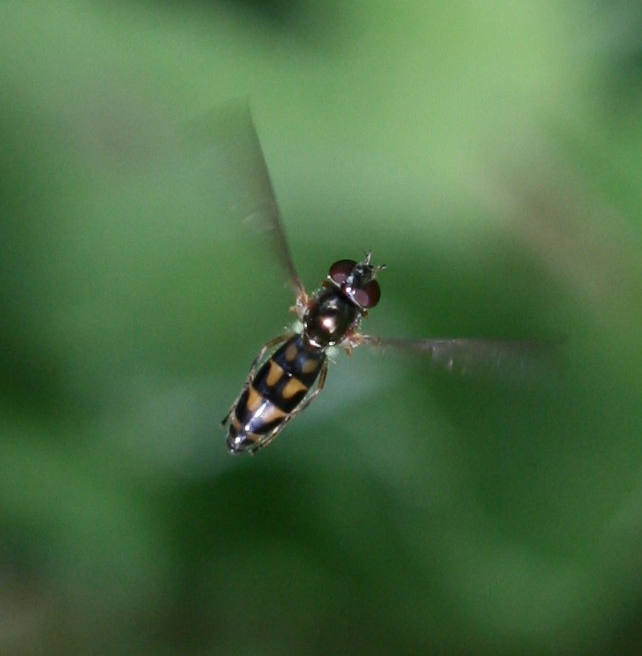
Female hovering

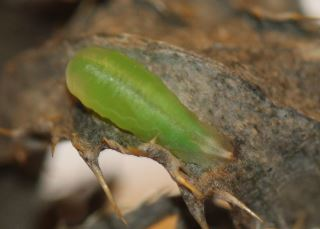
Pupa

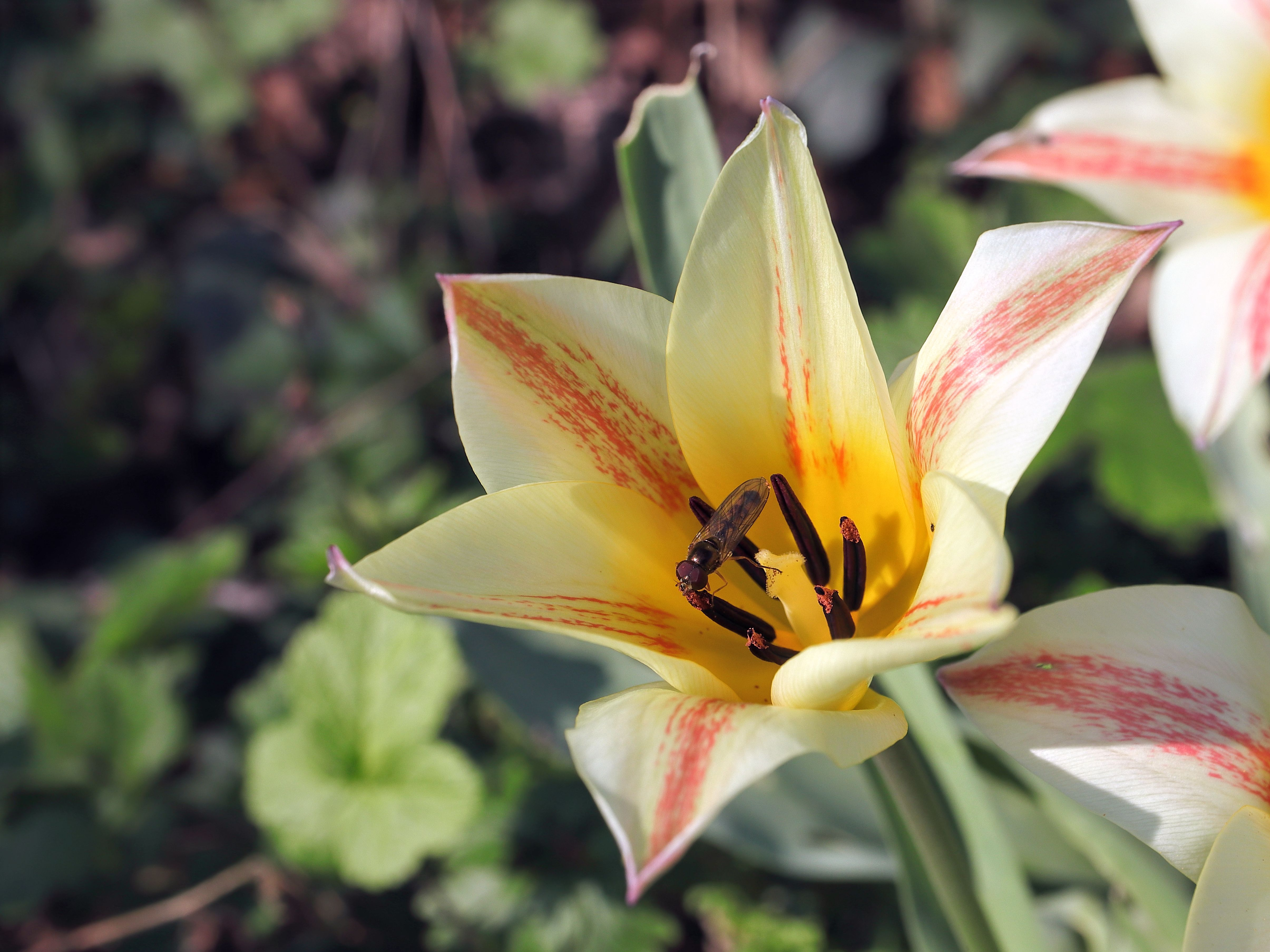
Melanostoma scalare feeding on a tulip
