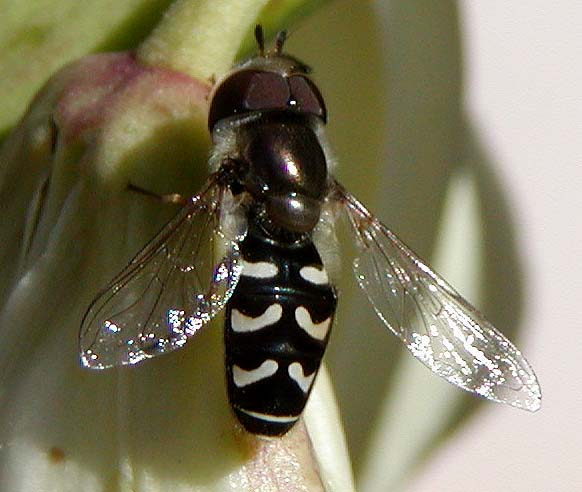
- Male Scaeva pyrastri

Scientific classification
- Kingdom: Animalia
- Phylum: Arthropoda
- Clade: Pancrustacea
- Class: Insecta
- Order: Diptera
- Family: Syrphidae
- Subfamily: Syrphinae; Leach, 1815

Tribes
- Bacchini; Melanostomini; Syrphini

= Syrphinae =

Subfamily of flies

The Syrphinae constitute one of the three subfamilies of the fly family Syrphidae. Most larvae of this subfamily feed on aphids. It is a monophyletic group with more than 1,600 species.

== Gallery ==
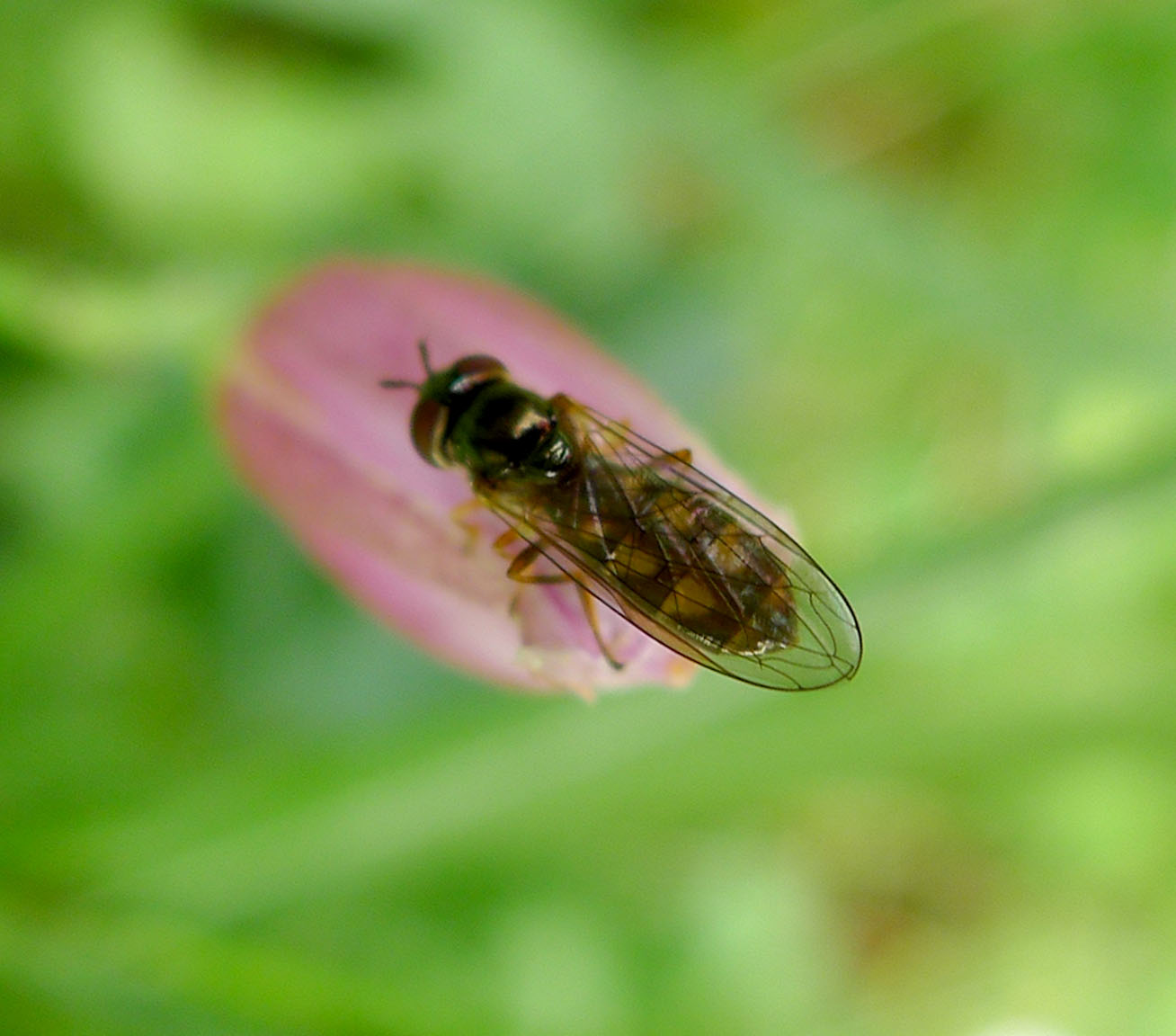
Melanostoma sp.

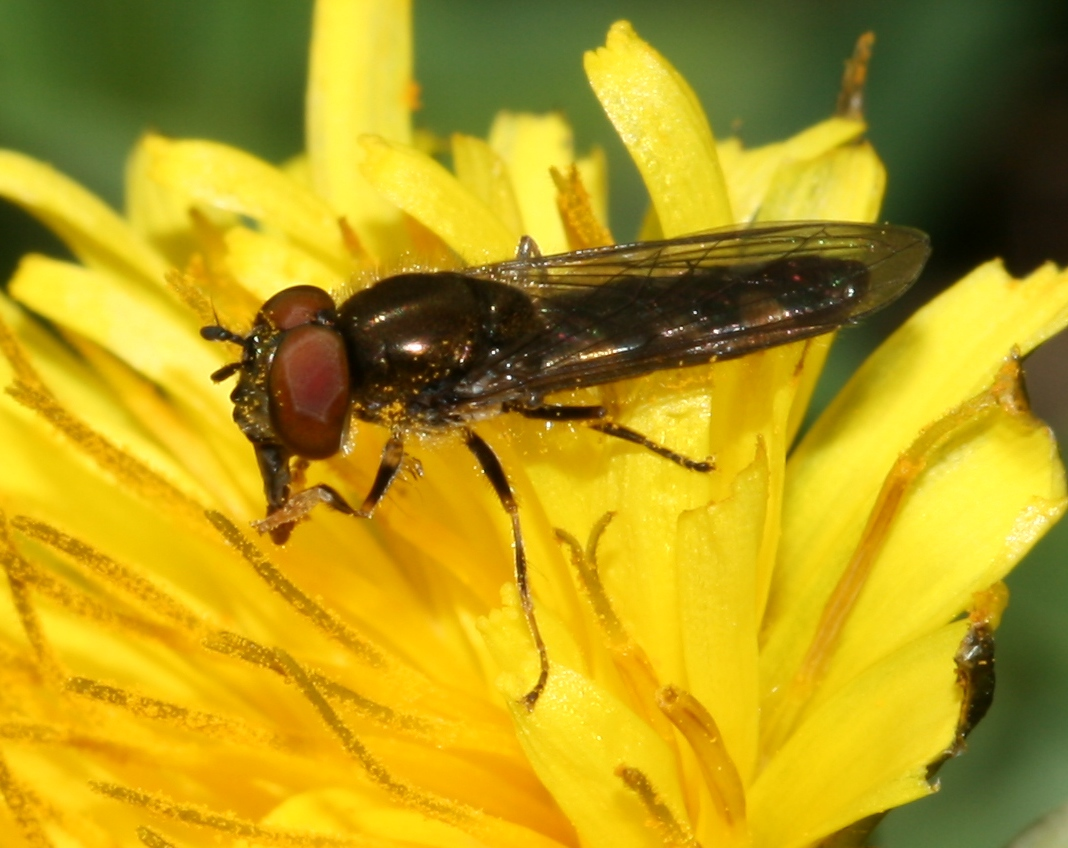
Platycheirus albimanus (male)

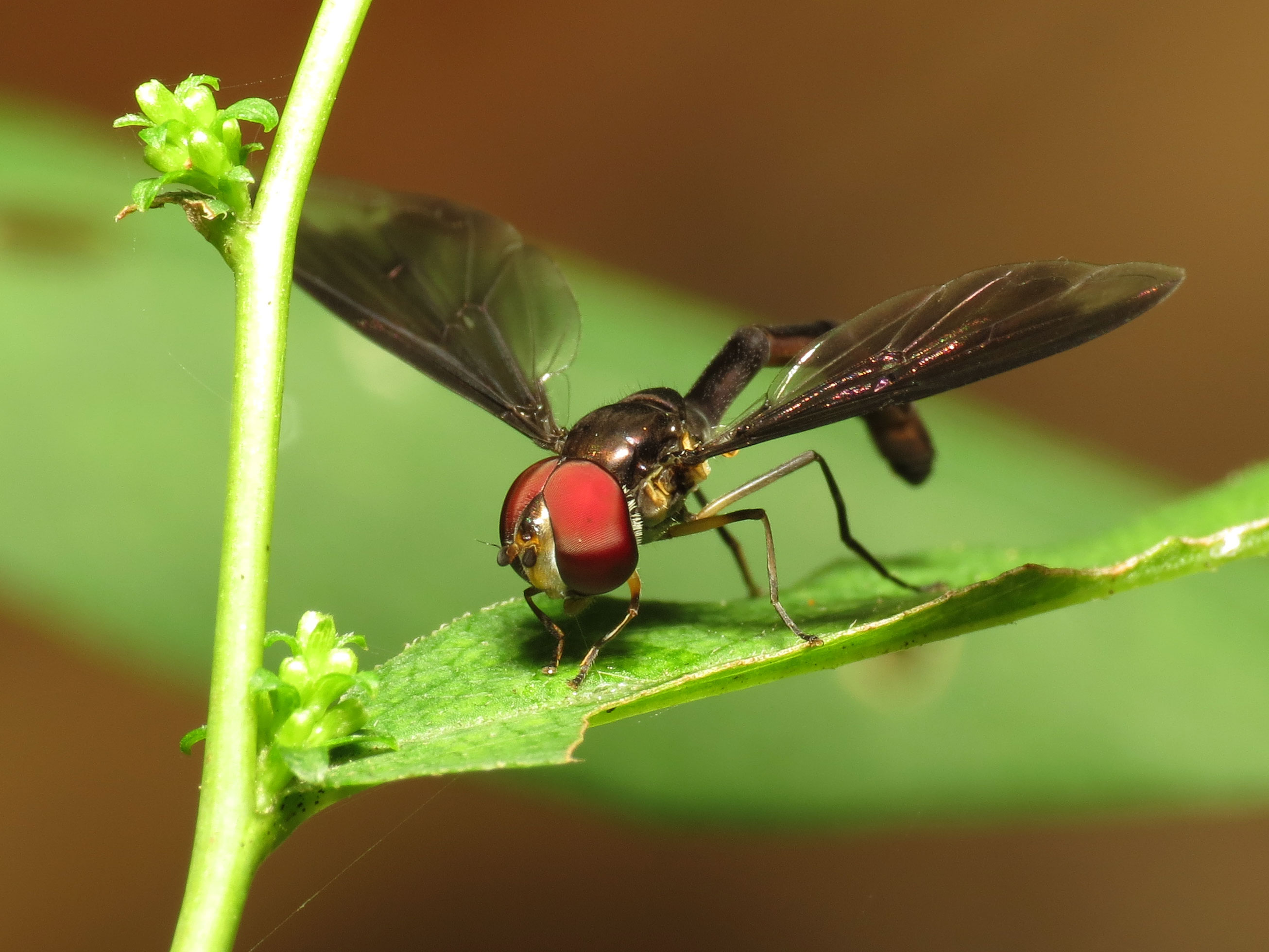
Ocyptamus fuscipennis

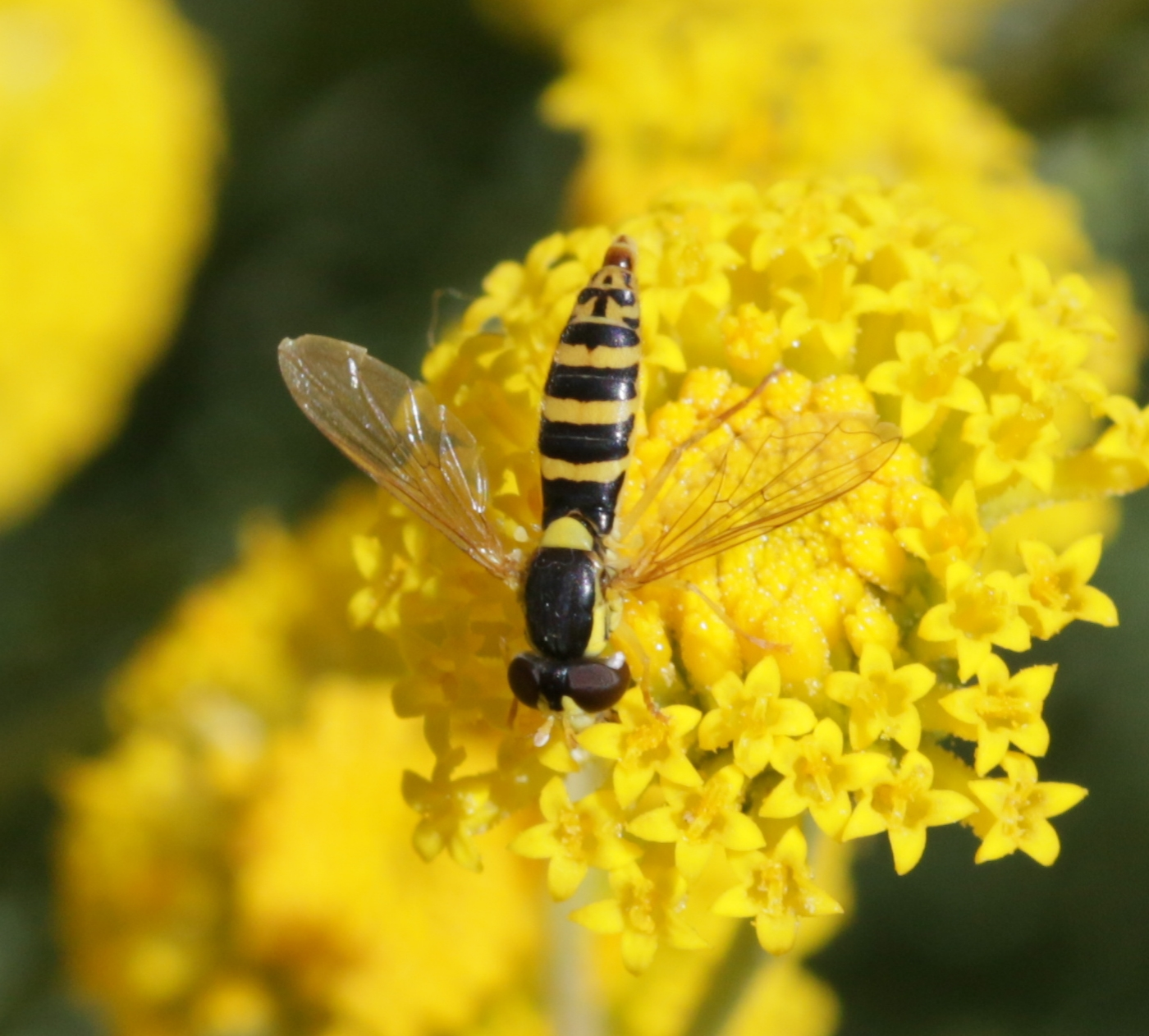
Sphaerophoria sp. (female)

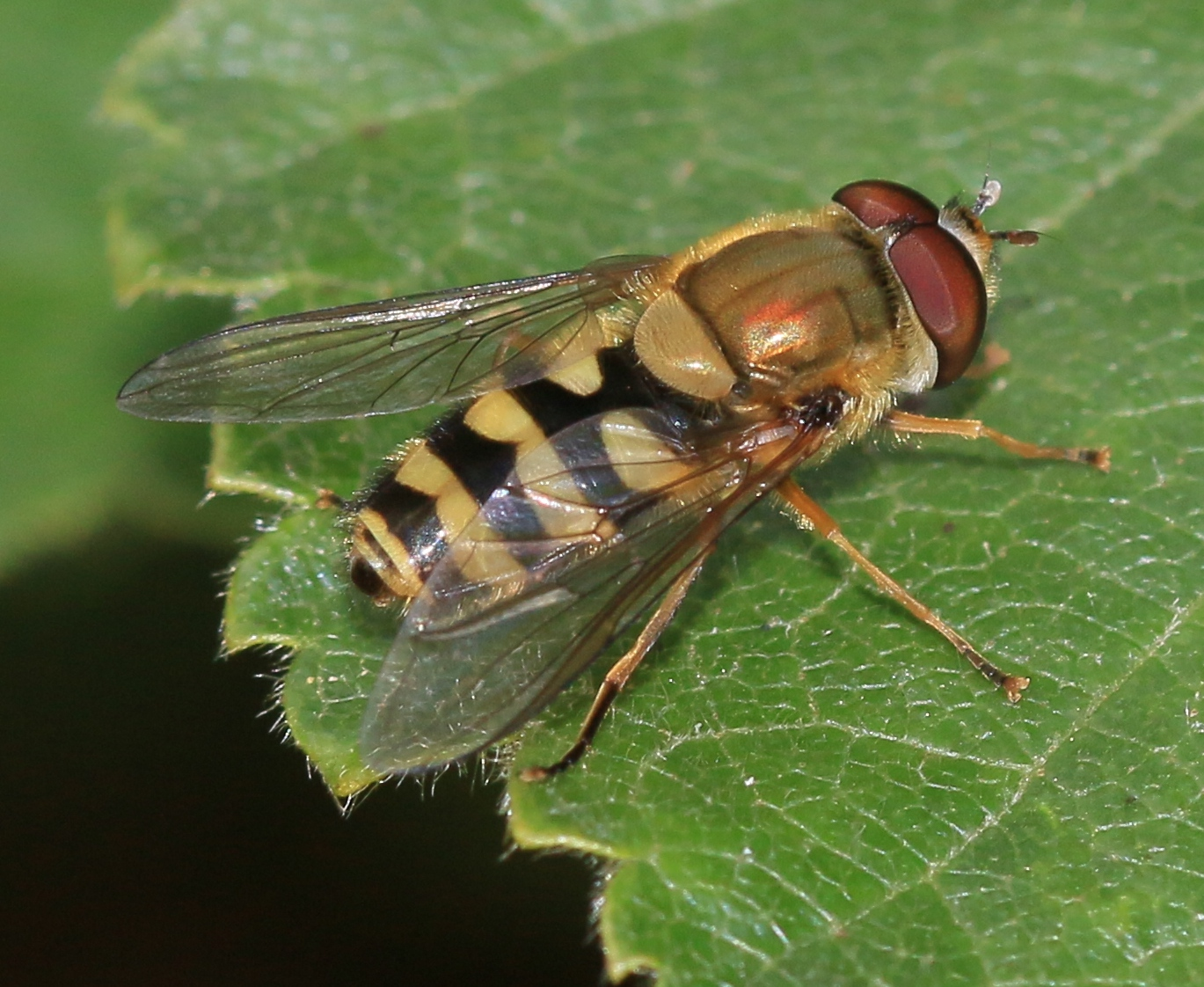
Syrphus sp. (male)

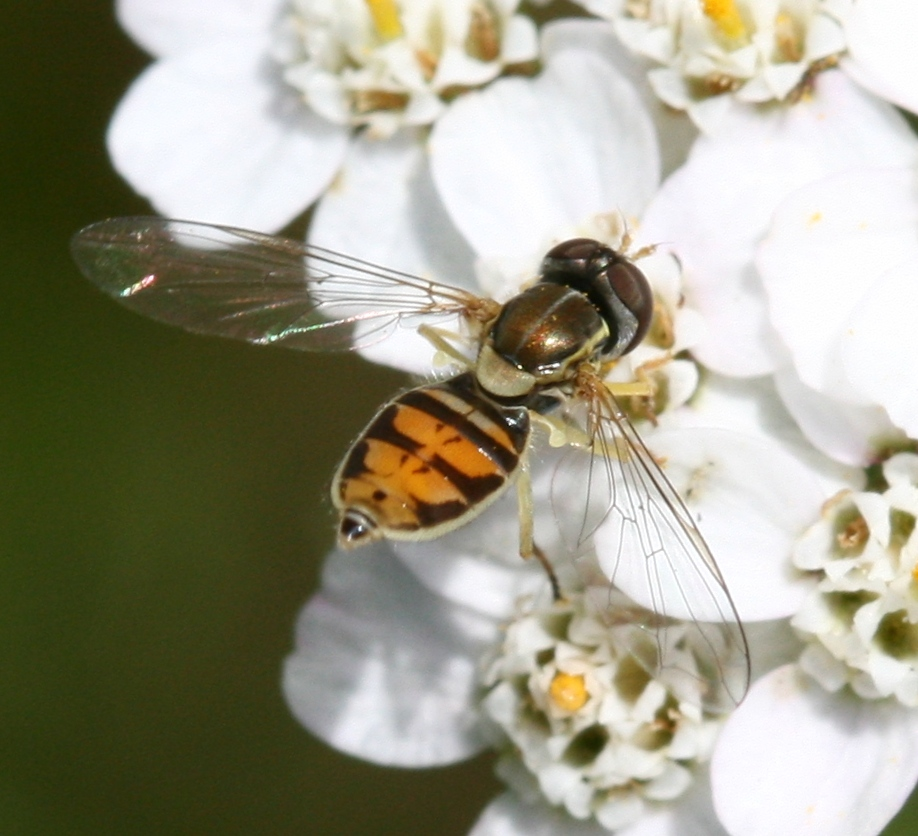
Toxomerus marginatus

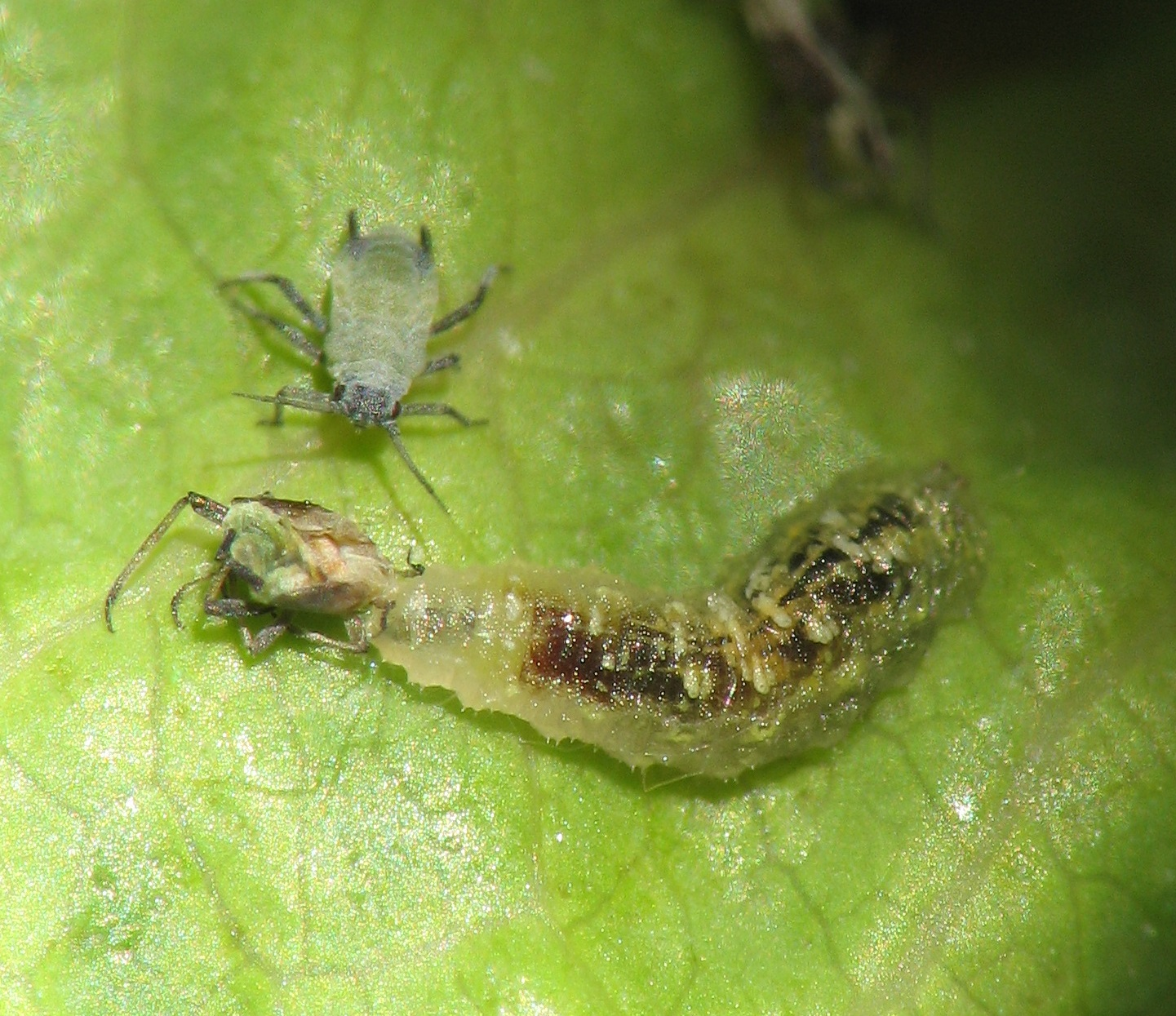
Larva of Syrphus sp. feeding on aphids

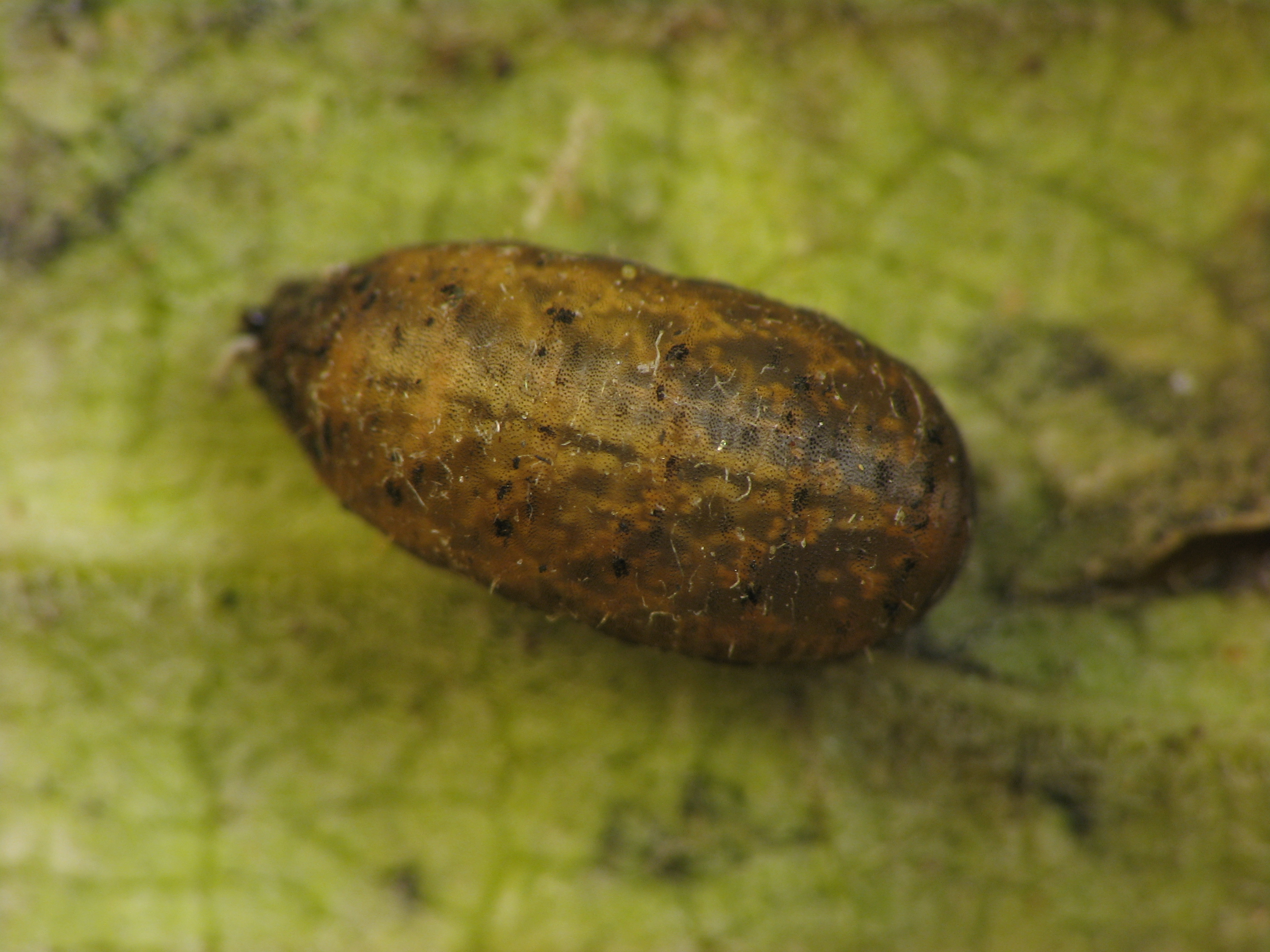
Puparium of Eupeodes americanus
