= List of Ocyptamus species =

This is a list of species in Ocyptamus, a genus of syrphid flies in the family Syrphidae.

== Ocyptamus species ==
- O. abata (Curran, 1938)^{c g}
- O. ada (Curran, 1941)^{c g}
- O. adspersus (Fabricius, 1805)^{c g}
- O. aeneus (Williston, 1891)^{c g}
- O. aeolus (Hull, 1943)^{c}
- O. amabilis (Hull, 1943)^{c g}
- O. anona (Hull, 1943)^{c g}
- O. anthinone (Hull, 1949)^{c g}
- O. antiphates (Walker, 1849)^{i c g b}
- O. arabella (Hull, 1947)^{c g}
- O. arethusa (Hull, 1949)^{c}
- O. argentinus (Curran, 1939)^{c g}
- O. ariela (Hull, 1944)^{c g}
- O. aster (Curran, 1941)^{c}
- O. attenuatus (Williston, 1891)^{c g}
- O. aurora (Hull, 1943)^{c g}
- O. banksi (Hull, 1941)^{c g}
- O. bassleri (Curran, 1939)^{c}
- O. bonariensis (Brethes, 1905)^{c g}
- O. braziliensis (Curran, 1939)^{c g}
- O. brevipennis (Schiner, 1868)^{c g}
- O. bromleyi (Curran, 1929)^{c g}
- O. calla (Curran, 1941)^{c g}
- O. callidus (Hine, 1914)^{c g}
- O. capitatus (Loew, 1863)^{c g}
- O. cecrops (Hull, 1958)^{c g}
- O. chapadensis (Curran, 1930)^{c g}
- O. colombianus (Curran, 1941)^{c g}
- O. confusus (Goot, 1964)^{c g}
- O. conjunctus (Wiedemann, 1830)^{c g}
- O. cordelia (Hull, 1949)^{c g}
- O. coreopsis (Hull, 1944)^{c g}
- O. crassus (Walker, 1852)^{c g}
- O. crocatus (Austen, 1893)^{c g}
- O. croceus (Austen, 1893)^{c g}
- O. cubanus (Hull, 1943)^{i c g b}
- O. cultratus (Austen, 1893)^{c g}
- O. cultrinus (Curran, 1939)^{c g}
- O. cybele (Hull, 1947)^{c g}
- O. cyclops (Hull, 1947)^{c g}
- O. cylindricus (Fabricius, 1781)^{c g}
- O. cymbellina (Hull, 1944)^{c g}
- O. debasa (Curran, 1941)^{c g}
- O. deceptor (Curran, 1930)^{c g}
- O. delicatissimus (Hull, 1943)^{c g}
- O. diffusus (Curran, 1939)^{c g}
- O. dimidiatus Fabricius, 1781^{i c g}
- O. dryope (Hull, 1958)^{c g}
- O. eblis (Hull, 1943)^{c g}
- O. elnora (Shannon, 1927)^{c g}
- O. erebus (Hull, 1943)^{c g}
- O. exiguus (Williston, 1888)^{c g}
- O. fasciatus Roeder, 1885^{c g}
- O. fascipennis (Wiedemann, 1830)^{c g b}
- O. ferrugineus Thompson, 1981^{c g}
- O. fervidus (Austen, 1893)^{c g}
- O. fiametta (Hull, 1943)^{c g}
- O. filii (Doesburg, 1966)^{c g}
- O. filiola (Shannon, 1927)^{c g}
- O. filissimus (Hull, 1943)^{c g}
- O. flavens (Austen, 1893)^{c g}
- O. flukiella (Curran, 1941)^{c g}
- O. funebris Macquart, 1834^{i c g}
- O. fuscicolor (Bigot, 1884)^{c g}
- O. fuscipennis (Macquart, 1834)^{i c g b}
- O. gastrostactus (Wiedemann, 1830)^{i c g}
- O. geijskesi (Doesburg, 1966)^{c}
- O. giganteus (Schiner, 1868)^{c g}
- O. gilvus (Austen, 1893)^{c g}
- O. globiceps (Hull, 1937)^{c g}
- O. gratus (Curran, 1941)^{c g}
- O. halcyone (Hull, 1949)^{c g}
- O. harlequinus (Hull, 1948)^{c}
- O. hippolyte (Hull, 1957)^{c g}
- O. hirtus (Shannon, 1927)^{c g}
- O. hyacinthia (Hull, 1947)^{c g}
- O. hyalipennis (Curran, 1930)^{c g}
- O. immaculatus (Macquart, 1842)^{c g}
- O. inca (Curran, 1939)^{c g}
- O. infanta (Hull, 1943)^{c g}
- O. infuscatus Bigot, 1884^{c g}
- O. inornatus (Walker, 1836)^{c g}
- O. io (Hull, 1944)^{c g}
- O. iona (Curran, 1941)^{c g}
- O. iris (Austen, 1893)^{c g}
- O. isthmus Thompson, 1976^{c g}
- O. johnsoni (Curran, 1934)^{c g}
- O. laudabilis (Williston, 1891)^{c g}
- O. lemur (Osten Sacken, 1877)^{i c g b}
- O. lepidus (Macquart, 1842)^{c g}
- O. leucopodus (Hull, 1948)^{c g}
- O. levissimus (Austen, 1893)^{c g}
- O. limpidapex (Curran, 1941)^{c g}
- O. lucretia (Hull, 1949)^{c g}
- O. luctuosus (Bigot, 1884)^{c g}
- O. lugubris (Philippi, 1865)^{c g}
- O. macer (Curran, 1930)^{c g}
- O. mara (Curran, 1941)^{c g}
- O. martorelli (Telford, 1973)^{c g}
- O. medina (Telford, 1973)^{c g}
- O. melanorrhinus (Philippi, 1865)^{c g}
- O. mentor (Curran, 1930)^{c g}
- O. micropelecinus (Shannon, 1927)^{c g}
- O. micropyga (Curran, 1941)^{c g}
- O. mima (Hull, 1949)^{c g}
- O. minimus (Hull, 1943)^{c g}
- O. murinus (Curran, 1930)^{c g}
- O. nasutus (Williston, 1891)^{c g}
- O. neoparvicornis (Telford, 1973)^{c g}
- O. neptunus (Hull, 1943)^{c g}
- O. nerissa (Hull, 1943)^{c g}
- O. nero (Curran, 1939)^{c g}
- O. neuralis (Curran, 1934)^{c g}
- O. nigrocilia (Hull, 1943)^{c g}
- O. niobe (Hull, 1943)^{c g}
- O. nitidulus (Curran, 1930)^{c}
- O. nora (Curran, 1941)^{c g}
- O. nymphaea (Hull, 1943)^{c g}
- O. obliquus (Curran, 1941)^{c g}
- O. oblongus (Walker, 1852)^{c g}
- O. octomaculatus Thompson, 1976^{c g}
- O. oenone (Hull, 1949)^{c g}
- O. oriel (Hull, 1942)^{c g}
- O. ornatipes (Curran, 1927)^{c g}
- O. oviphorus (Hull, 1943)^{c g}
- O. ovipositorius (Hull, 1943)^{c g}
- O. panamensis (Curran, 1930)^{c g}
- O. pandora (Hull, 1942)^{c g}
- O. papilionarius (Hull, 1943)^{c g}
- O. para (Curran, 1941)^{c g}
- O. parvicornis (Loew, 1861)^{i c g b}
- O. peri (Hull, 1943)^{c g}
- O. philippianus (Enderlein, 1938)^{c g}
- O. philodice (Hull, 1950)^{c g}
- O. plutonia (Hull, 1948)^{c g}
- O. pola (Curran, 1939)^{c g}
- O. potentilla (Hull, 1942)^{c g}
- O. prenes (Curran, 1930)^{c g}
- O. princeps (Hull, 1944)^{c g}
- O. provocans (Curran, 1939)^{c g}
- O. prudens (Curran, 1934)^{c g}
- O. pullus (Sack, 1921)^{c g}
- O. pumilus (Austen, 1893)^{c g}
- O. punctifrons (Williston, 1891)^{c g}
- O. pyxia (Hull, 1943)^{c g}
- O. rugosifrons (Schiner, 1868)^{c g}
- O. saffrona (Hull, 1943)^{c g}
- O. sagittiferus (Austen, 1893)^{c g}
- O. salpa (Hull, 1944)^{c g}
- O. sappho (Hull, 1943)^{c g}
- O. sargoides (Macquart, 1850)^{c g}
- O. sativus (Curran, 1941)^{c g}
- O. satyrus (Hull, 1943)^{c g}
- O. schwarzi (Curran, 1939)^{c g}
- O. scintillans (Hull, 1943)^{c g}
- O. selene (Hull, 1949)^{c g}
- O. shropshirei (Curran, 1930)^{c g}
- O. signiferus (Austen, 1893)^{c g}
- O. simulatus (Curran, 1939)^{c g}
- O. smarti (Curran, 1939)^{c g}
- O. spatulatus (Giglio-Tos, 1892)^{c g}
- O. stenogaster (Williston, 1888)^{c}
- O. stipa (Hull, 1949)^{c g}
- O. stolo (Walker, 1852)^{c g}
- O. striatus (Walker, 1852)^{c g}
- O. subchalybeus (Walker, 1857)^{c g}
- O. summus (Fluke, 1936)^{c g}
- O. susio (Hull, 1941)^{c g}
- O. tarsalis (Walker, 1836)^{c g}
- O. tenuis (Walker, 1852)^{c g}
- O. tiarella (Hull, 1944)^{c g}
- O. titania (Hull, 1943)^{c g}
- O. trilobus (Hull, 1944)^{c g}
- O. trinidadensis (Curran, 1939)^{c g}
- O. tristani Zumbado, 2000^{c g}
- O. urania (Hull, 1949)^{c g}
- O. vanda (Hull, 1943)^{c g}
- O. vanessa (Hull, 1949)^{c}
- O. variegatus (Macquart, 1842)^{c g}
- O. vera (Hull, 1943)^{c g}
- O. verona (Curran, 1941)^{c g}
- O. victoria (Hull, 1941)^{c g}
- O. vierecki (Curran, 1930)^{c g}
- O. virgilio (Hull, 1942)^{c g}
- O. wilhelmina (Doesburg, 1962)^{c g}
- O. willistoni Thompson, 1976^{c g}
- O. wulpianus (Lynch Arribalzaga, 1891)^{c g}
- O. xanthopterus (Wiedemann, 1830)^{c g}
- O. xantippe (Hull, 1949)^{c g}
- O. zenilla (Hull, 1943)^{c g}
- O. zenillia (Curran, 1941)^{c g}
- O. zephyreus (Hull, 1947)^{c g}
- O. zerene (Hull, 1949)^{c g}
- O. zeteki (Curran, 1930)^{c g}
- O. zilla (Hull, 1943)^{c g}
- O. zita (Curran, 1941)^{c g}
- O. zobeide (Hull, 1943)^{c g}
- O. zoroaster (Hull, 1943)^{c g}

Data sources: i = ITIS, c = Catalogue of Life, g = GBIF, b = Bugguide.net
