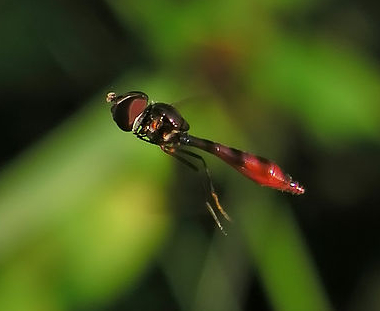
- Ocyptamus cf. fuscipennis

Scientific classification
- Kingdom: Animalia
- Phylum: Arthropoda
- Clade: Pancrustacea
- Class: Insecta
- Order: Diptera
- Family: Syrphidae
- Tribe: Syrphini
- Genus: Ocyptamus; Macquart, 1834

= Ocyptamus =

Genus of flies

Ocyptamus is a large and diverse genus of over 200 species of hoverfly mostly found in the Neotropical region. It is likely that many of these species will be discovered to be synonyms though many others await description.

== Classification ==
There is evidence that the genus is not monophyletic and is paraphyletic with regard to Eosalpingogaster and Toxomerus, and some subgenera have been given full generic status (Hybobathus, Pelecinobaccha, Orphnabaccha, and Pseudoscaeva).

=== Selected Species ===
Subgenus: Ocyptamus Macquart, 1834

- O. antiphates (Walker, 1849)
- O. calla (Curran, 1941)
- O. cylindricus (Fabricius, 1781)
- O. dimidiatus (Fabricius, 1781)
- O. fasciatus Roeder, 1885
- O. funebris Macquart, 1834
- O. fuscipennis (Say, 1823)
- O. gastrostactus (Wiedemann, 1830)
- O. icarus Reemer, 2010
- O. inca (Curran, 1939)
- O. infuscatus Bigot, 1884
- O. iris (Austen, 1893)
- O. medina (Telford, 1973)
- O. papilionarius (Hull, 1943)
- O. princeps (Hull, 1944)
- O. stolo (Walker, 1852)
- O. tarsalis (Walker, 1836)

Subgenus: Hermesomyia Vockeroth, 1969

- O. wulpianus (Lynch Arribalzaga, 1891)

Subgenus: Pipunculosyrphus Hull, 1937

- O. globiceps (Hull, 1937)
- O. scintillans (Hull, 1943)
- O. tiarella (Hull, 1944)

Subgenus: Mimocalla Hull, 1943

- O. bonariensis (Brethes, 1905)
- O. capitatus (Loew, 1863)
- O. conjunctus (Wiedemann, 1830)
- O. erebus (Hull, 1943)
- O. flata (Hull, 11940)
- O. giganteus (Schiner, 1868)
- O. nymphaea (Hull, 1943)
- O. sargoides (Macquart, 1850)
- O. tristani Zumbado, 2000
- O. willistoni Thompson, 1976

Subgenus: Styxia Hull, 1943

- O. ariela (Hull, 1944)
- O. eblis (Hull, 1943)

Subgenus: Calostigma Shannon, 1927

- O. coreopsis (Hull, 1944)
- O. elnora (Shannon, 1927)
- O. exiguus (Williston, 1888)
- O. ornatipes (Curran, 1927)
- O. striatus (Walker, 1852)

Subgenus: Atylobaccha Hull, 1949

- O. flukiella (Curran, 1941)

=== Proposed Genera ===
In 2020, five new genera were proposed for "orphaned" lineages within Ocyptamus, containing these species. The new genera are sometimes used for these species.

Genus Fragosa

- argentina (Curran, 1939)
- aurora (Hull, 1943)
- deceptor (Curran, 1930)
- filiola (Shannon, 1927)
- filissima (Hull, 1943)
- harlequina (Hull, 1948)
- hyacinthia (Hull, 1947)
- macer (Curran, 1930)
- mara (Curran, 1941)
- oenone (Hull, 1949)
- provocans (Curran, 1939)
- rugosifrons (Schiner, 1868)
- stenogaster (Williston, 1888)
- tenuis (Walker, 1852)
- titania (Hull, 1943)
- virgilio (Hull, 1942)
- zephyrea (Hull, 1947b)

Genus Hypocritanus

- fascipennis (Wiedemann, 1830)
- lemur (Osten Sacken, 1877)

Genus Maiana

- callida (Hine, 1914)
- pumila (Austen, 1893)

Genus Nuntianus

- abata (Curran, 1938)
- aeolus (Hull, 1943)
- anona (Hull, 1943)
- arabella (Hull, 1947)
- banksi (Hull, 1941)
- cecrops (Hull, 1958)
- chapadensis (Curran, 1930)
- confusus (Goot, 1964)
- crocatus (Austen, 1893)
- croceus (Austen, 1893)
- cubanus (Hull, 1943)
- cultratus (Austen, 1893)
- cymbellina (Hull, 1944)
- debasa (Curran, 1941)
- delicatissimus (Hull, 1943)
- dryope (Hull, 1958)
- fervidus (Austen, 1893)
- filii (Doesburg, 1966)
- flavens (Austen, 1893)
- geijskesi (Doesburg, 1966)
- gilvus (Austen, 1893)
- halcyone (Hull, 1949)
- hippolite (Hull, 1957)
- hyalipennis (Curran, 1930)
- inornatus (Walker, 1836)
- io (Hull, 1944)
- iona (Curran, 1941)
- lepidus (Macquart, 1842)
- lucretia (Hull, 1949)
- luctuosus (Bigot, 1884)
- micropyga (Curran, 1941)
- minimus (Hull, 1943)
- murinus (Curran, 1930)
- myiophagus (Thompson, 2018)
- neoparvicornis (Telford, 1973)
- neptunus (Hull, 1943)
- neuralis (Curran, 1934)
- niobe (Hull, 1943)
- nora (Curran, 1941)
- obliquus (Curran, 1941)
- octomaculatus (Thompson, 1976)
- oriel (Hull, 1942)
- panamensis (Curran, 1930)
- peri (Hull, 1943)
- philippianus (Enderlein, 1938)
- prenes (Curran, 1930)
- prudens (Curran, 1934)
- pullus (Sack, 1921)
- punctifrons (Williston, 1891)
- pyxia (Hull, 1943)
- saffrona (Hull, 1943)
- spatulatus (Giglio-Tos, 1892)
- vanessa (Hull, 1949)
- variegatus (Macquart, 1842)
- verona (Curran, 1941)
- victoria (Hull, 1941)
- vierecki (Curran, 1930)
- xanthopterus (Wiedemann, 1830)
- xantippe (Hull, 1949)
- zenillia (Curran, 1941)
- zita (Curran, 1941)
- zobeide (Hull, 1943)
- zoroaster (Hull, 1943)

Genus Victoriana

- attenuata (Williston, 1891)
- duida (Hull, 1947)
- ferruginea (Thompson, 1981)
- laudabilis (Williston, 1891)
- lugubris (Philippi, 1865)
- melanorrhina (Philippi, 1865)
- mentor (Curran, 1930)
- oblonga (Walker, 1852)
- parvicornis (Loew, 1861)
- sagittifera (Austen, 1893)
- sativa (Curran, 1941)
- selene (Hull, 1949)
- zilla (Hull, 1943)

== See also ==
- List of Ocyptamus species
