= Orphnabaccha =

Scientific classification
- Kingdom: Animalia
- Phylum: Arthropoda
- Class: Insecta
- Order: Diptera
- Family: Syrphidae
- Tribe: Syrphini
- Genus: Orphnabaccha; Vockeroth, 1969

Genus of flies

Orphnabaccha is a genus of hoverflies in the Neotropical region, formerly included in the genus Ocyptamus, which was split after researchers determined it was not monophyletic.

== Species ==
THe following species are recognised in the genus Orphnabaccha:

- O. aequilineata (Hull, 1945)
- O. agilis (Bigot, 1884)
- O. ampla (Fluke, 1942)
- O. calda (Walker, 1852)
- O. cerberus (Hull, 1943)
- O. coerulea (Williston, 1891)
- O. decipiens (Williston, 1891)
- O. delimbata (Enderlein, 1948)
- O. diversa (Williston, 1891)
- O. dolorosa (Hull, 1950)
- O. elegans (Giglio-Tos, 1892)
- O. erratica (Williston, 1888)
- O. flavigaster (Hull, 1944)
- O. fraterna (Bigot, 1884)
- O. fuscicosta (Lynch Arribalzaga, 1891)
- O. golbachi (Fluke, 1950)
- O. jactator (Loew, 1861)
- O. lanei (Fluke, 1950)
- O. laticauda (Curran, 1941)
- O. lativentris (Curran, 1941)
- O. lauta (Giglio-Tos, 1892)
- O. limba (Enderlein, 1938)
- O. nodosa (Hull, 1930)
- O. opaca (Fluke, 1950)
- O. priscilla (Hull, 1943)
- O. pteronis (Fluke, 1942)
- O. superba (Thompson, 1981)
- O. trabis (Fluke, 1942)
- O. tribinicincta (Enderlein, 1938)
- O. virga (Fluke, 1942)
- O. volcana (Fluke, 1942)
