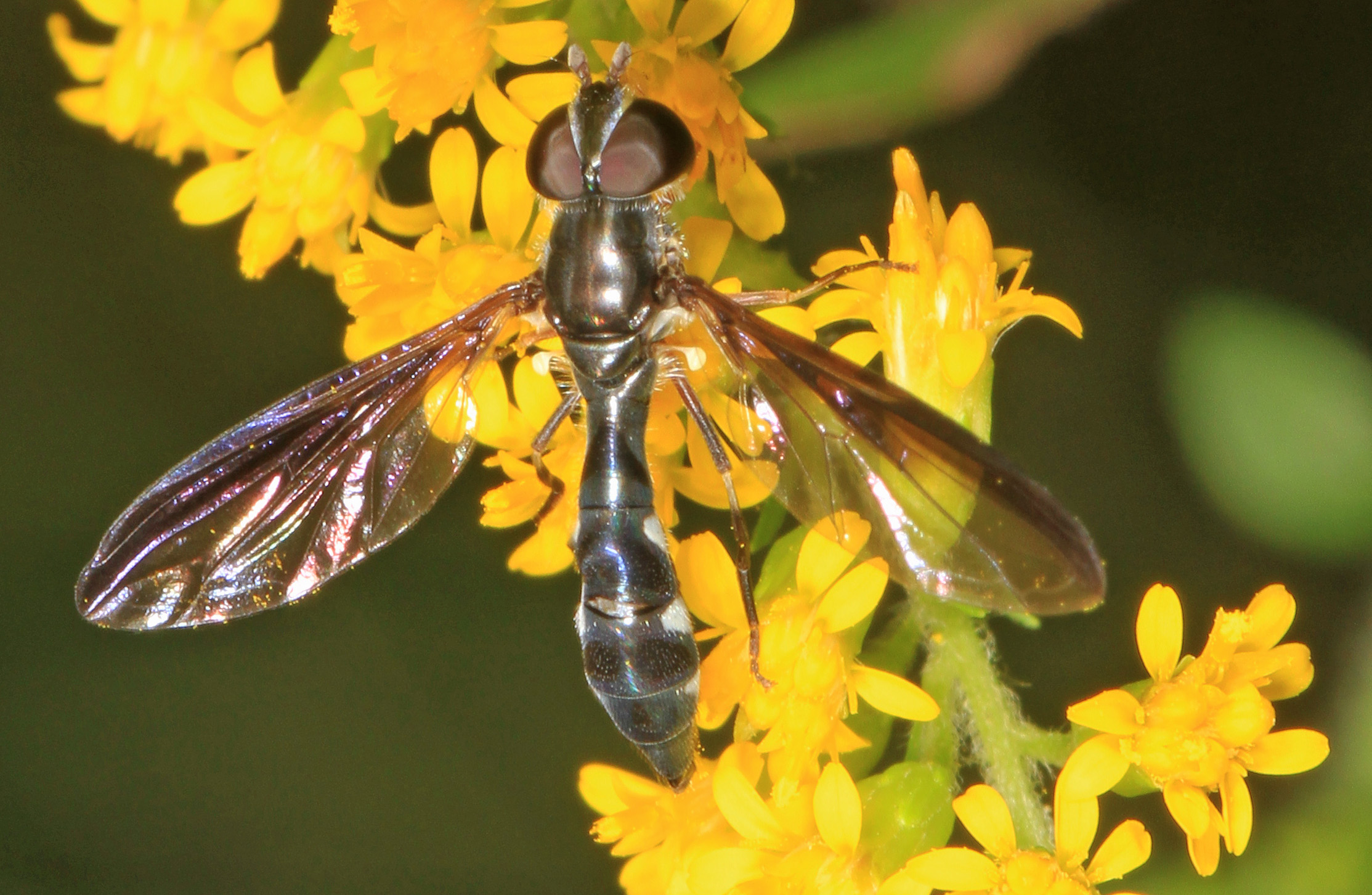

Scientific classification
- Kingdom: Animalia
- Phylum: Arthropoda
- Class: Insecta
- Order: Diptera
- Family: Syrphidae
- Genus: Pelecinobaccha
- Species: P. costata

Binomial name
- Pelecinobaccha costata (Say, 1829)

Synonyms
- Ocyptamus costatus (Say, 1829); Baccha costalis Wiedemann, 1830; Baccha costata Say, 1829; Baccha tarchetia Walker, 1849

= Pelecinobaccha costata =

Species of fly

Pelecinobaccha costata, the cobalt hover fly, is a species of fly in the family Syrphidae. It is distributed from southern Ontario and the east of the United States Of America.

The larvae are predators of scale insects.
