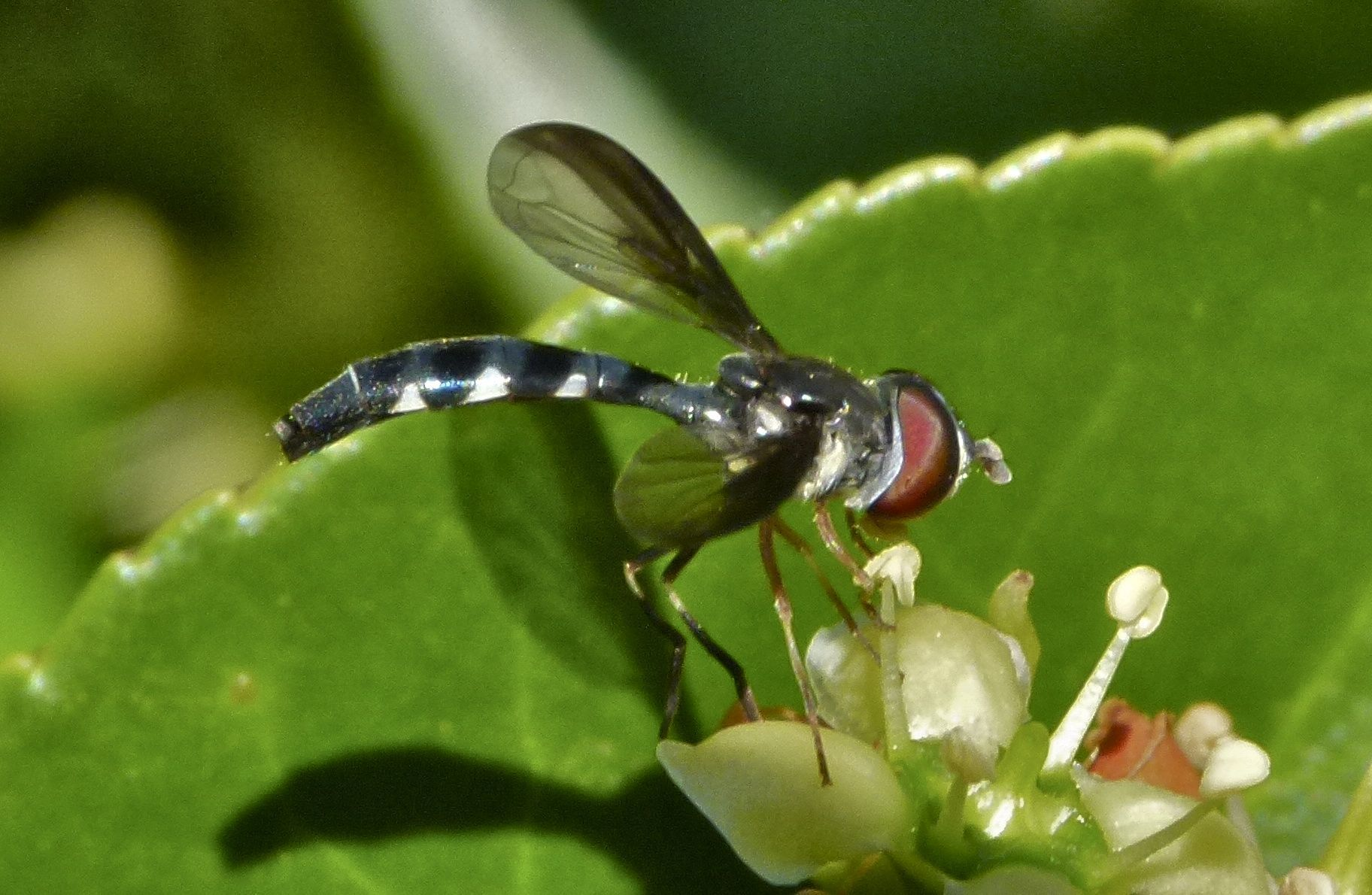
- Pelecinobaccha costata

Scientific classification
- Kingdom: Animalia
- Phylum: Arthropoda
- Class: Insecta
- Order: Diptera
- Family: Syrphidae
- Subfamily: Syrphinae
- Tribe: Syrphini
- Genus: Pelecinobaccha; Shannon, 1927

= Pelecinobaccha =

Genus of flies

Pelecinobaccha is a genus of hoverfly in the Neotropical region, formerly included in the genus Ocyptamus, which was split after researchers determined it was not monophyletic.

== Species ==
- Pelecinobaccha alicia (Curran, 1941)
- Pelecinobaccha beatricea (Hull, 1942)
- Pelecinobaccha clarapex (Wiedemann, 1830)
- Pelecinobaccha concinna (Williston, 1891)
- Pelecinobaccha cora (Curran, 1941)
- Pelecinobaccha costata (Say, 1829)
- Pelecinobaccha cryptica (Hull, 1942)
- Pelecinobaccha dracula (Hull, 1943)
- Pelecinobaccha eruptova (Hull, 1943)
- Pelecinobaccha hiantha (Hull, 1943)
- Pelecinobaccha hirundella (Hull, 1944)
- Pelecinobaccha ida (Curran, 1941)
- Pelecinobaccha mexicana (Curran, 1930)
- Pelecinobaccha peruviana Shannon, 1927
- Pelecinobaccha pilipes (Schiner, 1868)
- Pelecinobaccha telescopica (Curran, 1930)
- Pelecinobaccha transatlantica (Schiner, 1868)
- Pelecinobaccha tristis (Hull, 1930)
