= Pseudoscaeva =

Scientific classification
- Kingdom: Animalia
- Phylum: Arthropoda
- Class: Insecta
- Order: Diptera
- Family: Syrphidae
- Tribe: Syrphini
- Genus: Pseudoscaeva; Vockeroth, 1969

Genus of flies

Pseudoscaeva is a genus of hoverfly in the Neotropical region, formerly included in the genus Ocyptamus, which was split after researchers determined it was not monophyletic.

== Species ==
- P. diversifasciata (Knab, 1914)
- P. meridionalis (Fluke, 1950)
- P. schoenemanni (Enderlein, 1938)
- P. sericea (Walker, 1836)
