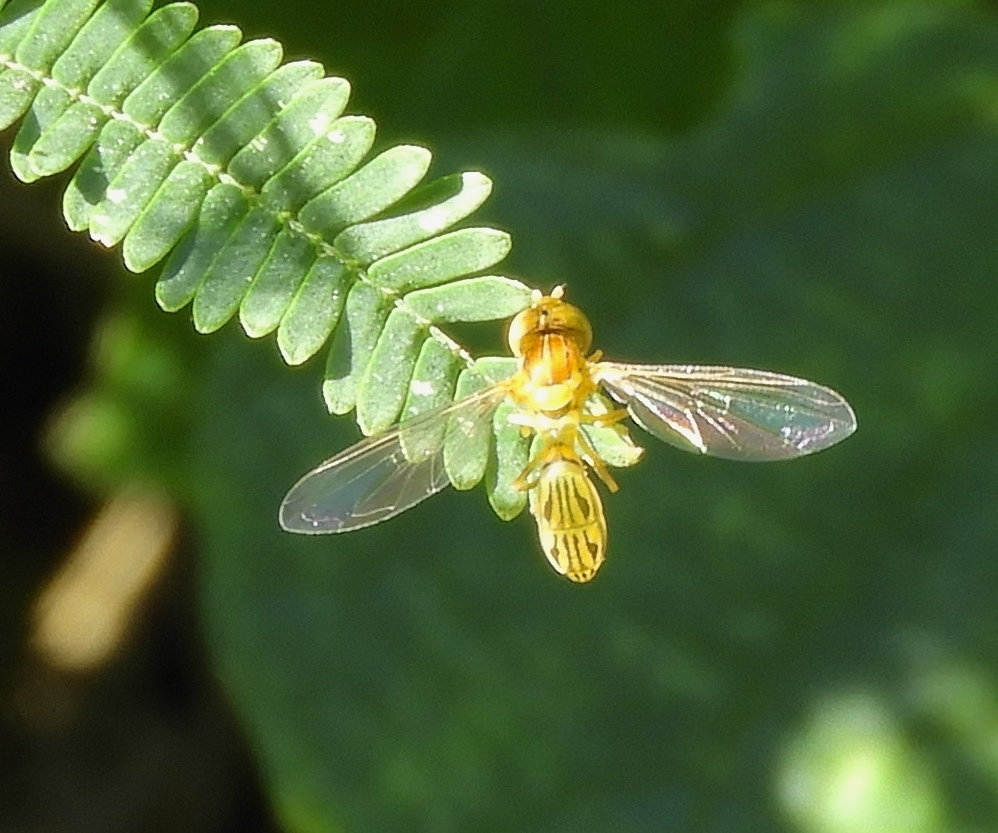
- Hybobathus sp.

Scientific classification
- Kingdom: Animalia
- Phylum: Arthropoda
- Clade: Pancrustacea
- Class: Insecta
- Order: Diptera
- Family: Syrphidae
- Tribe: Syrphini
- Genus: Hybobathus; Enderlein, 1937

= Hybobathus =

Genus of flies

Hybobathus is a genus of hoverfly in the Neotropical region, formerly included in the genus Ocyptamus, which was split after researchers determined it was not monophyletic.

== Species ==
- H. anera (Curran, 1939)
- H. arx (Fluke, 1936)
- H. bivittatus (Curran, 1941)
- H. cobboldia (Hull, 1958)
- H. cubensis (Macquart, 1850)
- H. druida (Hull, 1947)
- H. flavipennis (Wiedemann, 1830)
- H. idanus (Curran, 1941)
- H. lineatus (Macquart, 1846)
- H. lividus (Schiner, 1868)
- H. macropyga (Curran, 1941)
- H. myrtella (Hull, 1960)
- H. nectarinus (Hull, 1942)
- H. norina (Curran, 1941)
- H. notatus (Loew, 1866)
- H. obsoletus (Curran, 1941)
- H. pennatus (Hull, 1943)
- H. persimilis (Curran, 1930)
- H. phaeopterus (Schiner, 1868)
- H. placivus (Williston, 1888)
- H. quadrilineatus Enderlein, 1938
- H. rubricosus (Wiedemann, 1830)
- H. ryl (Hull, 1943)
- H. silaceus (Austen, 1893)
- H. thecla (Hull, 1943)
- H. vittiger (Hull, 1949)
- H. wiedemanni Enderlein, 1938
- H. zenia (Curran, 1941)
