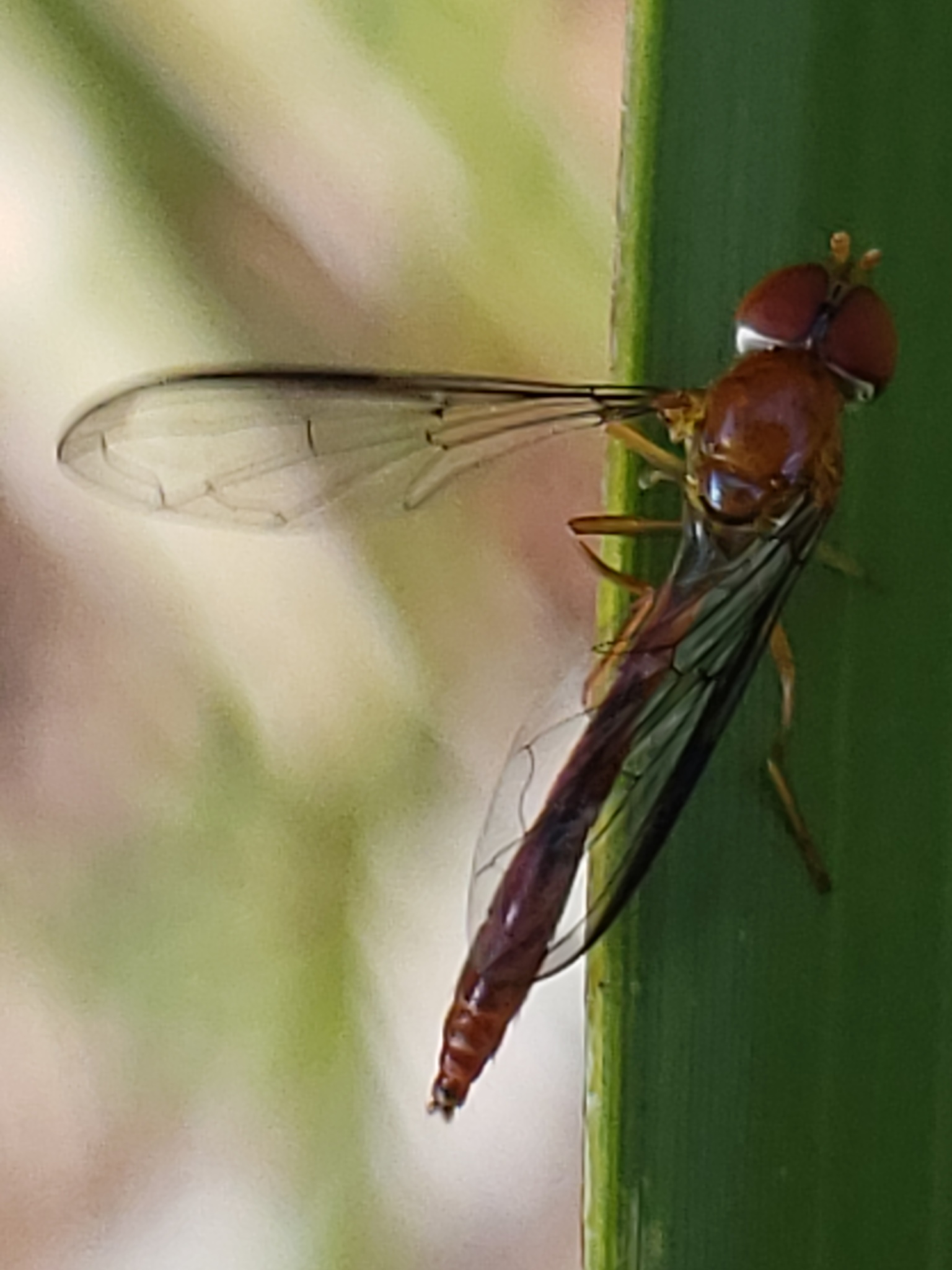
- Scarlet hover fly, Florida

Scientific classification
- Domain: Eukaryota
- Kingdom: Animalia
- Phylum: Arthropoda
- Class: Insecta
- Order: Diptera
- Family: Syrphidae
- Genus: Ocyptamus
- Species: O. parvicornis

Binomial name
- Ocyptamus parvicornis (Loew, 1861)

Synonyms
- Baccha parvicornis Loew, 1861

= Ocyptamus parvicornis =

Species of fly

Ocyptamus parvicornis, the scarlet hover fly, is a species in the family Syrphidae.

It was proposed in 2020 that this species be moved to a new genus, Victoriana, and it is now sometimes referred to as Victoriana parvicornis.
