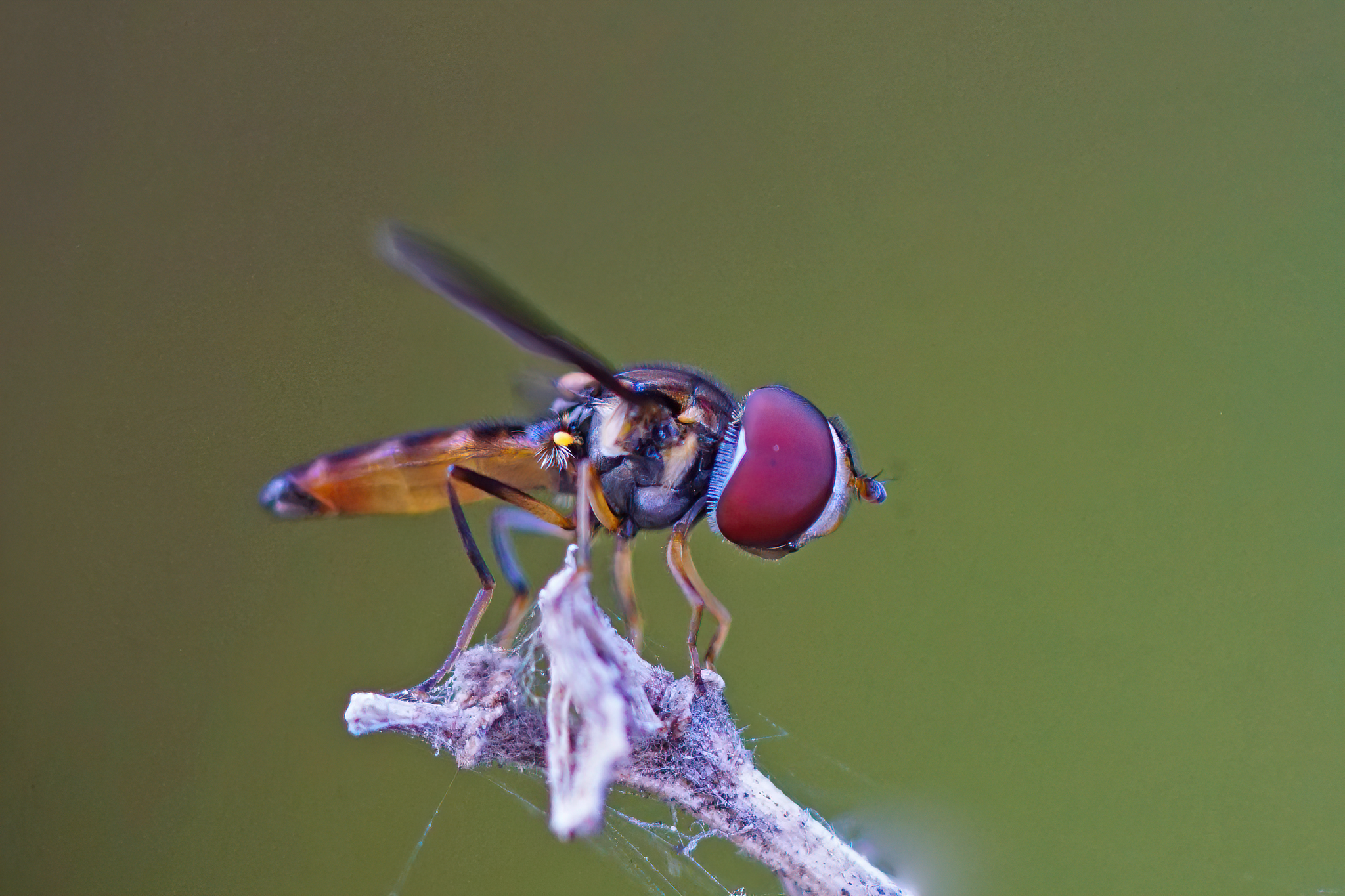

Scientific classification
- Kingdom: Animalia
- Phylum: Arthropoda
- Clade: Pancrustacea
- Class: Insecta
- Order: Diptera
- Family: Syrphidae
- Subfamily: Syrphinae
- Tribe: Syrphini
- Genus: Ocyptamus
- Species: O. antiphates

Binomial name
- Ocyptamus antiphates (Walker, 1849)

Synonyms
- Baccha loewi Sedman, 1965; Ocyptamus scutellatus Loew, 1866; Syrphus antiphates Walker, 1849

= Ocyptamus antiphates =

Species of fly

Ocyptamus antiphates is a species of syrphid fly in the family Syrphidae.
