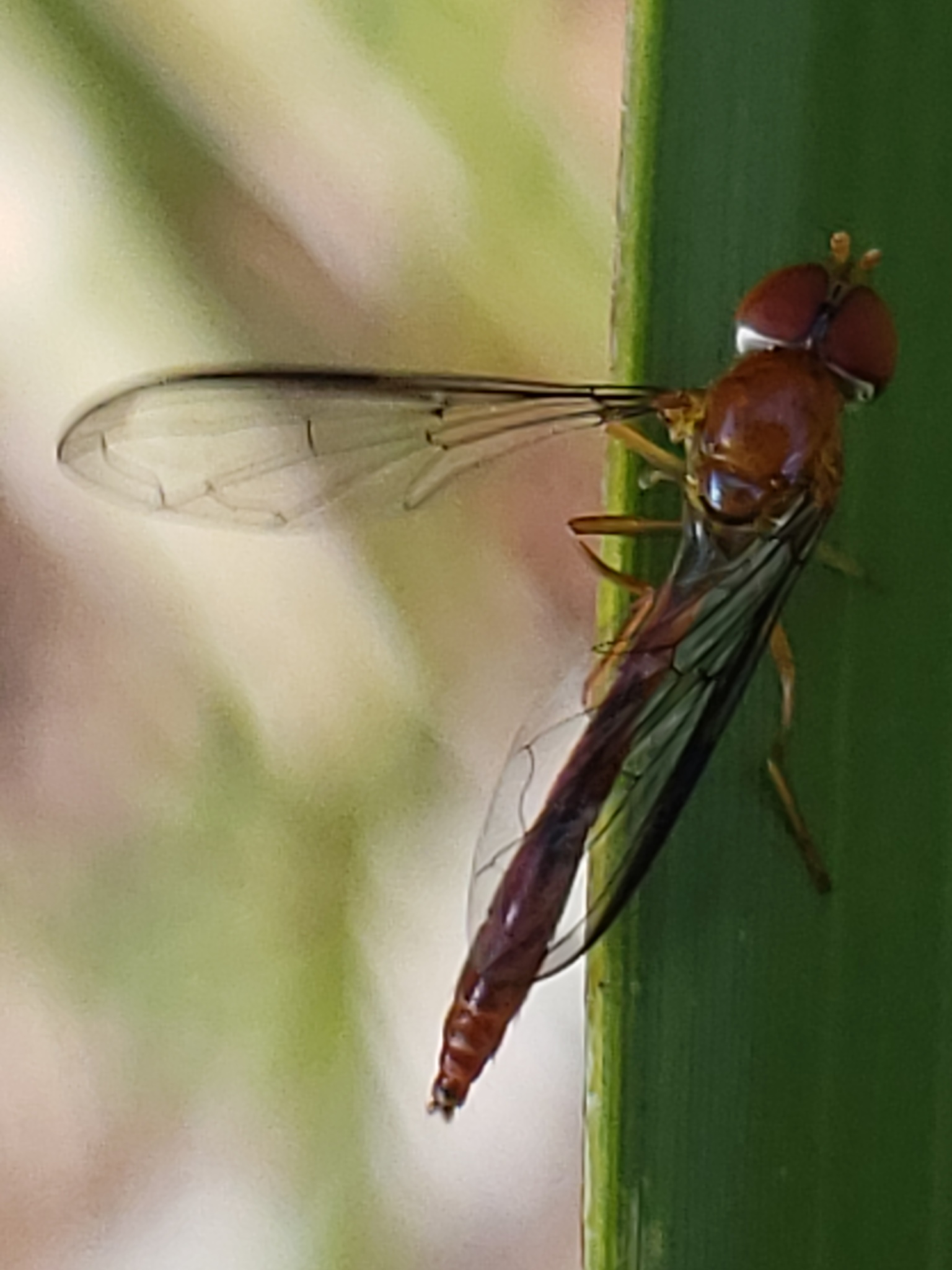
- Victoriana parvicornis

Scientific classification
- Domain: Eukaryota
- Kingdom: Animalia
- Phylum: Arthropoda
- Class: Insecta
- Order: Diptera
- Family: Syrphidae
- Subfamily: Syrphinae
- Tribe: Syrphini
- Genus: Victoriana; Miranda, 2020

Type species
- Baccha melanorrhina Philippi, 1865

Species
- See text

= Victoriana (fly) =

Genus of hoverflies

Victoriana is a genus of hoverflies in the family Syrphidae. This genus, corresponding to the former Ocyptamus melanorrhinus species group, is currently divided into three species groups: V. attenuata, V. melanorrhina and V. parvicornis species groups.

== Species list ==
Victoriana has 3 species groups.

- Victoriana attenuata (Williston, 1891)
- Victoriana melanorrhina (Philippi, 1865)
- Victoriana parvicornis (Loew, 1861)
