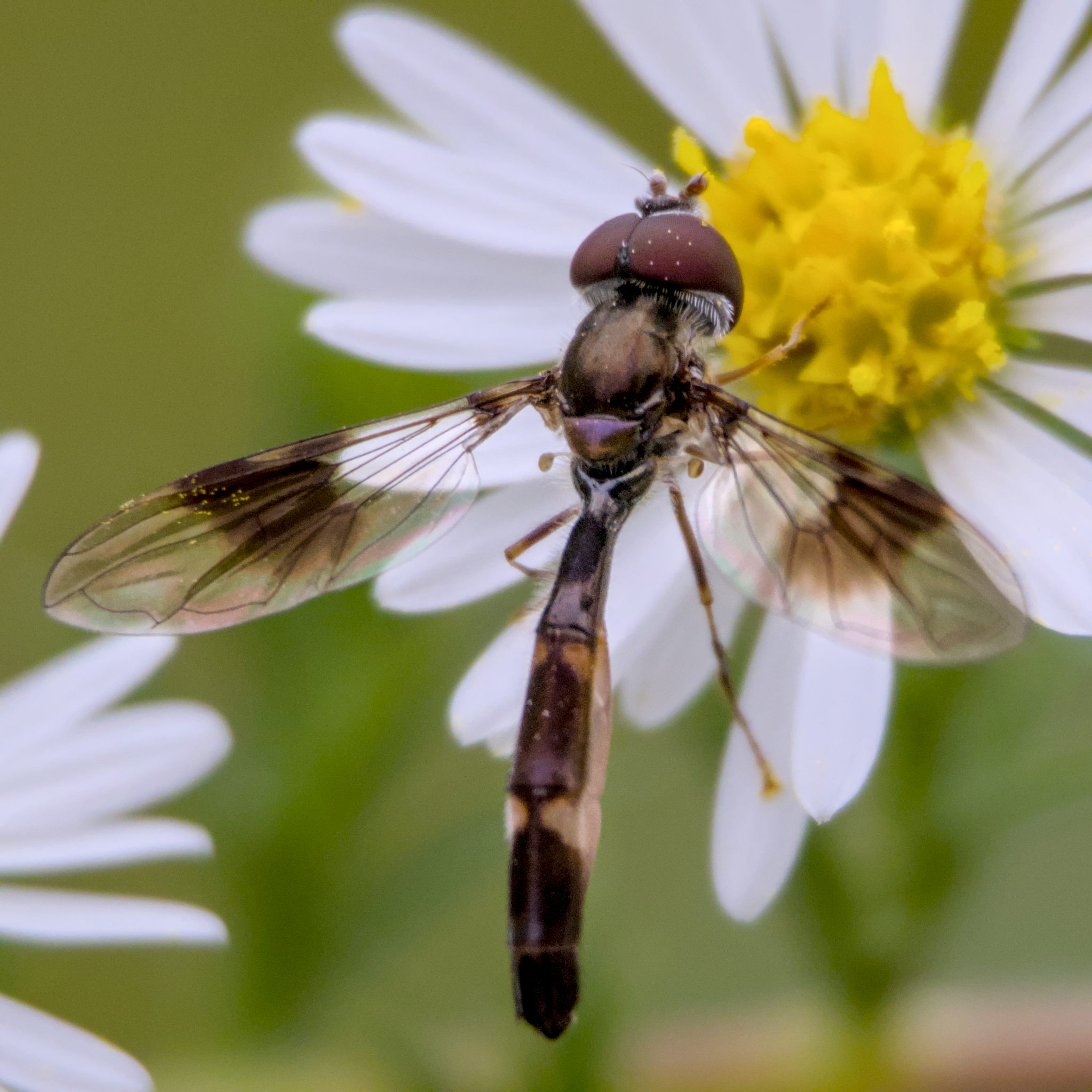

Scientific classification
- Kingdom: Animalia
- Phylum: Arthropoda
- Class: Insecta
- Order: Diptera
- Family: Syrphidae
- Subfamily: Syrphinae
- Tribe: Syrphini
- Genus: Hypocritanus; Miranda, 2020

Type species
- Baccha fascipennis Wiedemann, 1830

= Hypocritanus =

Genus of flies

Hypocritanus is a genus of hoverfly found in the Neotropical region.

== Species ==
- Hypocritanus fascipennis (Wiedemann, 1830)
- Hypocritanus lemur (Osten Sacken, 1877)
