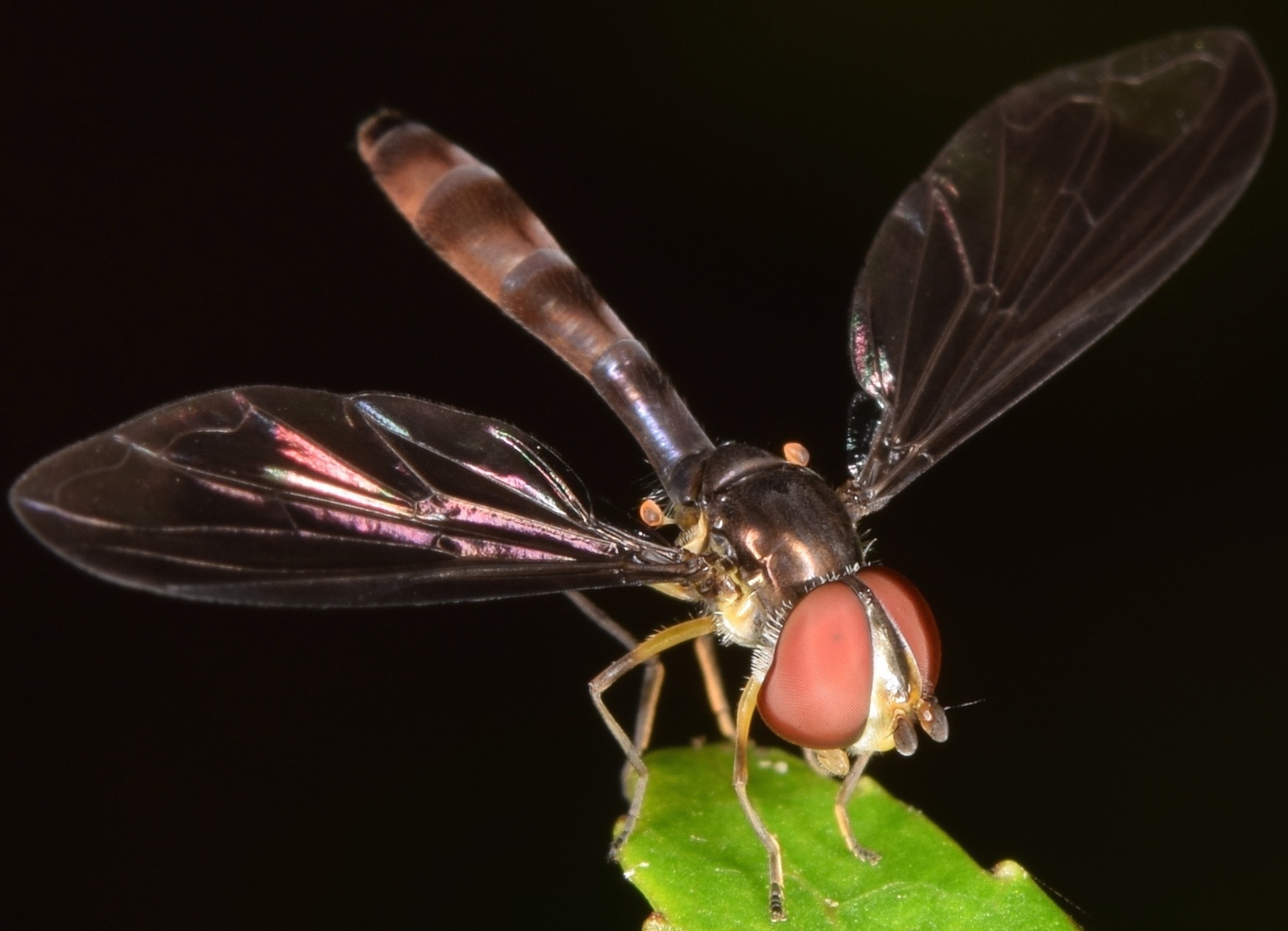

Scientific classification
- Kingdom: Animalia
- Phylum: Arthropoda
- Class: Insecta
- Order: Diptera
- Family: Syrphidae
- Genus: Ocyptamus
- Species: O. fuscipennis

Binomial name
- Ocyptamus fuscipennis (Macquart, 1834)

Synonyms
- Baccha fenestratus Hull, 1949; Baccha fiscipennis Say, 1823; Baccha lugens Loew, 1863; Ocyptamus fascipennis Macquart, 1834; Ocyptamus longiventris Loew, 1866; Syrphus amissas Walker, 1849; Syrphus peas Walker, 1849; Syrphus radaca Walker, 1849

= Ocyptamus fuscipennis =

Species of fly

Ocyptamus fuscipennis is a species of syrphid fly in the family Syrphidae. This fly can be found throughout North America, as well as in Cuba. In Puerto Rico, this species in its larval stage is an predator of autumn cohorts of Toxoptera citricida. Adult flies are known to visit Xyris tennesseensis flowers.
