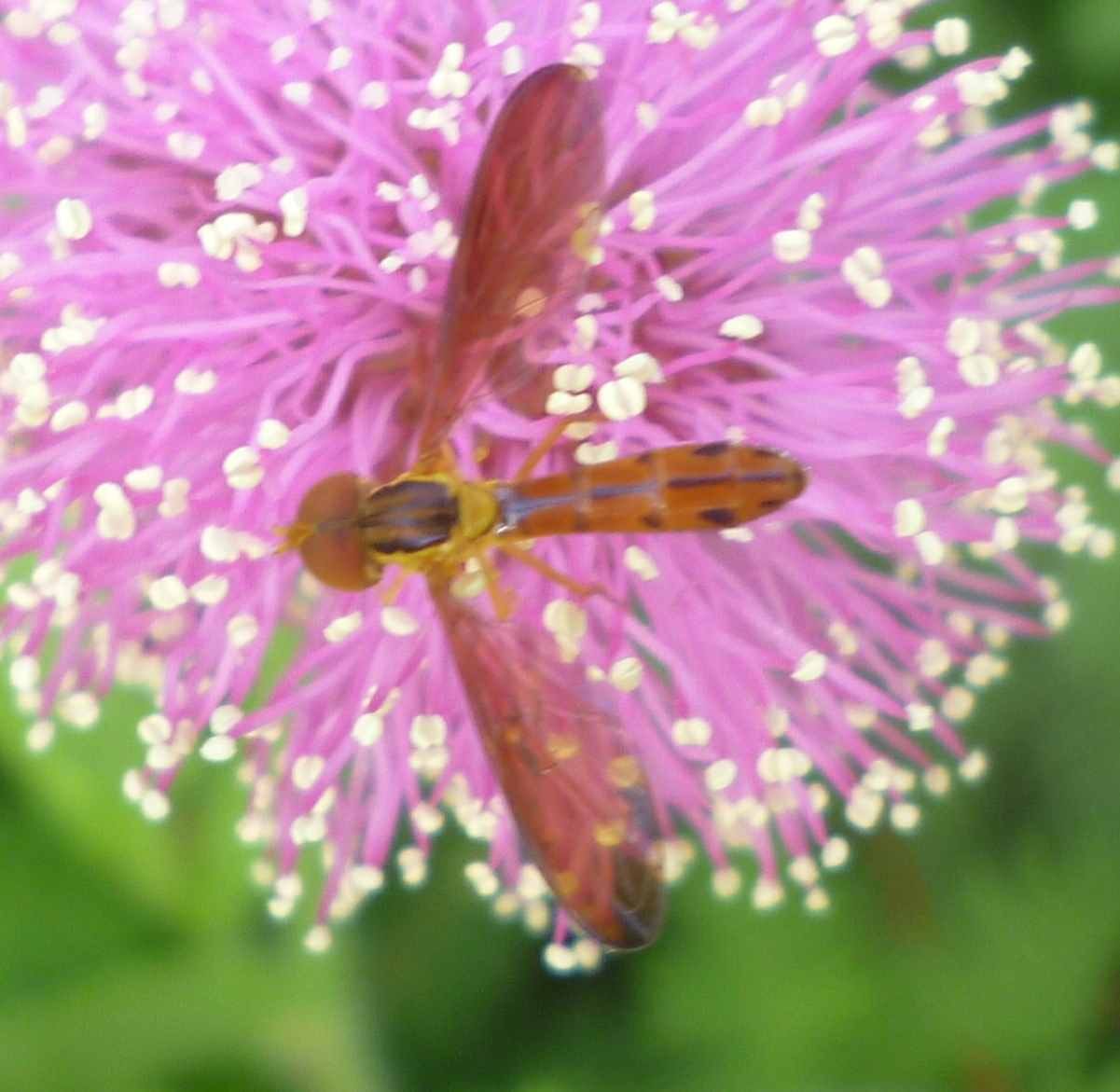
- Nuntianus cubanus (=Ocyptamus cubanus), Florida

Scientific classification
- Domain: Eukaryota
- Kingdom: Animalia
- Phylum: Arthropoda
- Class: Insecta
- Order: Diptera
- Family: Syrphidae
- Tribe: Syrphini
- Genus: Ocyptamus
- Species: O. cubanus

Binomial name
- Ocyptamus cubanus (Hull, 1943)

Synonyms
- Baccha calypso Hull, 1944; Baccha cubanus Hull, 1943

= Ocyptamus cubanus =

Species of fly

Ocyptamus cubanus is a species of syrphid fly in the family Syrphidae.

It was proposed in 2020 that this species be moved to a new genus, Nuntianus, and it is now sometimes referred to as Nuntianus cubanus.
