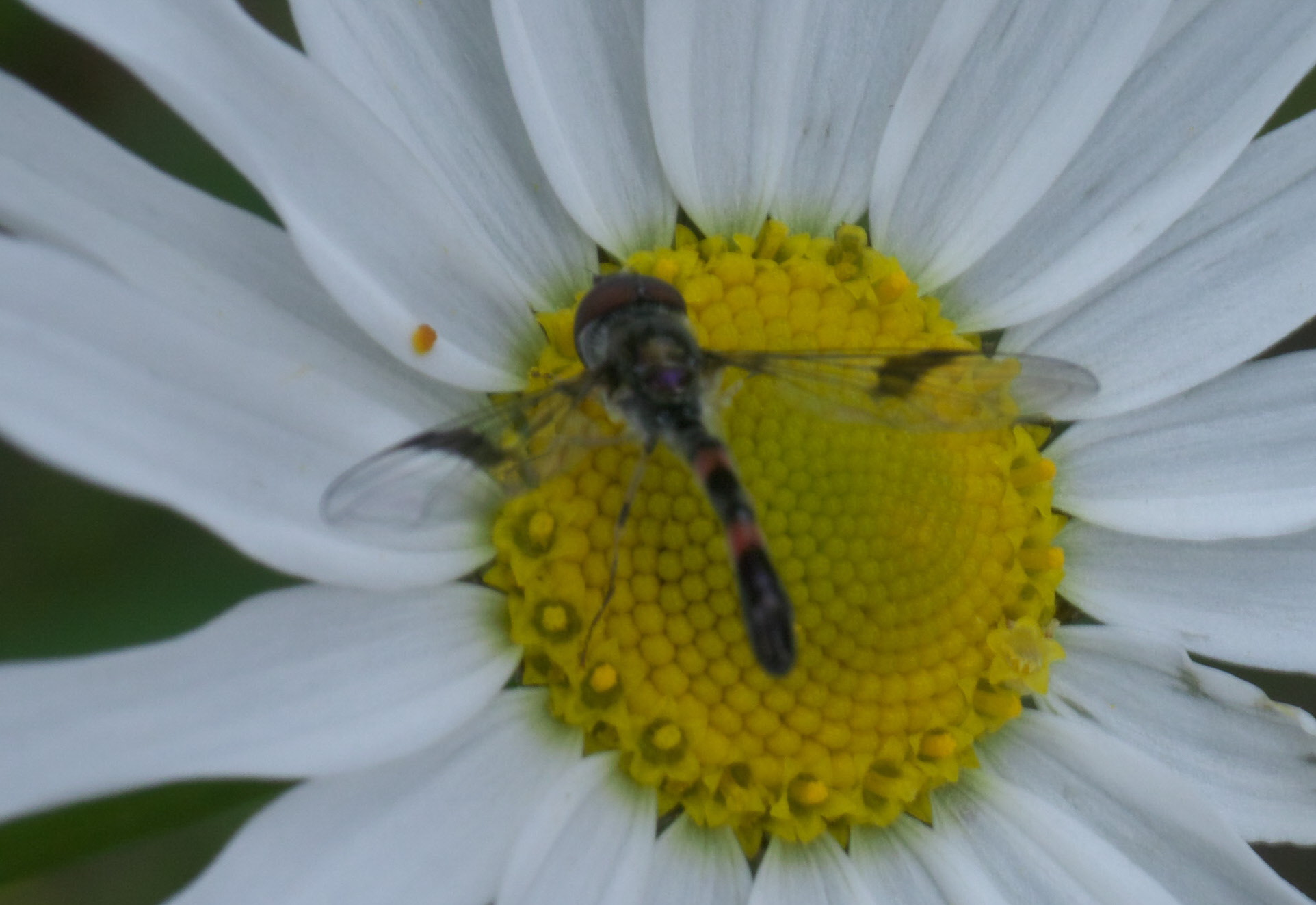

Scientific classification
- Kingdom: Animalia
- Phylum: Arthropoda
- Class: Insecta
- Order: Diptera
- Family: Syrphidae
- Subfamily: Syrphinae
- Tribe: Syrphini
- Genus: Hypocritanus
- Species: H. lemur

Binomial name
- Hypocritanus lemur (Osten Sacken, 1877)

Synonyms
- Baccha lemur Osten Sacken, 1877; Ocyptamus lemur (Osten Sacken, 1877)

= Hypocritanus lemur =

Species of fly

Hypocritanus lemur is a species of syrphid fly in the family Syrphidae. Until 2020, it was classified in the genus Ocyptamus.
