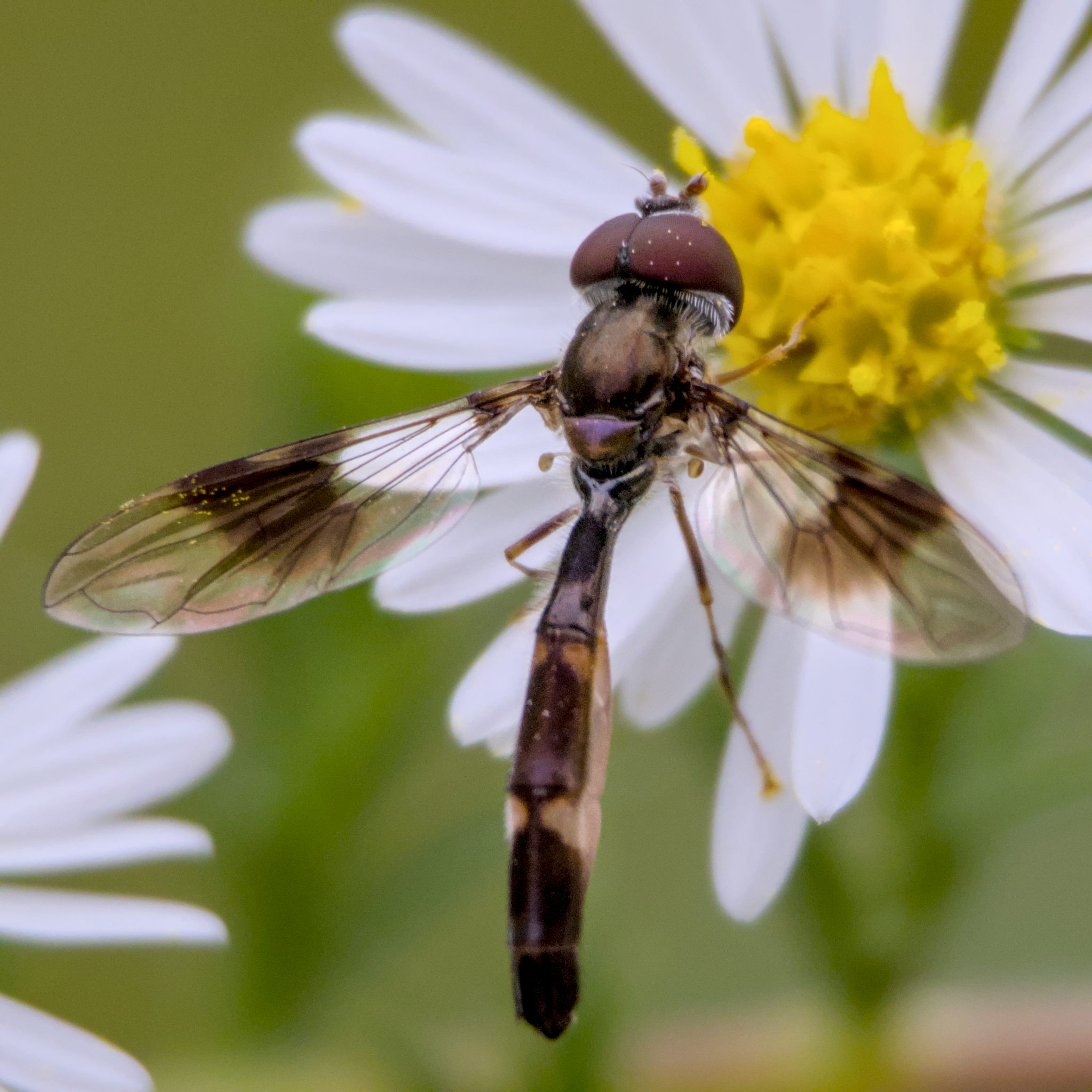

Scientific classification
- Kingdom: Animalia
- Phylum: Arthropoda
- Class: Insecta
- Order: Diptera
- Family: Syrphidae
- Subfamily: Syrphinae
- Tribe: Syrphini
- Genus: Hypocritanus
- Species: H. fascipennis

Binomial name
- Hypocritanus fascipennis (Wiedemann, 1830)

Synonyms
- Ocyptamus fascipennis (Wiedemann, 1830)

= Hypocritanus fascipennis =

Species of fly

Hypocritanus fascipennis is a North American species of syrphid fly in the family Syrphidae. Until 2020, it was classified in the genus Ocyptamus. The common name is the eastern band-winged hover fly.
