= A. bequaerti =

A. bequaerti may refer to:

- Abacetus bequaerti, a ground beetle
- Aethiothemis bequaerti, a dragonfly found in Africa
- Allobaccha bequaerti, a hoverfly found in Cameroon
- Anubias bequaerti, a synonym of Anubias heterophylla, a plant found in Africa
- Azteca bequaerti, an ant found in Brazil and Peru
