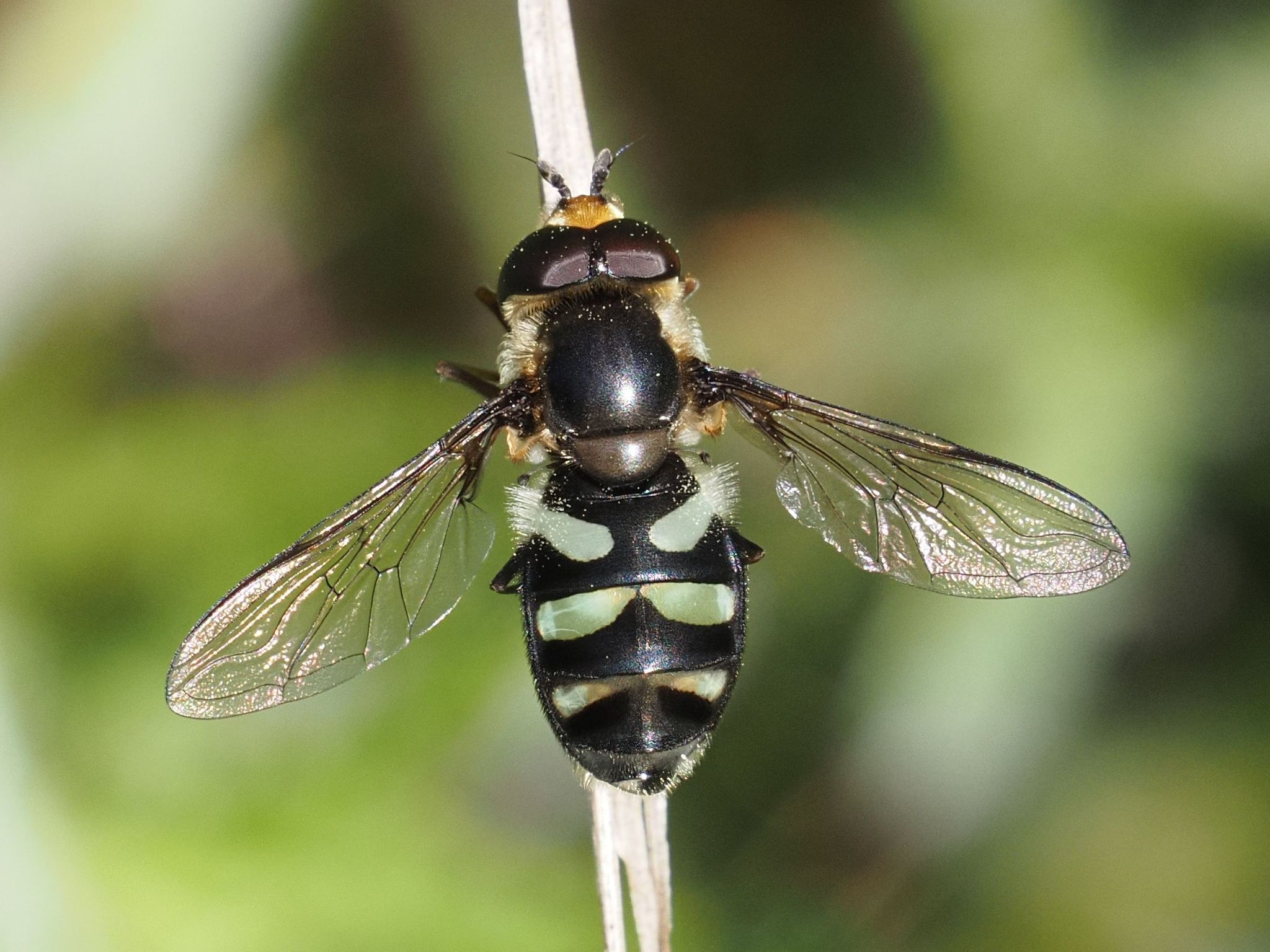

Scientific classification
- Kingdom: Animalia
- Phylum: Arthropoda
- Class: Insecta
- Order: Diptera
- Family: Syrphidae
- Genus: Didea
- Species: D. alneti

Binomial name
- Didea alneti Fallén, 1817

= Didea alneti =

Species of fly

Didea alneti is a Holarctic species of hoverfly.

== Description ==
For terms see Morphology of Diptera

The wing length is 9 ·75-11·5 mm.

The face mostly yellow. Halteres with at least knob black or dark brown. Male vertex not long, less narrow than in Didea fasciata. Tergite 5 black, rarely with spots. Male tergite 4 with front edge of wedge-shaped bars clearly separated from the front margin of the tergite or just touching front of tergite on median line. The male genitalia and the larva are figured by Dusek and Laska (1967) .

== Distribution ==
A Palearctic species with a wide distribution in Europe and East across Russia to the Pacific coast, Mongolia, Japan and Korea. in North America from Alaska south to Colorado.

== Biology ==
Habitat forest; conifer forest and taiga, Quercus woodland. Arboreal, descending to visit flowers of white umbellifers, yellow composites, Cirsium, Plantago, Potentilla, Rosa, Rubus idaeus, Salix, Sambucus ebulus, Valeriana officinalis, Viburnum opulus. The flight period is mid May to early September. The larva is arboreal and feeds on aphids associated with Larix, Prunus, Salix and Quercus.
