= Dideoides =

Scientific classification
- Kingdom: Animalia
- Phylum: Arthropoda
- Class: Insecta
- Order: Diptera
- Family: Syrphidae
- Subfamily: Syrphinae
- Tribe: Syrphini
- Genus: Dideoides; Brunetti, 1908

Genus of flies

Dideoides is a genus of hoverflies distributed in Japan, China, and the Philippines

== Description ==
Species in the genus differ from those in the genus Didea in some respects. The 3rd antennal joint is compressed, as long as the first and 2nd taken together, and near the base at the back has a long arista, which is much longer than the antenna itself. The proboscis is much longer, nearly 1/3 of the height of the head, the oral opening is oval and narrower towards the apex. The vertex (female) is much narrower than the half breadth of the front between the antennae. The compound eyes are pubescent. The wings are broader and longer, the 3rd longitudinal vein opens before the apex and is nearly straight or a little curved. The cross-vein is at about 1/4 of the discoidal cell, and the bend of the 4th vein has no appendage (only a fold may be seen). The lateral sides of the abdomen are distinctly ridged.

== Species ==
The genus contains about 11 species:

- Dideoides consimilis (Macquart, 1850)
- Dideoides coquilletti (Goot, 1964)
- Dideoides depressus (Meijere, 1914)
- Dideoides kempi Brunetti, 1923
- Dideoides latus (Coquillett, 1898)
- Dideoides ovatus Brunetti, 1908
- Dideoides pretiosus (Curran, 1928)
- Dideoides qinlingensis Huo, Ren & Zheng, 2007
- Dideoides tigerinus (Bigot, 1885)
- Dideoides trilineatus Brunetti, 1923
- Dideoides zhengi Huo, Ren & Zheng, 2007
