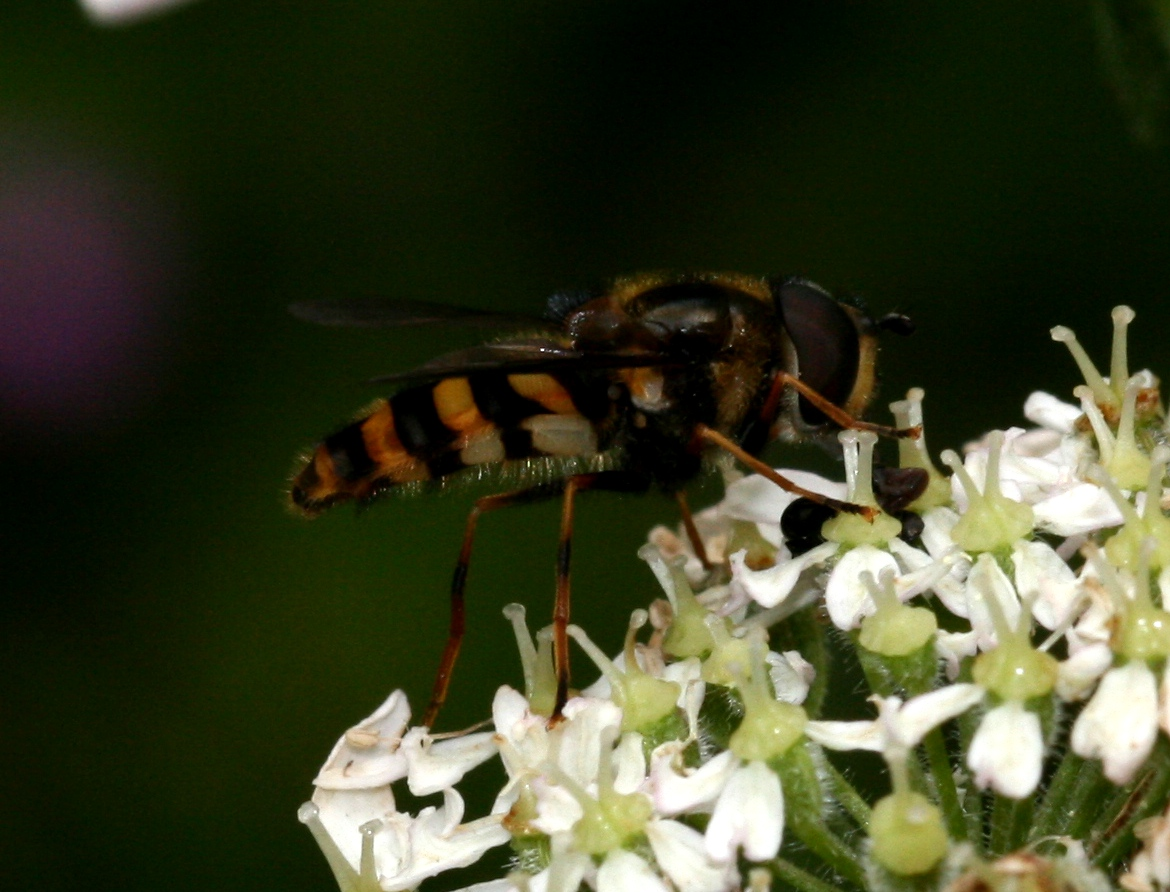
- Megasyrphus erratica male

Scientific classification
- Kingdom: Animalia
- Phylum: Arthropoda
- Class: Insecta
- Order: Diptera
- Family: Syrphidae
- Tribe: Syrphini
- Genus: Megasyrphus; Dusek & Láska, 1967

= Megasyrphus =

Genus of flies

Megasyrphus is a genus of hoverflies in the subfamily Syrphinae. It was formally a subgenus of Eriozona.

== Species ==
- Megasyrphus alashayicus (Peck, 1974)
- Megasyrphus catalina (Curran, 1830)
- Megasyrphus chinensis (Ho, 1987)
- Megasyrphus erraticus (Linnaeus, 1758)
- Megasyrphus laxus (Osten Sacken, 1875)
