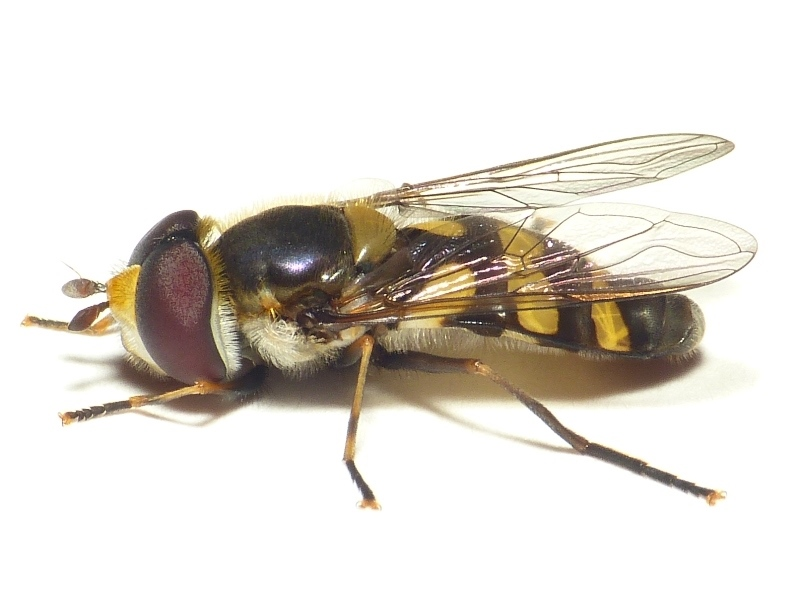

Scientific classification
- Kingdom: Animalia
- Phylum: Arthropoda
- Class: Insecta
- Order: Diptera
- Family: Syrphidae
- Subfamily: Syrphinae
- Tribe: Syrphini
- Genus: Didea
- Species: D. intermedia

Binomial name
- Didea intermedia Loew, 1854

= Didea intermedia =

Species of fly

Didea intermedia is a European species of hoverfly.
