= Doros =

Doros can refer to

- Doros, Cyprus, a village in Limassol District
- Doros, the medieval name for Mangup, Crimea
- Doros (fly), a genus of insects in the family Syrphidae
- Dorus (mythology), several characters named Dorus or Doros in Greek mythology
- DorOS, mobile operating system, e.g. Doro 7081-phone
