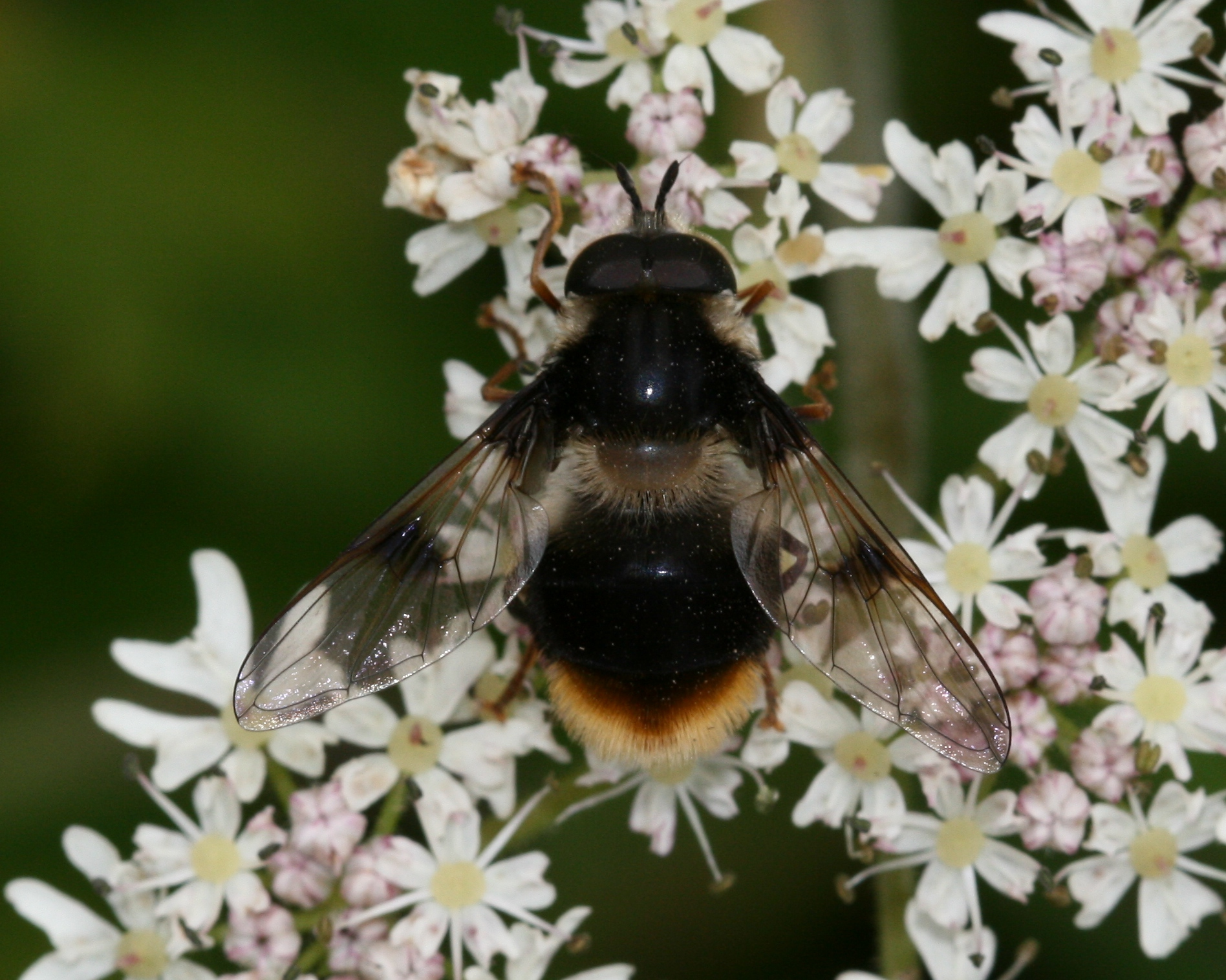
- Male
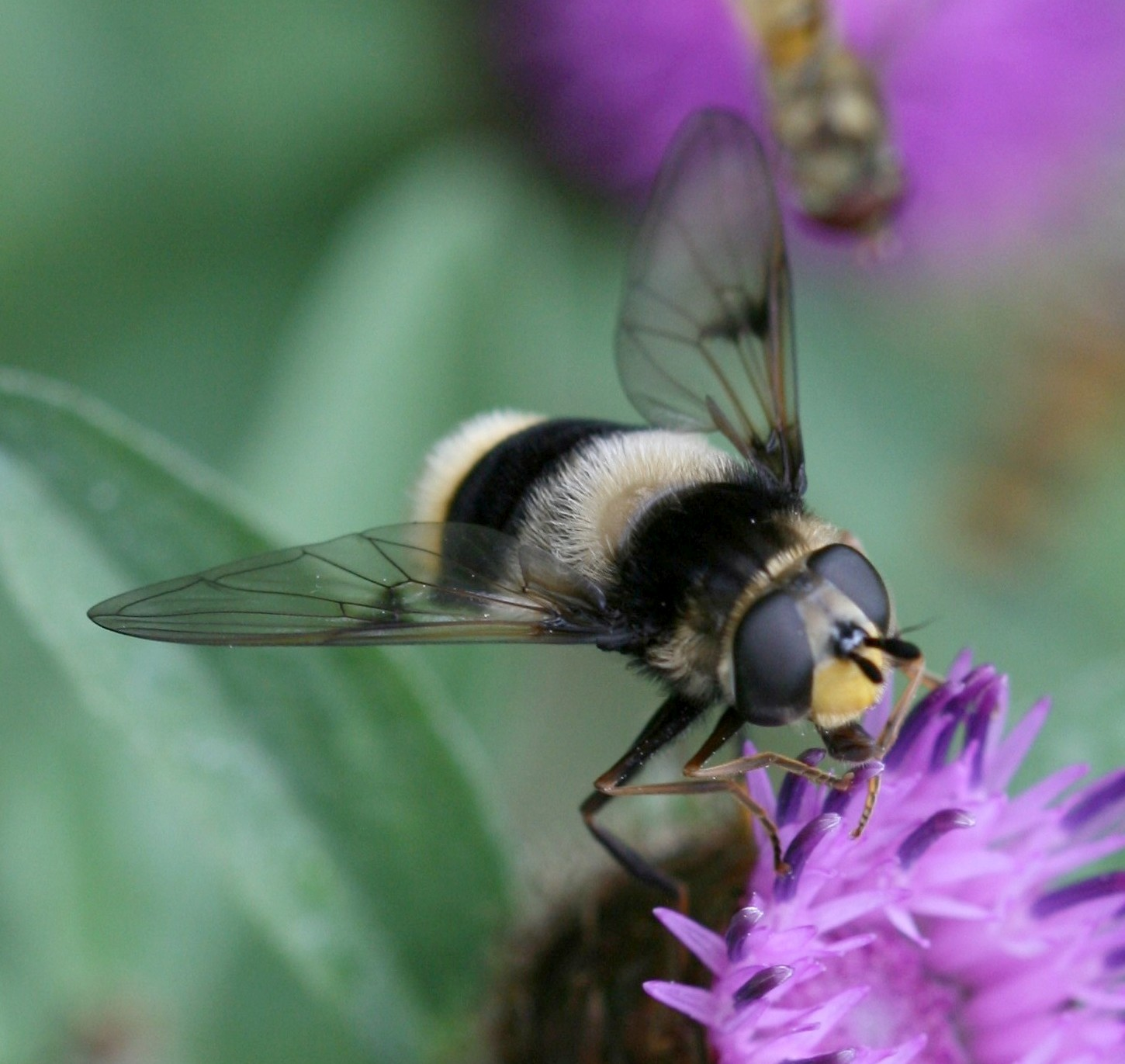
- Female

Scientific classification
- Kingdom: Animalia
- Phylum: Arthropoda
- Class: Insecta
- Order: Diptera
- Family: Syrphidae
- Genus: Eriozona
- Species: E. syrphoides

Binomial name
- Eriozona syrphoides (Fallén, 1817)

= Eriozona syrphoides =

Species of fly

Eriozona syrphoides is a European species of hoverfly. A large bee mimic. The thorax has black hairs in the middle and yellow or reddish hairs on the front and hind margins. The scutellum is white to yellow with yellow hairs. The abdomen has white hairs in front, black in the middle and has red hairs at the tip. The wing has a dark patch. The habitat is Picea, Abies forest. It is arboreal descending to feed on white umbellifers, Centaurea, Cirsium, Crataegus, Epilobium, Hypericum, Ranunculus, Sambucus nigra, Sorbus aucuparia, Succisa, Valeriana. It ranges from Fennoscandia south to France (Vosges, Alps, Pyrenees) and from Ireland eastwards through Central Europe and northern Italy into European Russia and the Russian Far East and on through Siberia to the Pacific coast. The larva feeds on aphids.
