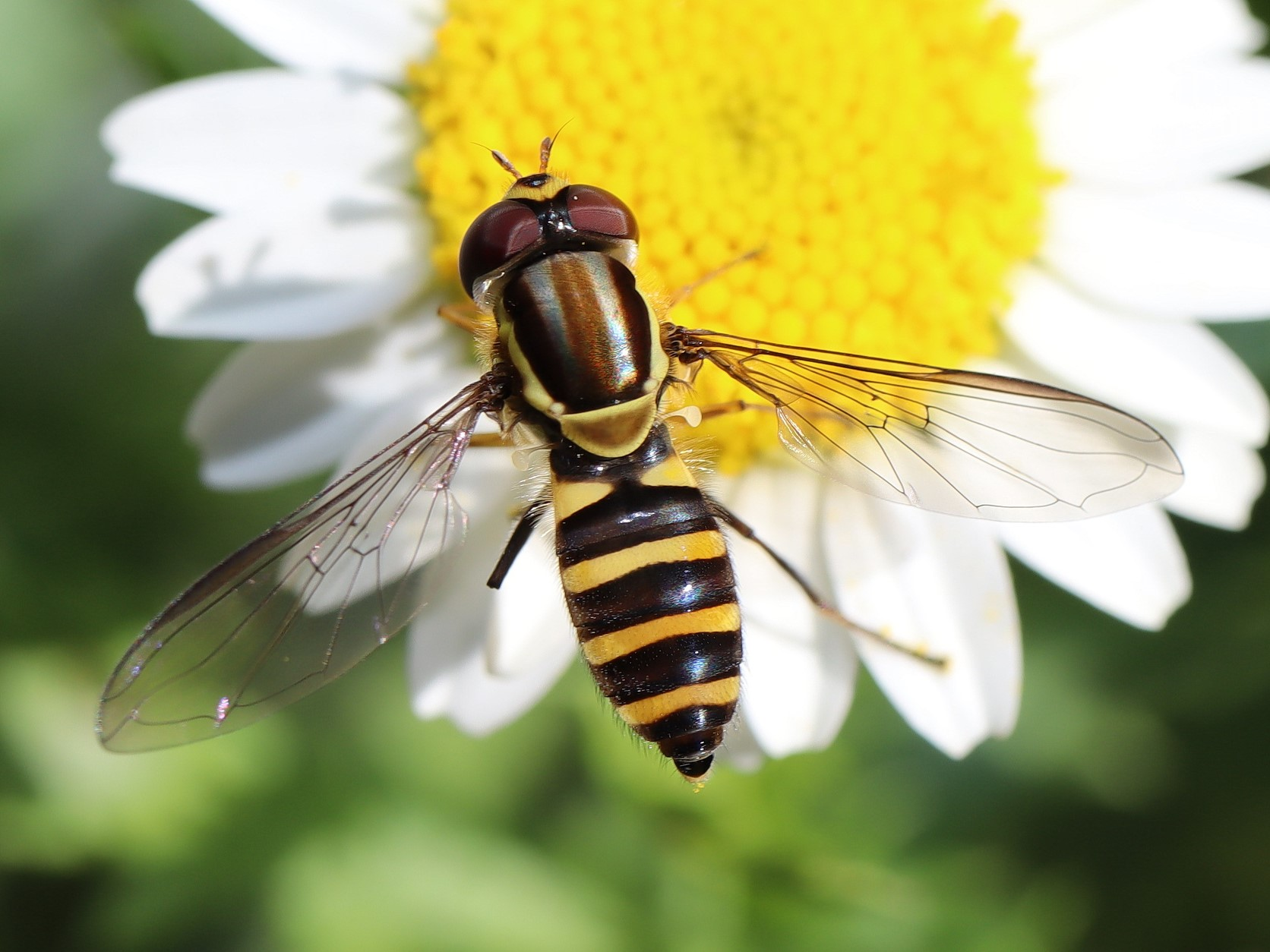
- Citrogramma notiale

Scientific classification
- Kingdom: Animalia
- Phylum: Arthropoda
- Class: Insecta
- Order: Diptera
- Family: Syrphidae
- Tribe: Syrphini
- Genus: Citrogramma; Vockeroth, 1969

Type species
- Syrphus hervebazini Curran, 1928

= Citrogramma =

Genus of flies

Citrogramma is a genus of hoverflies.

== Species ==
- C. amarilla Mengual, 2012
- C. arisanicum (Shiraki, 1930)
- C. asombrosum Mengual, 2012
- C. australe Thompson, 2012
- C. bicornutum Vockeroth, 1969
- C. chola Ghorpadé, 1994
- C. circumdatum (Meijere, 1908)
- C. citrinoides Wyatt, 1991
- C. citrinum Brunetti, 1923
- C. clarus (Hervé-Bazin, 1923)
- C. currani Ghorpadé, 2012
- C. difficile (Curran, 1928)
- C. distinctum Thompson, 2012
- C. fascipleura (Curran, 1931)
- C. flavigenum Wyatt, 1991
- C. frederici Mengual & Ghorpadé, 2012
- C. fumipenne (Matsumura, 1916)
- C. gedehanum (Meijere, 1914)
- C. henryi Ghorpadé, 1994
- C. hervebazini (Curran, 1928)
- C. luteifrons (Meijere, 1908)
- C. luteopleurum Mengual, 2012
- C. marissa Mengual, 2012
- C. matsumurai Mengual, 2012
- C. notiale Vockeroth, 1969
- C. pendleburyi (Curran, 1928)
- C. pennardsi Mengual, 2012
- C. pintada Mengual, 2012
- C. pinyton Mengual, 2012
- C. quadratum Mengual, 2012
- C. quadricornutum Vockeroth, 1969
- C. robertsi Wyatt, 1991
- C. schlingeri Thompson, 2012
- C. sedlacekorum Vockeroth, 1969
- C. shirakii Mengual, 2012
- C. solomonensis Wyatt, 1991
- C. triton Mengual, 2012
- C. variscutatus (Curran, 1928)
- C. vockerothi Wyatt, 1991
- C. wyatti Mengual, 2012
