= Afrosyrphus =

Scientific classification
- Kingdom: Animalia
- Phylum: Arthropoda
- Class: Insecta
- Order: Diptera
- Family: Syrphidae
- Subfamily: Syrphinae
- Tribe: Syrphini
- Genus: Afrosyrphus; Curran, 1927

Type species
- Afrosyrphus varipes Curran, 1927

Genus of flies

Afrosyrphus is an African genus of hoverfly. They mimic stingless bees, having long, upward pointing antennae and hairy hind legs. Larvae feed on aphids.

== Species ==
Currently, there are two described species.

- Afrosyrphus varipes Curran, 1927
- Afrosyrphus schmuttereri Mengual, Ssymank, Skevington, Reemer & Ståhls, 2020

== Distribution ==
Zaire, Angola, Cameroon, Kenya, South Africa, Democratic Republic of Congo, Uganda.
