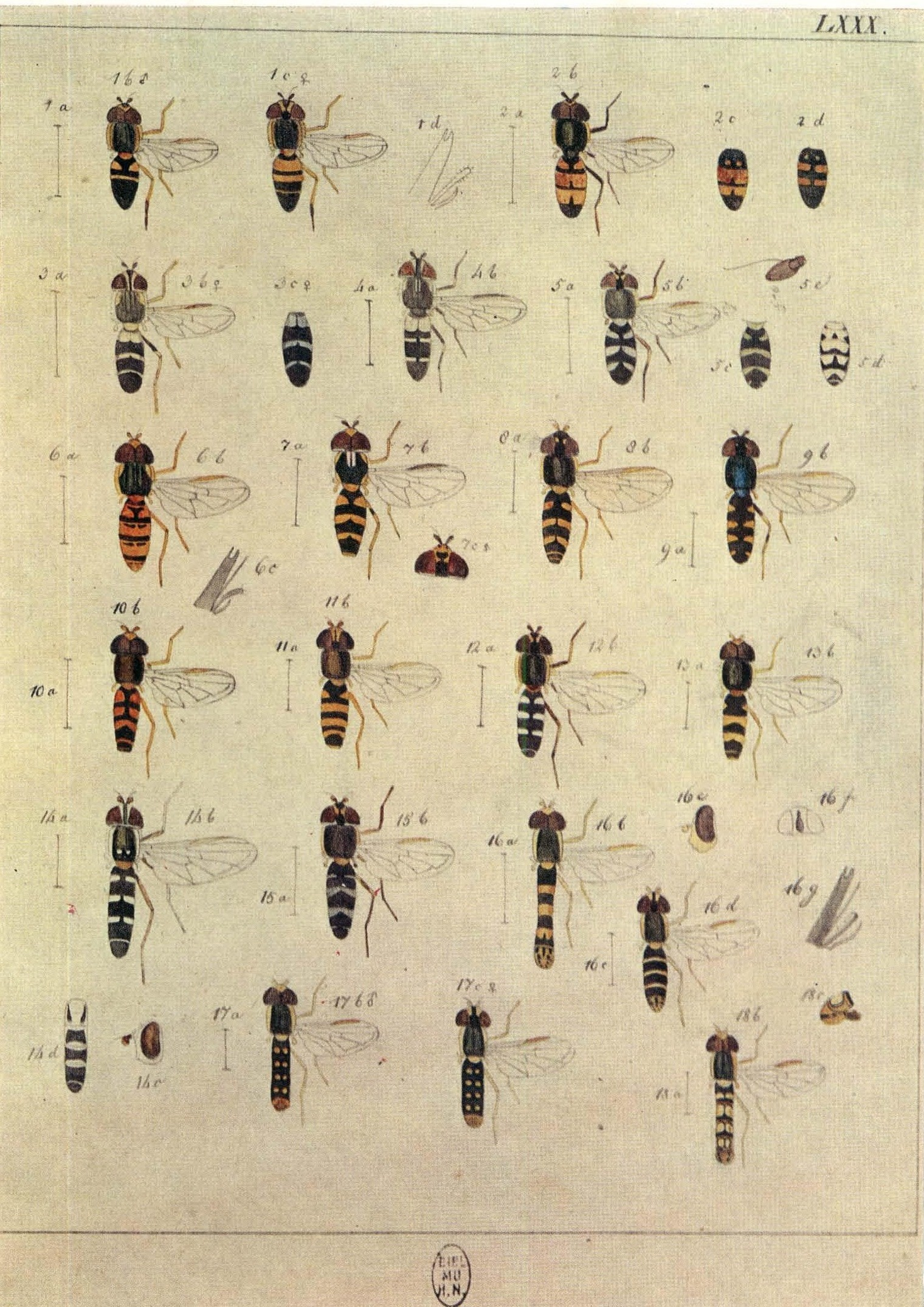
- Meligramma guttata in Meigen Europäischen Zweiflügeligen (figure 15)

Scientific classification
- Kingdom: Animalia
- Phylum: Arthropoda
- Class: Insecta
- Order: Diptera
- Family: Syrphidae
- Genus: Meligramma
- Species: M. guttatum

Binomial name
- Meligramma guttatum (Fallén, 1817)

Synonyms

= Meligramma guttatum =

Species of fly

Meligramma guttatum is a Holarctic species of hoverfly.

== Description ==
External images For terms, see: Morphology of Diptera. Wing length 5 · 25–7 mm. Antennae black. Tibiae 1 and tarsi 1 partly dark-coloured. Thorax dorsum with 2 yellow spots just before scutellum, (which may be absent in the male). Marks on tergites 3 and 4 rectangular. The male genitalia are figured by Hippa (1968). Larva described and figured by Rotheray (1994).

See references for determination.

== Distribution ==
Palearctic: Fennoscandia South to the Pyrenees. Ireland East through North Europe and Central Europe into European Russia, the Russian Far East and Siberia to the Pacific coast (Sakhalin); Nearctic: from Alaska to Arizona.

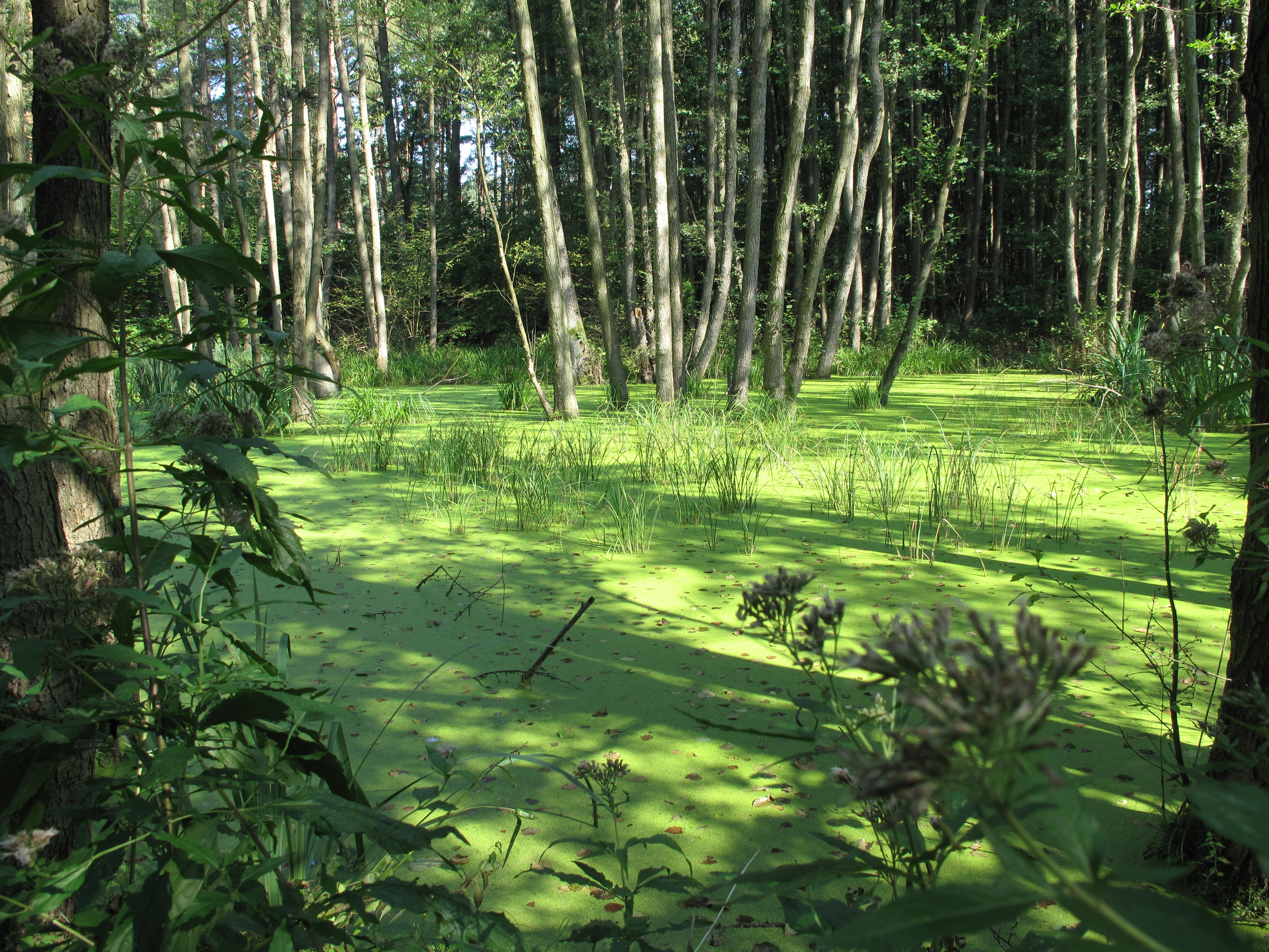
Habitat. Germany

== Biology ==
Habitat: Deciduous forest, field hedges with mature Fraxinus, mature Salix and Alnus carr. Flowers visited include white umbellifers, Epilobium angustifolium, Euonymus, Filipendula, Frangula alnus, Galium, Solidago. The flight period is June to August.
