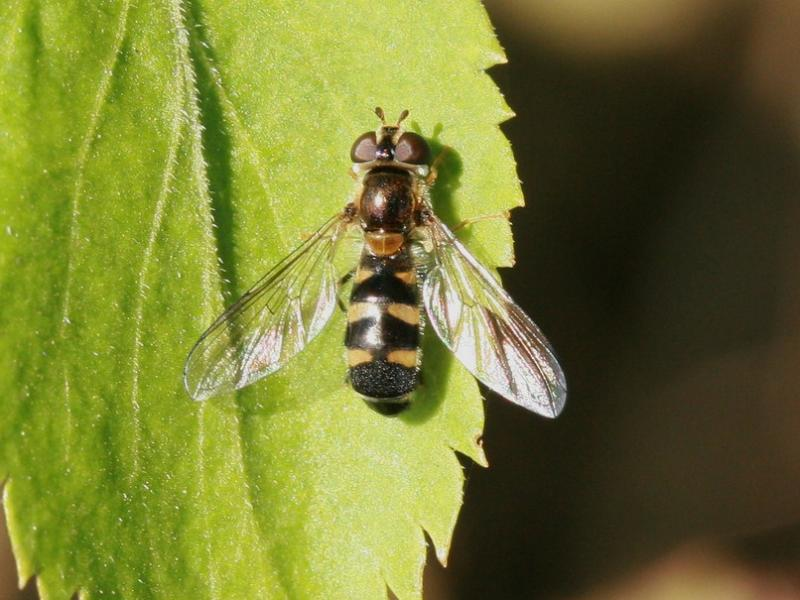
- Meligramma triangulifera

Scientific classification
- Kingdom: Animalia
- Phylum: Arthropoda
- Class: Insecta
- Order: Diptera
- Family: Syrphidae
- Tribe: Syrphini
- Genus: Meligramma; Frey, 1946

= Meligramma =

Genus of flies

Meligramma is a genus of hoverflies in the subfamily Syrphinae.

== Species ==
- M. cingulatum (Egger, 1860)
- M. guttatum (Fallén, 1817)
- M. triangulifera (Zetterstedt, 1843)
- M. vespertinum (Vockeroth, 1980)
