= Allobaccha =

Scientific classification
- Kingdom: Animalia
- Phylum: Arthropoda
- Class: Insecta
- Order: Diptera
- Family: Syrphidae
- Tribe: Syrphini
- Genus: Allobaccha; Curran, 1928

Type species
- Baccha rubella Van der Wulp, 1898

Genus of flies

Allobaccha is a genus of hoverfly with a large number of species. It was originally created as a subgenus of Baccha. Many species have an elongated wasp like abdomen and adults as well as larvae are predators of soft-bodied Hemiptera.

== Species ==
Species in the genus include:

- A. atra (Van Doesburg, 1959)
- A. basalis (Walker, 1861)
- A. bequaerti (Curran, 1929)
- A. denhoedi (Van Doesburg, 1959)
- A. flavipes (Van Doesburg, 1959)
- A. fumosa Dirickx, 2010
- A. inversa (Curran, 1929)
- A. liberia (Curran, 1929)
- A. loriae (De Meijere, 1908)
- A. macgregori (Curran, 1929)
- A. madecassa Dirickx, 2010
- A. mundula (Van der Wulp, 1898)
- A. nigroscutata (Enderlein, 1938)
- A. nitidithorax (Curran, 1929)
- A. obscura Dirickx, 2010
- A. purpuricola (Walker, 1859)
- A. rubella (Van der Wulp, 1898)
- A. sapphirina (Wiedemann, 1830)
- A. similis Dirickx, 2010
- A. subflava Dirickx, 2010
- A. pallida (De Meijere, 1908)

Allobaccha picta (Wiedemann, 1830) is a synonym of Copestylum pictum (Wiedemann, 1830).
