= Epistrophella =

Scientific classification
- Kingdom: Animalia
- Phylum: Arthropoda
- Class: Insecta
- Order: Diptera
- Family: Syrphidae
- Tribe: Syrphini
- Genus: Epistrophella; Dusek & Láska, 1967

Genus of flies

Epistrophella is a genus of hoverflies in the subfamily Syrphinae, formerly treated as a subgenus of Epistrophe.

== Species ==
- Epistrophella coronata (Rondani, 1857)
- Epistrophella emarginata (Say, 1823)
- Epistrophella euchromus (Kowarz, 1885)
- Epistrophella shibakawae (Matsumura, 1917)
