= Epistrophella euchromus =

Scientific classification
- Kingdom: Animalia
- Phylum: Arthropoda
- Class: Insecta
- Order: Diptera
- Family: Syrphidae
- Genus: Epistrophella
- Species: E. euchromus

Binomial name
- Epistrophella euchromus (Kowarz, 1885)

Synonyms
- Syrphus euchromus Kowarz, 1885; Epistrophe euchroma (Kowarz, 1885); Meligramma euchromum (Kowarz, 1885)

Species of fly

Epistrophella euchromus is a European species of hoverfly.
