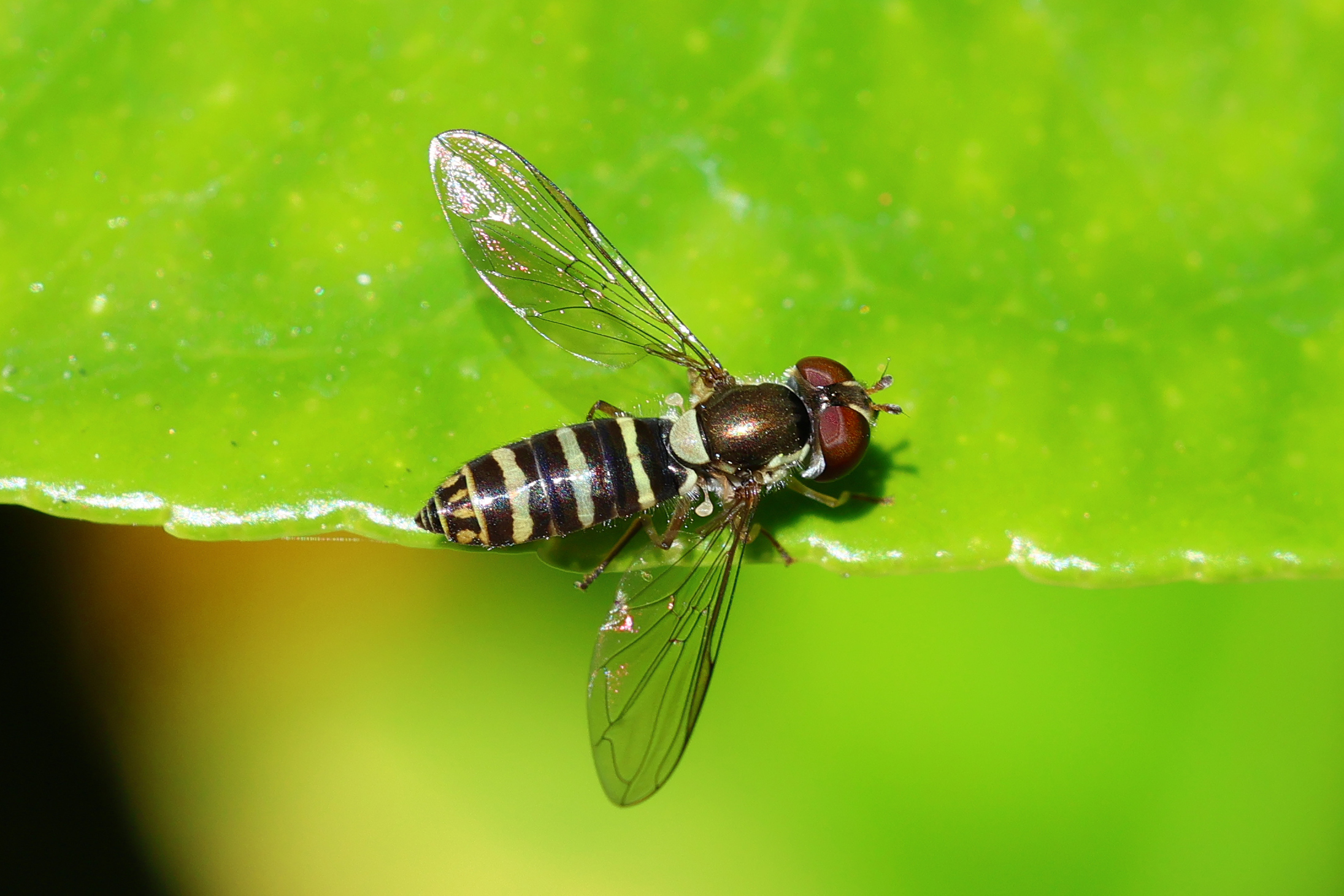
- Female Fazia micrura

Scientific classification
- Kingdom: Animalia
- Phylum: Arthropoda
- Class: Insecta
- Order: Diptera
- Family: Syrphidae
- Subfamily: Syrphinae
- Tribe: Syrphini
- Genus: Fazia; Shannon, 1927

Type species
- Fazia bullaephora Shannon, 1927 (= decemmaculata Rondani, 1863)

Synonyms
- Chasmia Enderlein, 1938 (Unav.); Microsphaerophoria Frey, 1946; Epistrophe (Metallograpta) Hull, 1949; Epistrophe (Metepistrophe) Hull, 1949

= Fazia (fly) =

Genus of flies

Fazia is a genus of hoverflies, formerly treated as a subgenus of Allograpta (e.g.,), but now treated as a genus, though not monophyletic as presently defined.

== Species ==
- Fazia alta (Curran, 1936)
- Fazia altissima (Fluke, 1942)
- Fazia argentipila (Fluke, 1942)
- Fazia centropogonis (Nishida, 2002)
- Fazia colombia (Curran, 1925)
- Fazia decemmaculata (Rondani, 1863)
- Fazia eupeltata (Bigot, 1884)
- Fazia fasciata (Curran, 1932)
- Fazia fascifrons (Macquart, 1846)
- Fazia flukei (Curran, 1936)
- Fazia funeralia (Hull, 1944)
- Fazia hians (Enderlein, 1938)
- Fazia imitator (Curran, 1925)
- Fazia luna (Fluke, 1942)
- Fazia macquarti (Blanchard, 1852)
- Fazia micrura (Osten Sacken, 1877)
- Fazia mu (Bigot, 1884)
- Fazia nasigera Enderlein, 1938
- Fazia plaumanni (Frey, 1946)
- Fazia remigis (Fluke, 1942)
- Fazia roburoris (Fluke, 1942)
- Fazia rostrata (Bigot, 1884)
- Fazia saussurii (Giglio-Tos, 1892)
- Fazia similis (Curran, 1925)
- Fazia strigifacies Enderlein, 1938
- Fazia syrphica (Giglio-Tos, 1892)
- Fazia willistoni (Giglio-Tos, 1893)
