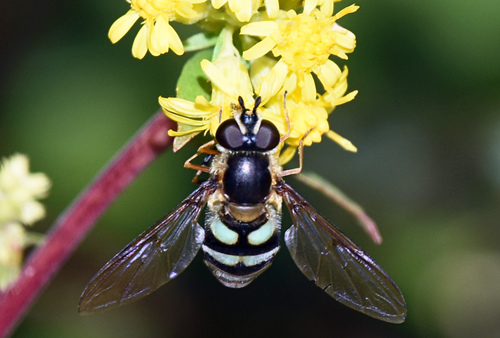

Scientific classification
- Kingdom: Animalia
- Phylum: Arthropoda
- Class: Insecta
- Order: Diptera
- Family: Syrphidae
- Genus: Megasyrphus
- Species: M. laxus

Binomial name
- Megasyrphus laxus Osten Sacken 1875

= Megasyrphus laxus =

Species of hoverfly

Megasyrphus laxus (Osten Sacken 1875), the black-legged gossamer fly, is an uncommon species of syrphid fly observed throughout North America. Hoverflies can remain nearly motionless in flight. The adults are also known as flower flies for they are commonly found on flowers, from which they get both energy-giving nectar and protein-rich pollen. Larvae are unknown.
