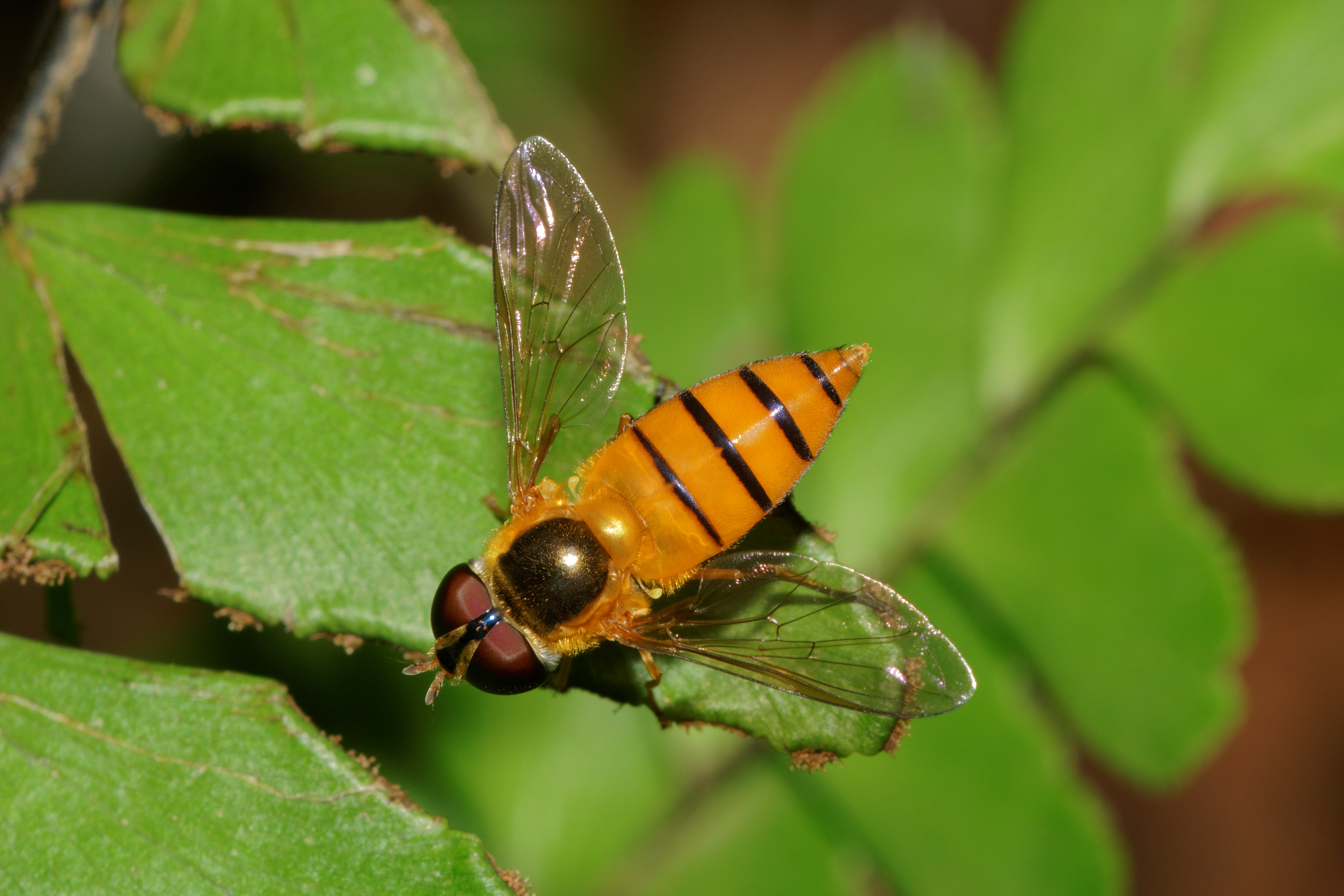
- Asarkina sp.

Scientific classification
- Kingdom: Animalia
- Phylum: Arthropoda
- Class: Insecta
- Order: Diptera
- Family: Syrphidae
- Tribe: Syrphini
- Genus: Asarkina; Macquart, 1834

Type species
- Syrphus rostrata Wiedemann, 1824
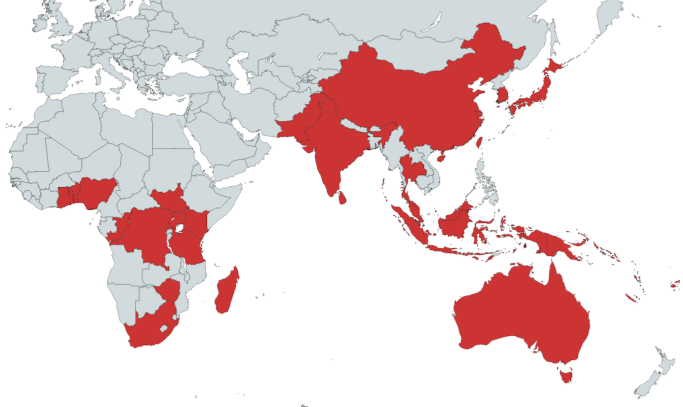
- Range map for Asarkina

= Asarkina =

Genus of flies

Asarkina is a genus of hoverfly. Mostly found on cucurbits.

== Species ==
- A. assimilis (Macquart, 1846)
- A. ayyari Ghorpadé, 1994
- A. belli Ghorpadé, 1994
- A. bhima Ghorpadé, 1994
- A. bigoti Van der Goot, 1964
- A. biroi Bezzi, 1908
- A. cingulata (Bigot, 1884)
- A. consequens (Walker, 1857)
- A. eurytaeniata Bezzi, 1908
- A. hema Ghorpadé, 1994
- A. incisuralis (Macquart, 1855)
- A. longirostris (Meijere, 1908)
- A. morokanaensis (Meijere, 1908)
- A. papuana Bezzi, 1908
- A. pitambara Ghorpadé, 1994
- A. porcina (Coquillett, 1898)
- A. pura (Curran, 1928)
- A. ribbei Bezzi, 1908
- A. rostrata (Wiedemann, 1824)
- A. salviae (Fabricius, 1787)
