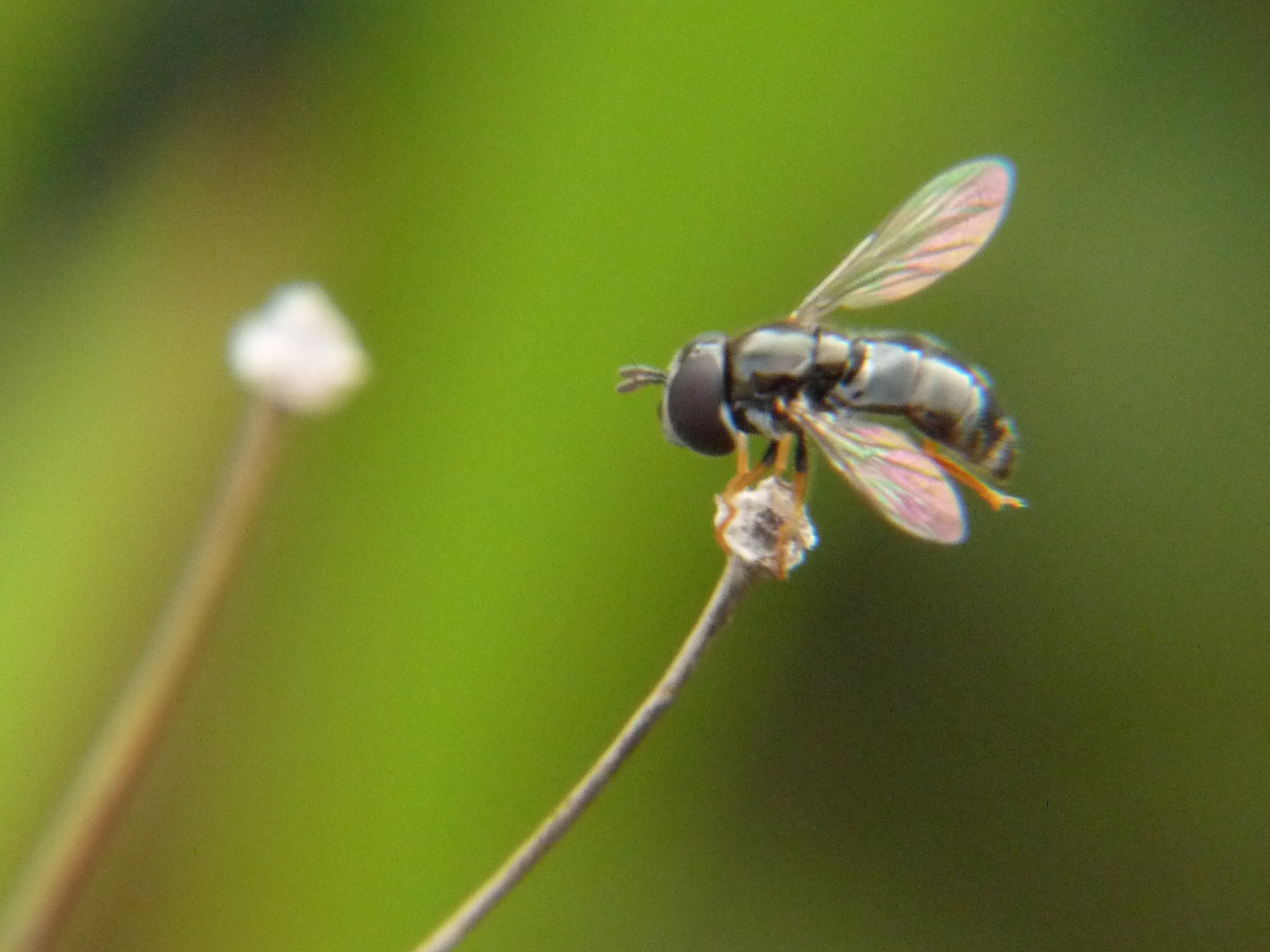

Scientific classification
- Kingdom: Animalia
- Phylum: Arthropoda
- Class: Insecta
- Order: Diptera
- Family: Syrphidae
- Tribe: Syrphini
- Genus: Betasyrphus; Matsumura, 1917

Type species
- Syrphus serarius Wiedemann, 1830

= Betasyrphus =

Genus of flies

Betasyrphus is a genus of hoverfly. The genus Betasyrphus is known from the Afrrotropical, Oriental and Palaearctic Regions. Larvae are Aphididae predators

== Species ==
- B. adligatus (Wiedemann, 1824)
- B. cinereomaculatus (Hull, 1937)
- B. claripennis (Loew, 1858)
- B. eutaeniatus (Bezzi, 1915)
- B. hirticeps (Loew, 1858)
- B. inflaticornis (Bezzi, 1915)
- B. intersectus (Wiedemann, 1824)
- B. luci (Curran, 1938)
- B. saundersi (Goot, 1964)
- B. serarius (Wiedemann, 1830)
- B. stuckenbergi (Keiser, 1971)
