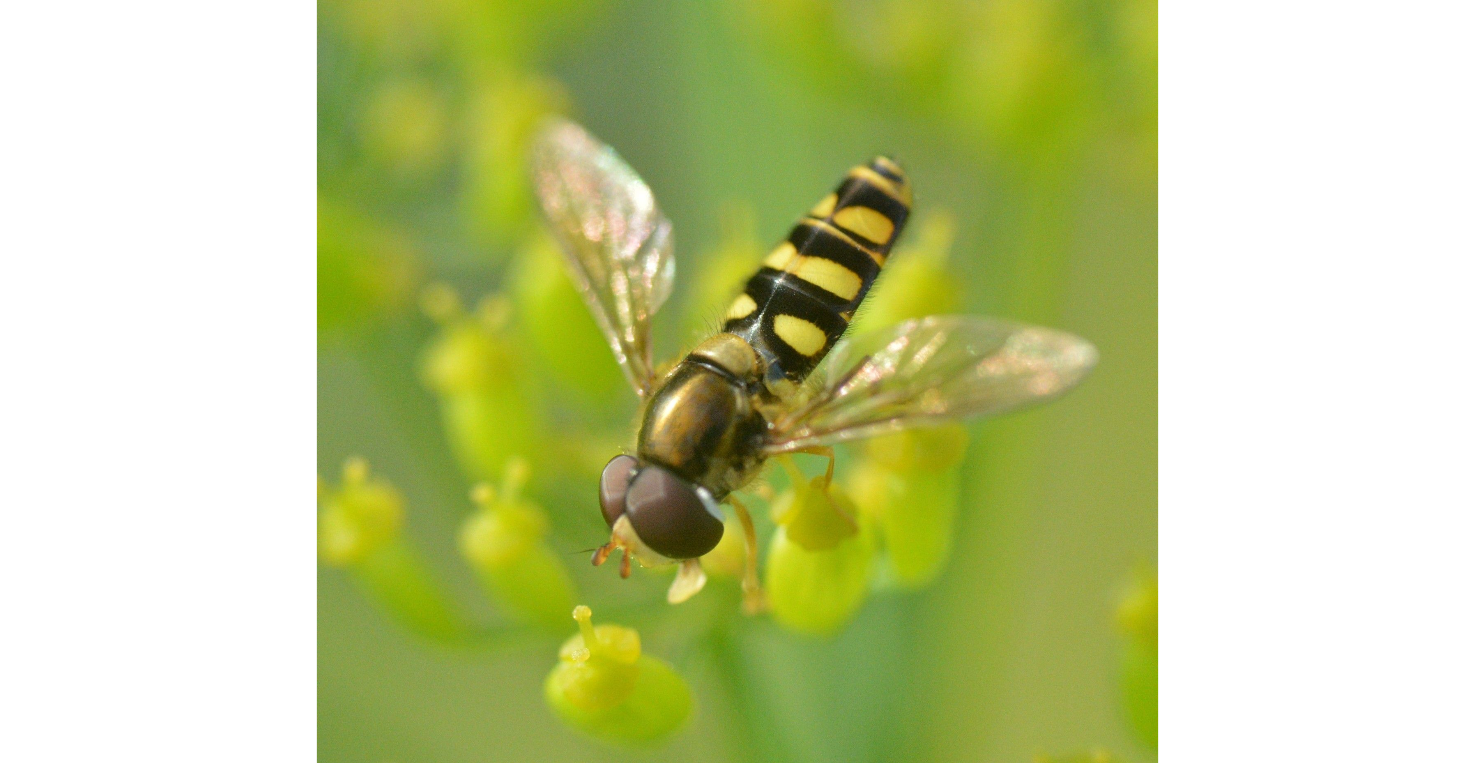

Scientific classification
- Kingdom: Animalia
- Phylum: Arthropoda
- Clade: Pancrustacea
- Class: Insecta
- Order: Diptera
- Family: Syrphidae
- Genus: Epistrophella
- Species: E. emarginata

Binomial name
- Epistrophella emarginata (Say, 1823)

Synonyms
- Scaeva emarginata Say, 1823; Syrphus disjectus Williston, 1887; Syrphus disjunctus Williston, 1882; Syrphus infuscatus Fluke, 1931; Syrphus invigorus Curran, 1921; Syrphus maculifrons Bigot, 1884; Syrphus weborgi Fluke, 1931; Xanthogramma aenea Jones, 1907; Xanthogramma divisa Williston, 1882; Xanthogramma felix Osten Sacken, 1875

= Epistrophella emarginata =

Species of fly

Epistrophella emarginata is a common North American species of hoverfly. Its larvae are aphid predators. When laying eggs, the female oviposits on the petioles of a leaf.
