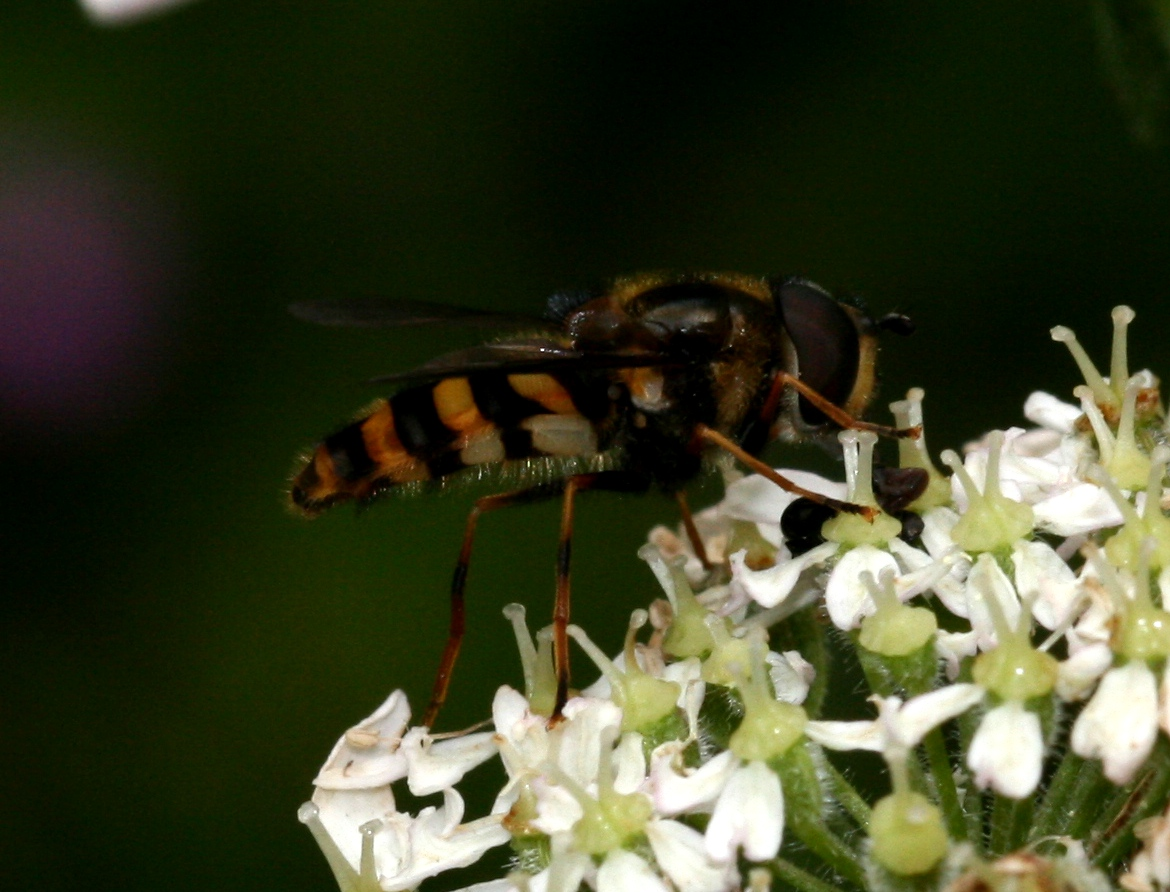
- Megasyrphus erraticus male

Scientific classification
- Kingdom: Animalia
- Phylum: Arthropoda
- Class: Insecta
- Order: Diptera
- Family: Syrphidae
- Genus: Megasyrphus
- Species: M. erraticus

Binomial name
- Megasyrphus erraticus (Linnaeus, 1758)

Synonyms
- Megasyrphus annulipes; Musca erratica Linnaeus, 1758

= Megasyrphus erraticus =

Species of fly

Megasyrphus erraticus is a Holarctic species of hoverfly associated with mature conifer woodlands and plantations.

== Description ==
External images For terms see Morphology of Diptera
M. erraticus is a large (10–15 mm. wing length) wasp mimic with a yellow pattern. The thoracic dorsum is blackish and shiny, in contrast to the greenish dorsum of most species of Syrphus and Epistrophe. Without long, dense hairs. Scutellum yellow. Wing clear, without dark patch. Face with a black middle line. Frontal lunule black. Hind tibiae with black ring after middle. The male genitalia and larva is figured by Dusek and Laska (1967).

== Distribution ==
Palaearctic and Nearctic. Fennoscandia South to the Pyrenees. Ireland East to Central Europe and the Alps and Apennines (becomes increasingly montane toward southern parts of its range). Then European Russia and the Russian Far East, Siberia to the Pacific coast (Sakhalin and Kunashir islands) Also in the Himalayas (Nepal). In North America from Alaska to Mexico.

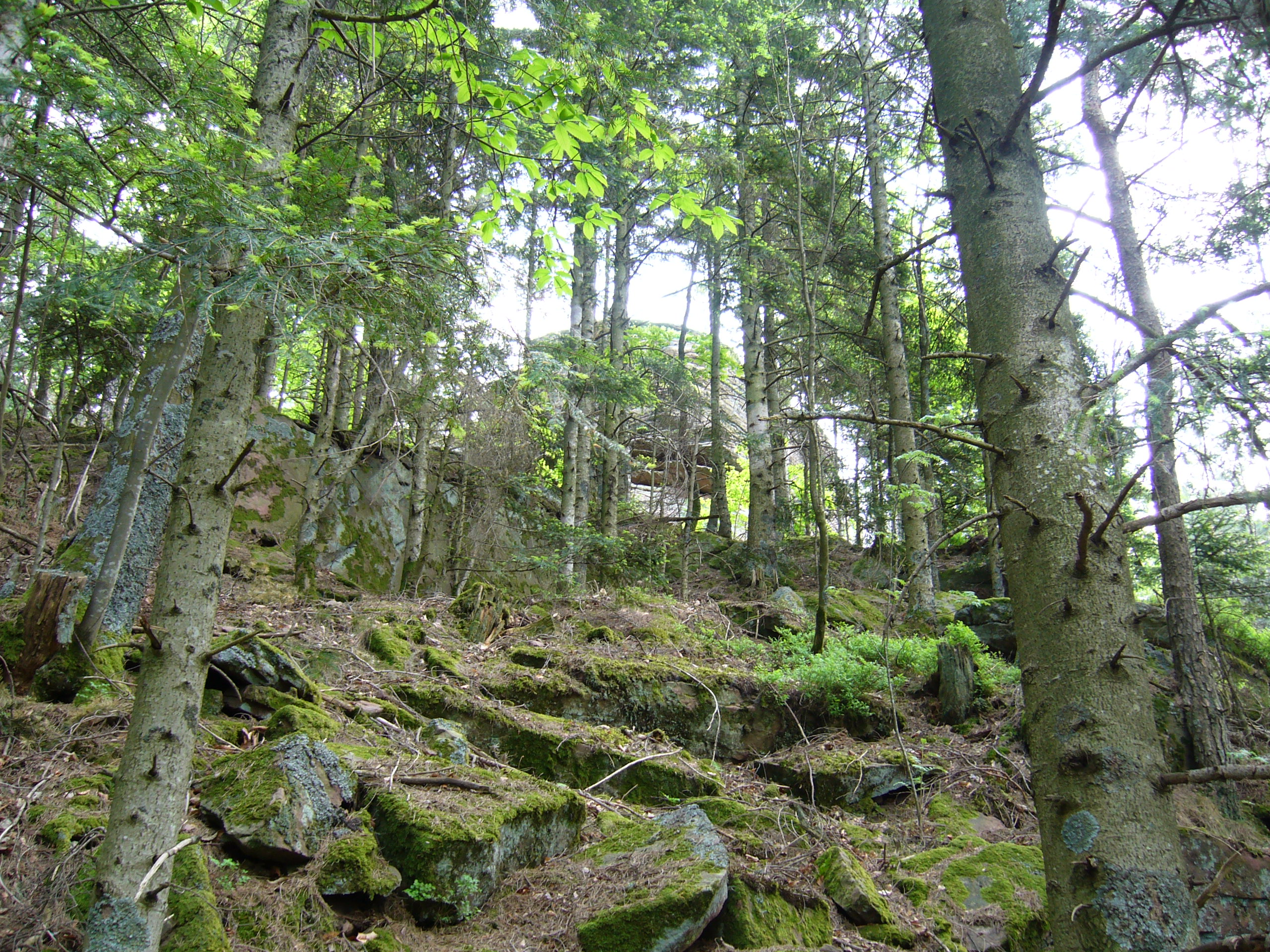
Habitat in France

== Biology ==
Habitat is Abies, Picea, Pinus forest. Arboreal, descending to visit flowers including yellow composites; white umbellifers, Bellis, Calluna vulgaris, Cardamine pratense, Cirsium vulgare, Crataegus, Epilobium angustifolium, Euphorbia hyberna, Geranium, Lonicera periclymenum, Prunus spinosa, Ranunculus, Rubus idaeus, Rubus fruticosus, Salix, Sorbus aucuparia, Stellaria, Veronica, Viburnum. The flight period is May to July. The larvae feed on aphids.
