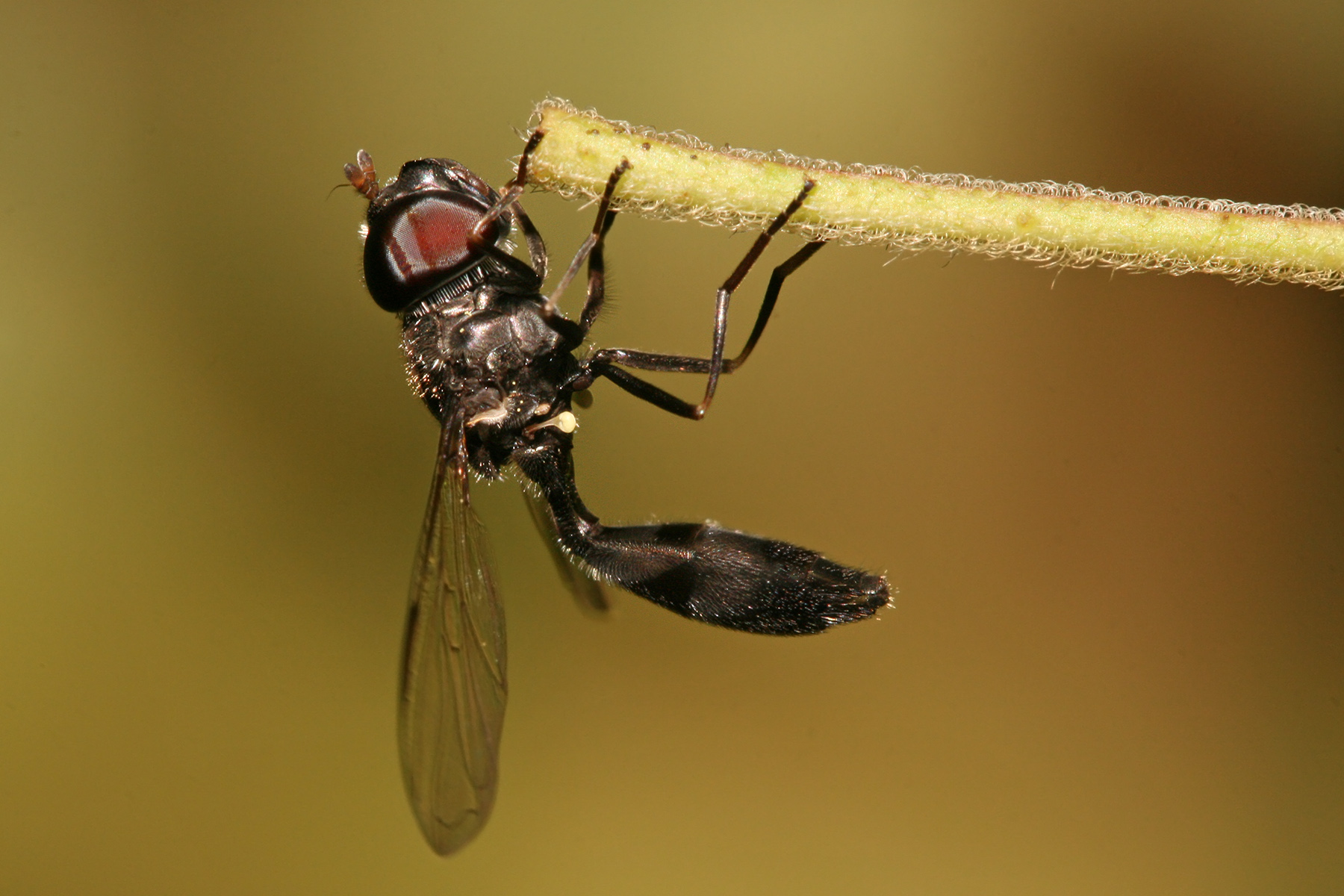

Scientific classification
- Kingdom: Animalia
- Phylum: Arthropoda
- Class: Insecta
- Order: Diptera
- Family: Syrphidae
- Tribe: Syrphini
- Genus: Allobaccha
- Species: A. bequaerti

Binomial name
- Allobaccha bequaerti (Curran, 1929)

Synonyms
- Baccha bequaerti Curran, 1929

= Allobaccha bequaerti =

Species of fly

Allobaccha bequaerti is a species of hoverfly.

== Distribution ==
Cameroun.
