= Notosyrphus =

Scientific classification
- Kingdom: Animalia
- Phylum: Arthropoda
- Clade: Pancrustacea
- Class: Insecta
- Order: Diptera
- Family: Syrphidae
- Tribe: Syrphini
- Genus: Notosyrphus; Vockeroth, 1969

Genus of flies

Notosyrphus is a genus of hoverflies. They are distributed in: Brazil (São Paulo, Santa Catarina, Parana), Argentina (Tucuman, La Rioja).

== Species ==
- N. golbachi Vockeroth, 1969
