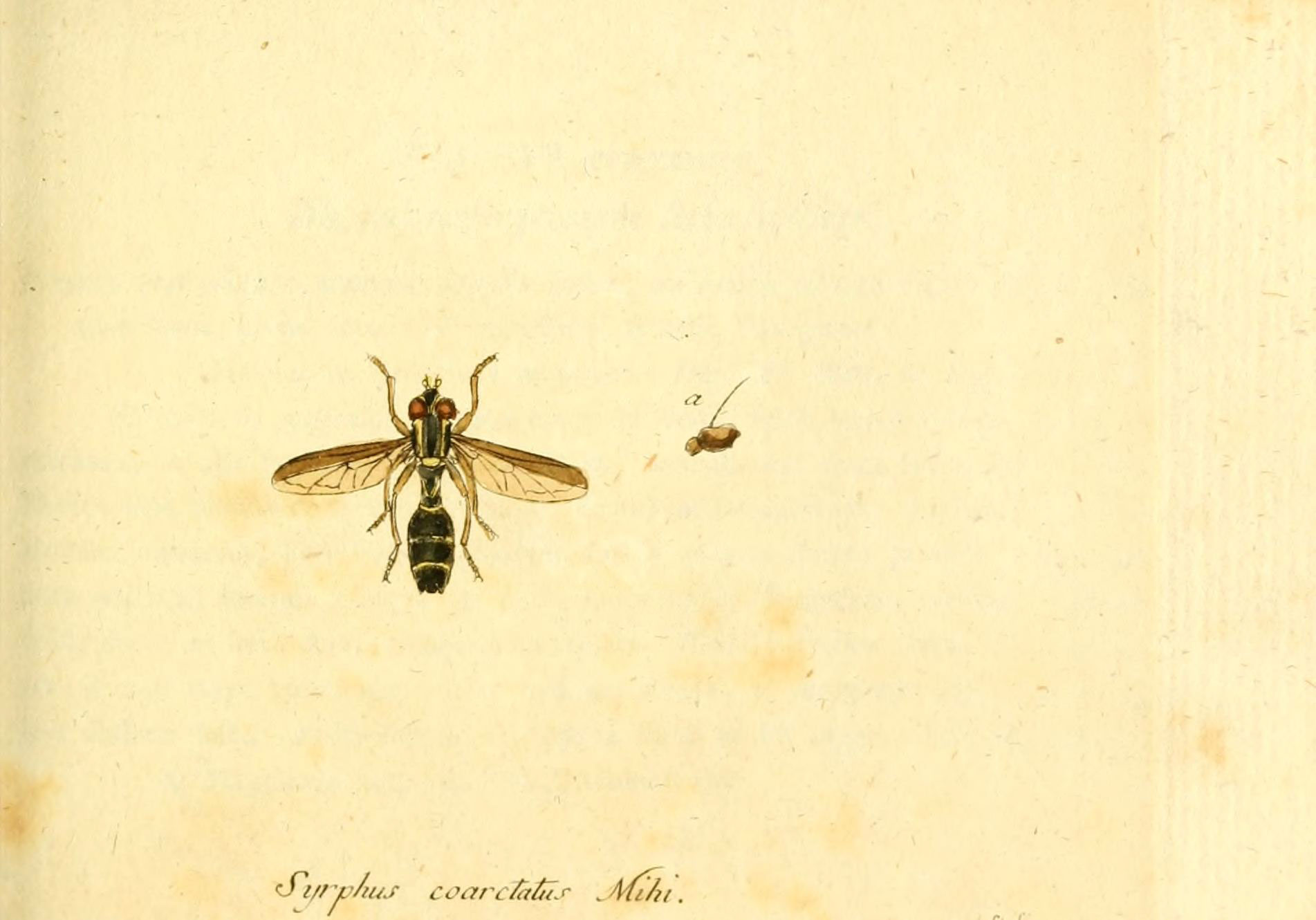
- Doros profuges depicted in Fauna Germanica
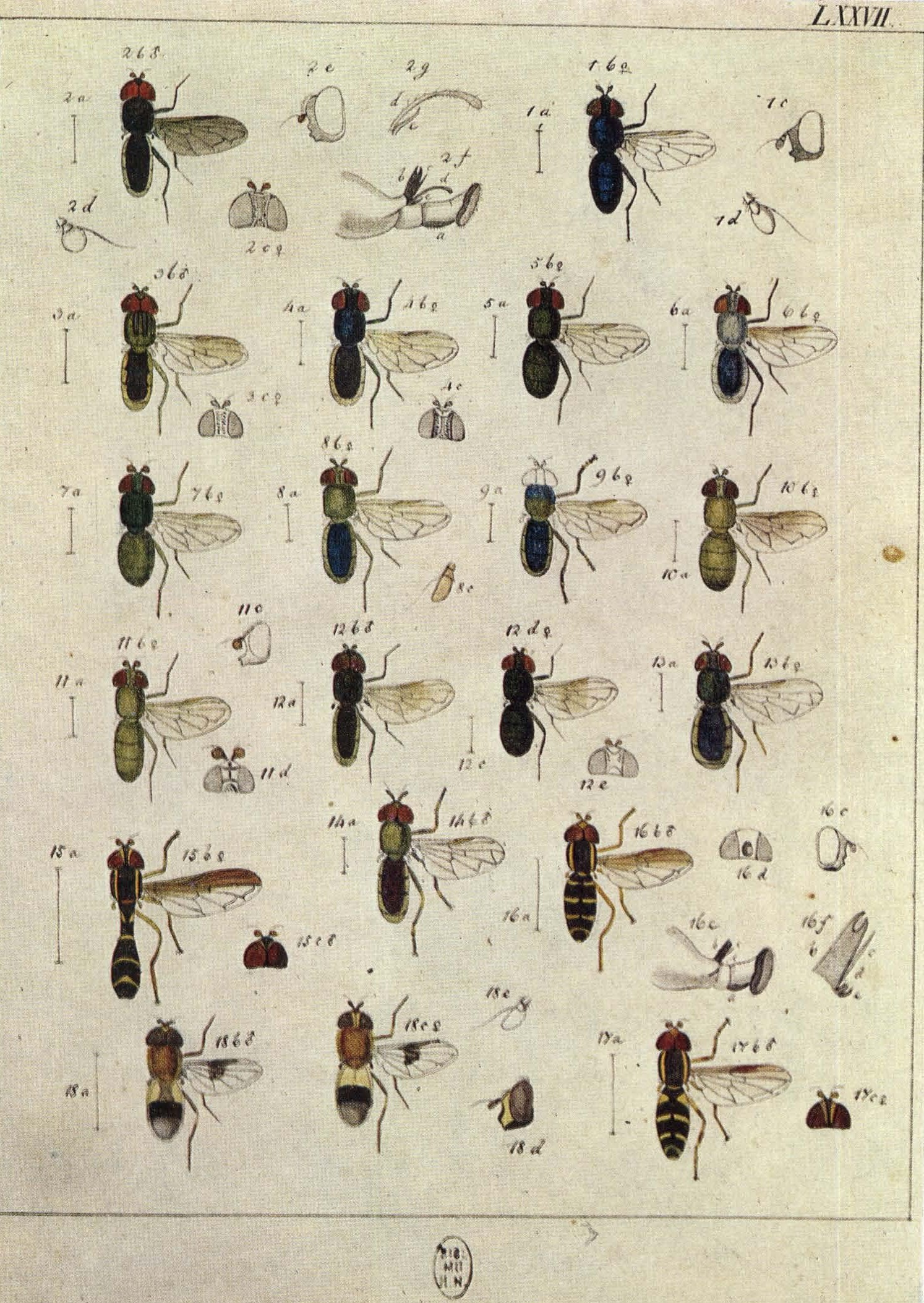
- Doros profuges as Syrphus conopseus in Meigen Europäischen Zweiflügeligen (figure 15)

Scientific classification
- Kingdom: Animalia
- Phylum: Arthropoda
- Clade: Pancrustacea
- Class: Insecta
- Order: Diptera
- Family: Syrphidae
- Genus: Doros
- Species: D. profuges

Binomial name
- Doros profuges (Harris, 1780)

Synonyms
- Musca profugus Harris, 1775(?); (Syrphus conopseus Fabricius, 1775, ? - questionable synonym as potentially later misidentifications).; Syrphus coarctatus Panzer, 1797; Doros conopeus Zeller, 1842 [emendation]; Doros bipunctatus Mik, 1885; Bacchiopsis vespiformis Matsumura, 1916

= Doros profuges =

Species of fly

Doros profuges is a Palearctic species of hoverfly.

== Description ==
External images For terms see Morphology of Diptera

The wing length is 11·25-13·25 mm. Large fly resembling a wasp. Strikingly petiolate abdomen and dark costal margin of wing. Abdomen with 3 yellow bands, thorax black with yellow bands at the sides. The male genitalia are figured by Vockeroth (1969).

== Distribution ==
Palaearctic South Fennoscandia southwards to central Spain. Ireland east through Central and South Europe and on through Russia and the Russian Far East to the Pacific coast and Japan and South into China.

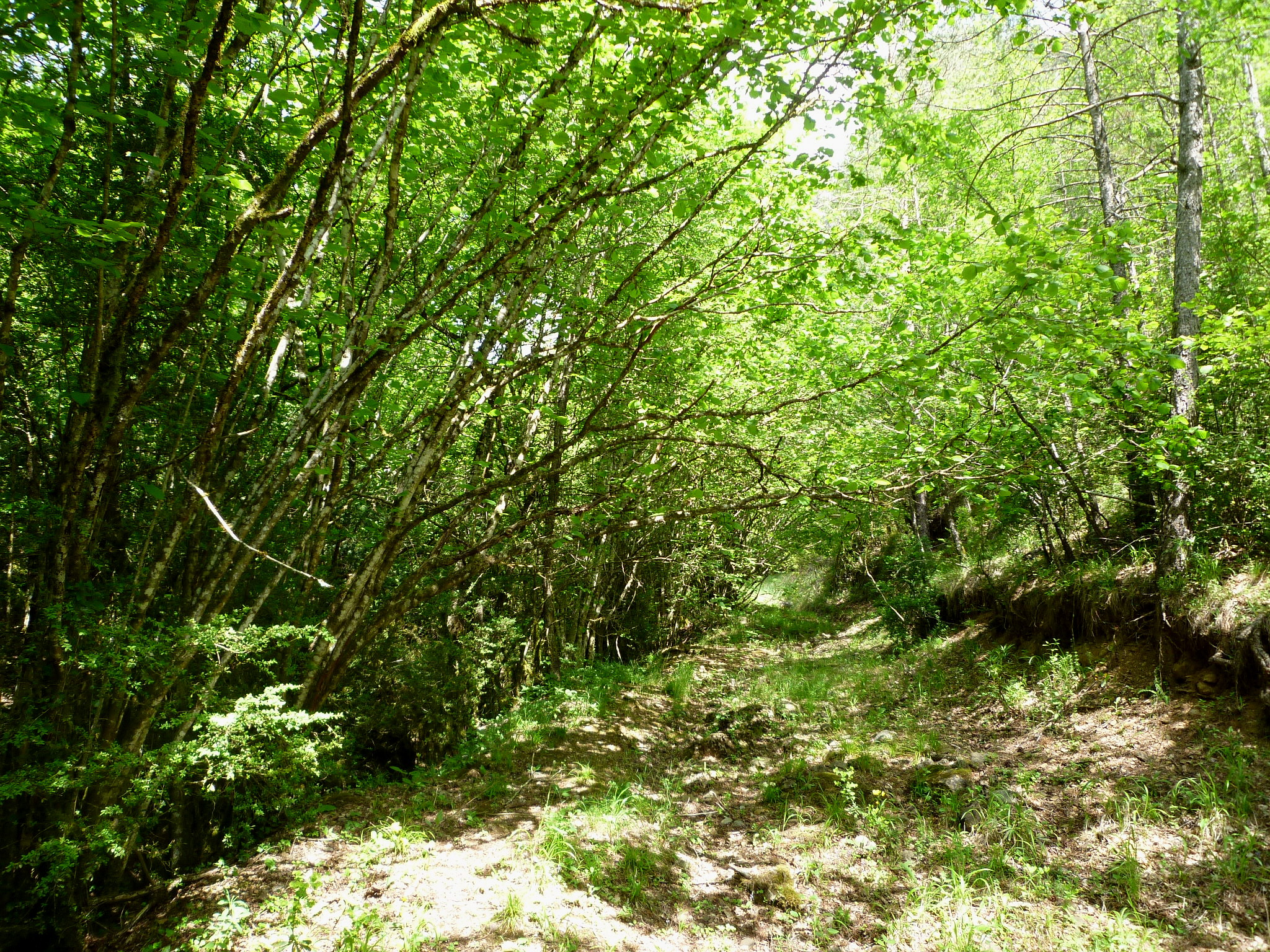
Corylus habitat in Spain

== Biology ==
Occurs particularly in woodlands, on rotten tree-trunks, and on trunks from which sap is flowing. The habitat is oak and ash woodland and hazel scrub, unimproved pastures invaded by scrub (including Rubus and yew). Arboreal and elusive. In open terrain adults fly along the edge of scrub, often around Rubus fruticosus thickets, on which they settle. Flowers visited include umbellifers, ox-eye daisy, dropwort, Rubus.

The flight period is short - from the end of May into June (July at high altitudes). The larva is believed to be an ant commensal.
