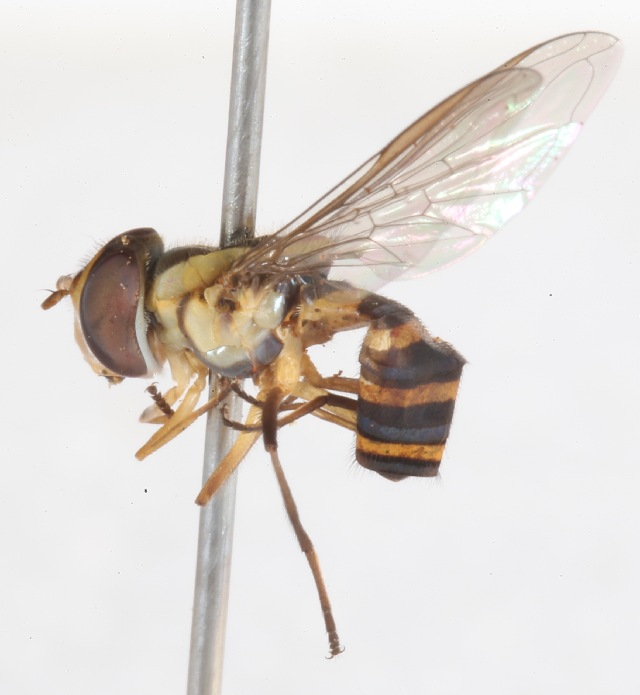

Scientific classification
- Kingdom: Animalia
- Phylum: Arthropoda
- Class: Insecta
- Order: Diptera
- Family: Syrphidae
- Genus: Citrogramma
- Species: C. australe

Binomial name
- Citrogramma australe Thompson, 2012

= Citrogramma australe =

Genus of flies

Citrogramma australe is a species of fly found along the Southeastern coast of Queensland, Australia. Only the male of this species has been identified. Larvae of this group are commonly predators of small insects especially aphids. The adults feed on nectar and pollen of flowers from which they get the common name flower flies. They have a distinctive hovering ability that gives it another common name hoverflies.

== Description ==
Speight key to genera and glossary or glossary of morphological terms

=== Length ===
8.0–8.3 mm (0.31–0.33 in)

=== Head ===
The face is yellow and covered with yellow pile. It features a small facial tubercle that has a thin dark medial vitta, which extends from the oral apex to the antennal base.The gena is yellow with a yellow pile that becomes white posteriorly.Lunules are yellow. Eyes of male are Holoptic. The Frontal Triangle is yellow with Black pile. The Vertical Triangle is black.The antenna is dark yellowish with black pile on the scape and pedicel. The basoflagellomere is orange and darker on the dorsal side. The arista is dark. The occiput has a black ground color that is predominantly silver pollinose, with golden pollinosity present dorsally. It features pale pile on the ventral two-thirds and dark pile on the dorsal third.

=== Thorax ===
The scutum is black with a dorsomedial grey pollinose area that has metallic iridescence, forming two anteroposterior vittae. There is a broad lateral yellow vitta, and the surface is black pilose dorsally, with yellow pilose laterally on the yellow vitta. The lateral notopleuron and supra-alar area are densely yellowish pilose. The notopleuron is yellow, continuing until the scutellum, which is yellow laterally and anteriorly! The scutellum has a medial dark macula that does not reach the anterior margin, accompanied by an anterior yellow fascia. It may only have a diffuse brownish macula, but it never reaches the anterior scutellar margin.

=== Wings ===
Wing membrane brown, entirely microtrichose!

=== Legs ===
All legs are covered in black pile except the coxae, which have yellow pile. The fore legs, or pro legs, have yellow coxae and trochanters. The femur and tibia are yellow. The basotarsomere has a yellow-brown basal portion and a dark distal portion. The other tarsi are black. The meso legs have coxae and trochanters that are brownish yellow. The femur is yellow, with a brownish color on the distal one-fifth or less. The tibia is yellow. The basotarsomere consists of a yellow-brown basal portion and a distal portion that is dark. The other tarsi are black. The meta legs have black femurs with brown only very basally. They feature short, strong, setulose hairs on the anteroventral and posteroventral sides near the apex. The tibia and tarsi are black. Abdomen: Tergum 1 is entirely black. Tergum 2 is black and features two mesolateral triangular yellow maculae, along with a yellow lateral margin on the anterior half. Terga 3 and 4 are black, each with a medial broad yellow fascia that extends for about half the length of the tergum, where the anterior margin is parallel to the tergal margin and the posterior margin is concave. Tergum 5 is black and similar to terga 3 and 4, except that the medial yellow fascia is narrowed dorsomedially.

Female: Unknown

[2]
