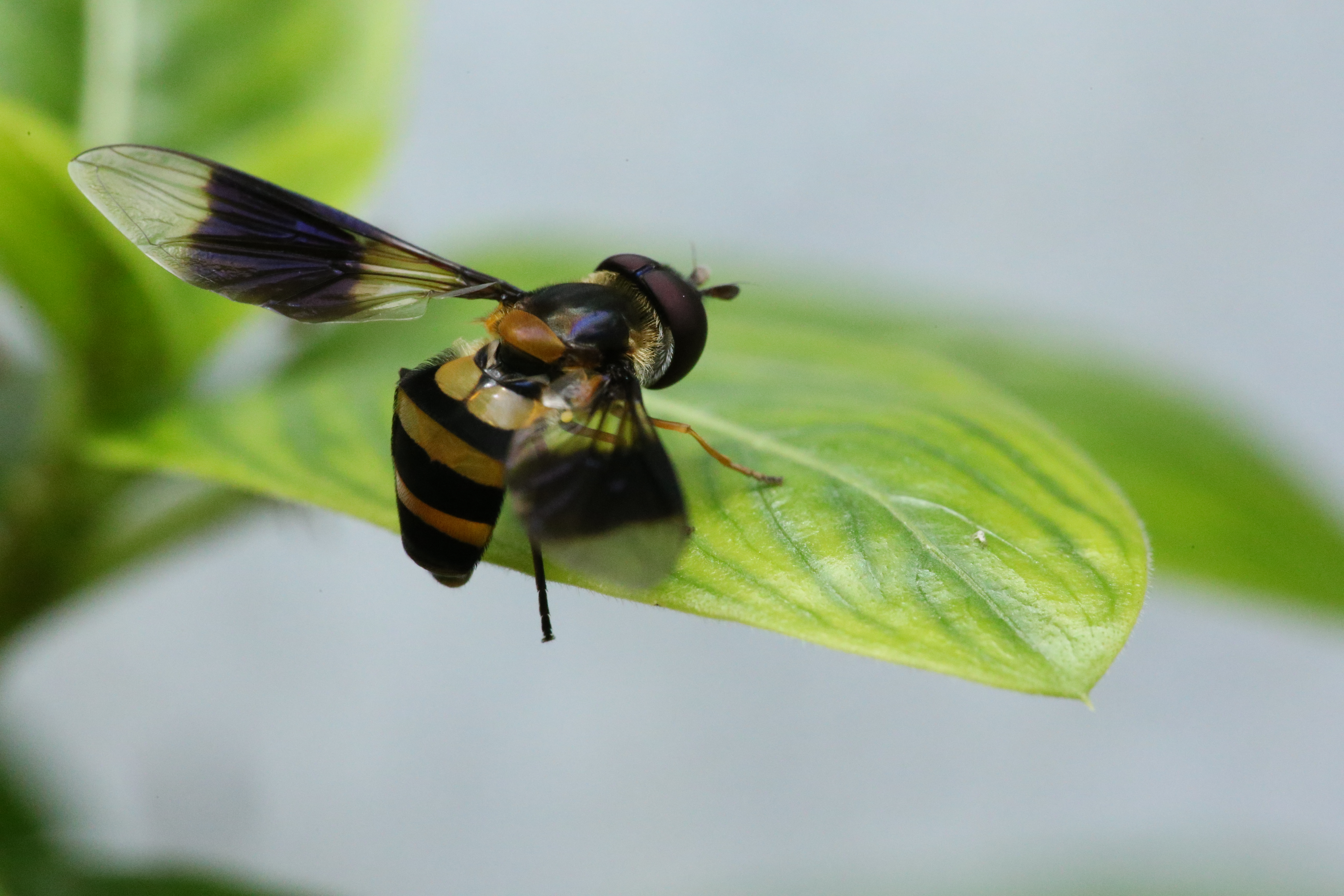

Scientific classification
- Kingdom: Animalia
- Phylum: Arthropoda
- Clade: Pancrustacea
- Class: Insecta
- Order: Diptera
- Family: Syrphidae
- Genus: Dideopsis
- Species: D. aegrota

Binomial name
- Dideopsis aegrota (Fabricius, 1805)

Synonyms
- Eristalis aegrotus

= Dideopsis aegrota =

Species of hover fly

Dideopsis aegrota is a species of hover fly in the family Syrphidae. It is found in South Korea, China, India, Indonesia, Sri Lanka, Nepal, as well as eastern Australia.

Larvae of this species feed on aphids, and consume about 400 in their life.

== Description ==
D. aegrota is a large hover fly. It has dark red eyes and a dark scutum. Scutellum yellow and somewhat transparent. Tergite 2 with two yellowish ovals, while T3 and T4 have yellow bands. Fore and mid legs yellow, rear legs black-brown in colour. Wings dark, but with a translucent end, which distinguishes it from other hover flies.

== Biology ==
Adult females live for approximately 17-23 days, laying 53-62 eggs. The overall life cycle takes up to 46 days, 6-10 of which are spent as larvae.
