= Salpingogaster punctifrons =

Scientific classification
- Domain: Eukaryota
- Kingdom: Animalia
- Phylum: Arthropoda
- Class: Insecta
- Order: Diptera
- Family: Syrphidae
- Genus: Salpingogaster
- Species: S. punctifrons

Binomial name
- Salpingogaster punctifrons Curran, 1929

Species of fly

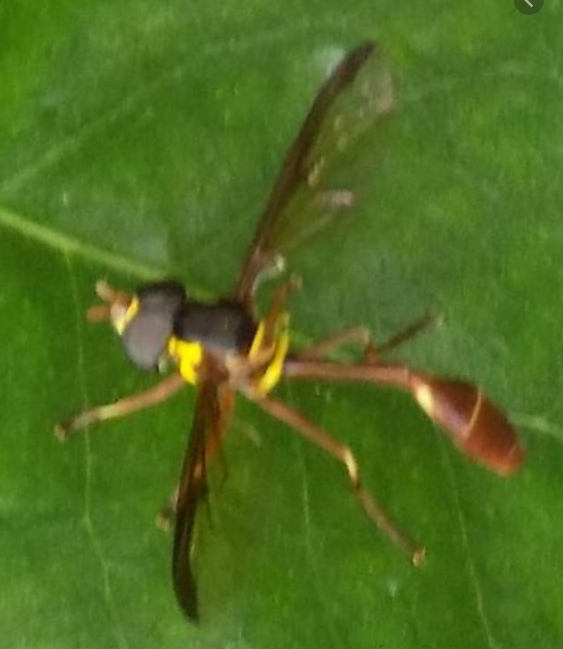
Picture from Plantation, Florida

Salpingogaster punctifrons is a species of syrphid fly in the family Syrphidae. This is an elusive red, black, and yellow species found in South and Central Florida. Like many hoverflies, this species imitates wasps, this one being particularly similar to mud daubers. Their anatomy is distinctive from many other hoverflies and similar to that of mud daubers in that its first abdominal tergite is elongated.
