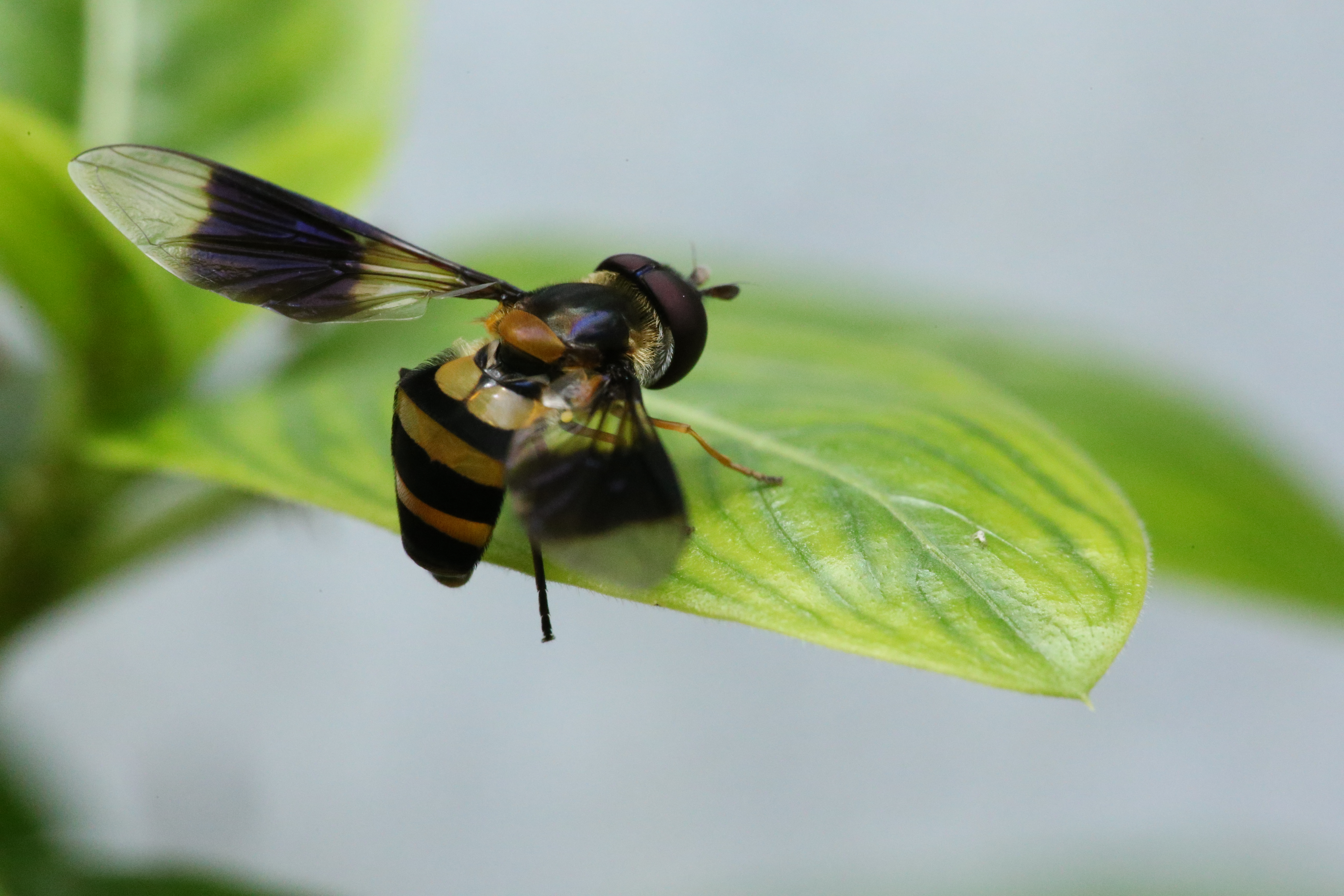
- Dideopsis aegrota

Scientific classification
- Kingdom: Animalia
- Phylum: Arthropoda
- Class: Insecta
- Order: Diptera
- Family: Syrphidae
- Tribe: Syrphini
- Genus: Dideopsis; Matsumura, 1917

= Dideopsis =

Genus of flies

Dideopsis is a monotypic genus of hoverflies found in Asia and Australasia.

== Species ==
- Dideopsis aegrota (Fabricius, 1805)
