= Salpingogaster =

Scientific classification
- Kingdom: Animalia
- Phylum: Arthropoda
- Class: Insecta
- Order: Diptera
- Family: Syrphidae
- Tribe: Syrphini
- Genus: Salpingogaster; Schiner, 1868

Genus of flies

Salpingogaster is a genus of syrphid flies in the family Syrphidae. There are at least 30 described species in Salpingogaster.

== Species ==
These 30 species belong to the genus Salpingogaster:

- S. abdominalis (Sack, 1920)^{c}
- S. bequaerti Curran, 1933^{c g}
- S. bicolor Sack, 1920^{c g}
- S. bipunctifrons Curran, 1934^{c g}
- S. browni Curran, 1941^{c g}
- S. bruneri Curran, 1932^{c g}
- S. cochenillivorus (Guerin-Meneville, 1848)^{c g}
- S. conopida (Philippi, 1865)^{c g}
- S. cornuta Hull, 1944^{c g}
- S. costalis (Walker, 1852)^{c}
- S. cothurnata Bigot, 1884^{c g}
- S. diana Hull, 1943^{c g}
- S. frontalis Sack, 1920^{c g}
- S. gracilis Sack, 1920^{c g}
- S. impura Curran, 1941^{c g}
- S. limbipennis Williston, 1891^{c g}
- S. lineata Sack, 1920^{c g}
- S. liposeta Fluke, 1937^{c g}
- S. minor Austen, 1893^{c g}
- S. nepenthe (Hull, 1943)^{i c g}
- S. nigra Schiner, 1868
- S. nigricauda Sack, 1920^{c g}
- S. nova Giglio-Tos, 1892^{c g}
- S. petiolata Hull, 1944^{c g}
- S. punctifrons Curran, 1929^{i c g b}
- S. pygophora Schiner, 1868
- S. stigmatipennis Hull, 1940^{c g}
- S. texana Curran, 1932^{i}
- S. uncinata Hull, 1945^{c g}
- S. virgata Austen, 1893^{c g}

Data sources: i = ITIS, c = Catalogue of Life, g = GBIF, b = Bugguide.net
