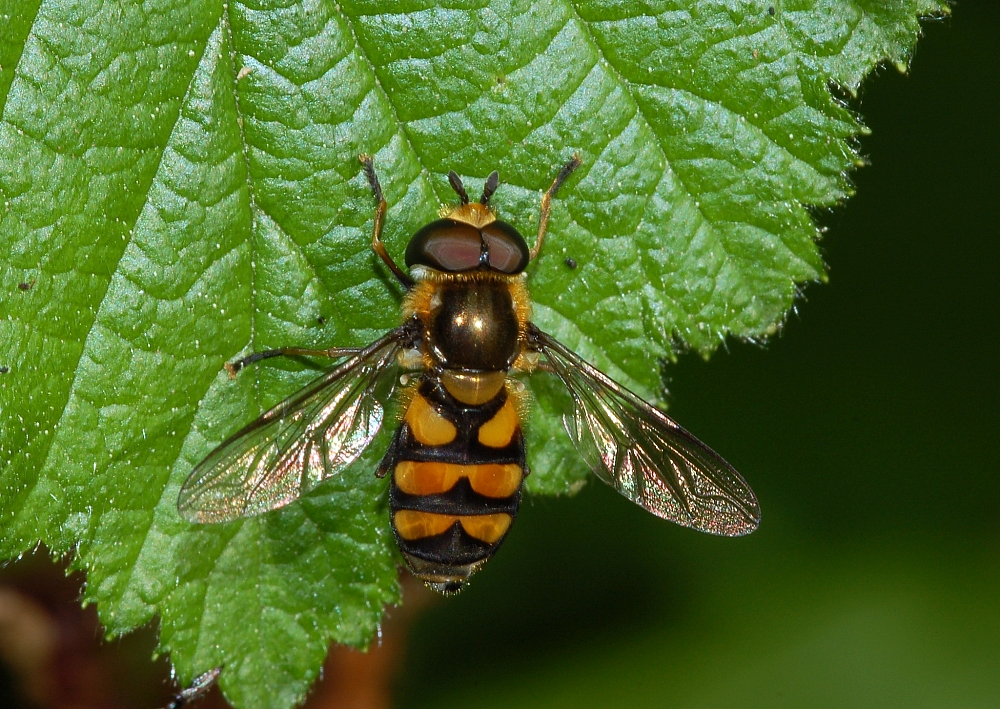
- Didea fasciata male

Scientific classification
- Kingdom: Animalia
- Phylum: Arthropoda
- Class: Insecta
- Order: Diptera
- Family: Syrphidae
- Subfamily: Syrphinae
- Tribe: Syrphini
- Genus: Didea; Macquart, 1834

= Didea =

Genus of flies

Didea, the lucent flies is a holarctic genus of black and yellow large sized flies 10–15 mm (0.39–0.59 in). belonging to the hoverfly family of Diptera. The larvae feed on aboreal aphids.

== Diagnosis ==
For terminology see Speight key to genera and glossary This genus has an abdomen that is large, broad, flat, and strongly emarginated, having narrowly divided yellow, yellow-green, or pale green bands. The scutum is black and either shining or subshining. The notopleural callus and postsutural scutal margin of some specimens are obscurely yellowish, and the ventral scutellar fringe is short and sparse. The pleura is black with densely pale-pruinose areas on the upper half, and the anterior anepisternum is bare. The upper and lower katepisternal hair patches are broadly separated, the meron is bare, and the metepisternum and metasternum both have some hairs. The R _{4+5} vein is moderately dipped into the cell r_{4+5}, and the lower calypter has very few fine, pale, erect, and scattered hairs on the upper surface. There are several hairs at the posteromedial apical angle of the hind coxa.

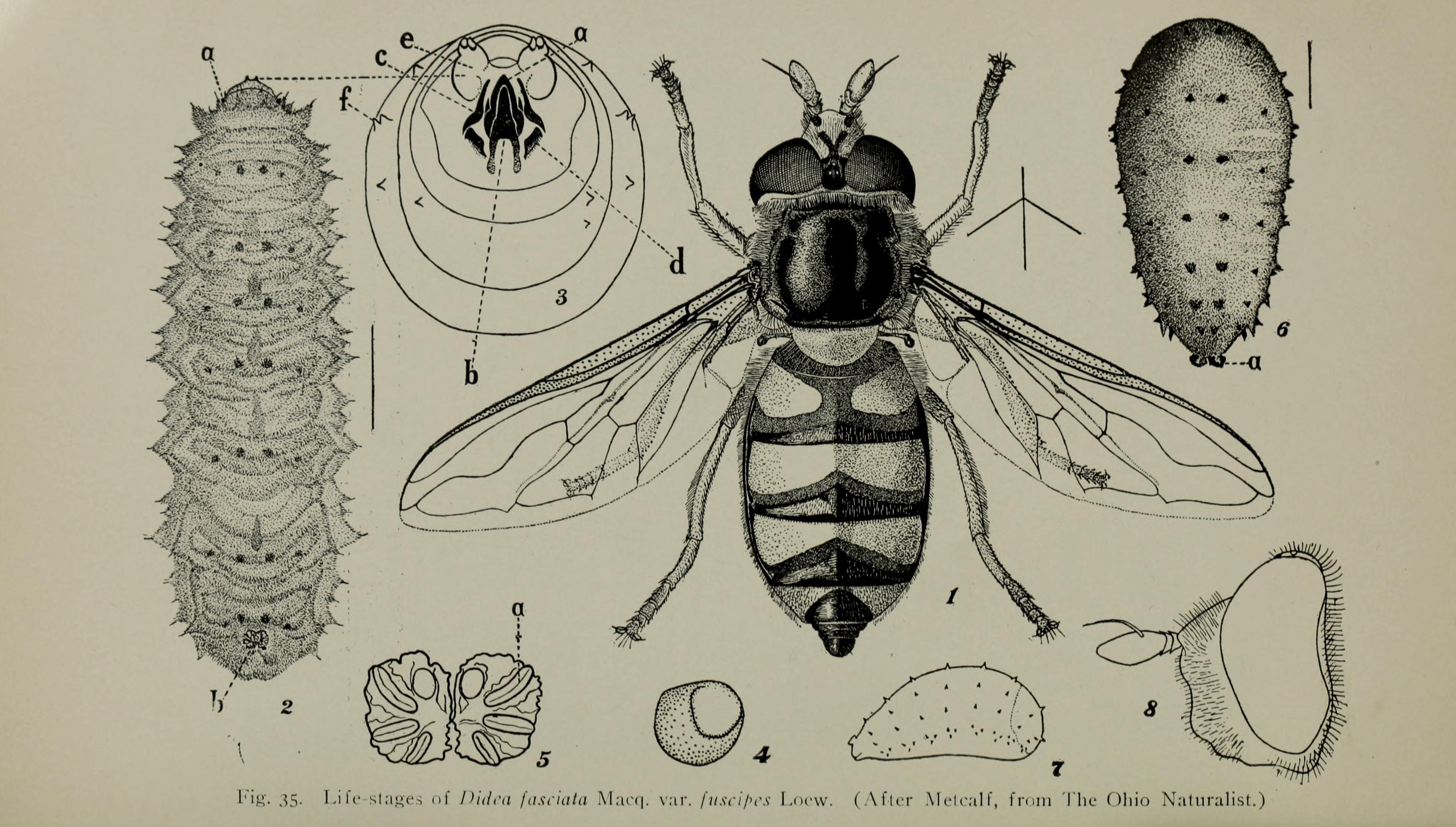
Didea fasciata Macquart, 1834

== Species ==
The following species are recognized:

- Didea alneti (Fallén, 1817)
- Didea fasciata Macquart, 1834
- Didea fuscipes Loew, 1863
- Didea intermedia Loew, 1854
- Didea poorva Ghorpadé, 1994
- Didea subalneti Claussen & Weipert, 2003
- Didea vockerothi Ghorpadé, 1994
- Didea zhongtiaoshanensis Huo & Wang, 2014
