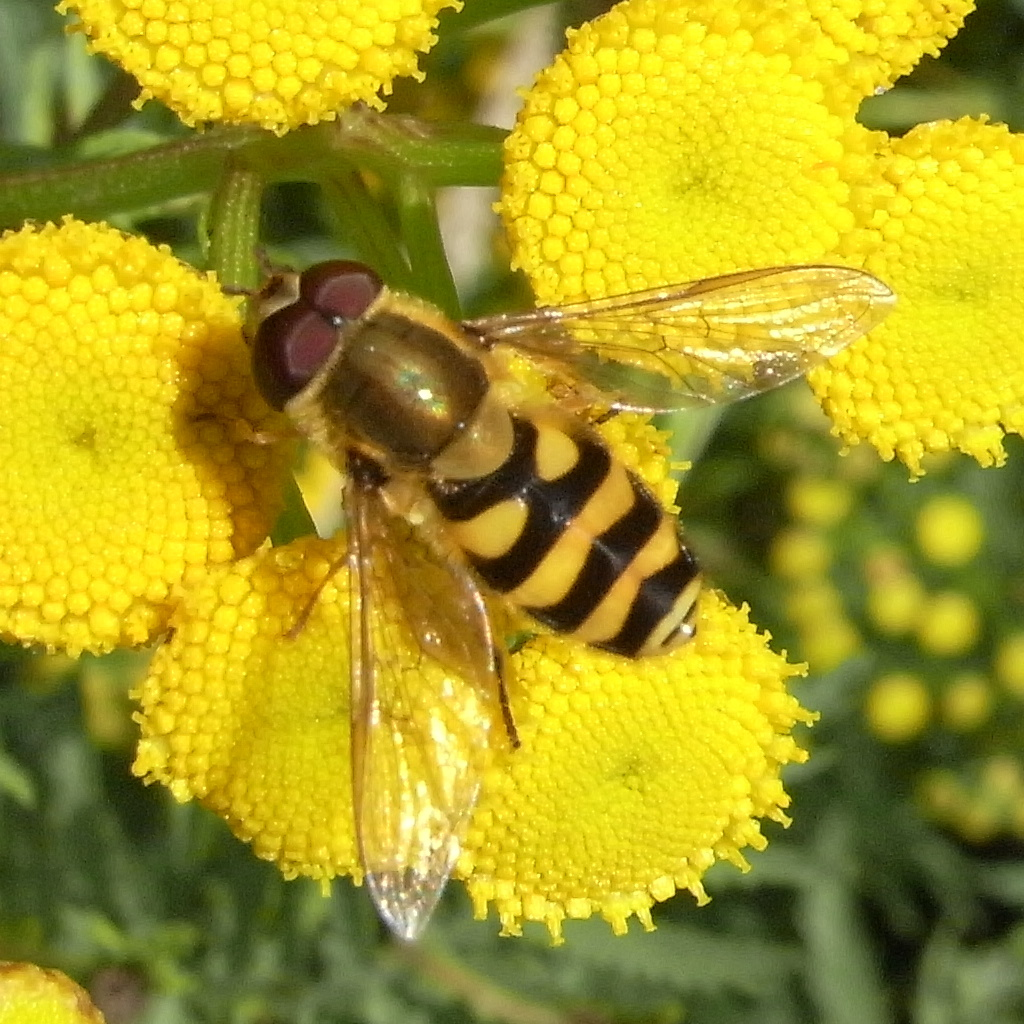
- Syrphus ribesii adult
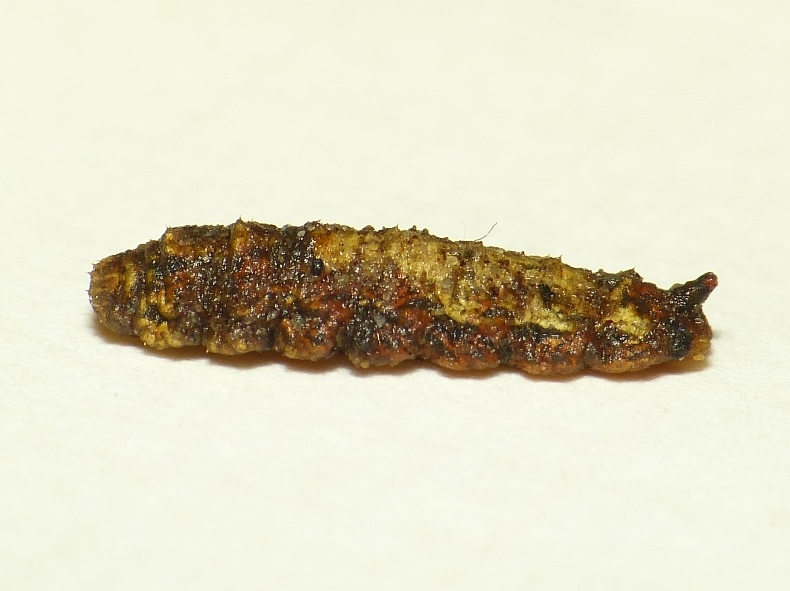
- Meligramma triangulifera larva

Scientific classification
- Kingdom: Animalia
- Phylum: Arthropoda
- Class: Insecta
- Order: Diptera
- Family: Syrphidae
- Subfamily: Syrphinae
- Tribe: Syrphini; Samouelle, 1819

Genera
- See text

= Syrphini =

Tribe of flies

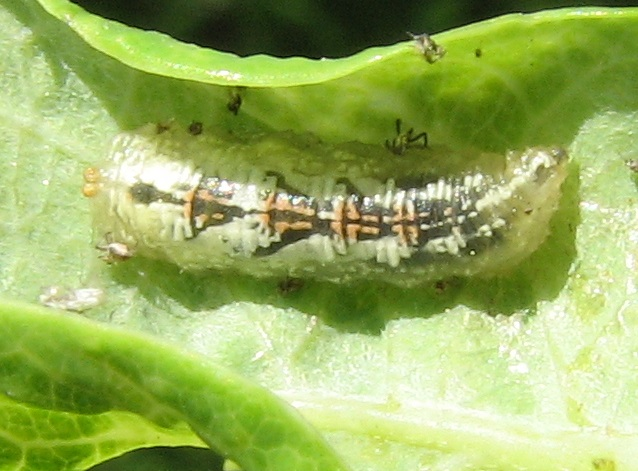
Syrphus, larva feeding on aphids.

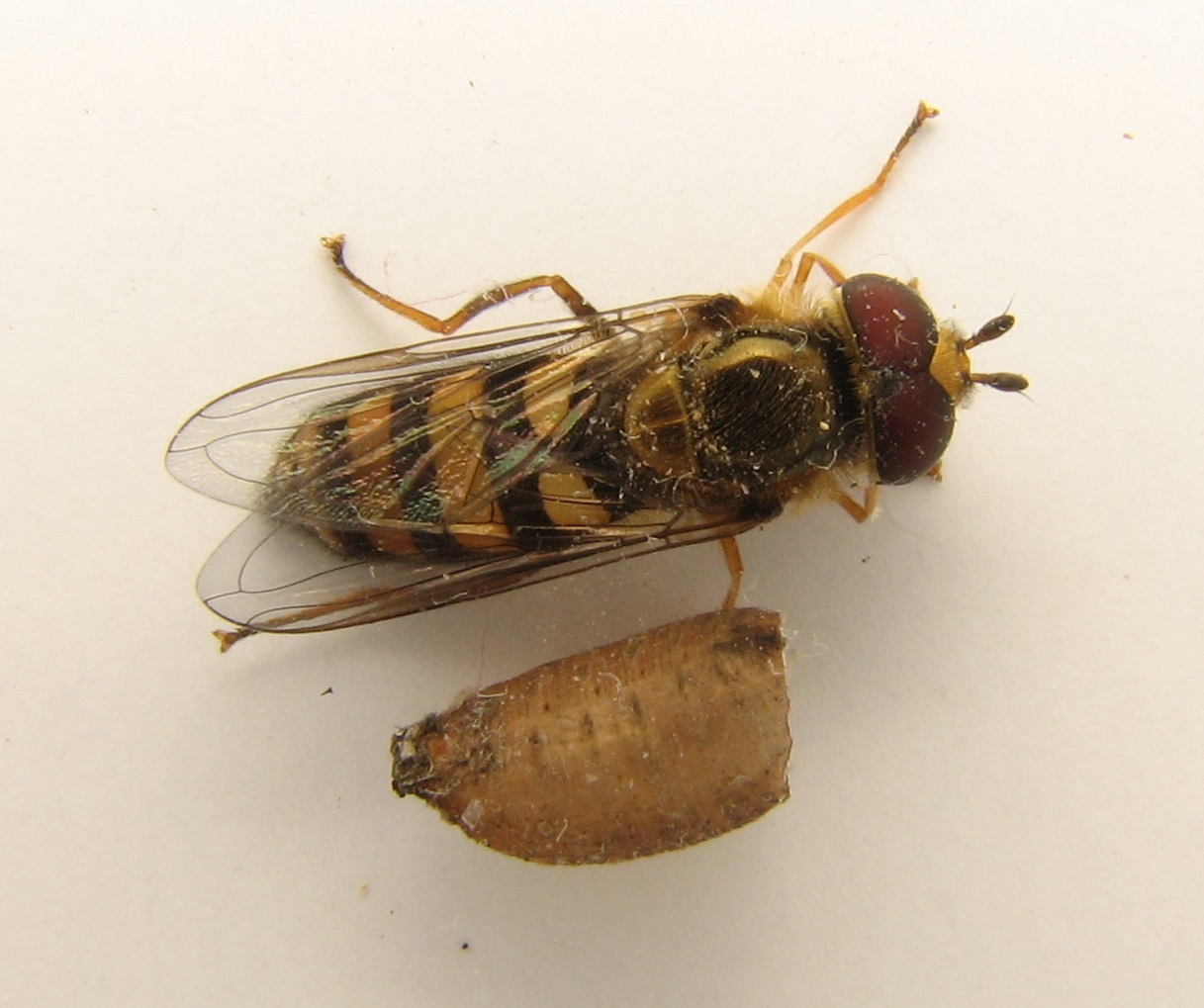
Eupeodes americanus and puparium.

The Syrphini are a tribe of hoverflies.

== List of genera ==
Relationships within this tribe were investigated by analysing and comparing genetic data. Results seem to show the members of Syrphini fall into several smaller groups or clades.

- Afrosyrphus Curran, 1927
- Agnisyrphus Ghorpade, 1994
- Allobaccha Curran, 1928
- Allograpta Osten Sacken, 1875
- Antillus Vockeroth, 1969
- Anu Thompson, 2008
- Asarkina Macquart, 1834. Subgenera: A. (Achoanus), A. (Asarkina)
- Asiodidea Stackelberg, 1930
- Betasyrphus Matsumura, 1917
- Chrysotoxum Meigen, 1803
- Citrogramma Vockeroth, 1969
- Claraplumula Shannon, 1927
- Dasysyrphus Enderlein, 1938
- Didea Macquart, 1834
- Dideomima Vockeroth, 1969
- Dideoides Brunetti, 1908
- Dideopsis Matsumura, 1917
- Dioprosopa Hull, 1949
- Doros Meigen, 1803
- Eosphaerophoria Frey, 1946
- Epistrophe Walker, 1852
- Epistrophella Dusek & Laska, 1967
- Episyrphus Matsumura & Adachi, 1917. Subgenera: E. (Asiobaccha), E. (Episyrphus)
- Eriozona Schiner, 1860
- Eupeodes Osten Sacken, 1877. Subgenera: E. (Eupeodes), E. (Macrosyrphus), E. (Metasyrphus)
- Fagisyrphus Dusek & Laska, 1967
- Fazia Shannon, 1927
- Fragosa Mengual, 2020
- Giluwea Vockeroth, 1969
- Hybobathus Enderlein, 1937
- Hypocritanus Mengual, 2020
- Ischiodon Sack, 1913
- Lamellidorsum Huo & Zheng, 2005
- Lapposyrphus Dusek & Laska, 1967
- Leucozona Schiner, 1860. Subgenera: L. (Ischyrosyrphus), L. (Leucozona)
- Maiana Mengual, 2020
- Megasyrphus Dusek & Laska, 1967
- Melangyna Verrall, 1901. Subgenera: M. (Austrosyrphus), M. (Melangyna), M. (Melanosyrphus)
- Meligramma Frey, 1946
- Meliscaeva Frey, 1946
- Notosyrphus Vockeroth, 1969
- Nuntianus Mengual, 2020
- Ocyptamus Macquart, 1834. Subgenera: O. (Ocyptamus), O. (Mimocalla), O. (Pipunculosyrphus)
- Orphnabaccha Vockeroth, 1969
- Paragus Latreille, 1804
- Parasyrphus Matsumura, 1917
- Pelecinobaccha Shannon, 1927
- Pelloloma Vockeroth, 1973
- Philhelius Stephens, 1841 (= Xanthogramma)
- Pseudodoros Becker, 1903
- Pseudoscaeva Vockeroth, 1969
- Rhinobaccha Meijere, 1908
- Rhinoprosopa Hull, 1942
- Salpingogaster Schiner, 1868. Subgenera: S. (Eosalpingogaster), S. (Salpingogaster)
- Scaeva Fabricius, 1805
- Simosyrphus Bigot, 1882
- Sphaerophoria Le Peletier & Serville, 1828. Subgenera: S. (Exallandra), S. (Loveridgeana), S. (Sphaerophoria)
- Syrphus Fabricius, 1775
- Tiquicia Thompson, 2012
- Toxomerus Macquart, 1855
- Victoriana Mengual, 2020
- Vockerothiella Ghorpade, 1994
