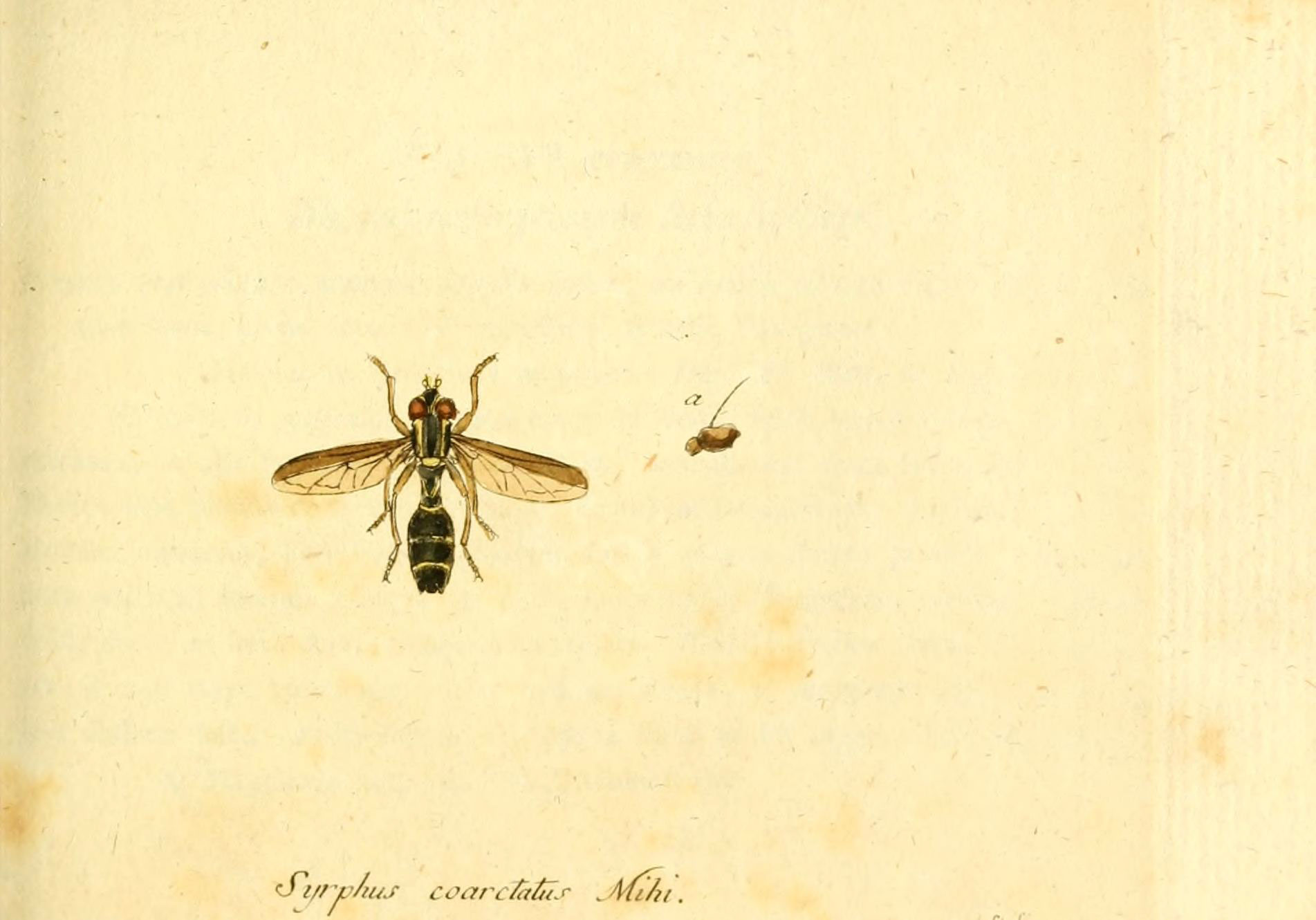
- Doros profuges depicted in Fauna Germanica

Scientific classification
- Domain: Eukaryota
- Kingdom: Animalia
- Phylum: Arthropoda
- Class: Insecta
- Order: Diptera
- Family: Syrphidae
- Subfamily: Syrphinae
- Tribe: Syrphini
- Genus: Doros; Meigen, 1803

Type species
- Syrphus conopseus Fabricius, 1775

Synonyms
- Bacchiopsis Matsumura, 1916

= Doros (fly) =

Genus of flies

Doros is a genus of hoverflies. They are large slender flies, that mimic solitary wasp in slow flight. They have very limited flight period.

== Species ==
- Doros aequalis Loew, 1863
- Doros destillatorius Mik, 1885
- Doros profuges (Harris, 1780) (*)
- Doros rohdendorfi Smirnov, 1926

(* Caution with historical usage of "Doros conopseus (Fabricius, 1775)" from misidentified material, elsewhere an unjustified emendation of Ceriana conopsoides (Linnaeus, 1758).
