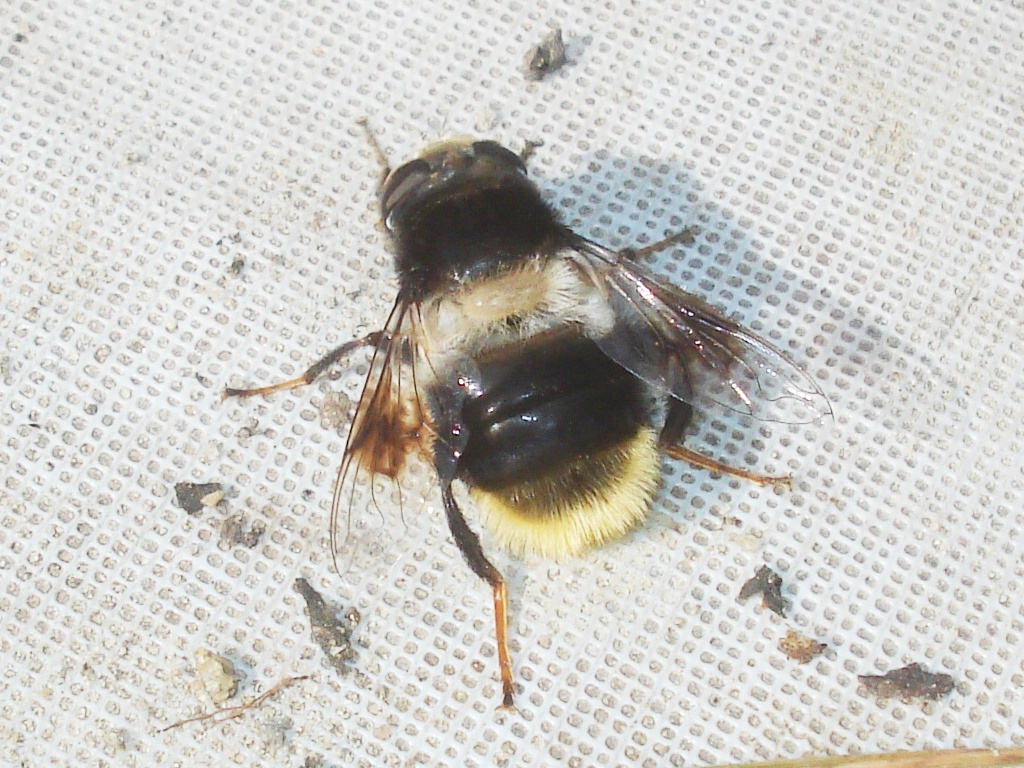
- Eriozona syrphoides

Scientific classification
- Kingdom: Animalia
- Phylum: Arthropoda
- Class: Insecta
- Order: Diptera
- Family: Syrphidae
- Subfamily: Syrphinae
- Tribe: Syrphini
- Genus: Eriozona; Schiner, 1860

= Eriozona =

Genus of flies

Eriozona is a genus of hoverflies in the subfamily Syrphinae.

== Species ==
- Eriozona analis (Kertész, 1901)
- Eriozona nigroscutellata (Shiraki, 1930)
- Eriozona syrphoides (Fallén, 1817)
- Eriozona tricolorata (Huo, Ren & Zheng, 2007)
