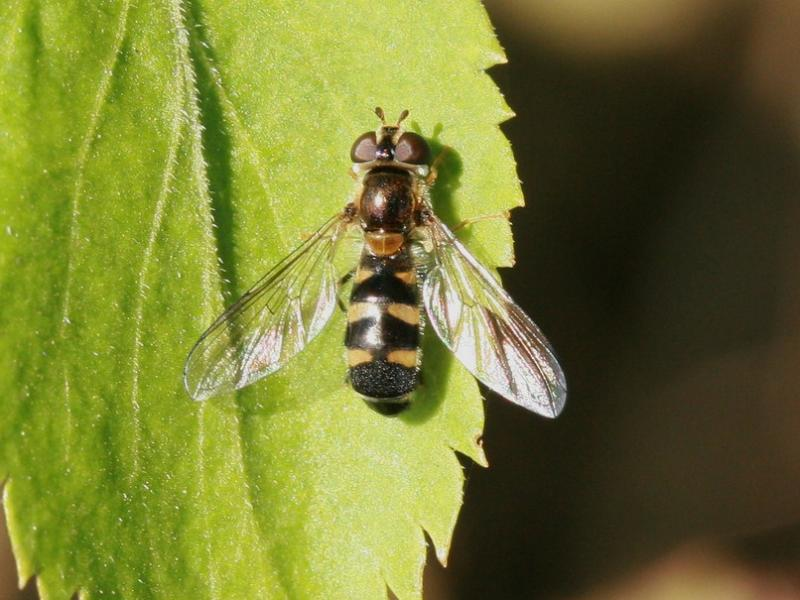

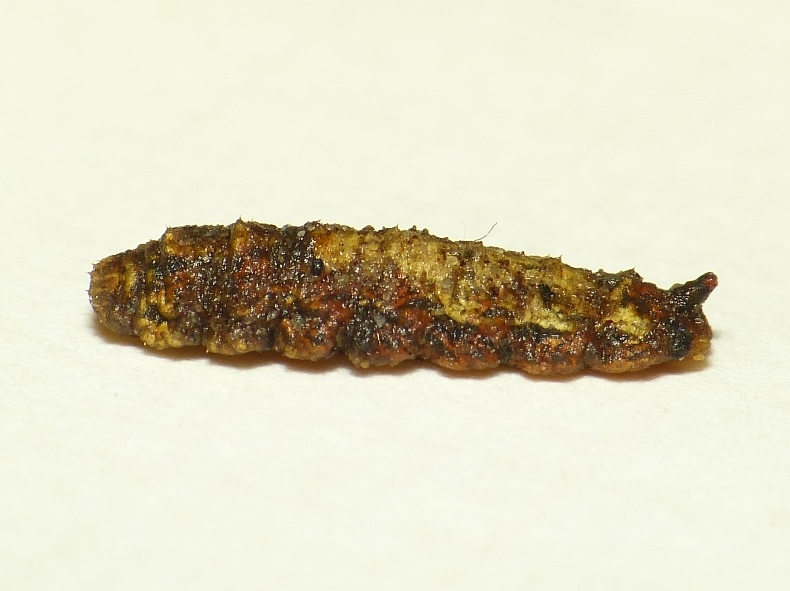
- adult and larva

Scientific classification
- Kingdom: Animalia
- Phylum: Arthropoda
- Class: Insecta
- Order: Diptera
- Family: Syrphidae
- Genus: Meligramma
- Species: M. triangulifera

Binomial name
- Meligramma triangulifera (Zetterstedt, 1843)

Synonyms

= Meligramma triangulifera =

Species of fly

Meligramma triangulifera is a European species of hoverfly. It was described by Zetterstedt in 1843.
