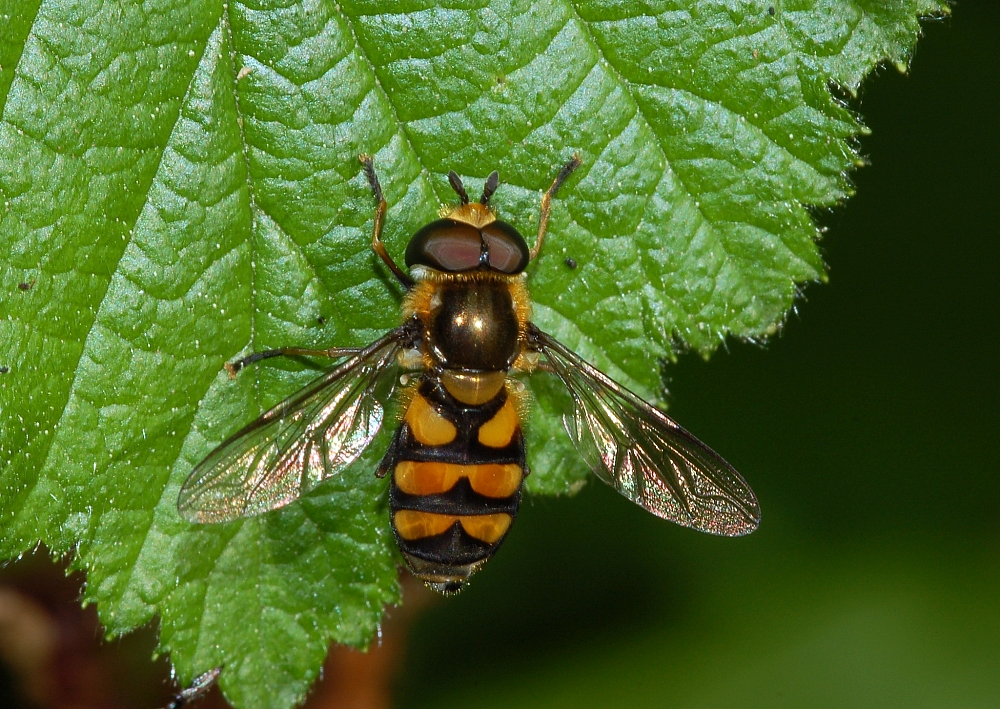
- Didea fasciata male

Scientific classification
- Kingdom: Animalia
- Phylum: Arthropoda
- Class: Insecta
- Order: Diptera
- Family: Syrphidae
- Genus: Didea
- Species: D. fasciata

Binomial name
- Didea fasciata Macquart, 1834

= Didea fasciata =

Species of fly

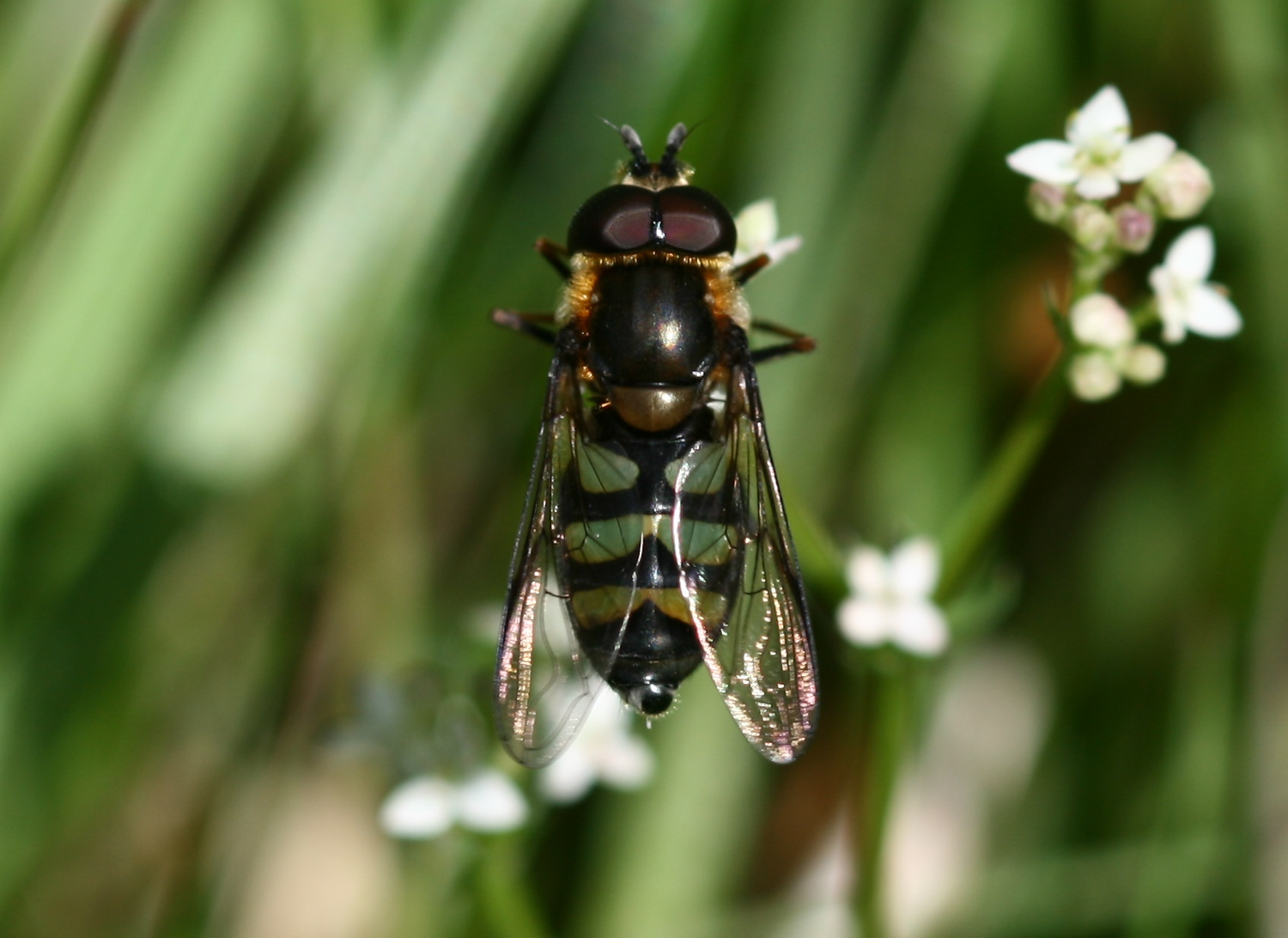
Didea fasciata, male (turquoise variety)

Didea fasciata is a Holarctic species of hoverfly.

== Description ==
External images For terms see Morphology of Diptera
Wing length 8·25– 11 mm. Halteres with yellow knob. Face yellow, at most the tip of the central knob dark. The male genitalia are figured by Vockeroth (1969). The Larva is described and figured by Heiss (1938) .

== Distribution ==
Palaearctic and Nearctic. Fennoscandia South to Spain; Italy and Greece. Ireland eastwards through Russia and the Russian Far East to the Pacific coast. North America from British Columbia South to New Mexico and East to New York. Oriental region to North India and Formosa

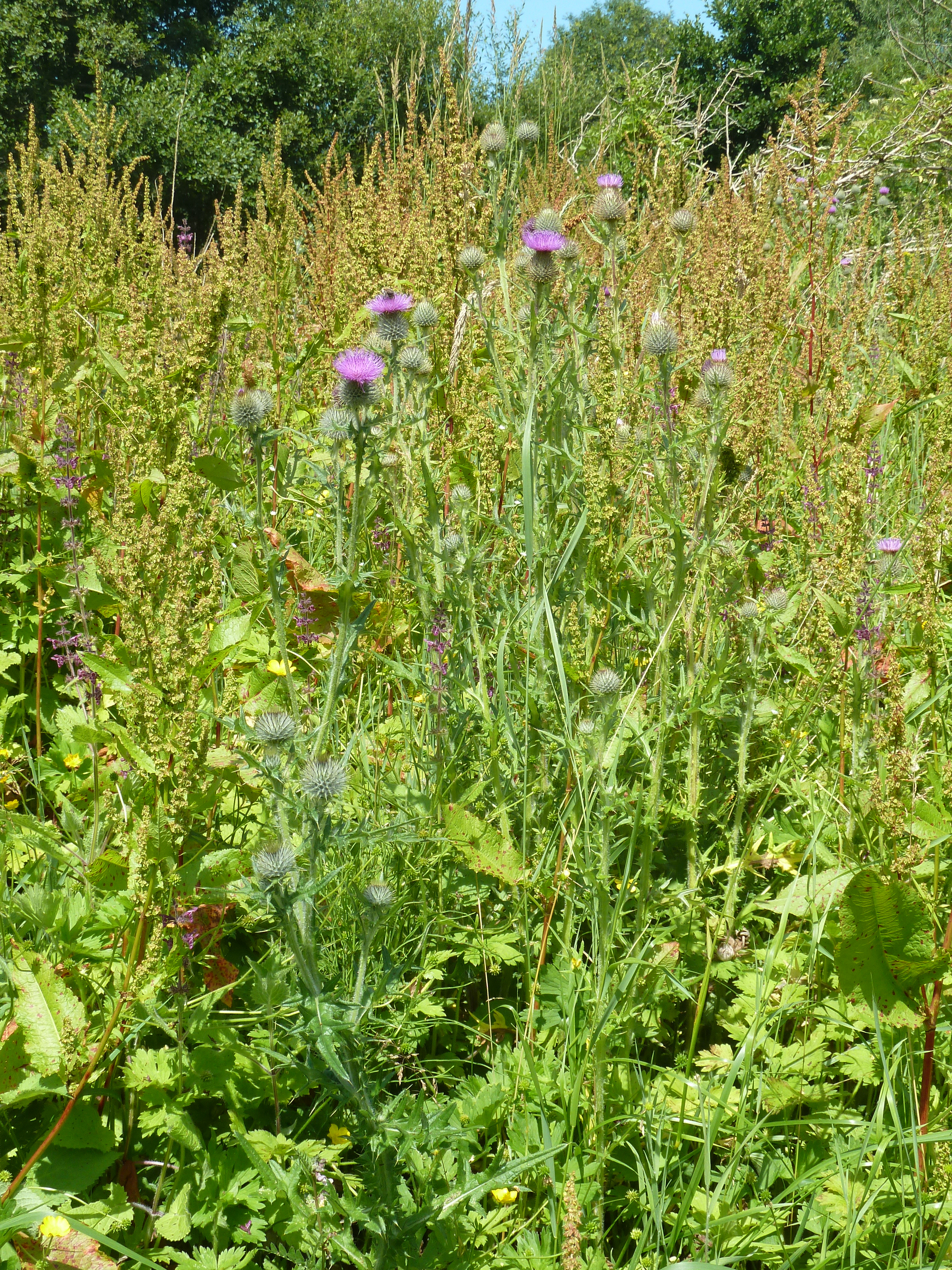
Habitat.Ireland

== Biology ==
Habitat: Deciduous and coniferous forest, tracksides, clearings. Flowers visited include white umbellifers, Arbutus unedo, Chaerophyllum, Crataegus, Galium, Hedera, Hypochoeris, Polygonum cuspidatum, Rubus fruticosus, Rubus idaeus, Sambucus, Urtica dioica, Viburnum opulus. The flight period is May to September. The aphid feeding larvae are arboreal, on both conifers and deciduous trees.
