= List of Toxomerus species =

The following is an incomplete list of hoverfly species within the genus Toxomerus:

- T. aeolus (Hull, 1942)
- T. alphabeticus (Hull,1942)
- T. anthrax
- T. antiopa
- T. apegiensis (Harbach, 1974)
- T. aquilinus (Sack, 1941)
- T. arcifer (Loew, 1866)
- T. aurulentus
- T. basalis
- T. Bidentatus (Giglio-Tos,1893)
- T. bistrigus
- T. boscii (Macquart, 1842)
- T. brevifacies
- T. buscki
- T. calceolatus
- T. centaureus
- T. ciliatus (Giglio-Tos,1892)
- T. circumcinctus
- T.circumdatus (Bigot, 1884)
- T. claracuneus (Hull, 1940)
- T. clarus (Curran 1930)
- T. corbis (Walker, 1852)
- T. costalis (Wiedemann, 1830)
- T. crockeri (Curran, 1934)
- T. croesus (Hull, 1940)
- T. difficilis (Curran, 1930)
- T. dispar (Fabricius, 1794)
- T. duplicatus
- T. ectypus (Say, 1829)
- T. ecuadoreus
- T. elinorae
- T. elisa (Hull, 1951)
- T. eurydice (Hull 1951)
- T.extrapolatus (Hull, 1943)
- T. ferroxida (Hull, 1941)
- T. flaviplurus
- T. flamminea ( Hull 1941)
- T. floralis (Fabricius, 1798)
- T. funestus
- T. geminatus (Say, 1823)
- T. guttifer (Hull, 1943)
- T. hauseri
- T.heraldicus (Bigot, 1884)
- T. hieroglyphicus (Schiner, 1868)
- T. hulli (Sedman)
- T. idalius (Hull, 1951)
- T.imperialis (Curran, 1926)
- T. incaicus (Sack,1941)
- T. insignis (Schiner, 1868)
- T. intermedius (Hull, 1949)
- T. jussiaeae (Vige, 1939)
- T. laciniosus (Loew 1866)
- T. lacrymosus (Bigot, 1884)
- T. laenas (Walker, 1852)
- T. linearis (Wulp 1883)
- T. luna (Hull, 1943)
- T. marginatus (Say, 1823)
- T. minutus
- T. multipunctatus
- T. musicus
- T. mutuus
- T. nasutus
- T. nigripunctus
- T. nitidus
- T. norma
- T. nymphalius
- T. occidentalis (Curran, 1922)
- T. ochraceus
- T. ophiolinea
- T. ornithoglyphus
- T. ovatus
- T. pallipes
- T. papaveroi (Borges & Couri, 2009)
- T. paragrammus
- T. parvulus (Loew, 1866)
- T. pichinchae
- T. pictus (Macquart, 1842)
- T. picudus
- T. politus (Say, 1823)
- T. polygraphicus
- T. porticola
- T. procrasinatus (Metz, 2001)
- T. productus
- T. puellus
- T. pulchellus
- T. purus
- T. quinquecinctus
- T. quinquemaculatus
- T. rohri
- T. rombicus
- T. saphiridiceps
- T. schlingeri
- T. sedmani (Harbach, 1984)
- T. serpentinus
- T. steatogaster (Hull, 1941)
- T. sylvaticus
- T. taenius
- T. teligera (Fluke, 1953)
- T. tibicen (Wiedemann, 1830)
- T. tubularius
- T. una
- T. undecimpunctatus
- T. uranius
- T. valdesi
- T. vertebratus
- T. verticalis (Curran, 1927)
- T. veve
- T. vierecki
- T. violaceus
- T. virgulatus (Macquart, 1850)
- T. watsoni (Curran, 1930)
- T. willistonii
