= Toxomerus basalis =

Scientific classification
- Kingdom: Animalia
- Phylum: Arthropoda
- Class: Insecta
- Order: Diptera
- Family: Syrphidae
- Genus: Toxomerus
- Species: T. basalis

Binomial name
- Toxomerus basalis Walker, 1836

Synonyms
- Mesogramma harlequina Hull, 1951; Mesogramma rhea Hull, 1950; Syrphus basalis Walker, 1836; Syrphus portius Walker, 1852

Species of fly

Toxomerus basalis, commonly known as the sundew flower fly, is a species of kleptoparasitic fly endemic to Brazil. It was first described by Francis Walker in 1836. It feeds on captured, immobilized insects caught on the sticky leaves of sundew plants, which are carnivorous. Adult flies seem to have some capacity to escape from Drosera leaves if they have not come into contact with too many of the tentacles. The species is non-specific and have been found on large-leaved, semi-erect, and thread-like Drosera species, such as Drosera graomogolensis and Drosera magnifica.

== Description ==
Toxomerus basalis was first described in São Paulo and has collected in Rio de Janeiro, Santa Catarina, and Minas Gerais. Adult body length is between 5.5 and 6.5 mm. Larvae, 8–9 mm in length, are usually light green, yellow, or orange, but can also have black, red, and yellow lateral stripes along the length. Due to their coloration, the larvae are well-camouflaged on the Drosera species, particularly those with yellow-green leaves.

== Life cycle ==
Female flies lay individual eggs directly onto the Drosera leaves on the lower, non-sticky surface of leaf buds or juvenile leaves that have newly unfolded. As with other Syrphidae species, the choice of egg-laying sites is critical for the survival of offspring and helps reduce interspecies competition. Larvae have been observed on Drosera leaves during both the wet and dry seasons, although a pattern has not been identified. Larval abundance may vary due to geography, host species, availability of insect prey, and the presence of other Toxomerus species.

Larvae spend their entire development on the sticky leaves of the plant and feed on live insect prey captured by the leaves, including midges, mosquitos, and gnats. Field observations show that the larvae ignore old prey or prey that the host plant had already begun to digest, and feed on relatively recently caught prey that was fully immobilized by the plant, but not dead. The larvae first probe the prey with their mouthparts and only continue touching it if the prey showed some movement. The larvae are able to crawl freely and do not adhere to the Drosera mucilage because their bodies are covered by a thin layer of slime from salivary secretions. Because Drosera tentacles are both thigmonastic (touch-sensitive) and chemotropic (responsive to certain organic chemical), Fleischmann et al. (2016) proposed that the slime both prevented the larvae from sticking to the tentacles and camouflaged them chemically, although the composition of the secretions has not been adequately studied since their original identification. However, 19th century experiments by Darwin showed that water droplets do not cause any tentacle movement in Drosera species; it is possible that the slime is watery enough to make the tentacles insensitive to the larvae's presence.

Despite living as larvae on the top of the Drosera leaves, Toxomerus basalis pupates while attached to the non-sticky underside of the leaves. Prior to pupation, the larvae release their gut contents and the bodies change to a dark brown color. Toxomerus basalis is considered a true kleptoparasite because nutrients are not returned to the plant hosts - when the larvae release their gut contents, they are on the lower side of the leaf, which does not have any digestive glands.

In the pupal stage, lasting three to five days, the pupae are bright green and resemble the pupae of Toxomerus floralis.

Adult Toxomerus basalis feed on both insects captured by Drosera species as well as pollen from Drosera flowers.
