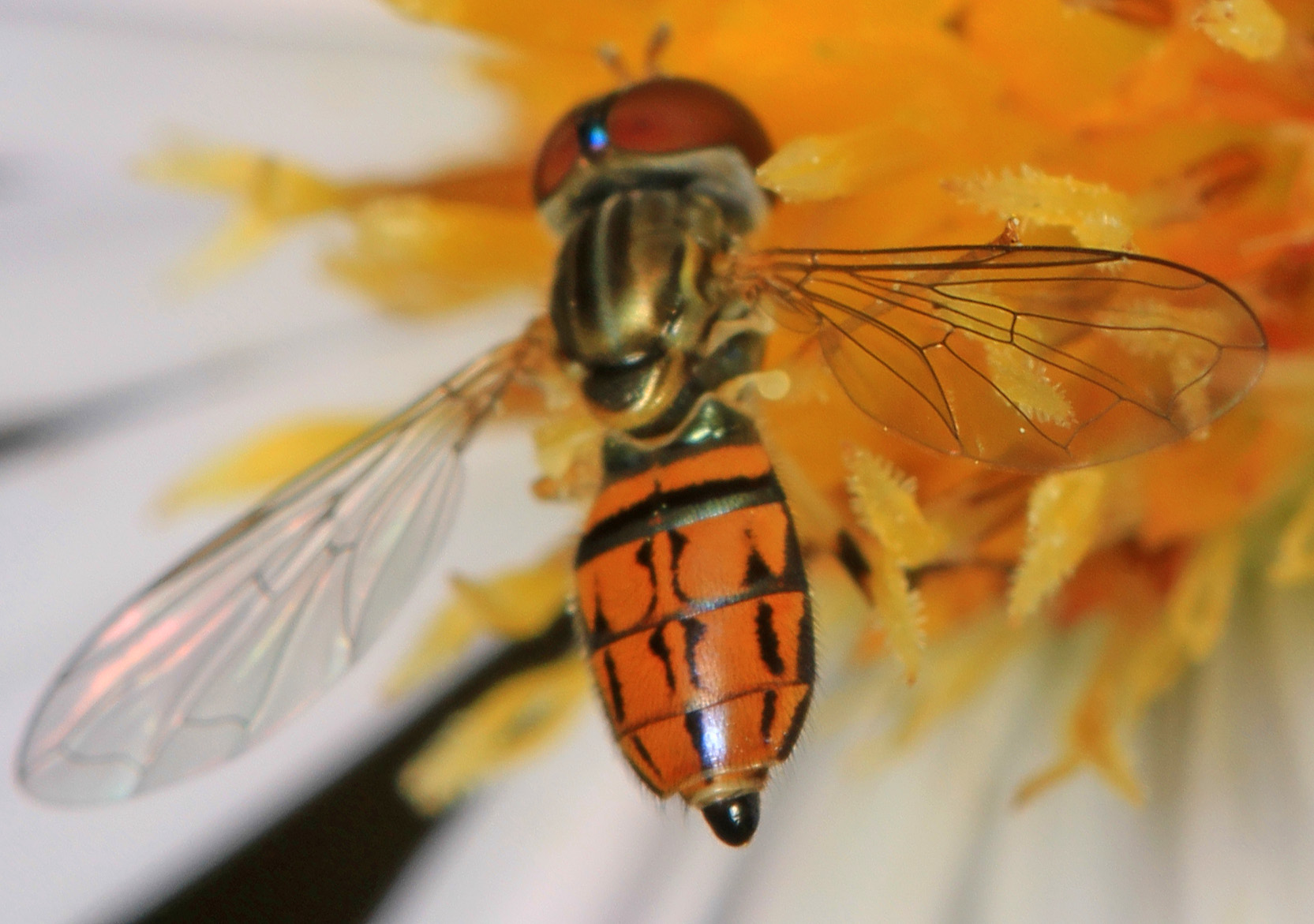

Scientific classification
- Kingdom: Animalia
- Phylum: Arthropoda
- Class: Insecta
- Order: Diptera
- Family: Syrphidae
- Subfamily: Syrphinae
- Tribe: Syrphini
- Genus: Toxomerus
- Species: T. boscii

Binomial name
- Toxomerus boscii Macquart, 1842

Synonyms
- Mesogramma arethusa Hull, 1945; Syrphus gurges Walker, 1852

= Toxomerus boscii =

Species of fly

Toxomerus boscii is a species of syrphid fly in the family Syrphidae.

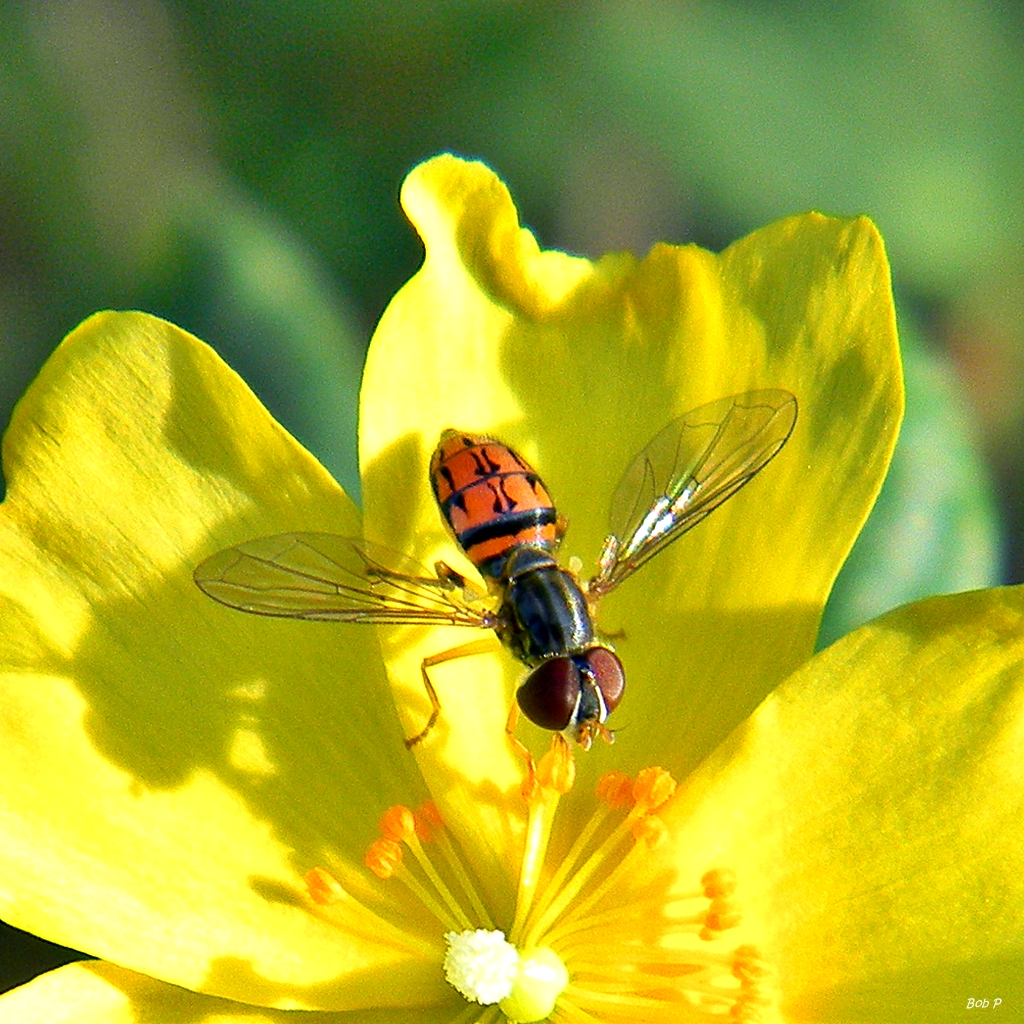

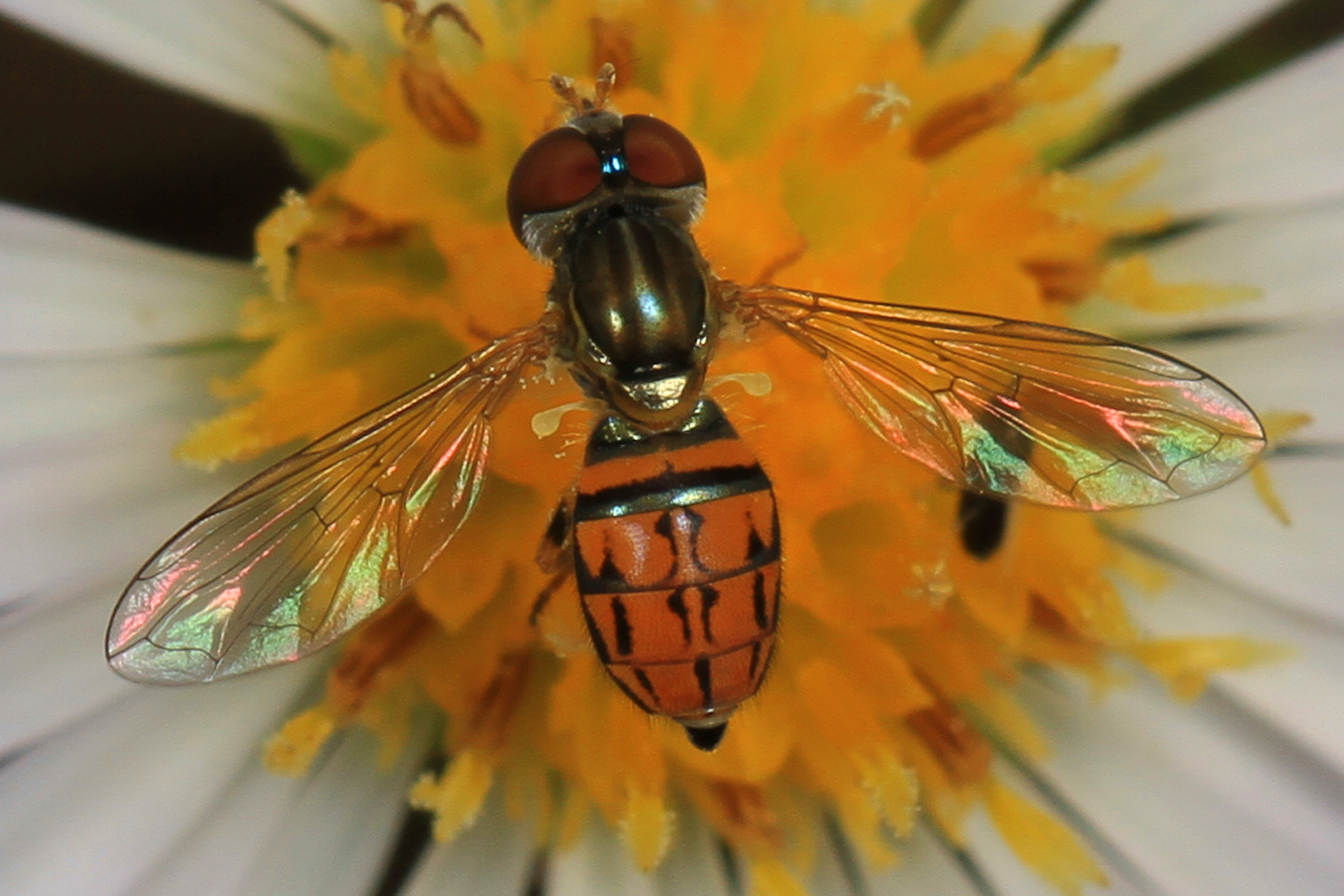
