= Toxomerus verticalis =

Scientific classification
- Kingdom: Animalia
- Phylum: Arthropoda
- Class: Insecta
- Order: Diptera
- Family: Syrphidae
- Genus: Toxomerus
- Species: T. verticalis

Binomial name
- Toxomerus verticalis (Curran, 1927)

Species of fly

Toxomerus verticalis is a species of syrphid fly in the family Syrphidae.
