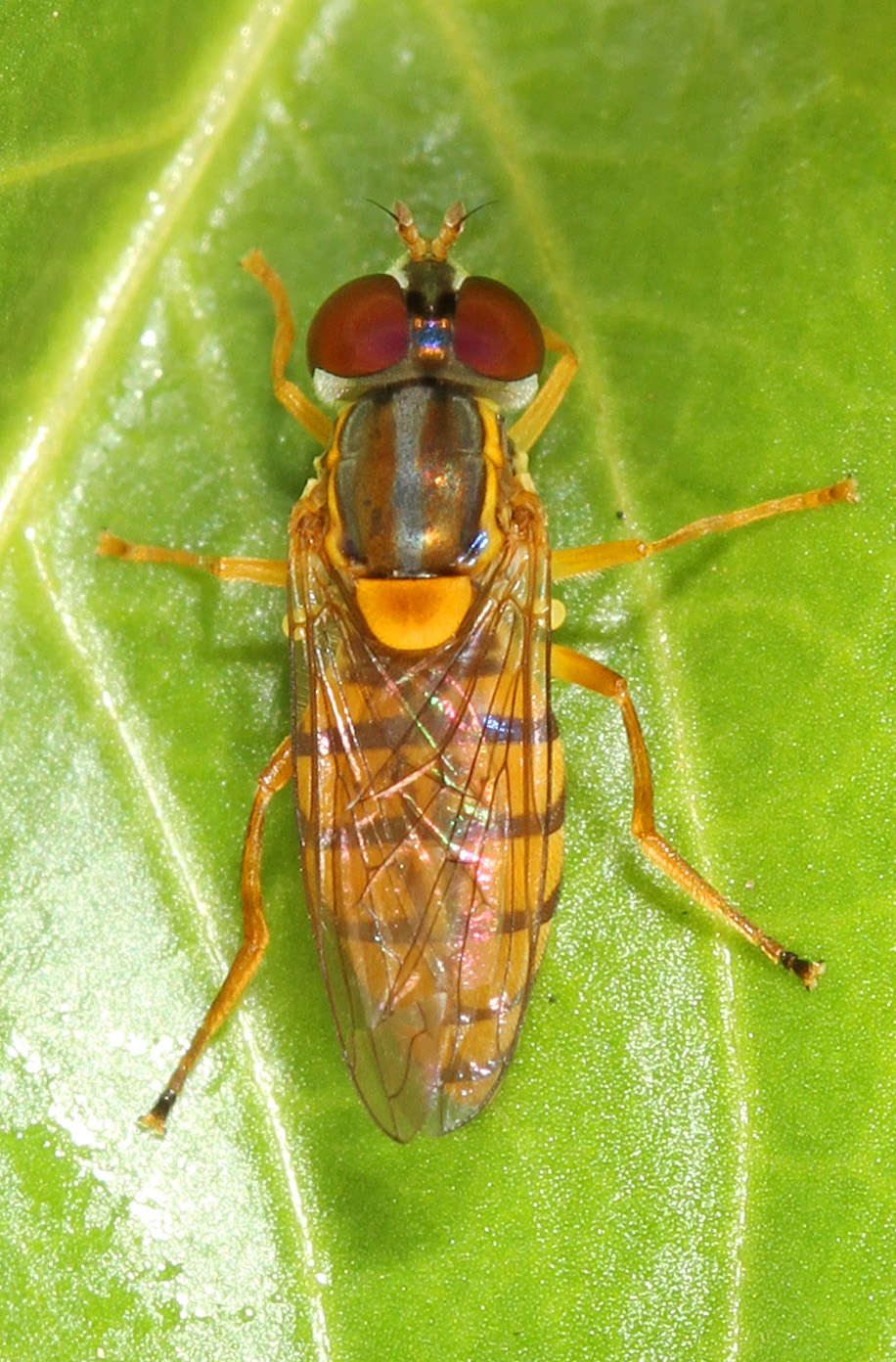

Scientific classification
- Kingdom: Animalia
- Phylum: Arthropoda
- Class: Insecta
- Order: Diptera
- Family: Syrphidae
- Genus: Toxomerus
- Species: T. jussiaeae

Binomial name
- Toxomerus jussiaeae Vige, 1939

= Toxomerus jussiaeae =

Species of fly

Toxomerus jussiaeae is a species in the family Syrphidae ("syrphid flies"), in the order Diptera ("flies").
