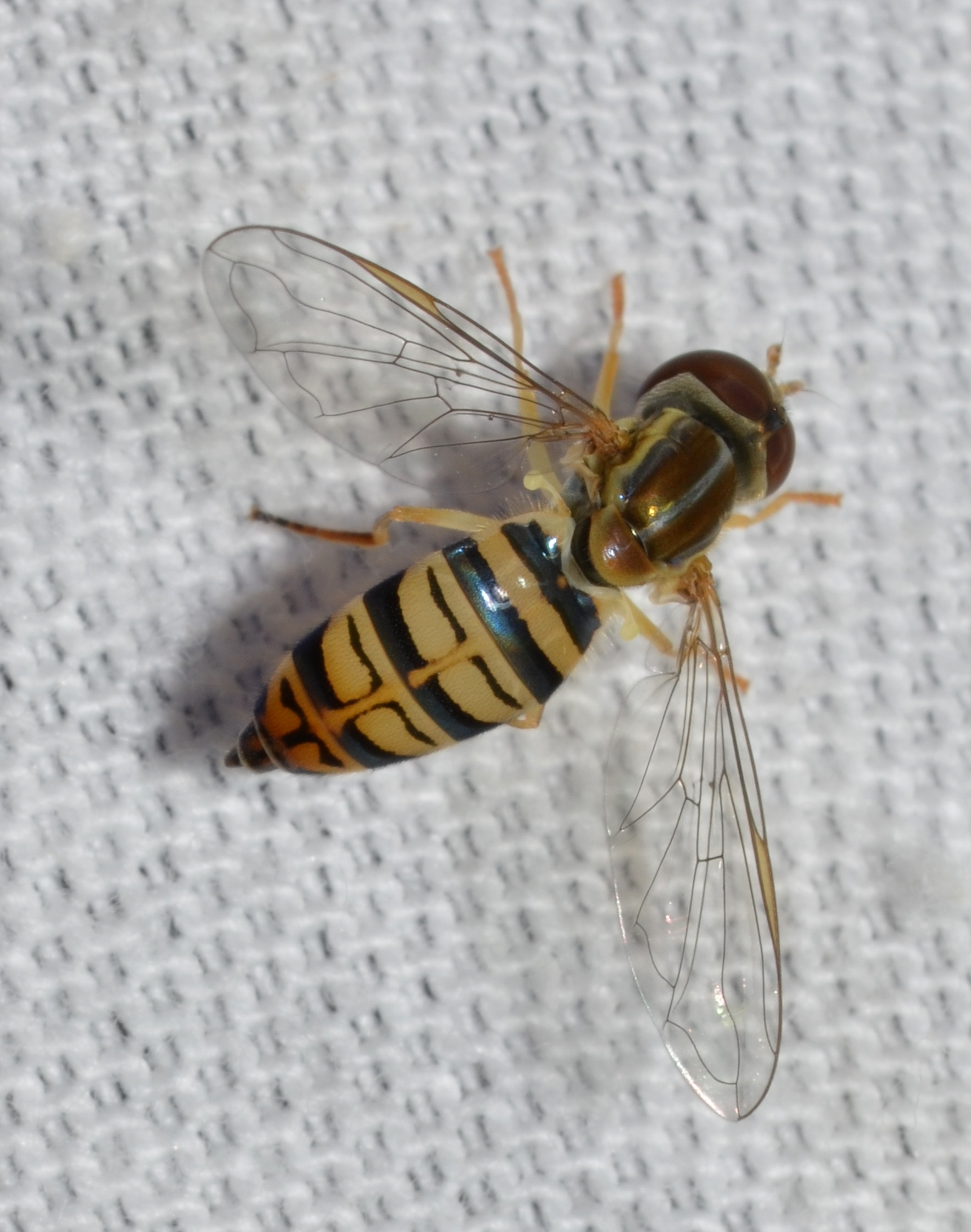
- Adult

Scientific classification
- Kingdom: Animalia
- Phylum: Arthropoda
- Class: Insecta
- Order: Diptera
- Family: Syrphidae
- Genus: Toxomerus
- Species: T. politus

Binomial name
- Toxomerus politus (Say, 1823)
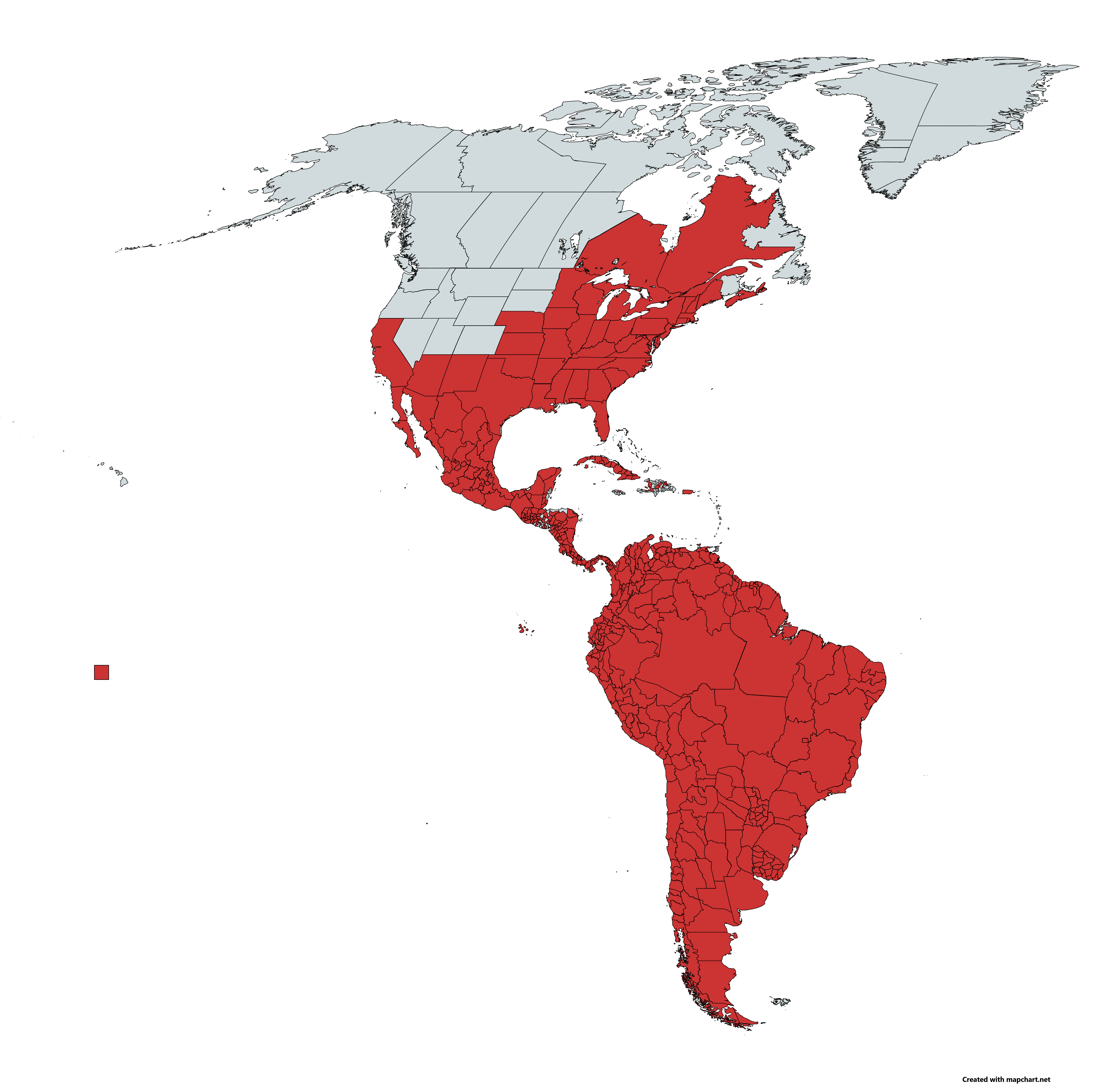
- T. politus distribution 2023

Synonyms
- List: Scaeva polita Say, 1823; Syrphus politus Say, 1824; Mesogramma polita Osten Sacken, 1878; Meosgramma politum Williston, 1891; Toxomerus politus Kertesz, 1910; Syrphus anchoratus Macquart, 1842; Syrphus cingulatulus Macquart, 1850; Syrphus hecticus Jaennicke, 1867 .

= Toxomerus politus =

Species of fly

Toxomerus politus, commonly known as the maize calligrapher, is a species of hoverfly (Diptera: Syrphidae). It is known from North, Central and South America. (see map) Although little is known about the early stages of this species, associations with corn have been noted. The adults and likely the larvae feed on the pollen of the corn plants.

== Description ==
For terminology, see Speight key to genera and glossary

Size

8–9 mm (0.31–0.35 in)

=== Head ===
The frontal triangle is yellow, while the vertical triangle is black, pollinose in front of the ocelli, with black pile. The front in female is black, rather thickly yellowish-whitish pollinose, with narrowly yellow on the sides below the ocelli. The face is yellow, with white pollen, white pile laterally, and bare and shiny medially. The gena is also yellow. The frontal lunule is yellow, with a reddish-brown spot medially. In the female, the face is brown medially, and the frontal lunule is completely yellow. The antenna has a yellow scape and pedicel. The flagellum orange, with yellow pile. In the female the scape and pedicel have black pile and the flagellum is brown. The eye has a distinct triangular emargination on posterior margin ( typical for the genus) at or above the level of the antenna. The eyes are narrowly holoptic anteriorly in the male. The occiput is black except narrowly yellow ventrally, silver pollinose, white pilose except dorsal 1/4 black pilose anteriorly;

=== Thorax ===
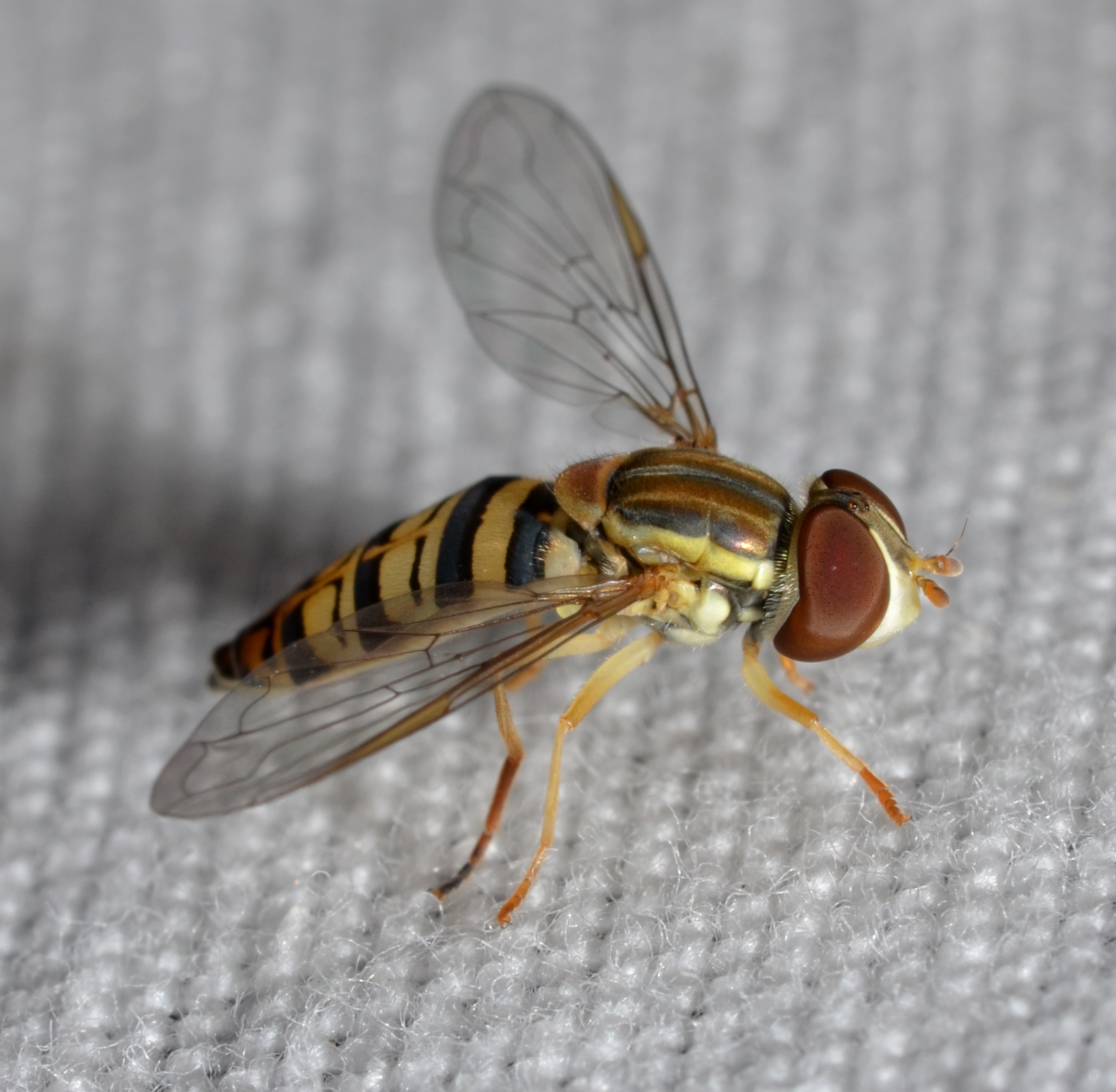
lateral view

The thorax is black with yellow markings. The scutum is greenish-bronze, pollinose, and has a narrow, shiny vitta and sublateral shiny vittae running along its length. There is a distinct median ashy grey stripe on the scutum, which is bordered by yellow, green, and brownish or olivaceous stripes. The scutellum is brown with a yellow margin, black pile, and a white subscutellar fringe. The pleurae have a metallic, shining appearance, and there are three yellow spots; one on the meso, one on the sterno-pleurae, and one above the front coxae, which is smaller than the other two. There is a silver-gray, pollinose finish on several areas. Ventrally and laterally, the pleurae are covered in white hairs, except for the posterior anepisternum which is yellow-haired, and dorsally they are covered in yellow hairs.

==== Wings ====
Wings nearly clear, extensively microtrichose with the stigma dilutely yellow. The calypter is yellow except brown on dorsal margin.The halter is yellow.

==== Legs ====
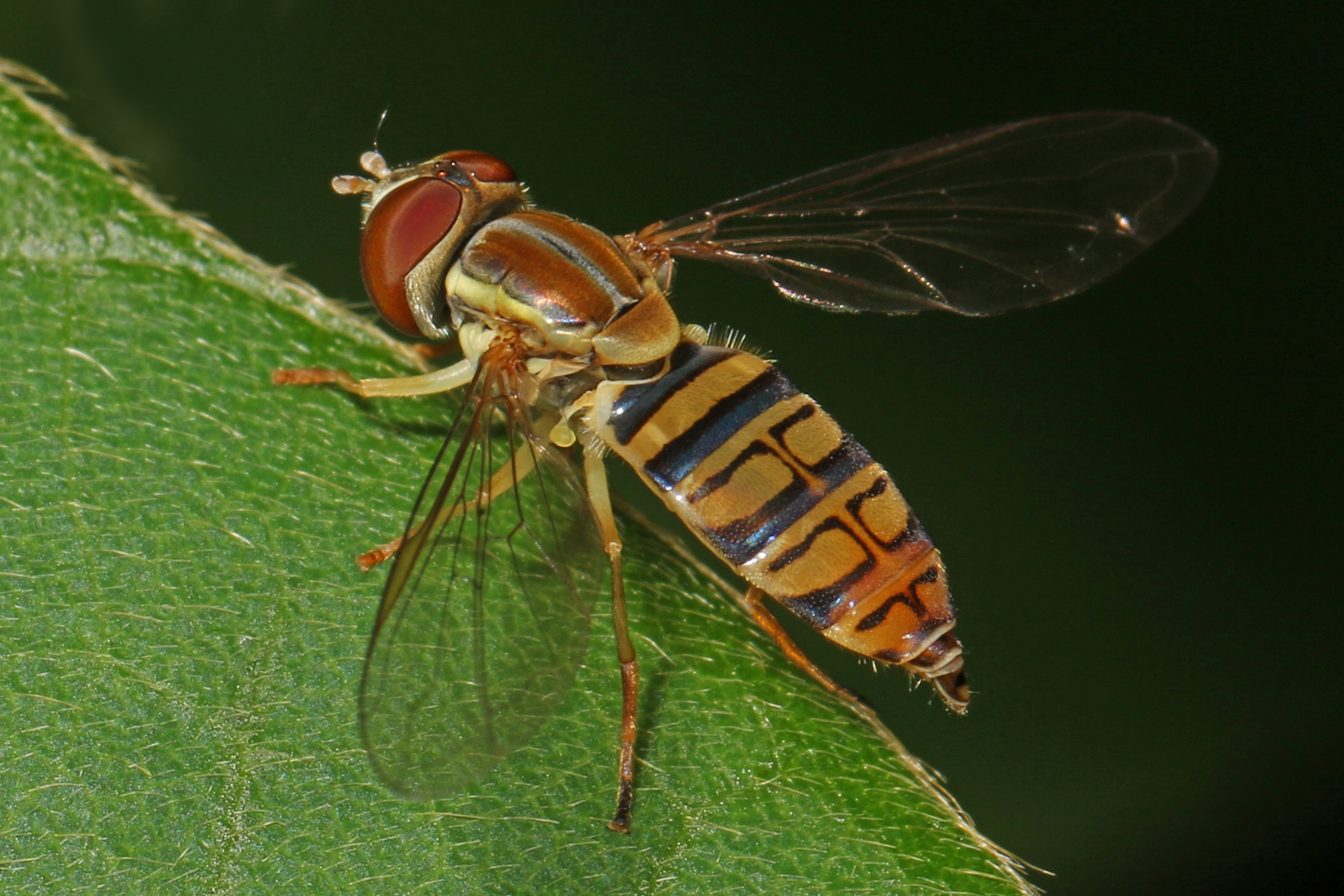
lateral view

The front and middle coxae are mostly black, though some have a yellow appicly. The hind coxae are yellow and covered in yellow pile. The femora are mostly yellow with yellow pile, and the upper third of the middle and hind femora are black pilose. The tibiae are yellow and covered in yellow pile, except for the pile on the middle tibia which is black. The tarsi are yellow, except for the distal hind tarsi which are black dorsally and yellow pilose, except for the distal hind tarsi which are black pilose dorsally. In the female, all the metatarsi are brown-black dorsally and black pilose dorsally.

=== Abdomen ===
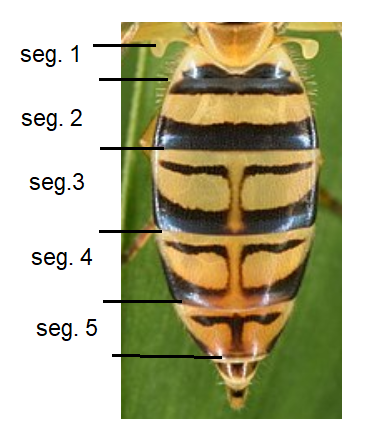
abdominal segments

The abdomen is mostly black, with a yellow base and sides on the first segment. The second segment has a broad, entire yellow cross-band on the median. The female's third and fourth segments have a narrow yellow border at the front and a thin line passing through narrow interruptions of the broad yellow cross-bands. The fifth segment is yellow, except for two rectangular, parallel, and more or less connected black spots. The male's third and fourth segments are yellow or yellowish red, except for a pair of black lines on each side, resembling the sides of a square and being more or less indistinct. The fifth segment and the hypopygium are entirely yellow.
