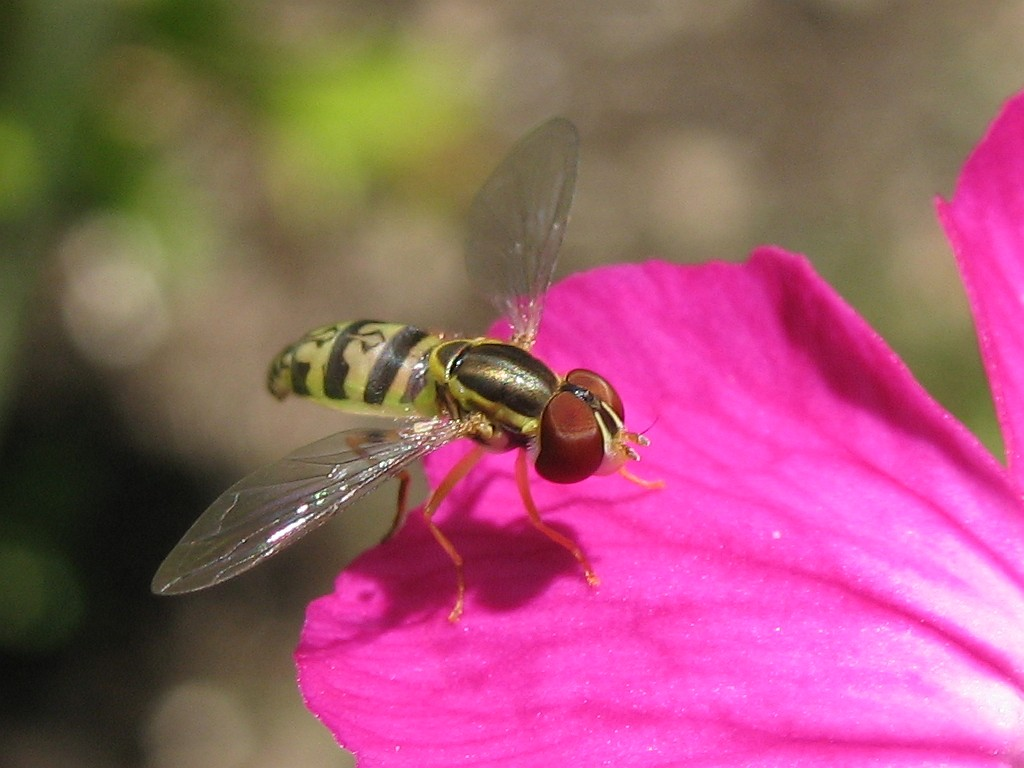
- Toxomerus geminatus male

Scientific classification
- Kingdom: Animalia
- Phylum: Arthropoda
- Clade: Pancrustacea
- Class: Insecta
- Order: Diptera
- Family: Syrphidae
- Genus: Toxomerus
- Species: T. geminatus

Binomial name
- Toxomerus geminatus (Say, 1823)
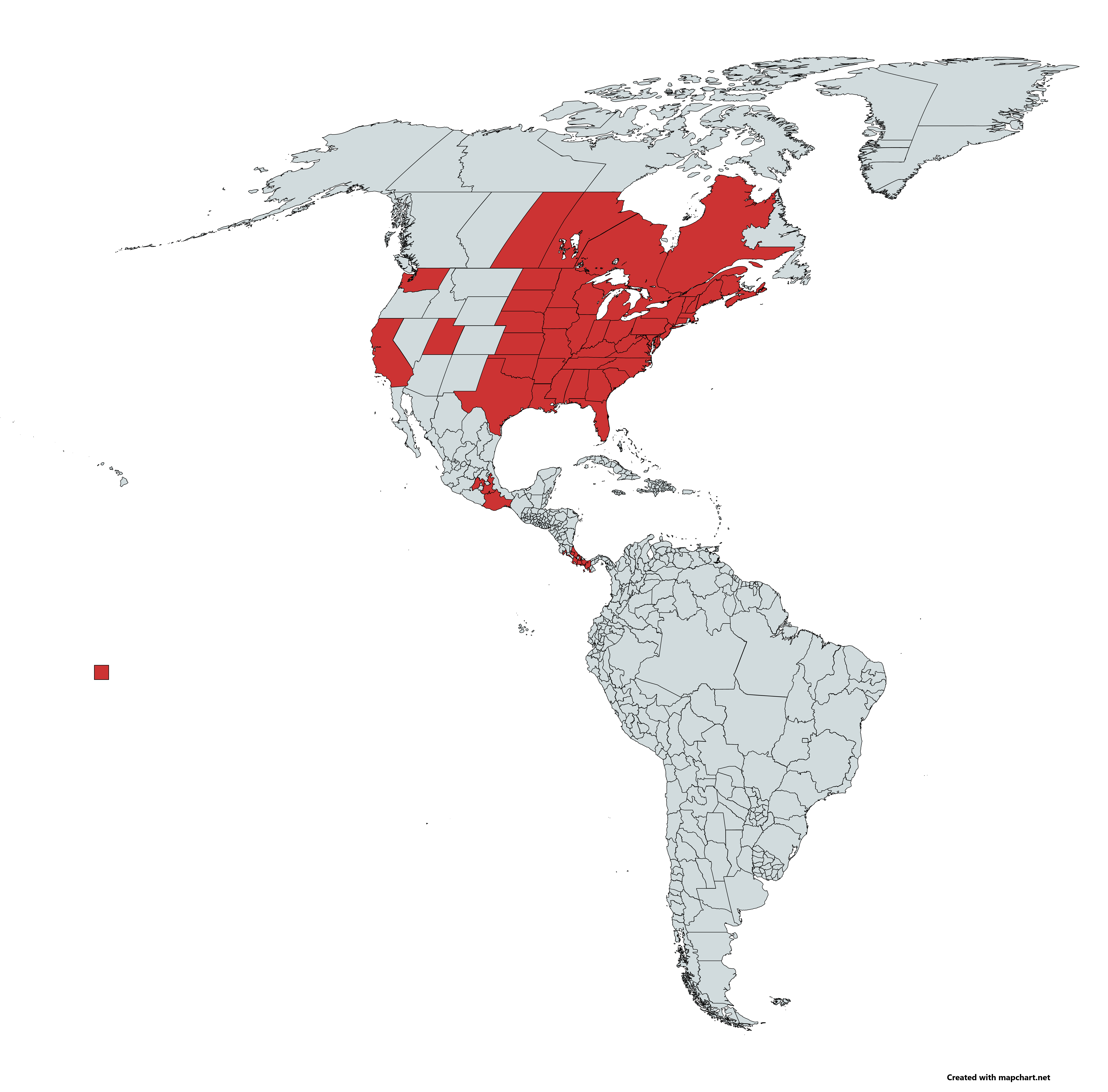
- T.geminatus range 2023

Synonyms
- Scaeva geminata Say, 1823; Eumerus privernus Walker, 1852; Syrphus interrogans Walker, 1852; Toxomerus notatus Macquart, 1855

= Toxomerus geminatus =

Species of fly

Toxomerus geminatus (Say,1823) the Eastern Calligrapher, is a common species of syrphid fly observed in the eastern and central United States and Canada. Syrphid flies are also known as Hover Flies or Flower Flies because the adults are frequently found hovering around flowers from which they feed on nectar and pollen. Adults are 6.1–7.6 mm (0.24–0.30 in) long and are very similar to the Western Calligrapher. The larvae are predators of a variety of aphids and mites.

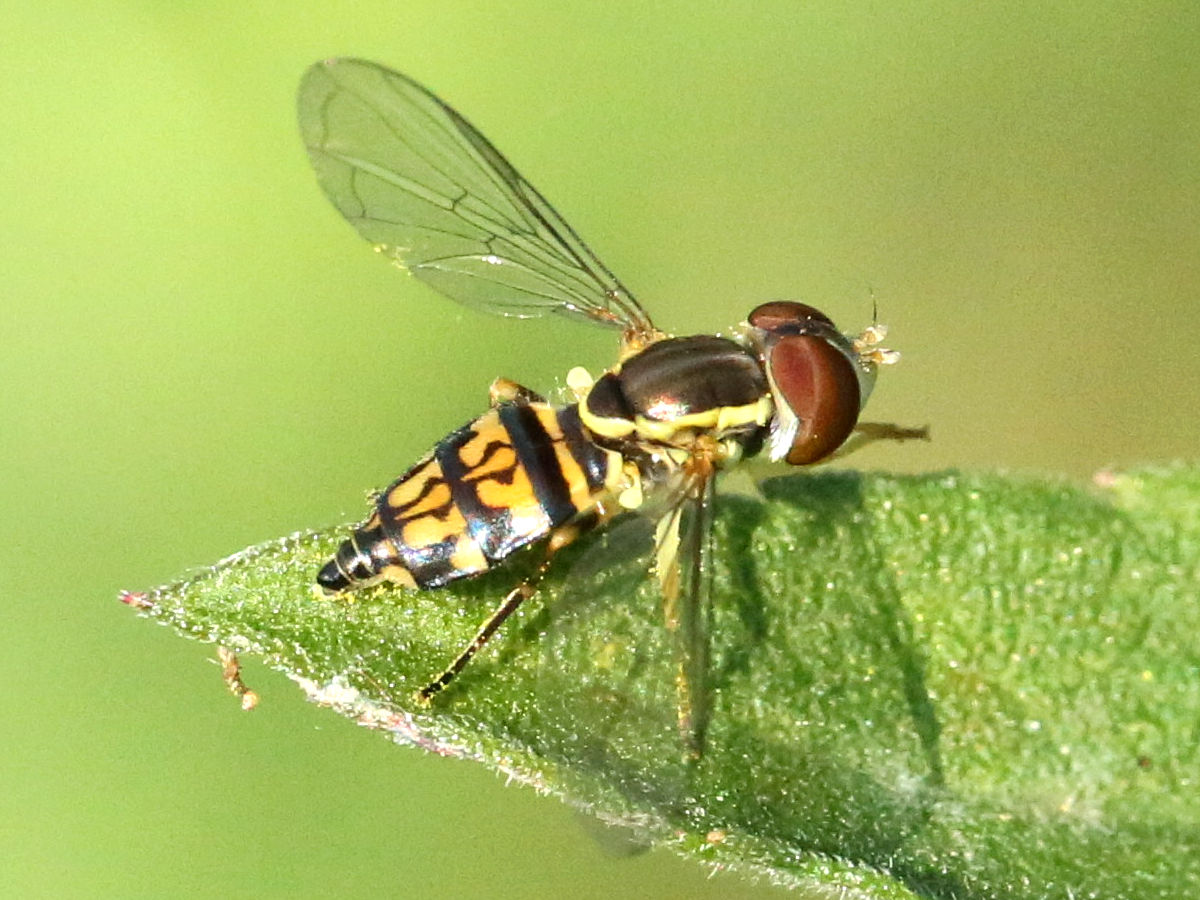
Female

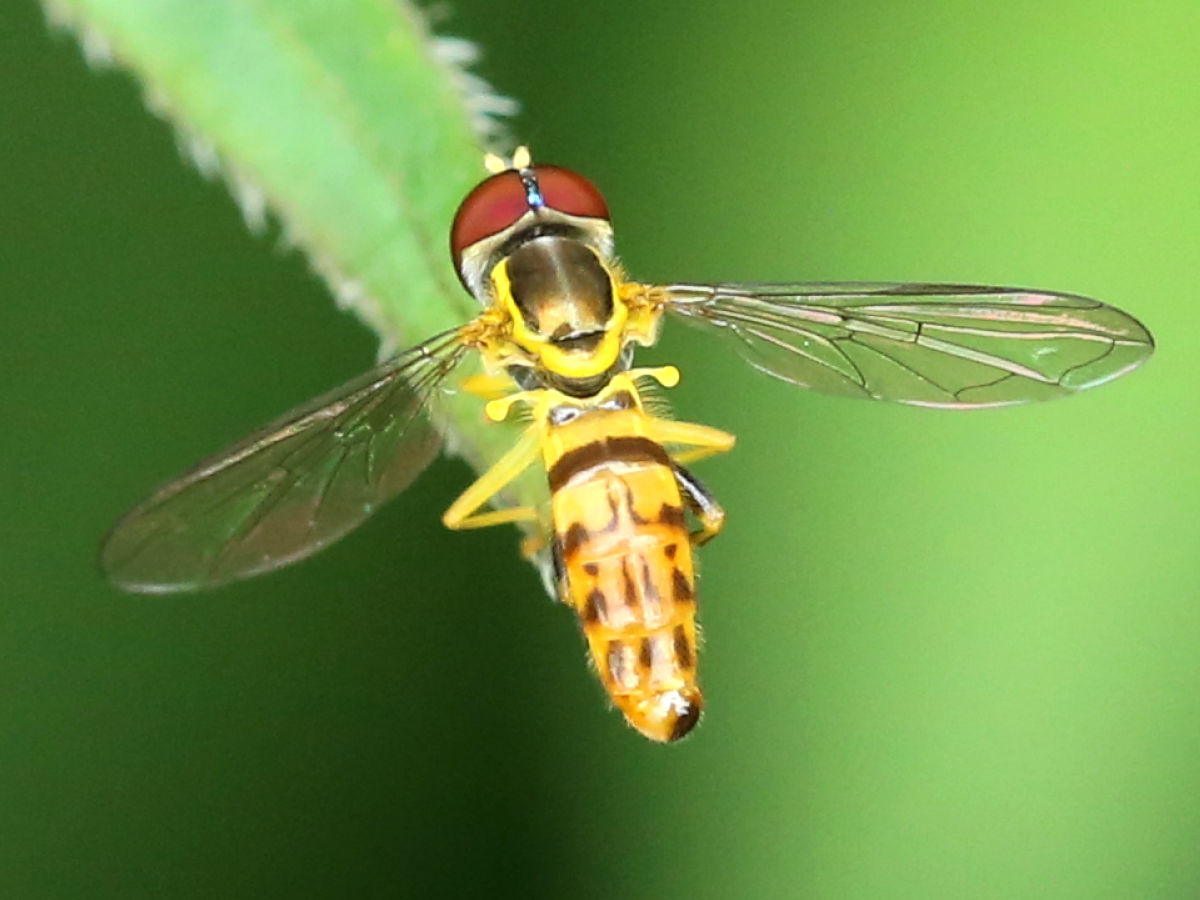
Male

== Description ==
For terminology see Speight key to genera and glossary

Size
Length, . 5–7.6 mm (0.20–0.30 in)

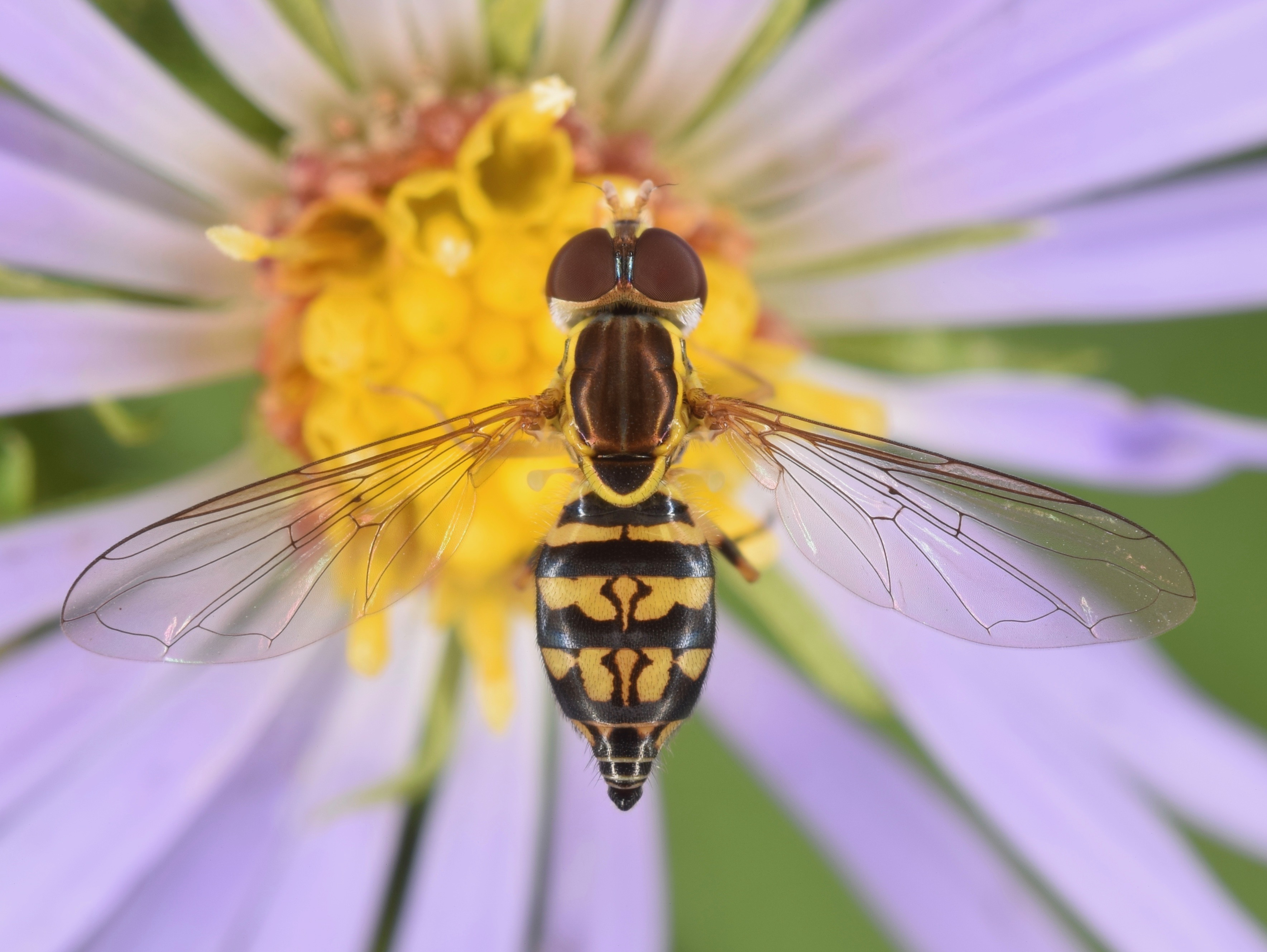
T. geminatus dorsal

Head

The face, frontal triangle, and antennae are light yellow in color, and the face has white pollen on the sides. The antennae may sometimes be a little brownish. In the female, the front is much narrower above, and is shining black, with a narrow yellow line on the sides at the lower half. The posterior orbits are thickly whitish dusted, and the eye has a distinct triangular emargination on the posterior margin at or above the level of the antennae.

Thorax

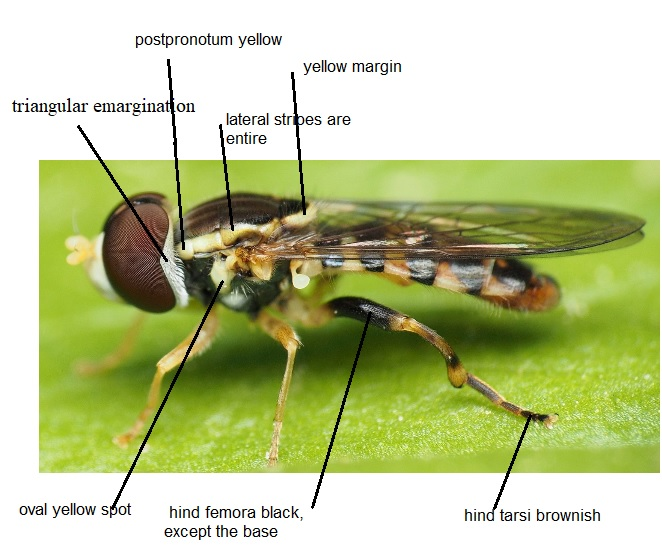
anatomy

The scutum is shining black, with opaque linear stripes and the lateral stripes being entirely yellow and the median stripe being cinereous (ashy gray) but only moderately distinct, and with a faint gray submedian stripe. The disc of the scutum is slightly brownish and pruinose. The scutellum has a black disc and a yellow margin which is broadly yellow. The pleurae are shining greenish black, and there is an oval yellow spot on the meso-pleurae, as well as a smaller and more whitish one below it, narrowly separated. The propleuron and anepimeron are entirely black, and the hairs on the anterior anepisternum of the female are extremely short and scarcely discernible.

Wings

The wings are nearly hyaline with mostly black veins.

Legs

The legs are mostly yellow, while the hind femora are black, except at the base, which is less extensive in the female, often only appearing as a brown ring. The hind tibiae are indistinctly biannulate with brown, and the hind tarsi are brownish. The front and middle coxae are mostly or entirely black, while the hind coxae are yellow. The hind tarsae are also brown.

Abdomen

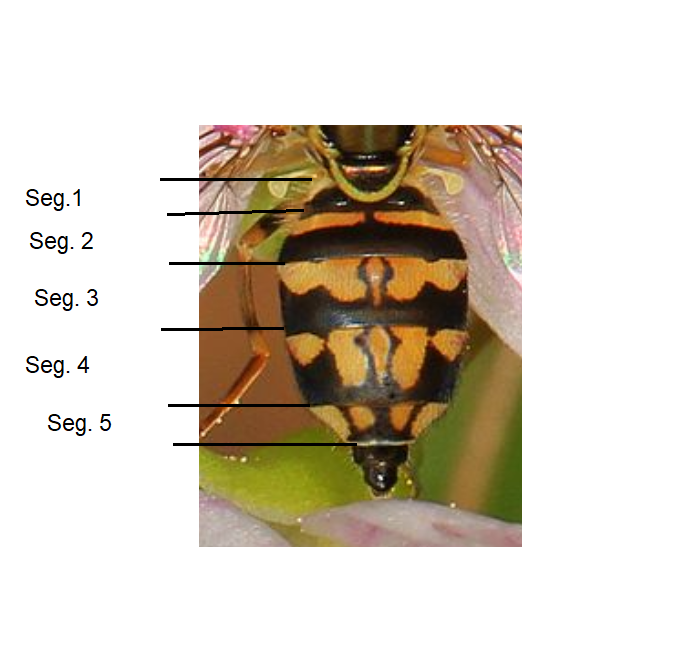
abdomen diagram

The abdomen of the female is broadly flattened and oval, and is broadest at the tip of the third segment. It is usually shining black with yellow markings as follows: a black band at the base of the first segment and a narrow median crossband, which is attenuated in the middle and interrupted, on the second segment. The third and fourth segments have a slender median stripe that is wider toward the front and a pair of large spots on the anterior margin that are dilated behind on the ends. The fourth segment is rather deeply marginate on each side behind and the ends are rounded and extend backward. The fifth segment has yellow anterior angles and sometimes two projections from the anterior margin near the middle. The hypopygium is reddish yellow, with the upper half shining black. In some specimens, the yellow cross-band of the second segment may be confined to a small spot on each side or be wholly absent, the median stripe of the third and fourth segments may be wholly absent, and there may only be four small anterior spots on the fourth segment. The spots on the anterior angles of the fifth segment may be very small, and the hypopygium may be almost wholly black. The front and middle are also usually black.
