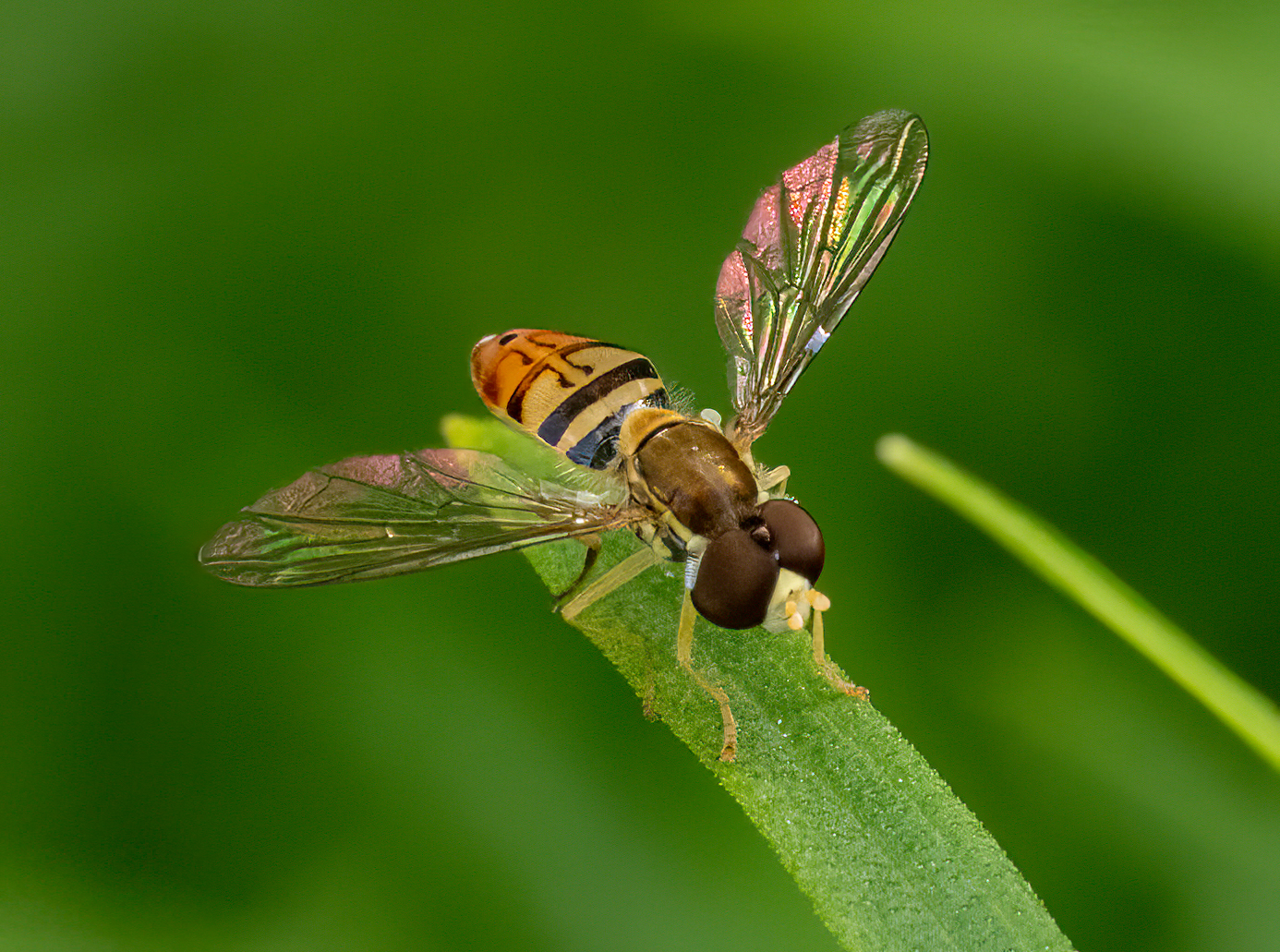
- Toxomerus marginatus male
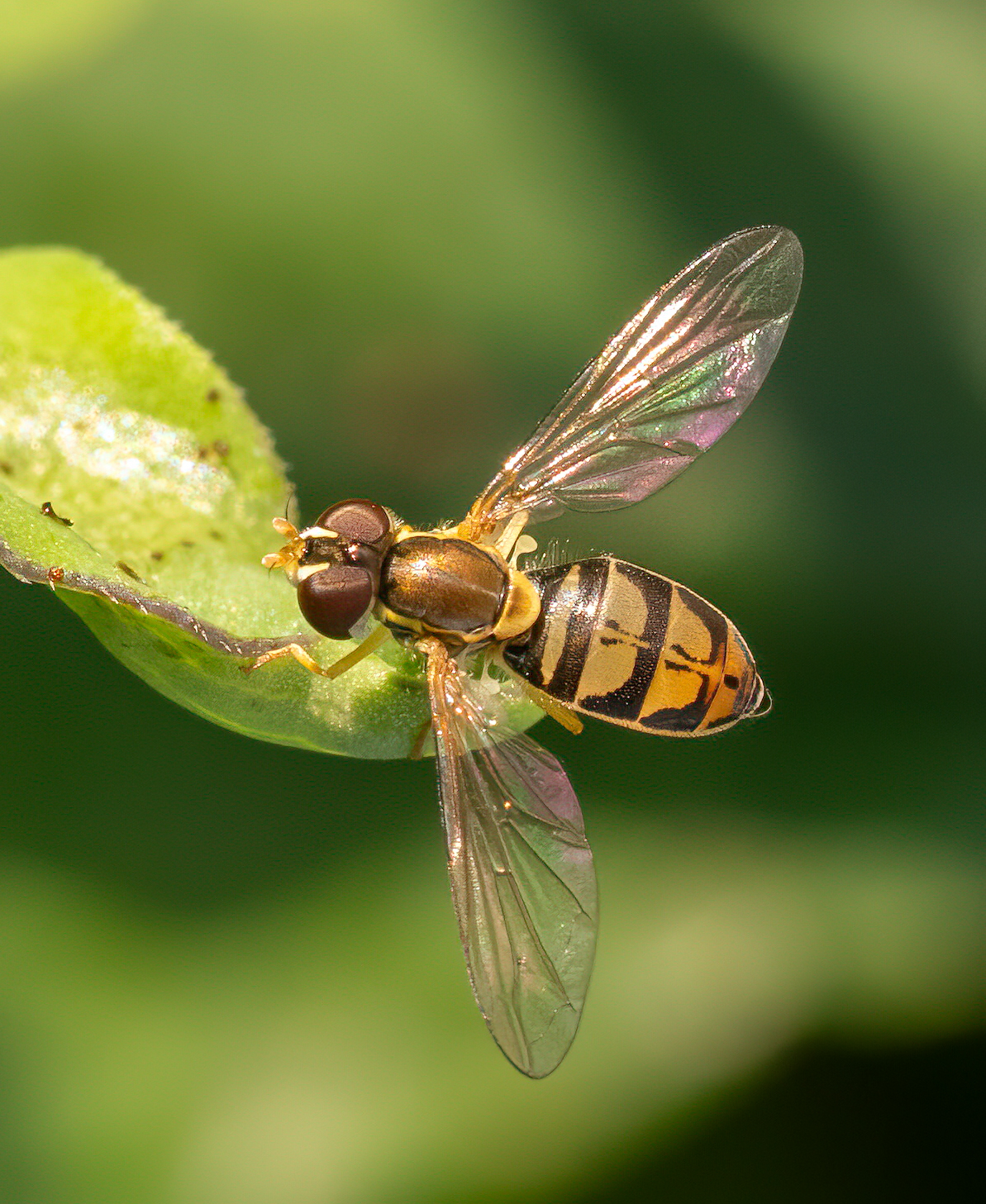
- Toxomerus marginatus female

Scientific classification
- Kingdom: Animalia
- Phylum: Arthropoda
- Class: Insecta
- Order: Diptera
- Family: Syrphidae
- Genus: Toxomerus
- Species: T. marginatus

Binomial name
- Toxomerus marginatus (Say, 1823)

Synonyms
- Scaeva marginata Say, 1823; Syrphus limbiventris Thomson, 1869

= Toxomerus marginatus =

Species of insect

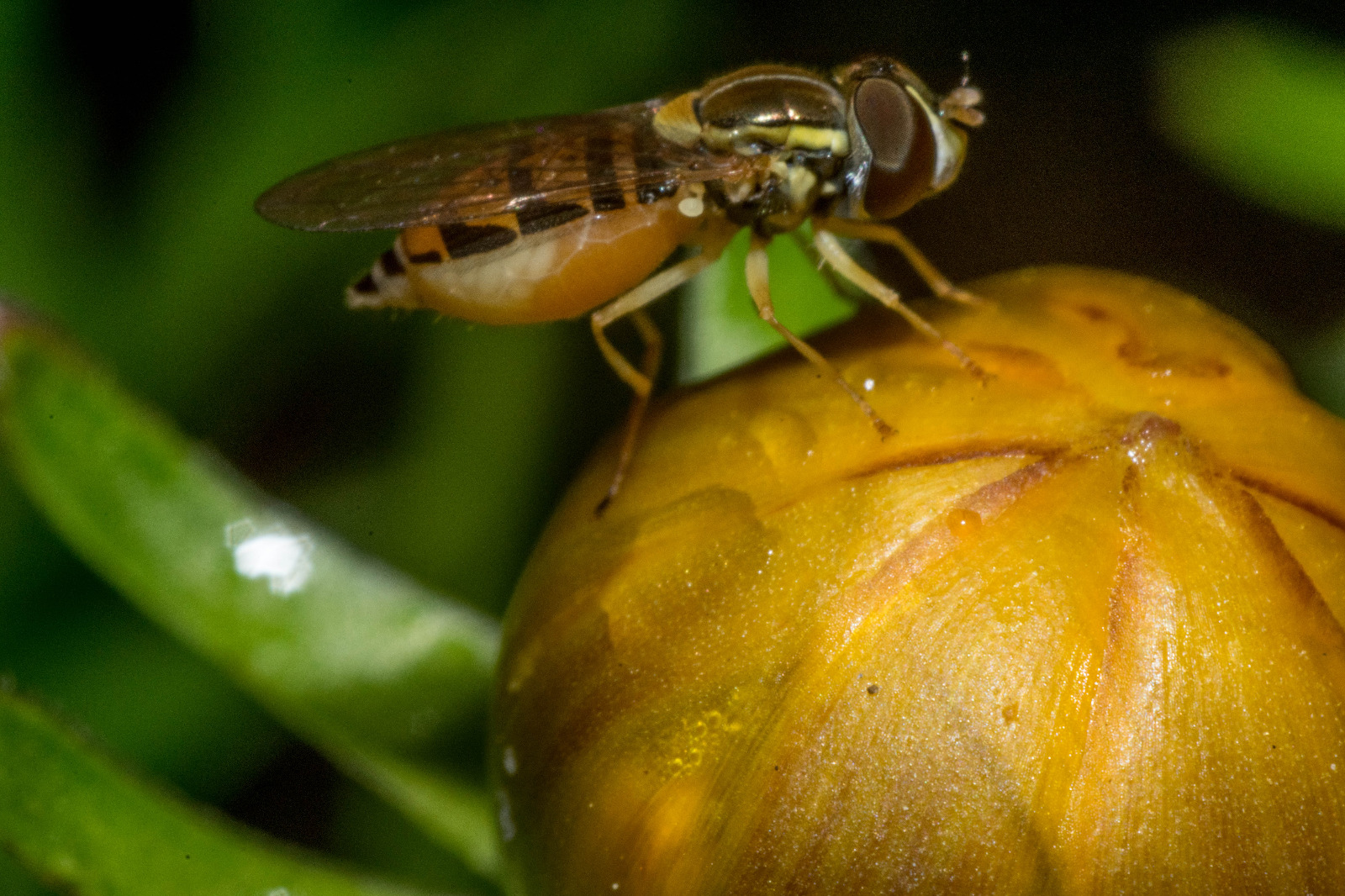
Hoverfly resting on a flowerbud

Female margined calligrapher fly consuming pollen from zinnia florets.

Toxomerus marginatus, also known as the margined calligrapher fly, is a common species of hoverfly. It is found in many parts of North America.

The larvae are predators of thrips, aphids, and small caterpillars. Adults feed on a wide range of flowers. Smith & Chaney 2007 finds T. marginatus is the most numerous of the Syrphidae species controlling aphids in lettuce fields on California's Central Coast.Toxomerus marginatus are commonly found in cranberry fields. This species of syrphid is highly attracted to the plant volatile methyl salicylate, which is a floral compound as well as being an herbivore-induced plant volatile.

== Description ==
=== Size ===
5–6 mm (0.20–0.24 in)

=== Head ===
The face is whitish yellow and thinly pollinose. It is expanded forward and downwards, with a yellow facial tubercle that is yellow pilose. The gena is black and yellow pilose. The frontal triangle is yellow, and the vertical triangle is black, both with black pilose. The antennae are reddish yellow and a little brownish gray above, with a black arista. The eye has a distinct triangular emargination on the posterior margin at or above the level of the antenna, is bare. The occiput is black and silvery-golden pollinose, with white-yellow pilose.

=== Thorax ===
The scutum is olive black, but not very glossy, with a distinct ashy grey median stripe bordered narrowly by brownish coloration on either side. The lateral margin has a yellow stripe running from the postpronotum to the scutellum, and is bronze pollinose with a white pollinose dorsomedial stripe and yellow pile. The postpronotum is yellow and bare. The scutellum is yellow with a dorsomedial brown spot, black pilose, and a sparse subscutellar fringe with yellow pile. The pleurae are shining greenish black and have yellow spots on the meso and sternopleurae, as well as a third, minute yellow spot located above the front coxae. The pleuron is mostly black, except for the proepimeron which is yellow, the posterior anepisternum which is yellow on the posterior half, and the katepisternum which is black with a dorsal yellow macula. Lastly, the metasternum is bare.

=== Wings ===
The wings of the insect are nearly hyaline, with the calypter being yellow and the halter being yellow. The wing membrane stigma is dark yellow and mostly microtrichose.

=== Legs ===
The legs are entirely yellow, except for the procoxa which is black, and the middle and hind tarsi which are brown with black and yellow pile.

=== Abdomen ===
The abdomen is black and shining, and is narrowly margined with yellow. The first segment is black with a yellow base. The second segment is black, with yellow lateral margins and a broad yellow medial fascia. The first and second segments are yellow pilose, The third and fourth segments each have a median line and a large, somewhat oblique spot on each side that reaches the base of the segment.They have lateral and submedial black vittae connected posteriorly by a black fascia, which is sometimes interrupted in the medial point of the tergum, and submedial maculate vittae. The fifth segment has two oblique spots which are confluent at the tip, and is parallel-sided.
