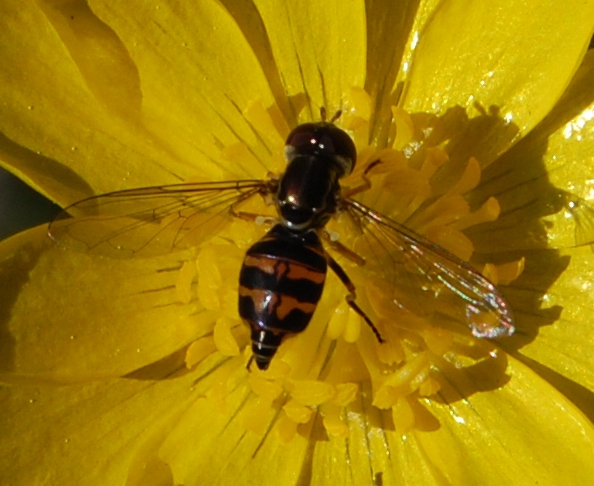
- Toxomerus occidentalis female

Scientific classification
- Kingdom: Animalia
- Phylum: Arthropoda
- Class: Insecta
- Order: Diptera
- Family: Syrphidae
- Genus: Toxomerus
- Species: T. occidentalis

Binomial name
- Toxomerus occidentalis Curran, 1922

= Toxomerus occidentalis =

Species of fly

Toxomerus occidentalis (Curran,1922) the Western Calligrapher, is a common species of syrphid fly found in western North America from British Columbia south to California, Colorado and Texas. Syrphid flies are also known as Hover Flies or Flower Flies because the adults are frequently found hovering around flowers from which they feed on nectar and pollen. Adults look very similar to the Eastern Calligrapher.The larvae are predators of a variety of aphids and mites.

Female Western Calligrapher on zinnia taking pollen and nectar. Insert shows entire visit at 3X speed. Some portions of main video shown at one-tenth speed.
