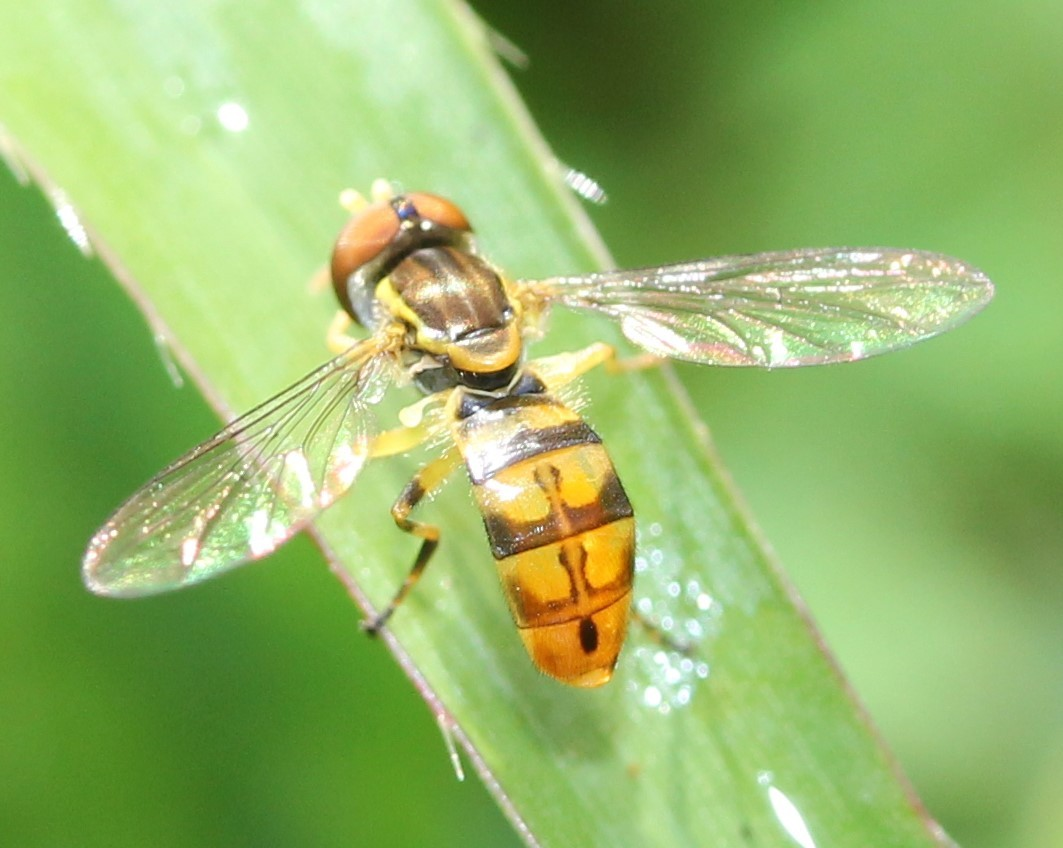

Scientific classification
- Kingdom: Animalia
- Phylum: Arthropoda
- Class: Insecta
- Order: Diptera
- Family: Syrphidae
- Genus: Toxomerus
- Species: T. floralis

Binomial name
- Toxomerus floralis (Fabricius, 1798)

Synonyms
- Mesogramma subannulata Loew, 1866; Syrphus floralis Fabricius, 1798

= Toxomerus floralis =

Species of fly

Toxomerus floralis is a species of syrphid fly in the family Syrphidae. Its native range is from the southern US through South America. The fly has been introduced into Africa, where Cyperus rotundus is a host plant for oviposition through pupation. Mitracarpus hirtus is another known host plant for the species, making T. floralis the only species of Toxomerus with larvae known to feed on plants from different families.
