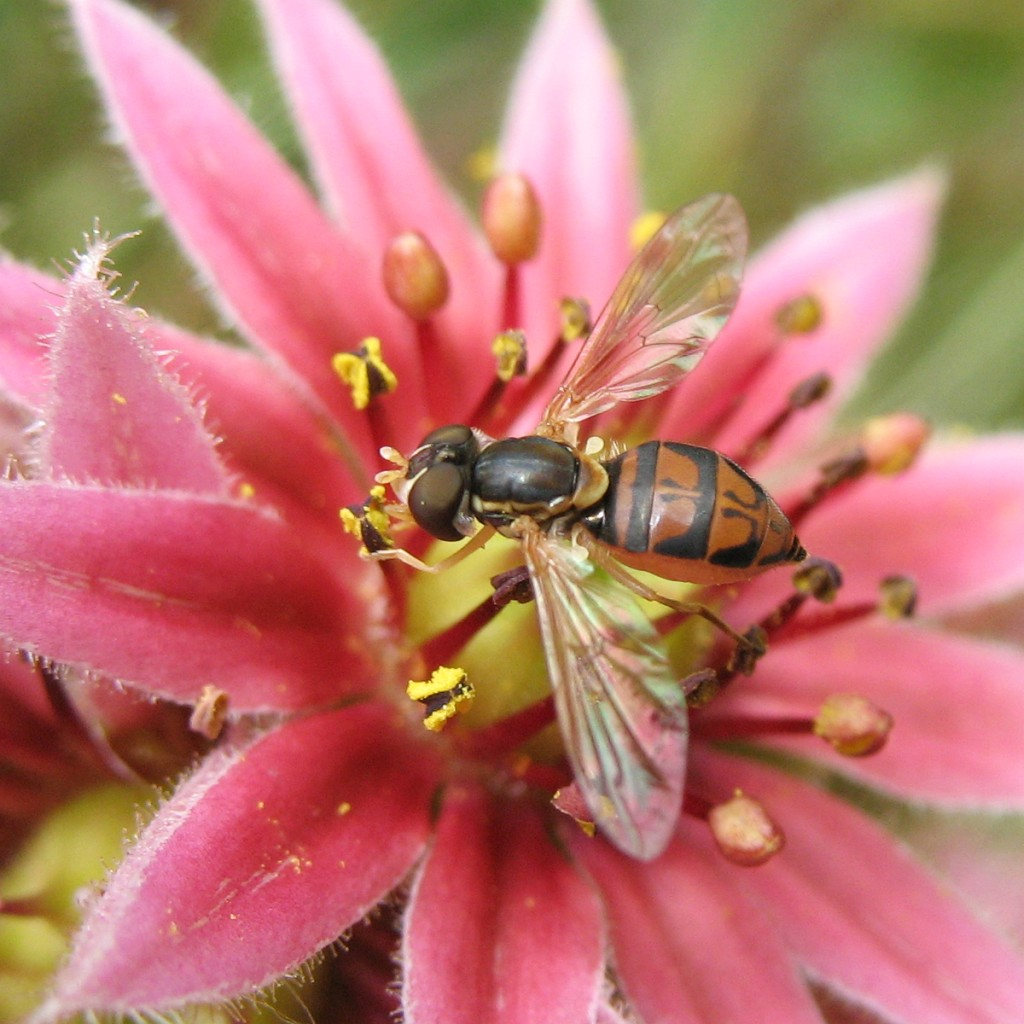
- Toxomerus marginatus female

Scientific classification
- Kingdom: Animalia
- Phylum: Arthropoda
- Class: Insecta
- Order: Diptera
- Family: Syrphidae
- Subfamily: Syrphinae
- Tribe: Syrphini
- Genus: Toxomerus; Macquart, 1855

Type species
- Toxomerus notatus Macquart, 1855

= Toxomerus =

Genus of flies

Female Western Calligrapher on zinnia taking pollen and nectar. Insert shows entire visit at 3X speed. Some portions of main video shown at one-tenth speed.

Female margined calligrapher fly consuming pollen from zinnia florets. A portion shown at one-tenth speed.

Toxomerus is a very large genus of hoverflies. They are found in many parts of North and South America. Most larvae are predators on soft bodied insects, though a few species have been shown to feed on pollen. Adults feed on the pollen of a wide range of flowers.

== Morphology ==
The majority of species are 6–9 mm in length. A common trait of species within the genus is their mimicry of stinging Hymenoptera to avoid predators. What distinguishes Toxomerus from other hoverflies is the posterior indentation of their eyes and unique abdominal patterns; the abdominal patterns are diagnostic at the species level within the genus. Eyes are large (taking up approximately 2/3 of head) and range from red to black in color. Males and females can be distinguished by the dorsal spacing of their eyes, with males having a narrow gap and females having more space showing their ocelli.

== Classification and distribution ==
Both molecular and morphological analysis have been used to establish Toxomerus monophyly. Not all of Toxomerus species have been described, though over 130 Neotropical species and 6 endemic Nearctic species are known. Some species have been discovered in the Old World in the afrotropics and are assumed to have been introduced due to their high genetic similarity to South American species. Toxomerus species are the most abundant hoverflies (or syrphid flies) in the Americas. Toxomerus marginatus is the most ubiquitous species in the North and is polyvoltine, brooding multiple times per year. Toxomerus dispar is the most common in the tropics, though T. pulchellus is more common in some areas.

== Biology and ecology ==
Although they are high fidelity hymenopteran mimics they do not engage in behavioral mimicking such as leg waving, wing wagging, and mock-stinging. They also have significantly less hair than bees. As in all flies, Toxomerus species have 4 life stages: egg, larva, pupa, adult. The lifespan of the average adult is about a month and can vary depending on the season with shorter spans in the summer and longer in the winter. Mating can occur midair or on the ground depending on species. A female can lay up to hundreds of eggs at a time and will place them where prey or pollen food sources are readily available. They can be found in a wide variety of habitats. Adults can be encountered in dense ground cover including grasses and leaves. Some can do well in urban environments and can be responsible for some pollination in gardens.

Toxomerus larvae are known to typically feed on aphids. Predatory Toxomerus larvae have also been found to feed on other Hemiptera, Acari, and Thysanoptera, along with Lepidoptera larvae. Though Toxomerus larvae are generally predatory, there are three known exceptions: Toxomerus apegiensis, Toxomerus politus, and Toxomerus floralis.T. politus larvae feed on the pollen of Zea mays (corn), and T. apegiensis larvae feed on the pollen of Olyra obliquifolia (bamboo). T. floralis, the larvae of which feed on pollen from Cyperus rotundus (Java grass) and Mitracarpus hirtus (tropical girdleweed), is the only species whose larvae are known to feed on plants from different families. Generally, little information is known about the larval biology of Toxomerus species. Research suggests that other phytophagous Toxomerus species may be found by searching plants related to rainforest Olyra species.

After the larval stage, Toxomerus species typically become pollinivorous as adults. Their diets as adults had made some species responsible for pollination in a variety of plant families, including Poaceae, Scrophulariaceae, Ericaceae, Cyperaceae, and Orobanchaceae. Adults and larvae will forage for pollen during the early daylight hours while their activity drops off at around late afternoon.

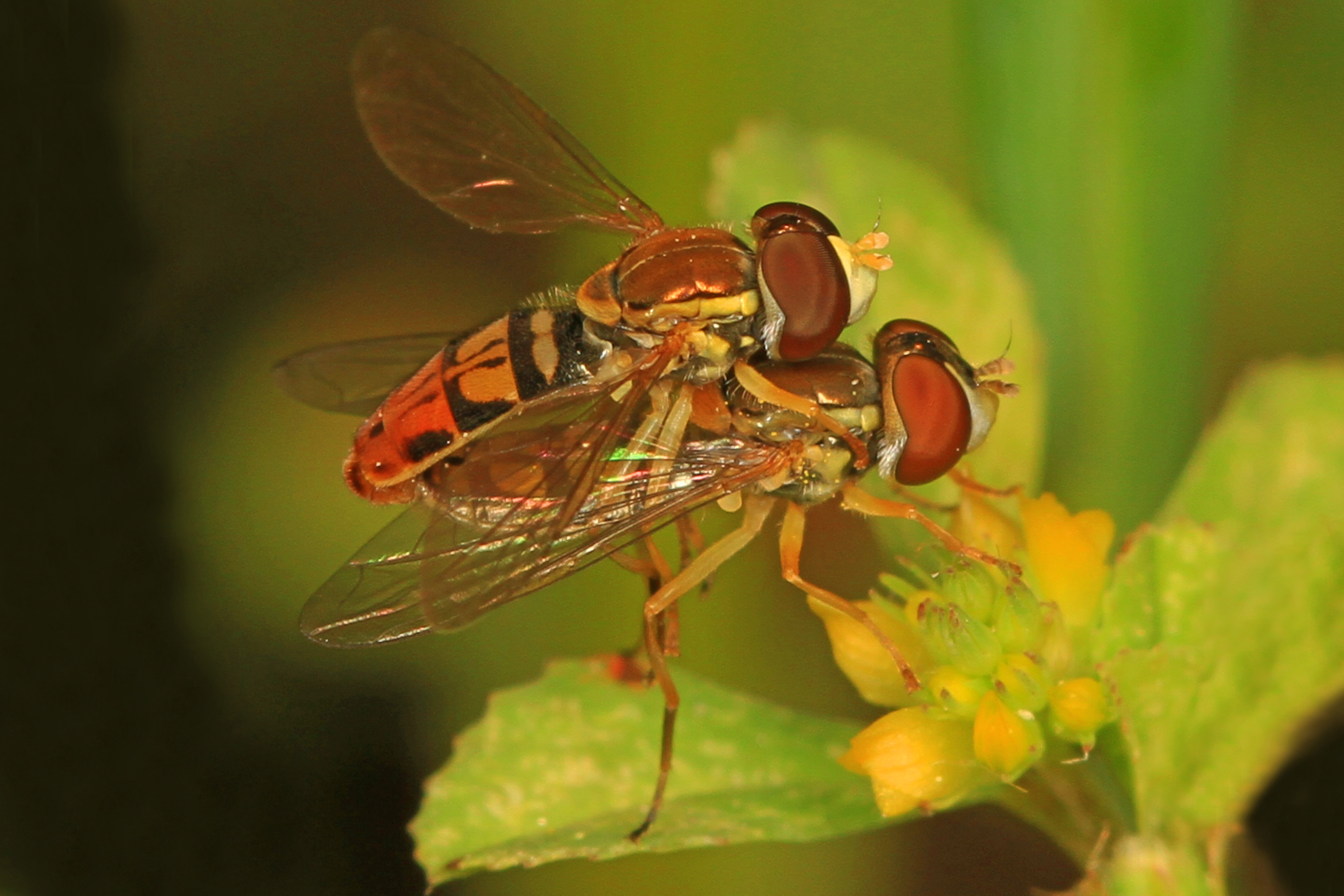
Toxomerus marginatus mating on a flower.

== Species ==
List of Toxomerus species
