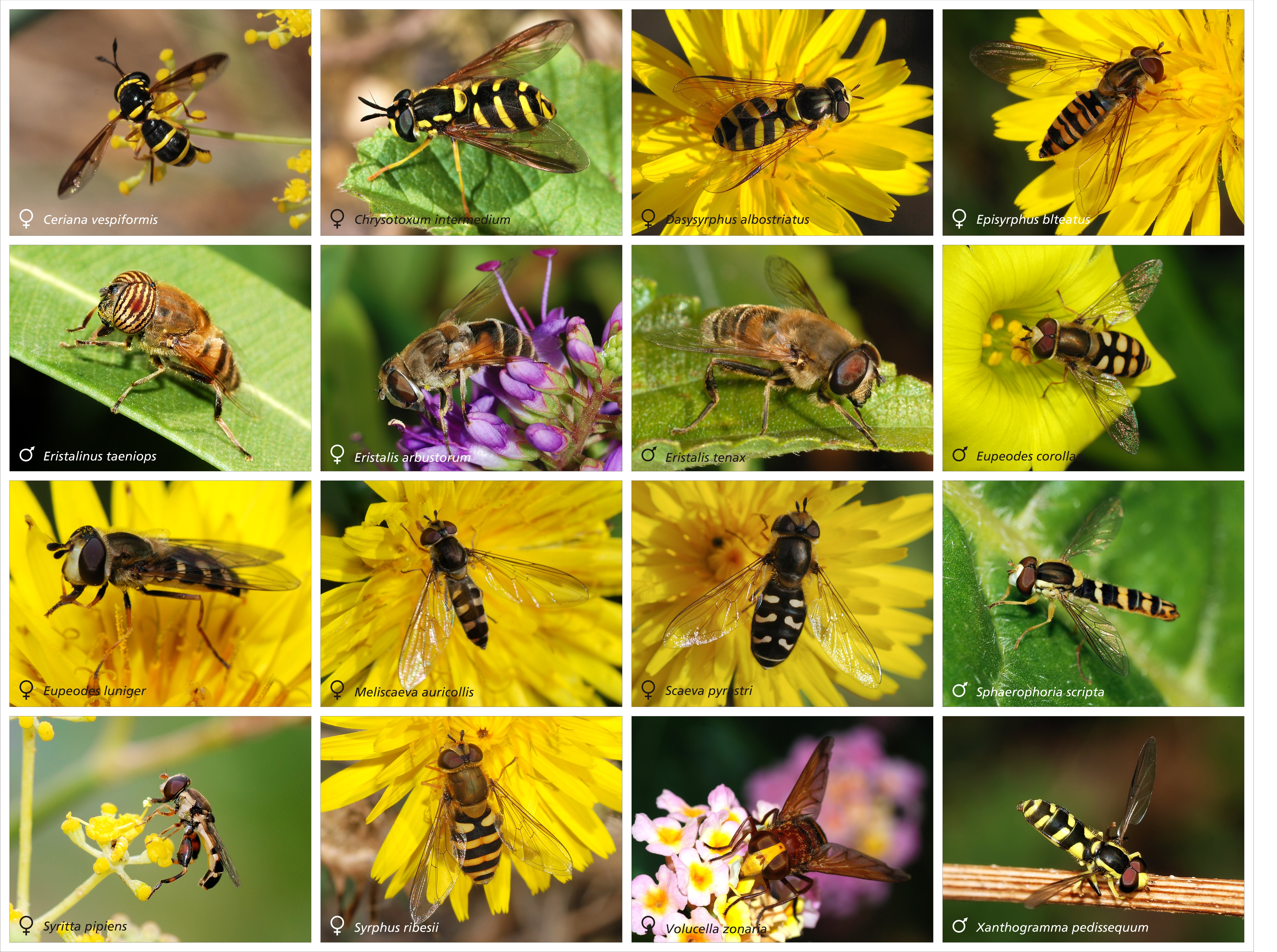
- Sixteen different species of hoverflies

Scientific classification
- Kingdom: Animalia
- Phylum: Arthropoda
- Clade: Pancrustacea
- Class: Insecta
- Order: Diptera
- Section: Aschiza
- Superfamily: Syrphoidea
- Family: Syrphidae; Latreille, 1802

Subfamilies
- Eristalinae; Microdontinae; Pipizinae; Syrphinae

= Hoverfly =

Syrphidae Temporal range: Eocene–present

Family of insects

Hoverflies or hover flies, also called flower flies or syrphids, make up the insect family Syrphidae. As their common name suggests, they are often seen hovering, maintaining a spot in the air as part of their display behavior; the adults of many species feed mainly on nectar and pollen, while the larvae (maggots) eat a wide range of foods. In some species, the larvae are saprotrophs, specifically detritivores, eating decaying plant and animal matter in the soil or in ponds and streams. In other species, the larvae are insectivores, preying on aphids, thrips, and other plant-sucking insects.

Insects such as aphids are considered crop pests, so the aphid-eating larvae of some hoverflies are economically and ecologically important. The larvae are potential agents for use in biological control, while the adults are pollinators.

About 6,000 species in 200 genera have been described. Hoverflies are common throughout the world and can be found on all continents except Antarctica. Hoverflies are harmless to most mammals, though many species are mimics of stinging wasps and bees, a mimicry which may serve to ward off predators.

Hoverfly hovering behavior is unlike that of hummingbirds since they do not feed in midair. Hovering in general may be a means of finding a food source. Male hovering is often a territorial display while seeking females, while female hovering serves to inspect ovipositing sites.

Adult hoverflies often hover over the plants they visit

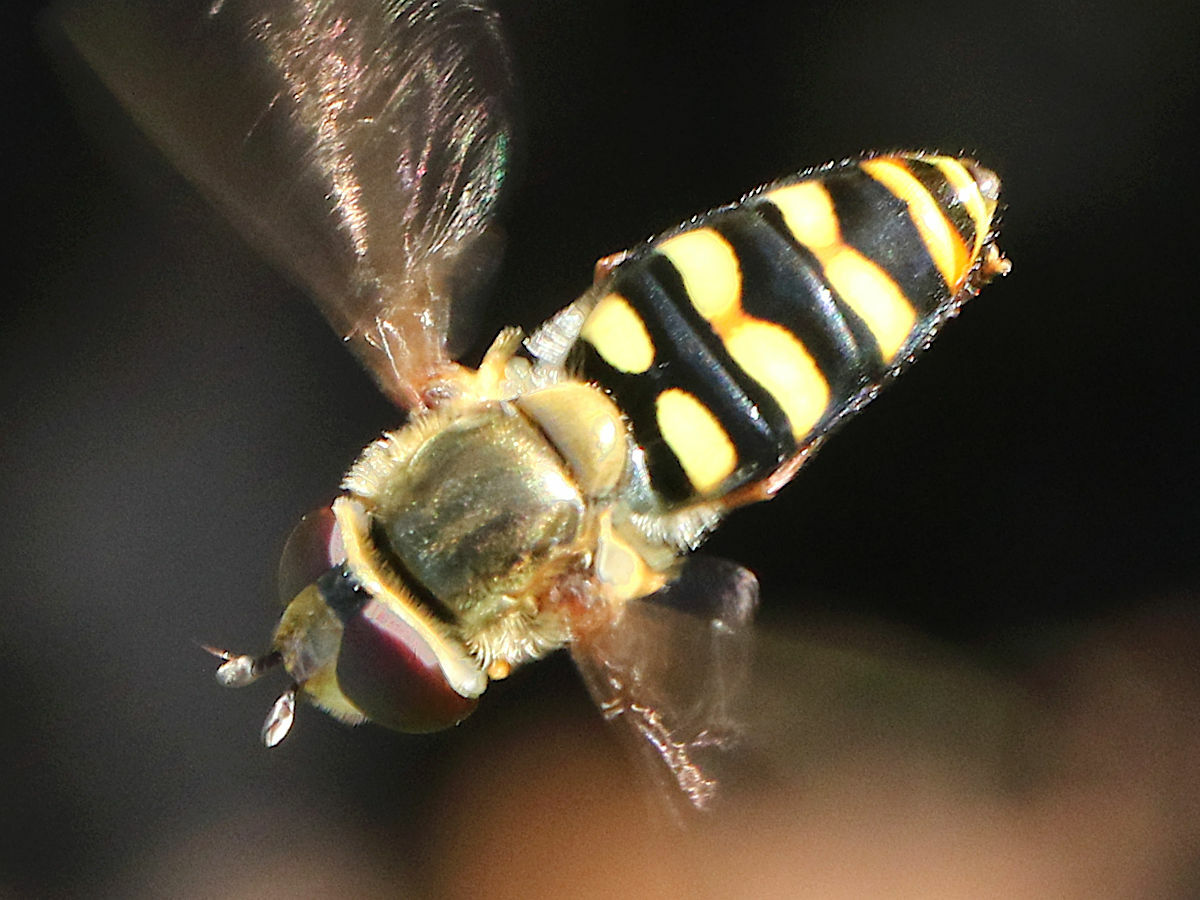
Eupeodes fumipennis

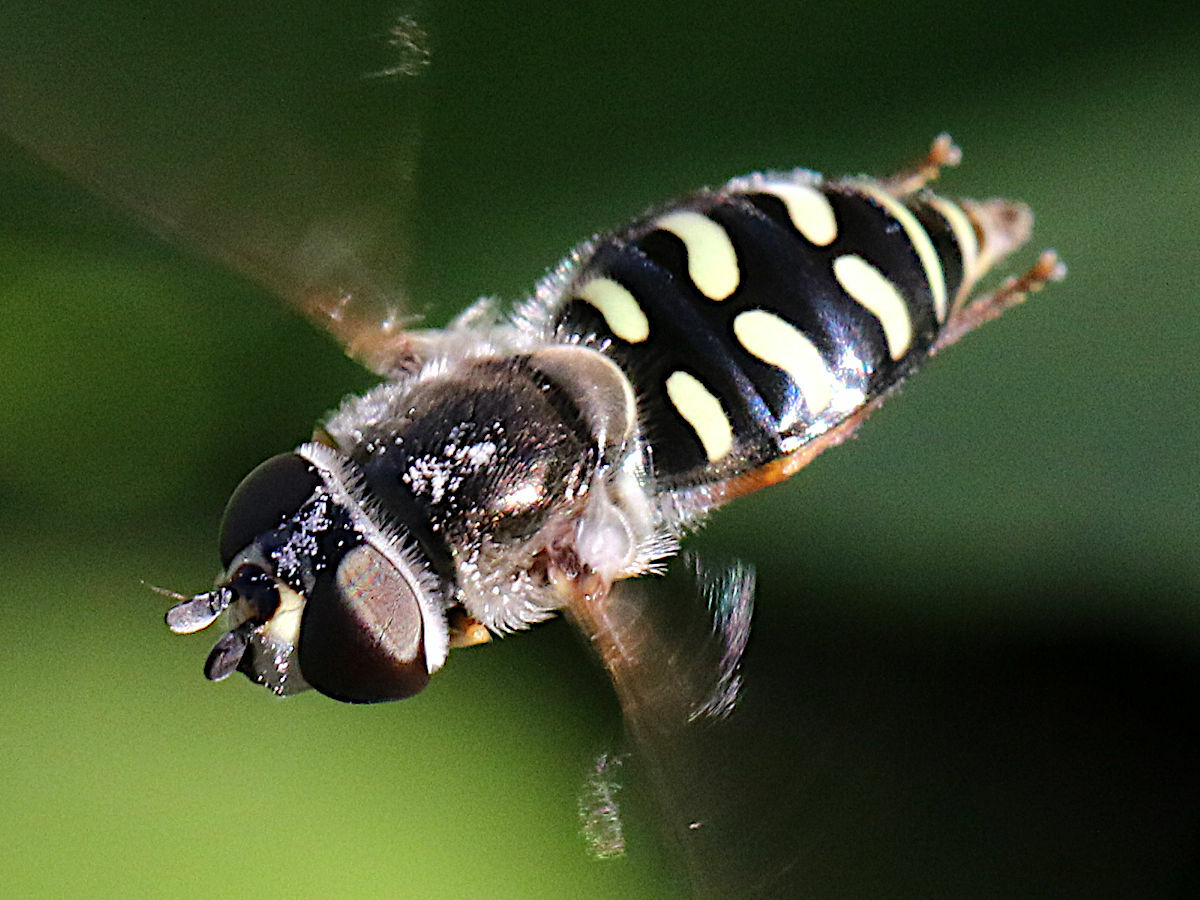
Eupeodes volucris

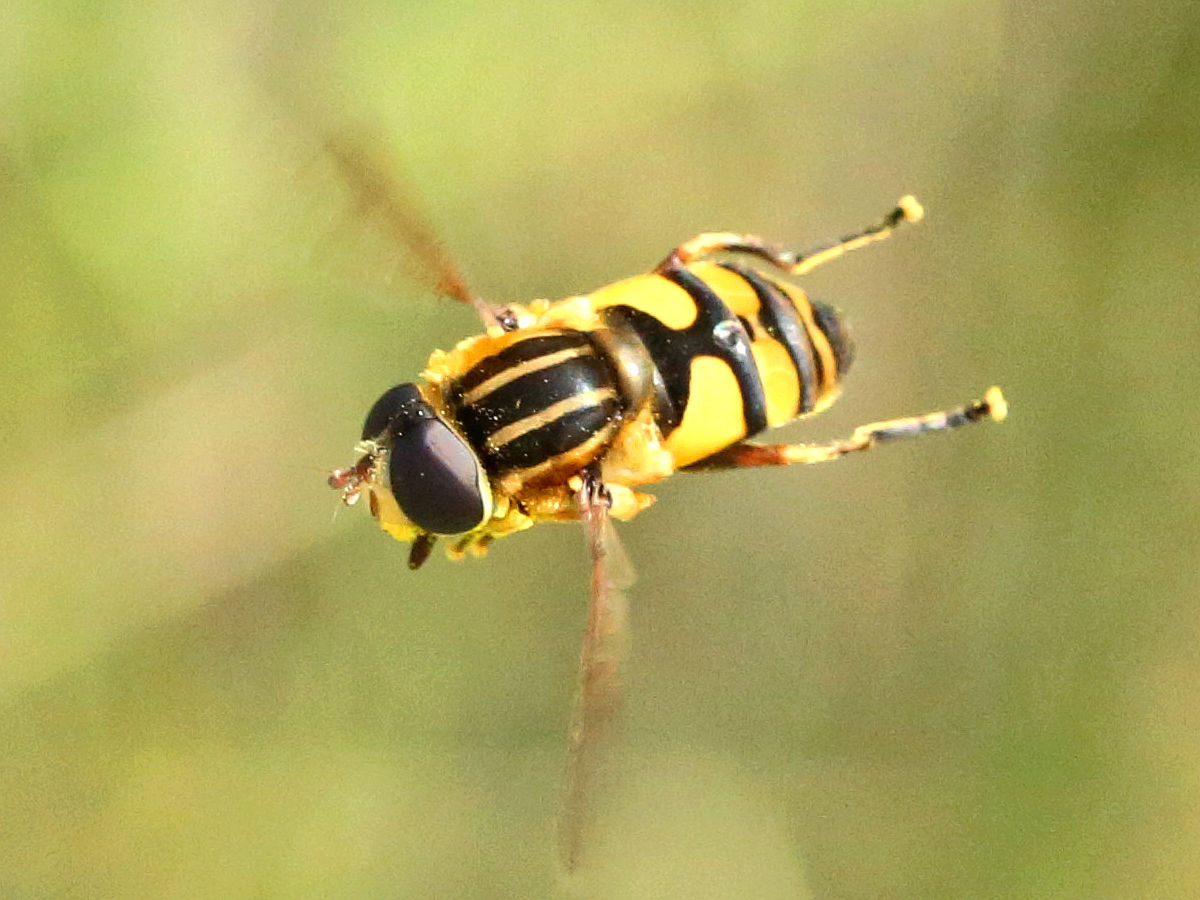
Helophilus fasciatus

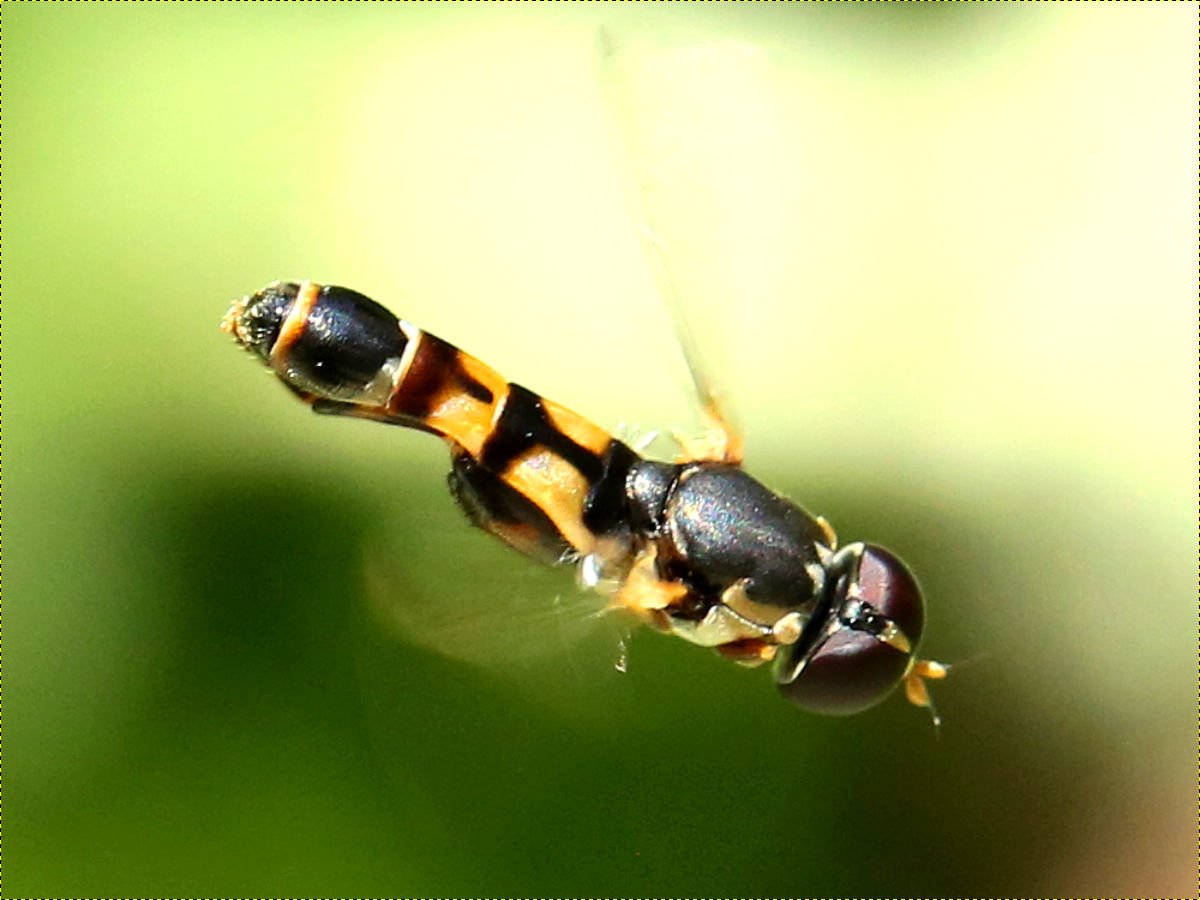
Syritta pipiens

A hoverfly on flowers in Japan

A purple bromeliad fly visiting Paris daisy, variety Madeira deep pink. Last scene is repeated at one fourth speed

A female common drone fly on Zinnia. A portion shown in close-up played at one-tenth place

Female Western Calligrapher on zinnia taking pollen and nectar. Insert shows entire visit at 3X speed. Some portions of main video shown at one-tenth speed

Female margined calligrapher fly consuming pollen from zinnia florets. A portion shown at one-tenth speed

== Description ==
The size of hoverflies varies depending on the species. For example Paragus tibialis is 3–5 mm (1/8–13/64 in) long, while Criorhina nigriventris is 13.6–20.6 mm (17/32–13/16 in) long. Some, such as members of the genus Baccha, are small, elongated, and slender, while others, such as members of Criorhina, are large, hairy, and yellow and black. As members of the Diptera, all hoverflies have a single functional pair of wings, with the hind wings reduced to balancing organs. Many species are brightly colored, with spots, stripes, and bands of yellow or brown covering their bodies. Due to this coloration, they are often mistaken both by insect-eating birds and by humans for wasps or bees; they exhibit Batesian mimicry. Despite this, hoverflies are harmless to humans. Drone flies, Eristalis tenax, resemble honeybees, an example of Batesian mimicry.

With a few exceptions, Hoverflies are distinguished from other flies by having a spurious vein, located parallel to their fourth longitudinal wing vein. Adults feed mainly on nectar and pollen. Many species also hover around flowers, lending to their common name.

Bee flies of the family Bombyliidae often mimic Hymenoptera and hover around flowers, as well, rendering some bombyliid species hard to tell apart from Syrphidae at first glance. Hoverflies can, nevertheless, be distinguished in the field by anatomical features such as:

- The legs and mouthparts of hoverflies are usually not particularly long and thin (some bombyliids have a long and needle-like proboscis, many have legs that are noticeably longer and thinner than in similar-sized syrphids)
- Their facial cuticle often has prominent bulges and/or beak- to knob-like projections (most bee flies have an evenly curved or sloping face).
- The wings are often clear or have smooth gradients of tinting, and their veins merge posteriorly into a "false edge" that runs parallel to the wing's true rear edge and extends along half or more of the wing length (bombyliid wings lack a "false rear edge" and often have large dark areas with sharp boundaries, or complex patterns of spots).
- Their abdomens and thoraces often have glossy cuticular body surfaces, abdominal colors are usually mainly due to cuticular pigments (bee flies are usually very hairy, their abdominal colors are almost always due to pigmentation of hairs and not the underlying cuticle).

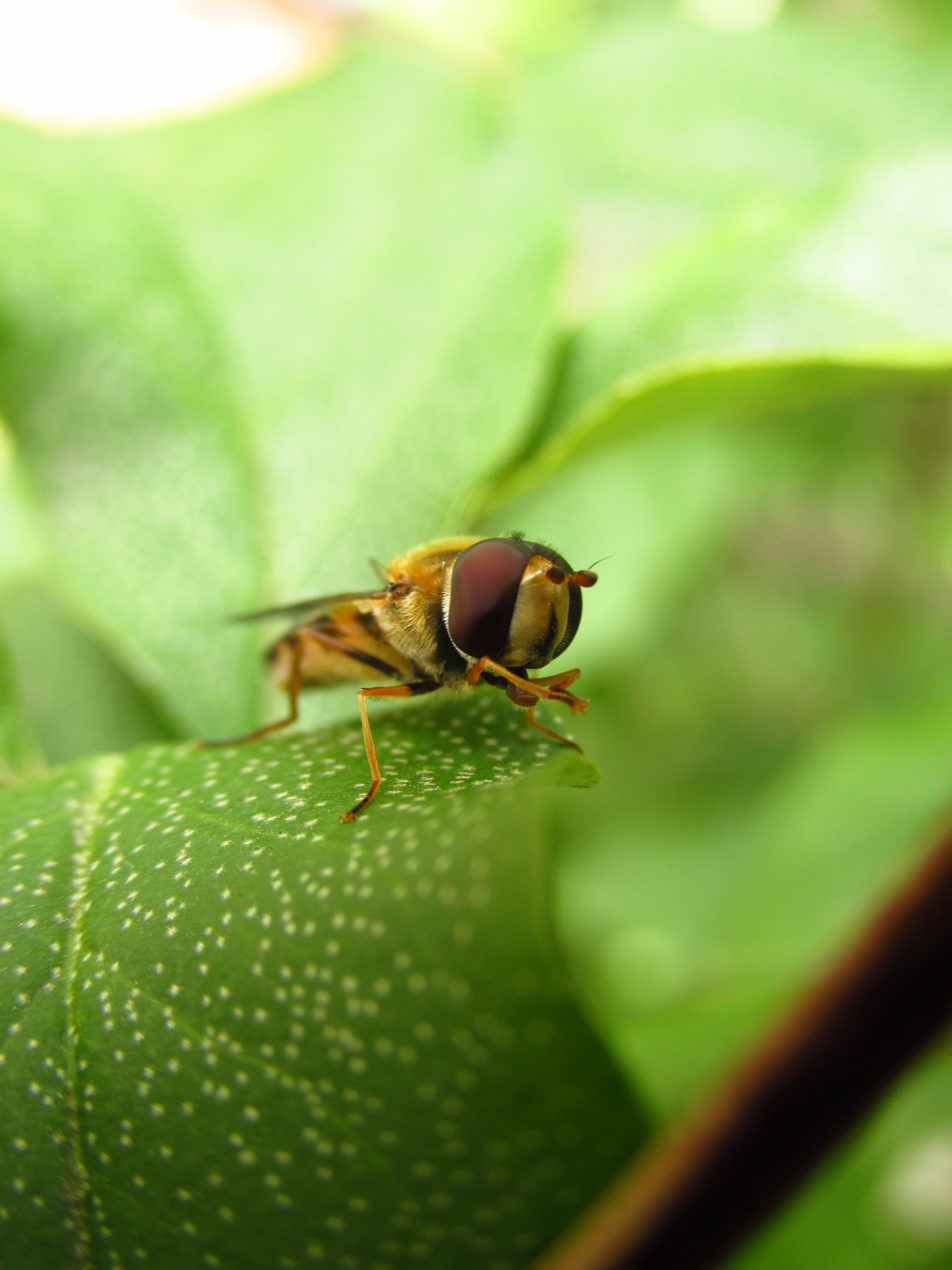
Their wariness of people is surprisingly low, and their behaviour can be observed up close.

== Reproduction and life cycle ==
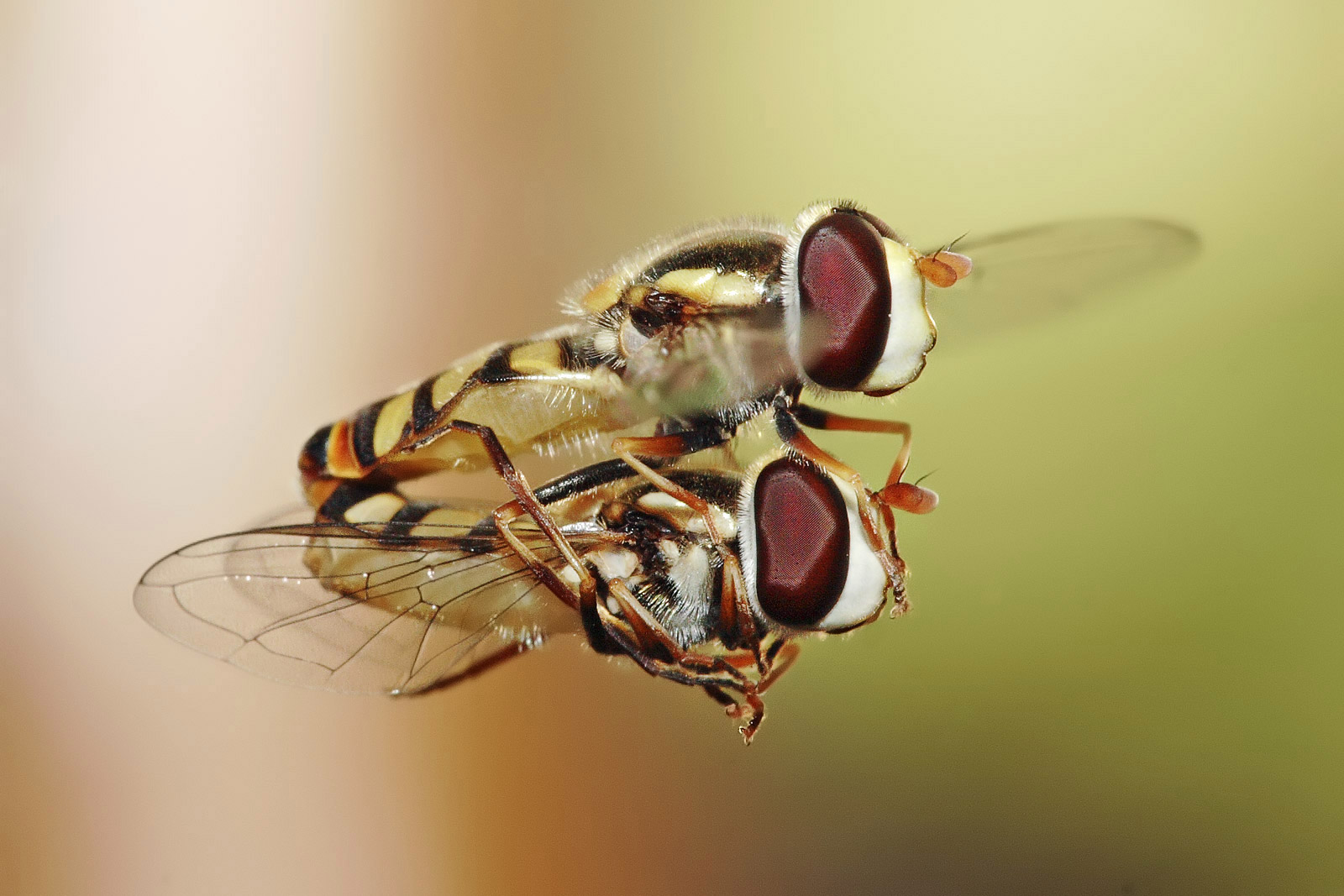
Midair mating of Simosyrphus grandicornis

Unlike adults, the maggots of hoverflies feed on a variety of foods. Some are saprotrophs, eating decaying plant or animal matter, while others are insectivores, eating aphids, thrips, and other plant-sucking insects. Predatory species are beneficial to farmers and gardeners, because aphids destroy crops, and hoverfly maggots are often used in biological control. That includes one of the most common widespread hoverfly species, Episyrphus balteatus, the larvae of which feed on aphids.

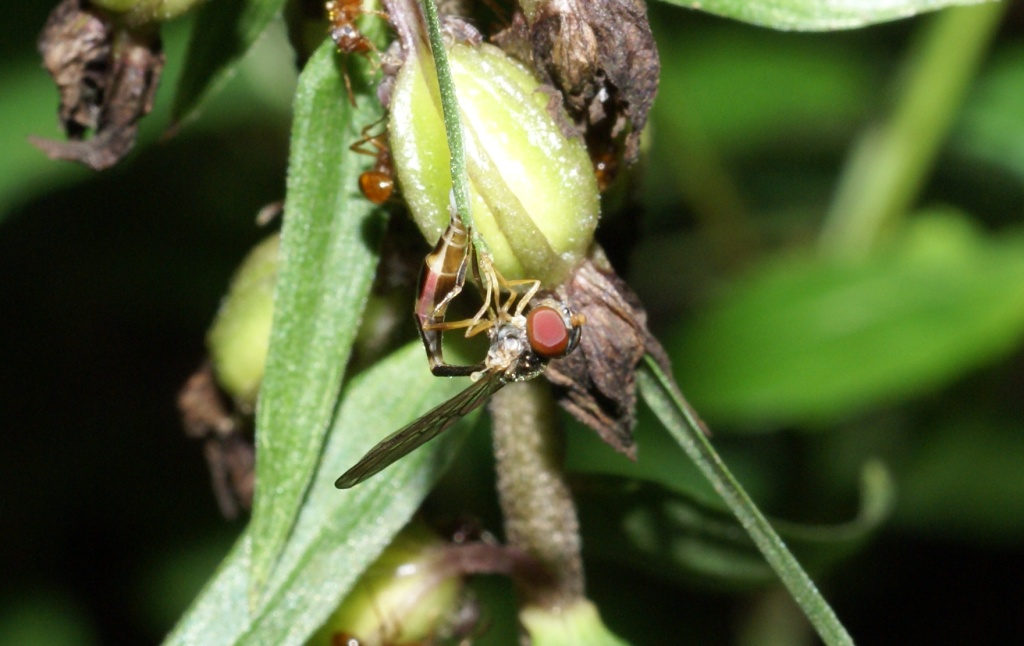
Hoverfly depositing egg on Epipactis helleborine which has ants farming aphids

An example of a well-known hoverfly maggot is the rat-tailed maggot of the drone fly, Eristalis tenax. It has a breathing siphon at its rear end, giving it its name. The species lives in stagnant water, such as sewage and lagoons. The maggots also have a commercial use, and are sometimes sold for ice fishing.

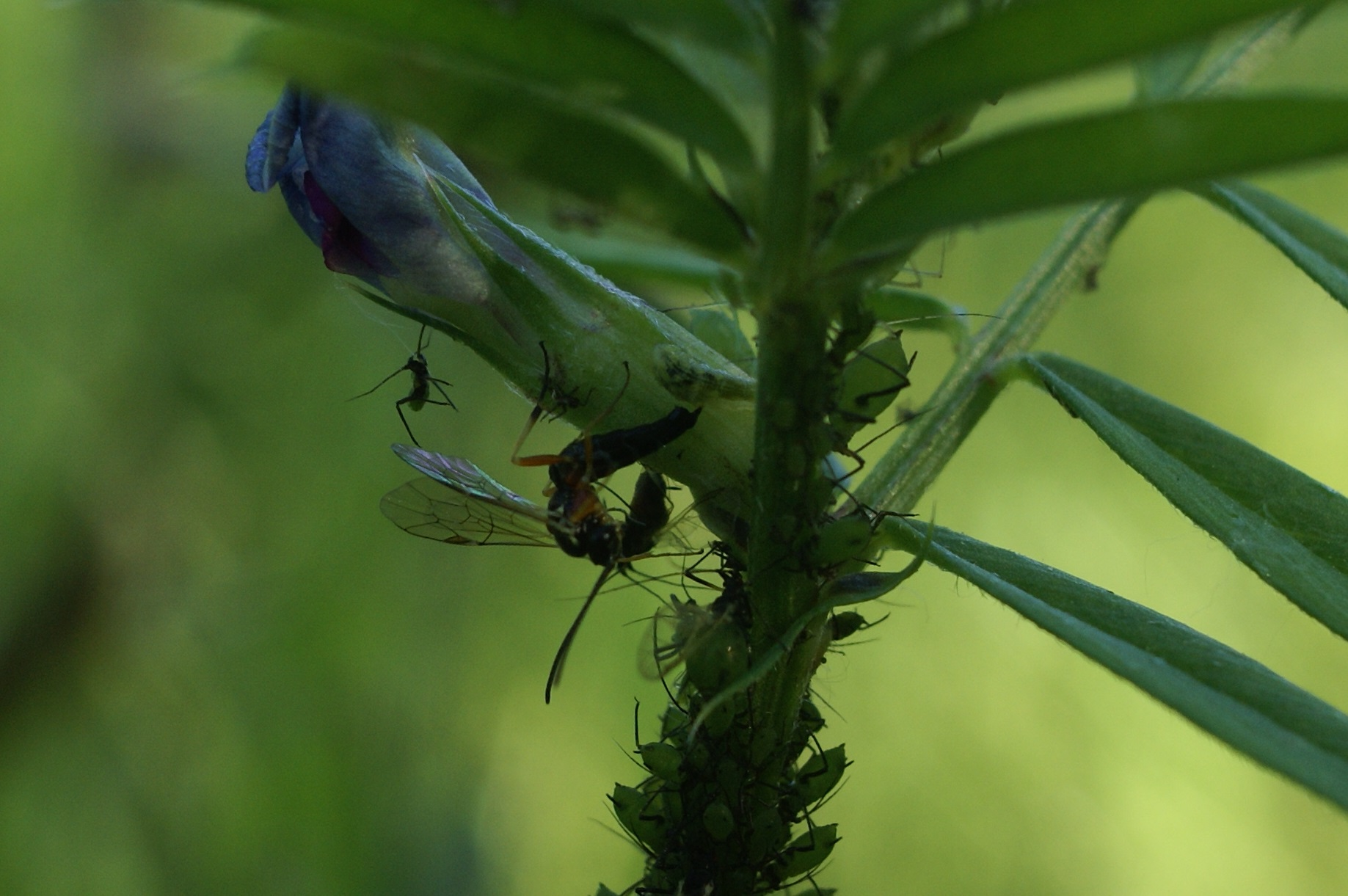
An ichneumonid wasp ovipositing inside a hoverfly larva

Very rarely, hoverfly larvae have caused accidental myiasis in humans. That occurs when the larvae are accidentally ingested from contaminated food.

== Evolution ==
The oldest known fossils of crown group Syrphidae are from the Eocene aged Florissant Formation, Green River Formation and Baltic amber. The genus Prosyrphus, found in Late Cretaceous (Cenomanian) Burmese amber, appears to represent a stem group to the family.

== Distribution and habitat ==
Hoverflies are a cosmopolitan family found in most biomes, except extreme deserts, tundra at extremely high latitudes, and Antarctica. Certain species are more common in certain areas than others; for example, the American hoverfly, Eupeodes americanus, is common in the Nearctic realm, and the common hoverfly, Melangyna viridiceps, is common in the Australasian realm. About 6,000 species and 200 genera are in the family.

While some hoverfly larvae are aquatic and are often found in stagnant water, those of species that prey upon aphids and other plant parasites are usually terrestrial, residing on leaves. Adults are often found near flowers, their principal food source being nectar and pollen. Some species are inquilines; for instance, members of the genus Volucella can be found in bumblebee nests, while members of Microdon are myrmecophiles, found in ant or termite nests. Others can be found in decomposing vegetation.

== Pollination ==
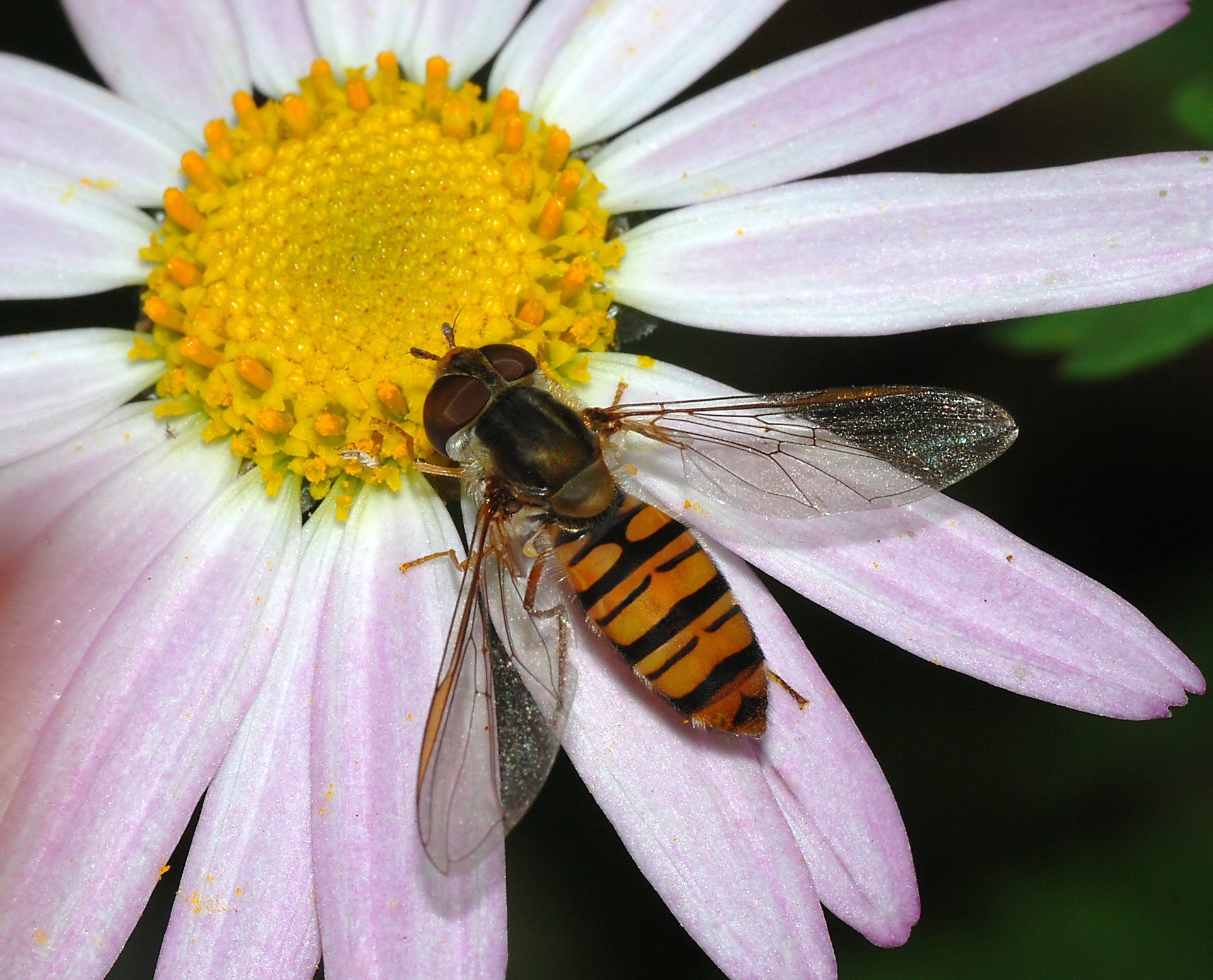
Episyrphus balteatus on a daisy

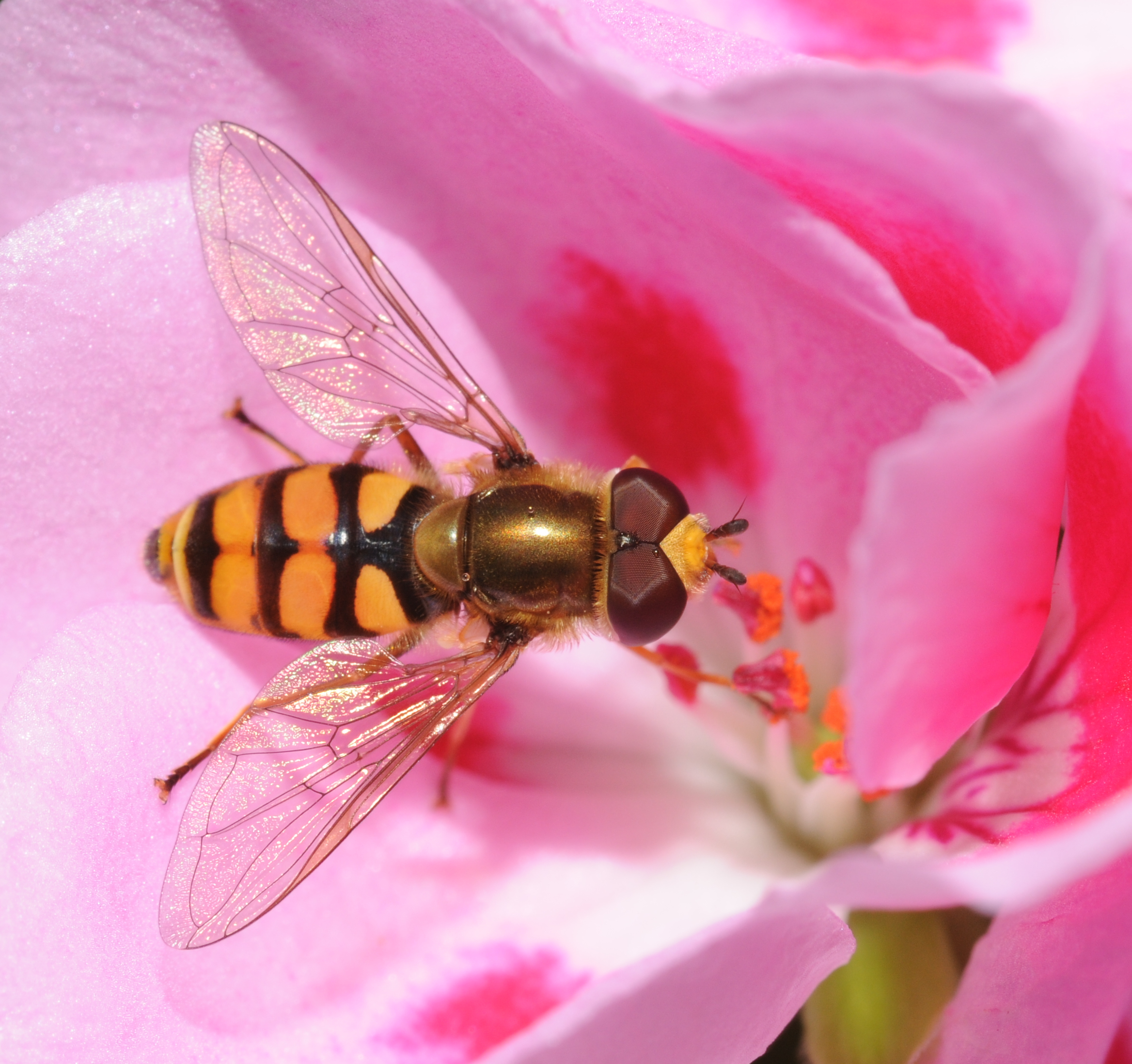
Eupeodes corollae

Hoverflies are important pollinators of flowering plants in many ecosystems worldwide. Syrphid flies are frequent flower visitors to a wide range of wild plants, as well as agricultural crops, and are often considered the second-most important group of pollinators after wild bees. Relatively little research into fly pollinators has been conducted, compared to bees. Bees are thought to be able to carry a greater volume of pollen on their bodies, but flies may be able to compensate for this by making a greater number of flower visits.

Like many pollinator groups, syrphid flies range from species that take a generalist approach to foraging by visiting a wide range of plant species through those that specialize in a narrow range of plants. Although hoverflies are often considered mainly nonselective pollinators, some hoverflies species are highly selective and carry pollen from one plant species. Cheilosia albitarsis is thought to only visit Ranunculus repens.

Specific flower preferences differ among species, but syrphid fly species have repeatedly been shown to prefer white- and yellow-coloured flowers. Nonvisual flower cues such as olfactory cues also help these flies to find flowers, especially those that are not yellow. Many syrphid fly species have short, unspecialized mouth parts and tend to feed on flowers that are more open as the nectar and pollen can be easily accessed.

Also, a number of interactions occur between orchids and hoverflies. The orchid species Epipactis veratrifolia mimics alarm pheromones of aphids which attracts pollinating hoverflies. Another plant, the slipper orchid in southwest China, also achieves pollination by deceit by exploiting the innate yellow color preference of syrphids.

== Relationship with humans ==
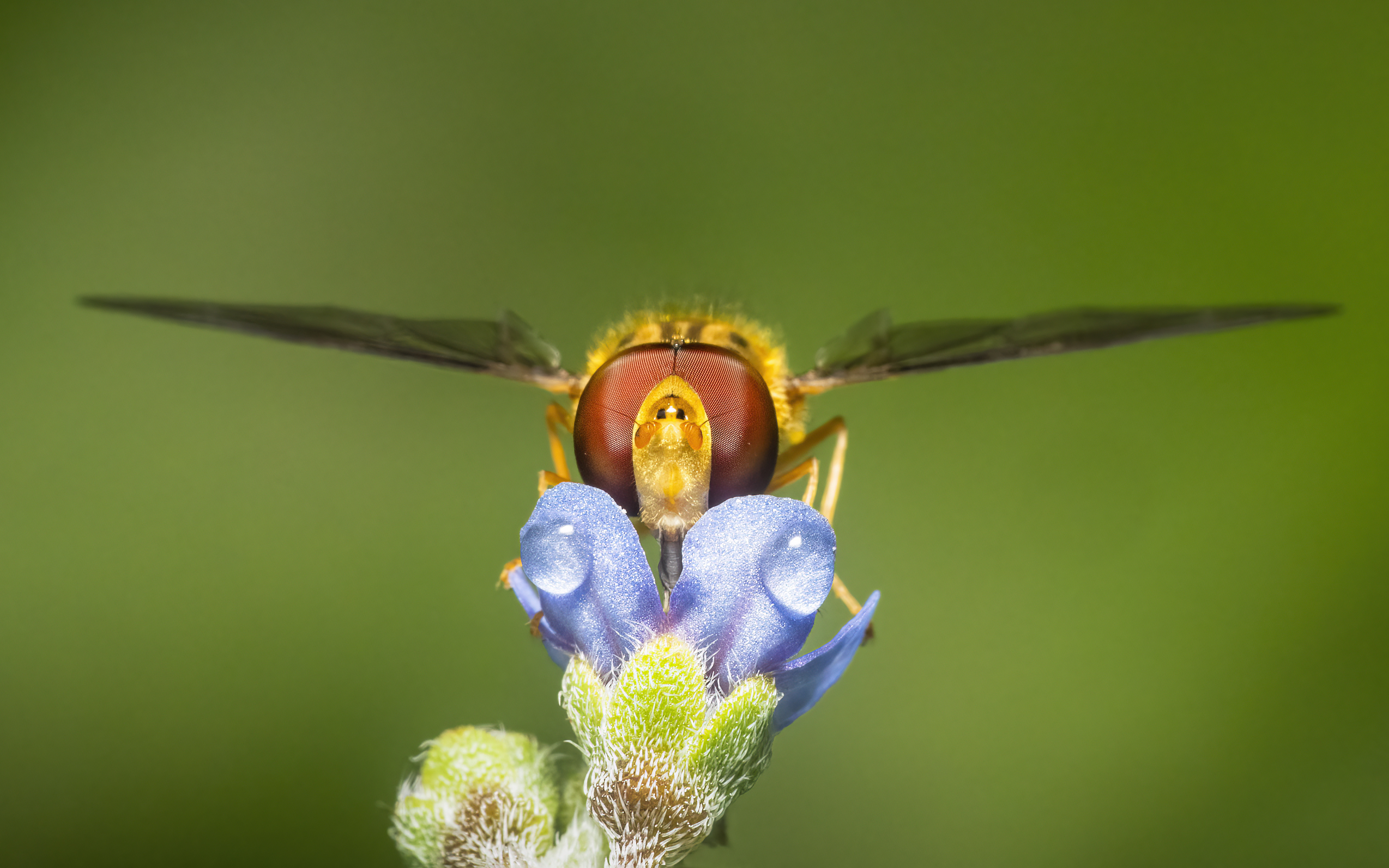
Hoverfly nectaring on a small flower bud covered with dew drops.

Hoverflies (adult syrphid flies) are pollinators.

Larvae of many hoverfly species prey upon pest insects, including aphids and leafhoppers, which spread some diseases such as curly top, so they are seen in biocontrol as a natural means of reducing levels of pests. Gardeners, therefore, sometimes use companion plants to attract hoverflies. Those reputed to do so include Alyssum spp., Iberis umbellata, statice, buckwheat, chamomile, parsley, and yarrow. Many syrphids, such as Toxomerus marginatus, are attracted to herbivore-induced plant volatiles, and there are commercial formulations of said volatiles, like methyl salicylate, which can be used to attract them for biocontrol purposes. Larvae in the subfamily Eristalinae live in semi-aquatic and aquatic environments, including manure and compost, and can filter and purify water.

Fredrik Sjöberg's book The Fly Trap concerns his enthusiasm for hoverflies on the island of Runmarö in the Baltic Sea. The island is a hotspot for hoverflies and other insects; Sjöberg has collected 58 species of butterflies there, and (in seven years of hunting) 202 species of hoverflies, including 180 in his garden.

== Identification guides ==
- Skevington, J.H., et al., 2019. Field Guide to the Flower Flies of Northeastern North America. Princeton University Press ISBN 9780691189406. This book "covers all 413 known syrphid species that occur in or north of Virginia, Kentucky, and Missouri, west to include Iowa, Minnesota, Ontario, and Nunavut, and east to the Atlantic Ocean, including Greenland."
- Stubbs, A.E. and Falk, S.J. (2002) British Hoverflies An Illustrated Identification Guide. Pub. 1983 with 469 pages, 12 col plates, b/w illus. British Entomological and Natural History Society ISBN 1-899935-05-3. 276 species are described with extensive keys to aid identification. It displays 190 species on colour plates. 2nd edition, pub. 2002, includes new British species and name changes. It includes European species likely to appear in Britain. Additional black and white plates illustrate the male genitalia of the difficult genera Cheilosia and Sphaerophoria.
- van Veen, M.P. (2004) Hoverflies of Northwest Europe: Identification Keys to the Syrphidae. KNNV Publishing, Utrecht ISBN 9050111998.
- Miranda G.F.G., Young A.D., Locke M.M., Marshall S.A., Skevington J.H., Thompson F.C. (2013) Key to the Genera of Nearctic Syrphidae. doi:10.3752/cjai.2013.23
- Bot, S. and Van de Meutter, F. (2023) Hoverflies of Britain and North-west Europe: A photographic guide (Bloomsbury Naturalist). ISBN 978-1-3994-0245-3.

== Regional lists ==
- List of hoverfly species of Great Britain
- List of the Syrphidae of Ireland
- List of flower flies of New Zealand
- List of the flower flies of North America
- Syrphidae of New York State
