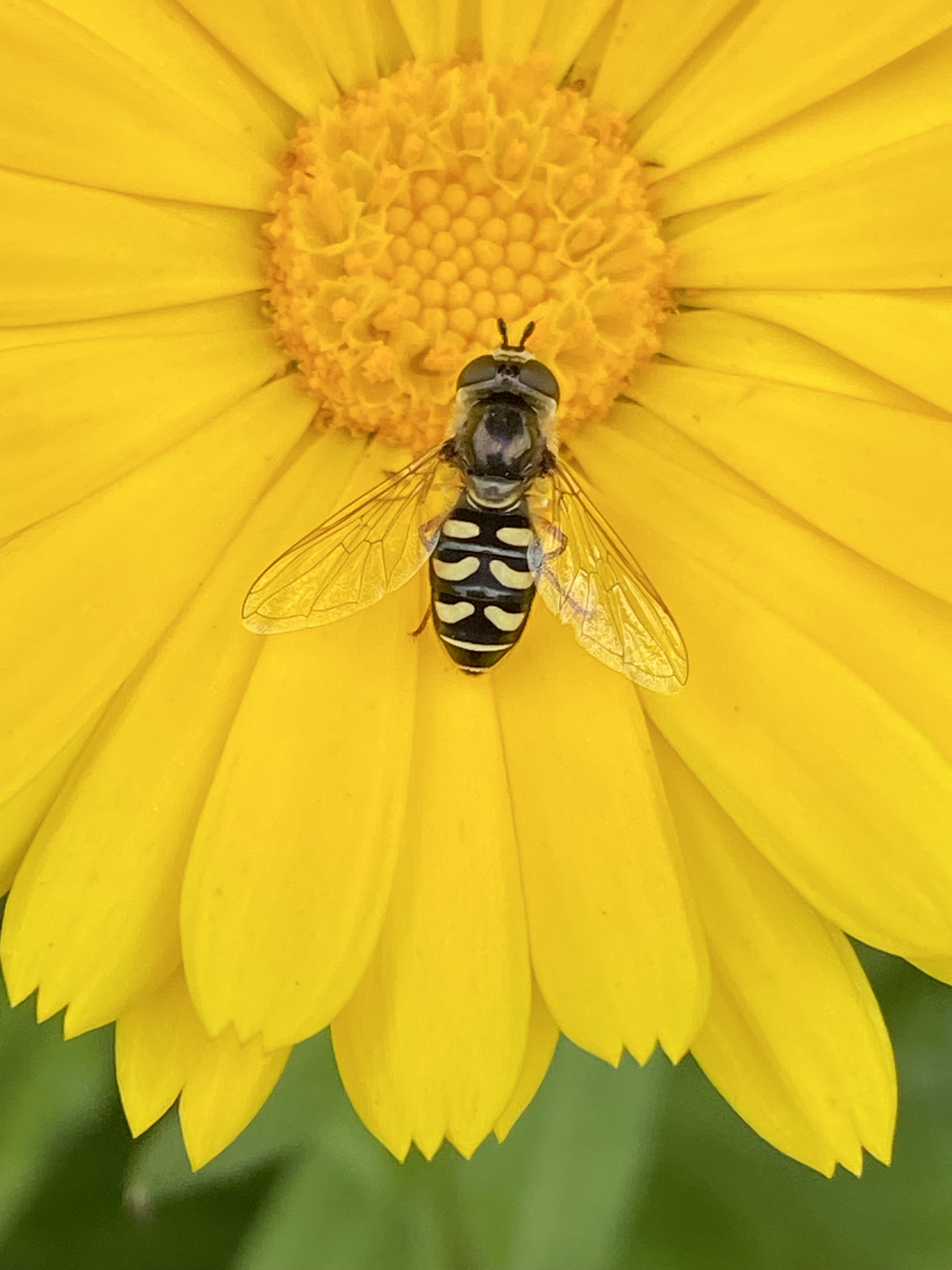

Scientific classification
- Kingdom: Animalia
- Phylum: Arthropoda
- Clade: Pancrustacea
- Class: Insecta
- Order: Diptera
- Family: Syrphidae
- Genus: Eupeodes
- Species: E. volucris

Binomial name
- Eupeodes volucris Osten Sacken, 1877

Synonyms
- Eupeodes braggii Jones, 1917; Eupeodes weldoni Jones, 1917; Syrphus perpallidus Bigot, 1884

= Eupeodes volucris =

Species of fly

Eupeodes volucris, the large-tailed aphideater or bird hover fly, is a species of hover fly in the family Syrphidae. As its "aphideater" name implies, larvae prey on plant-sucking insects, primarily aphids.

The "hover" part of the family name derives from the fact that adults often hover over the plants they visit.

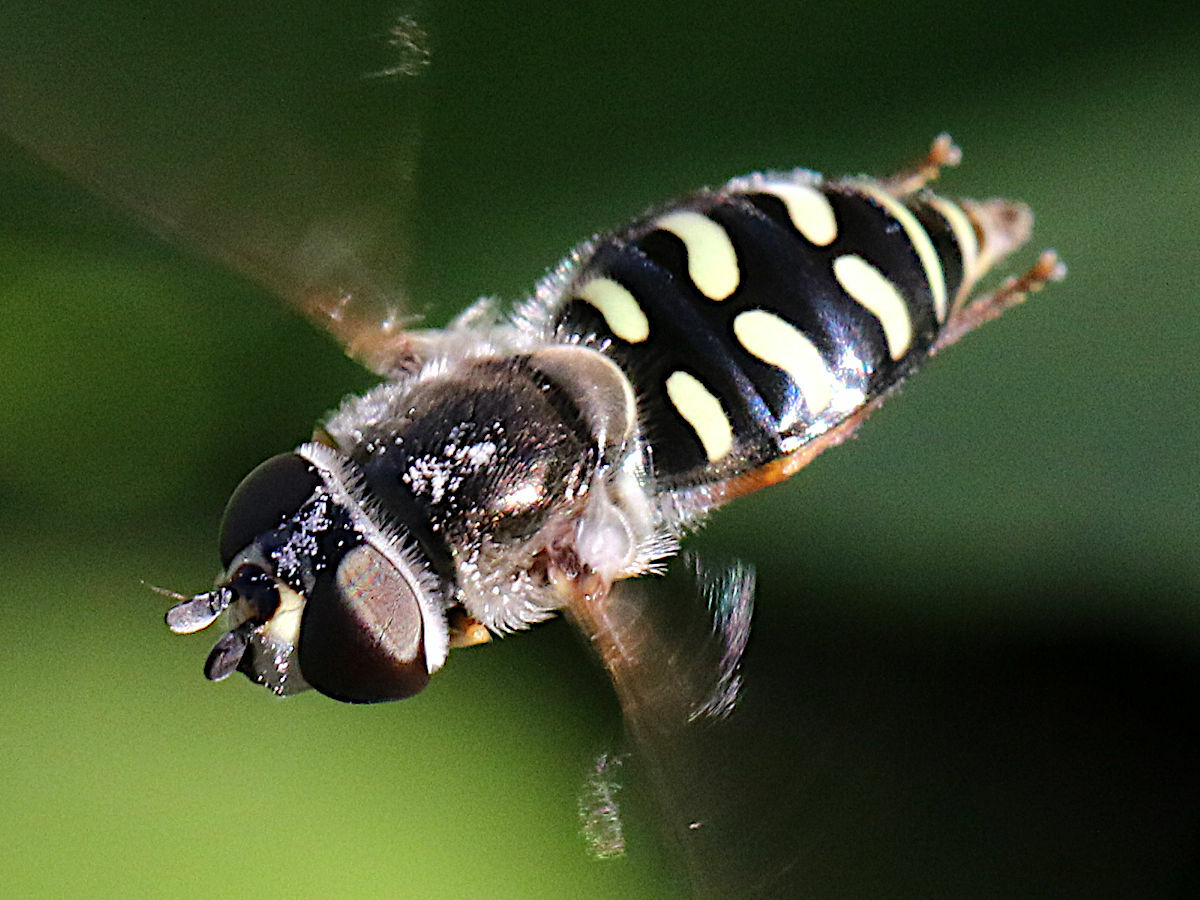
Female hovering

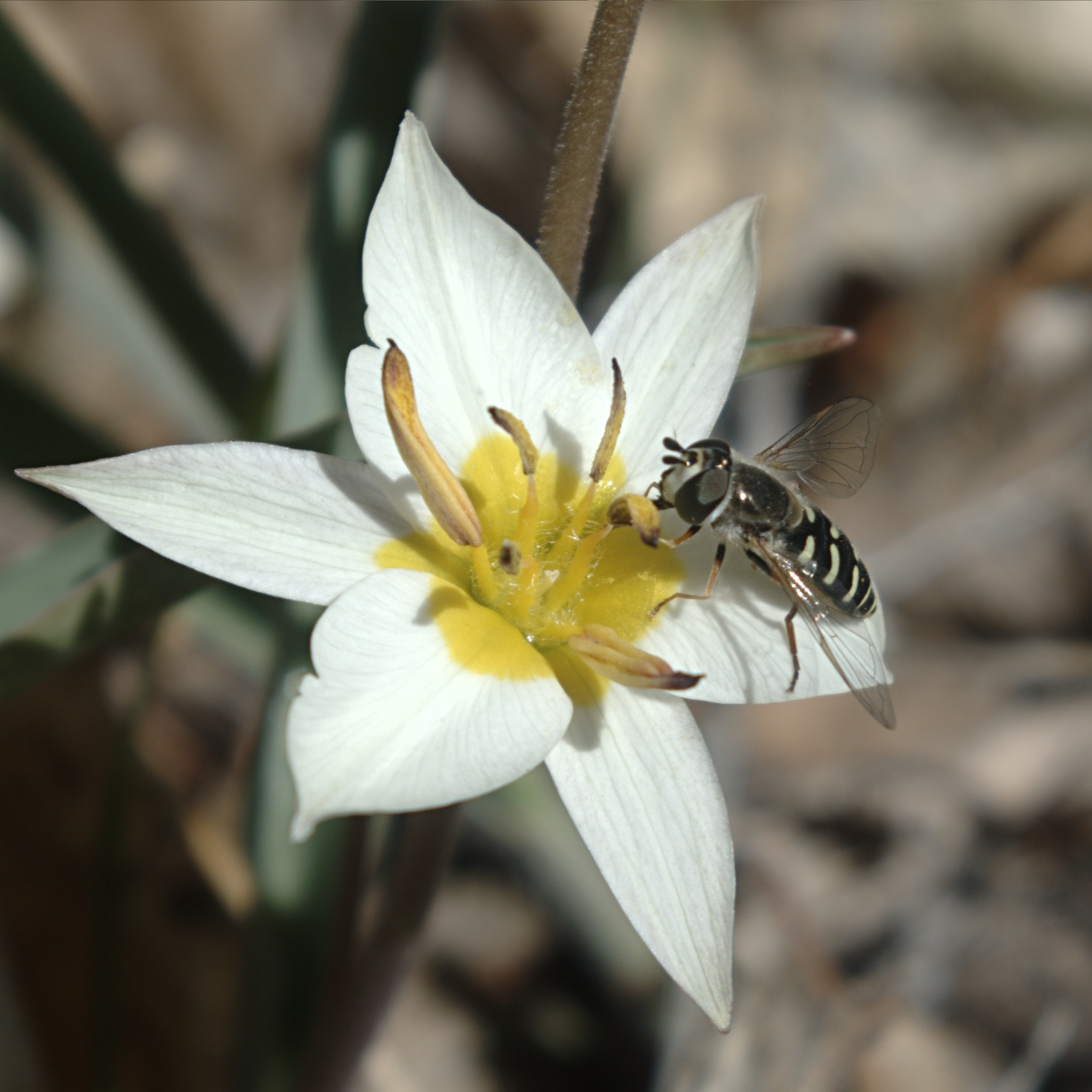
Bird hover fly, Eupeodes volucris

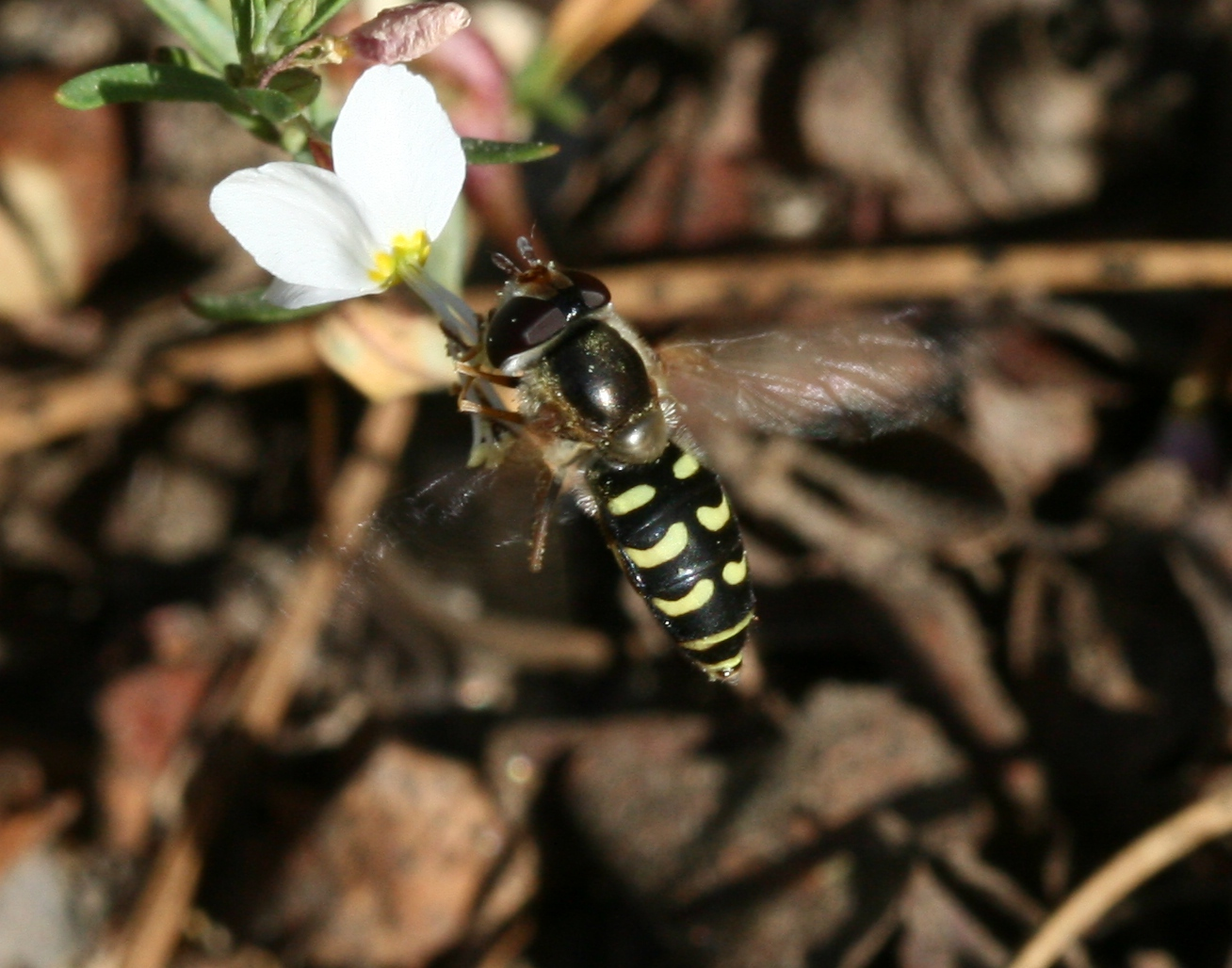
Bird hover fly, Eupeodes volucris
