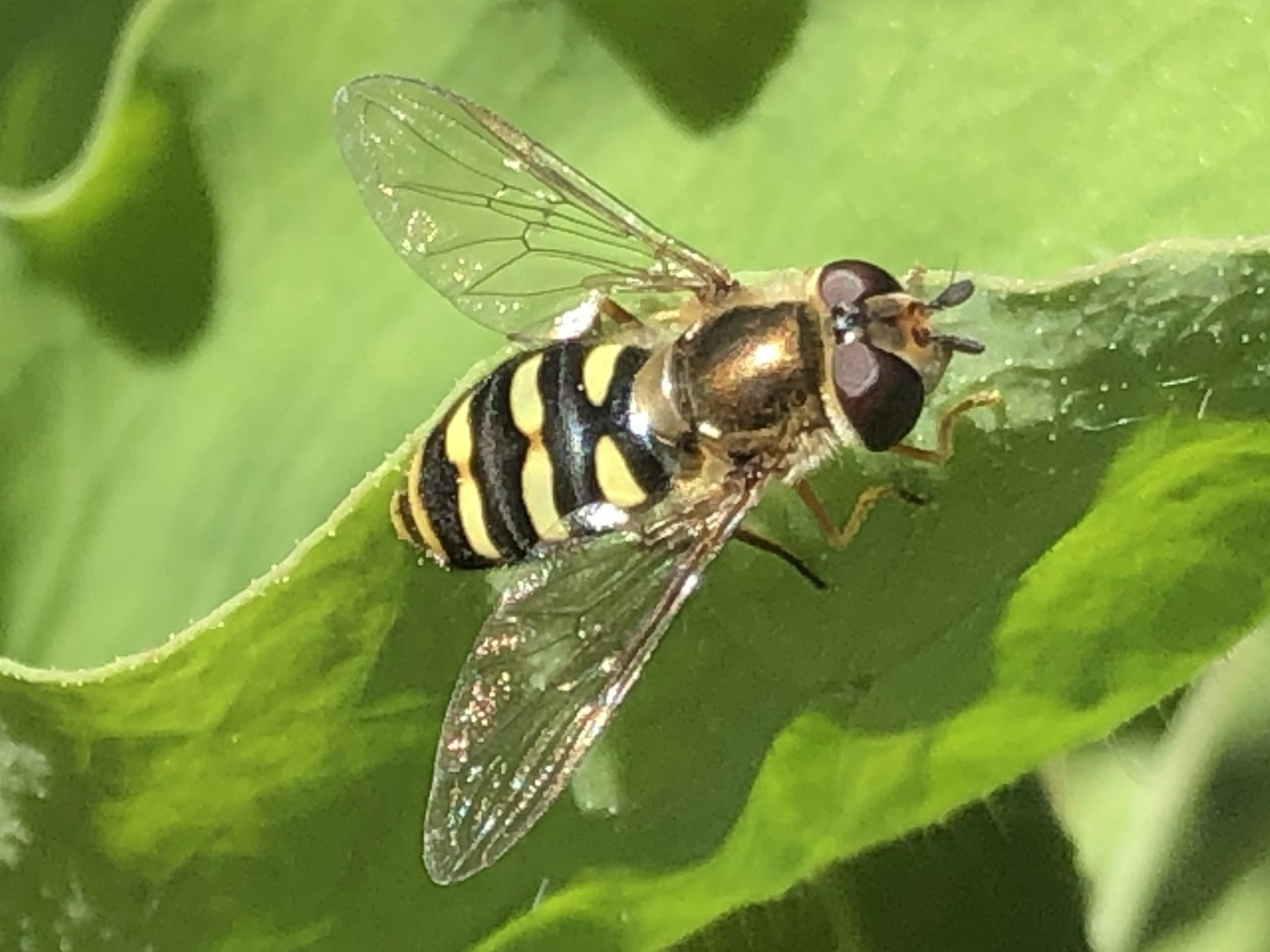

Scientific classification
- Kingdom: Animalia
- Phylum: Arthropoda
- Clade: Pancrustacea
- Class: Insecta
- Order: Diptera
- Family: Syrphidae
- Genus: Eupeodes
- Species: E. fumipennis

Binomial name
- Eupeodes fumipennis (Thomson, 1869)

Synonyms
- Syrphus fumipennis Thomson, 1869; Syrphus venablesi Curran, 1929

= Eupeodes fumipennis =

Species of fly

Eupeodes fumipennis, the western aphideater, is a species of hover fly in the family Syrphidae. As the common name implies, larvae prey on plant-sucking insects, primarily aphids.

Like other members of the family, adults often hover over the plants they visit.

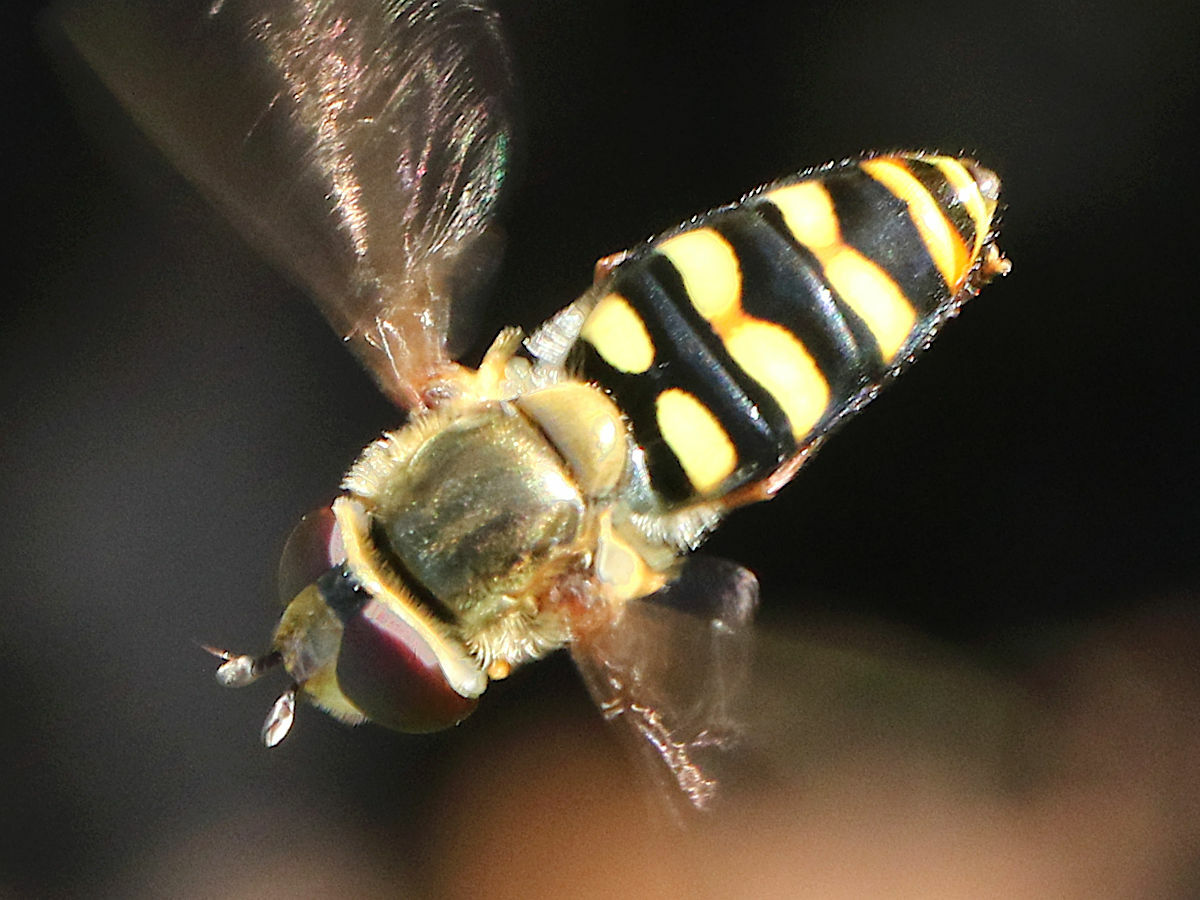
Female hovering
