= Hover (behaviour) =

Ability of some flying animals

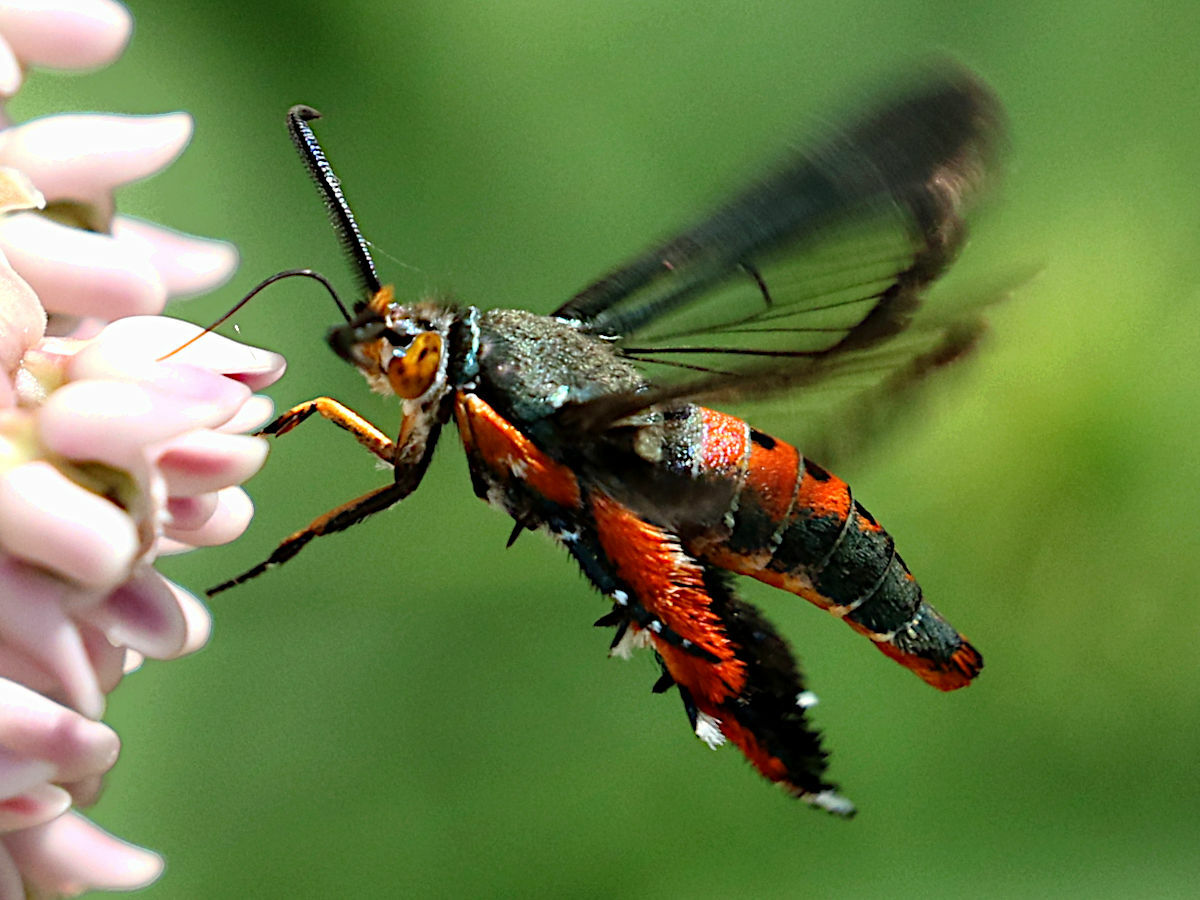
Squash vine borer hovering

Hovering is the ability exhibited by some winged animals to remain relatively stationary in midair. Usually this involves rapid downward thrusts of the wings to generate upward lift. Sometimes hovering is maintained by flapping or soaring into a headwind; this form of hovering is called "wind hovering", "windhovering", or "kiting".

== True hoverers ==
=== Hummingbirds ===
Hummingbirds hover over flowers to obtain nectar, flapping their wings at up to 70 beats per second.

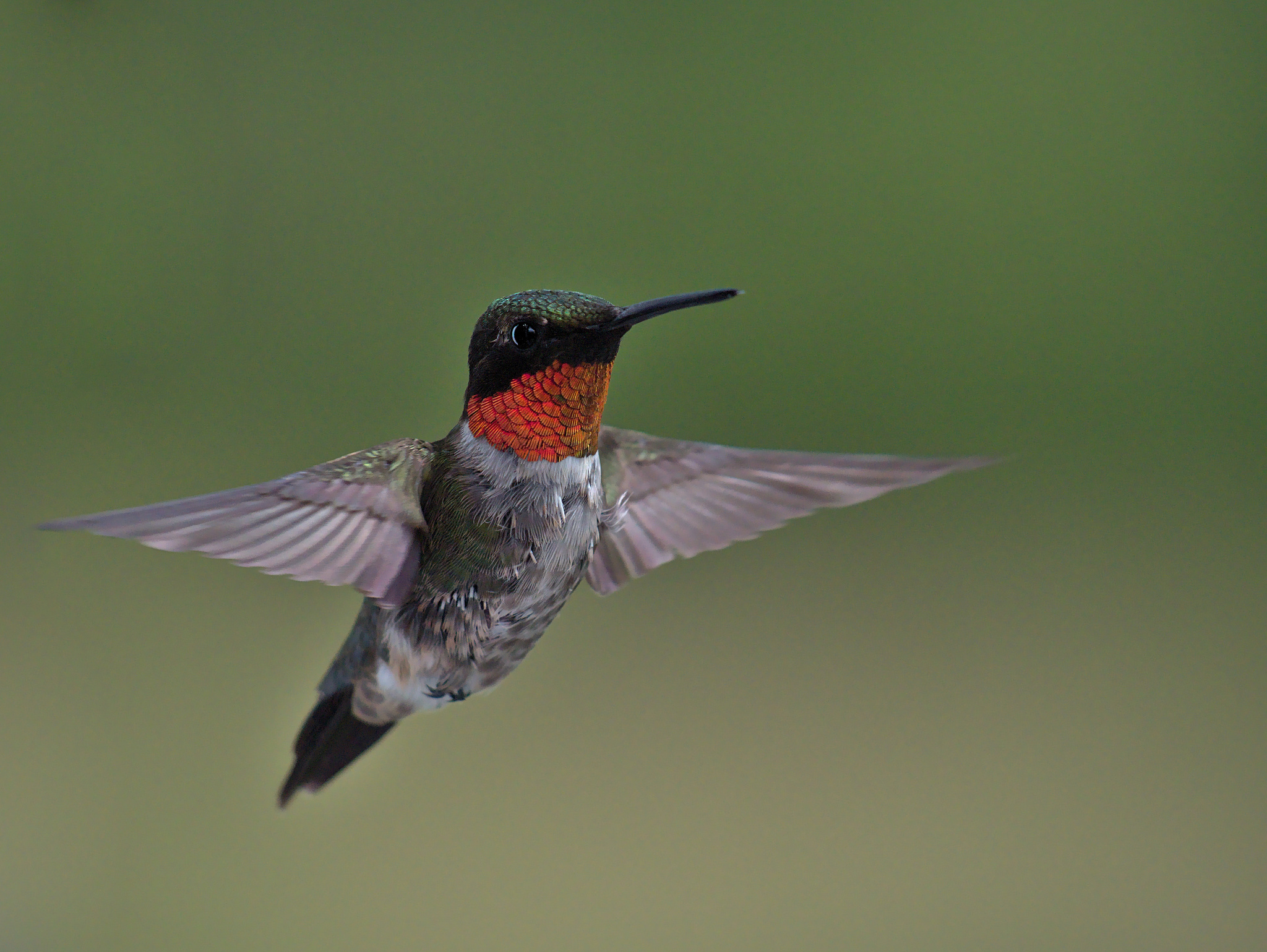
Ruby-throated hummingbird

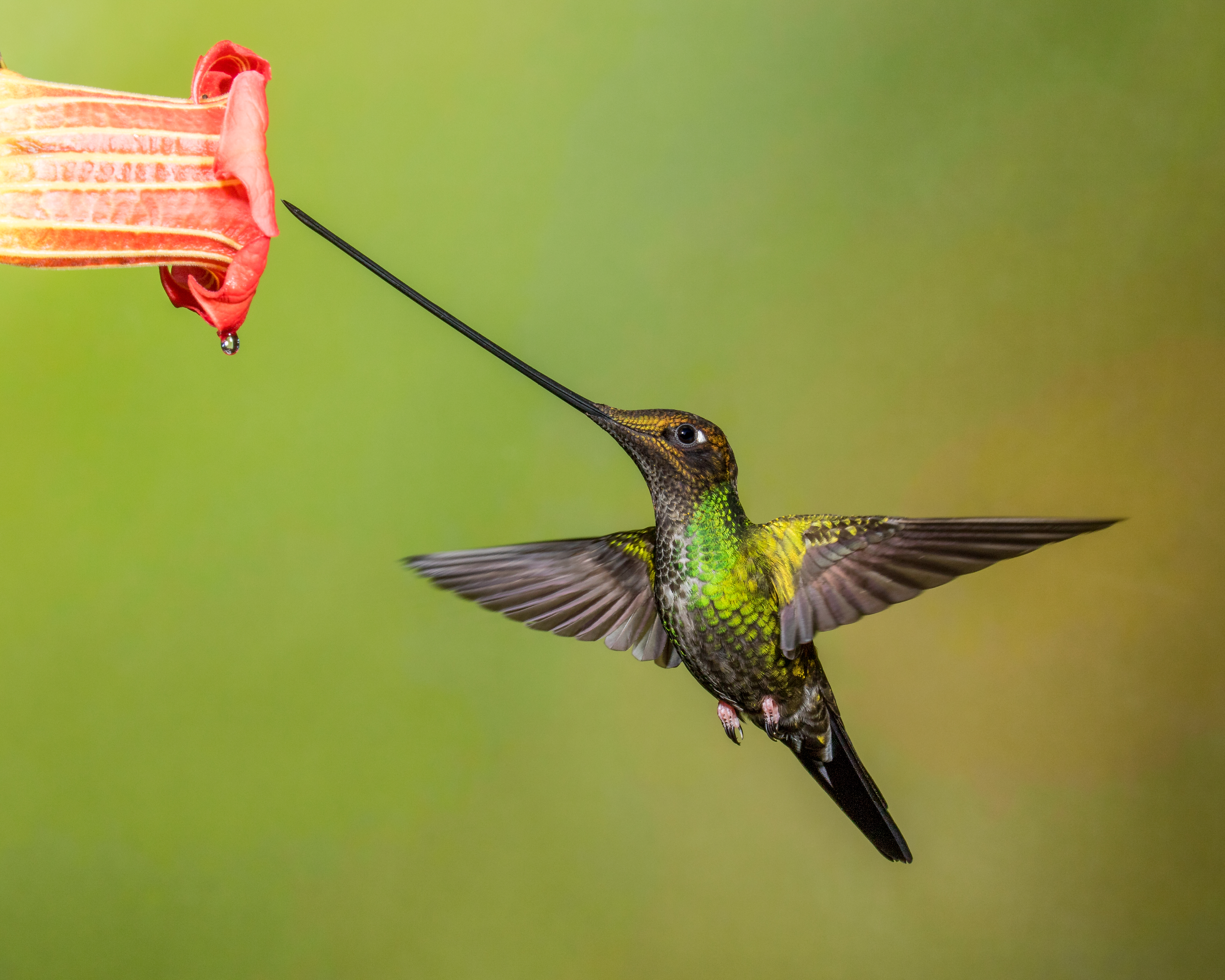
Sword-billed hummingbird

=== Bats ===
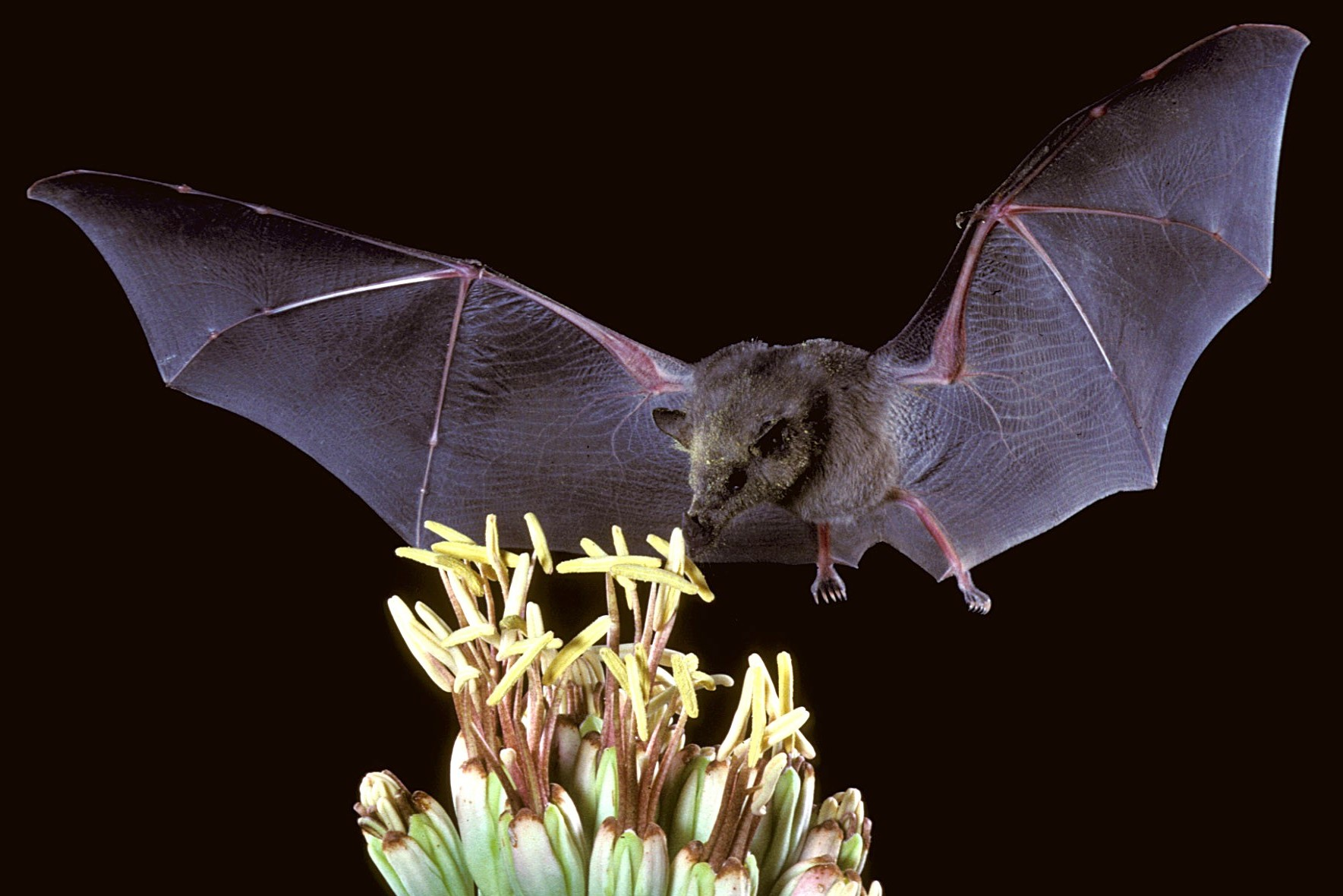
Mexican long-tongued bat

Like hummingbirds, fruit bats and nectar bats hover over flowers while feeding on fruits or nectar. Comparison between bats and hummingbirds has revealed that these animals exert similar amounts of energy relative to body weight during hovering: hummingbirds can twist their wings more easily and are more aerodynamic, but bats have bigger wings and larger strokes.

=== Kingfishers ===
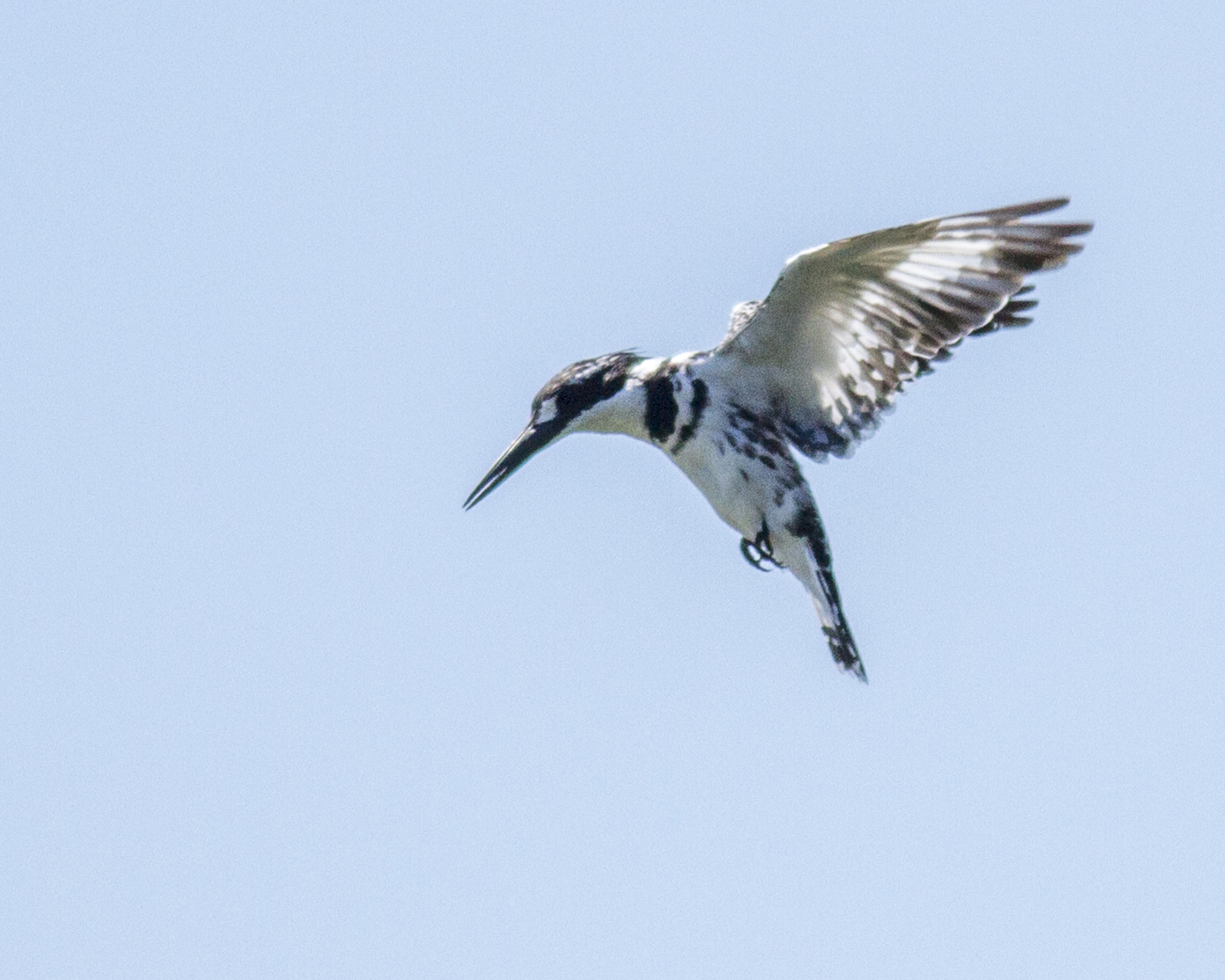
Pied kingfisher

Small Kingfishers such as Belted kingfisher may hover over water before diving in to catch fish. Larger species such as Ringed kingfisher are too heavy to hover for more than a few seconds.

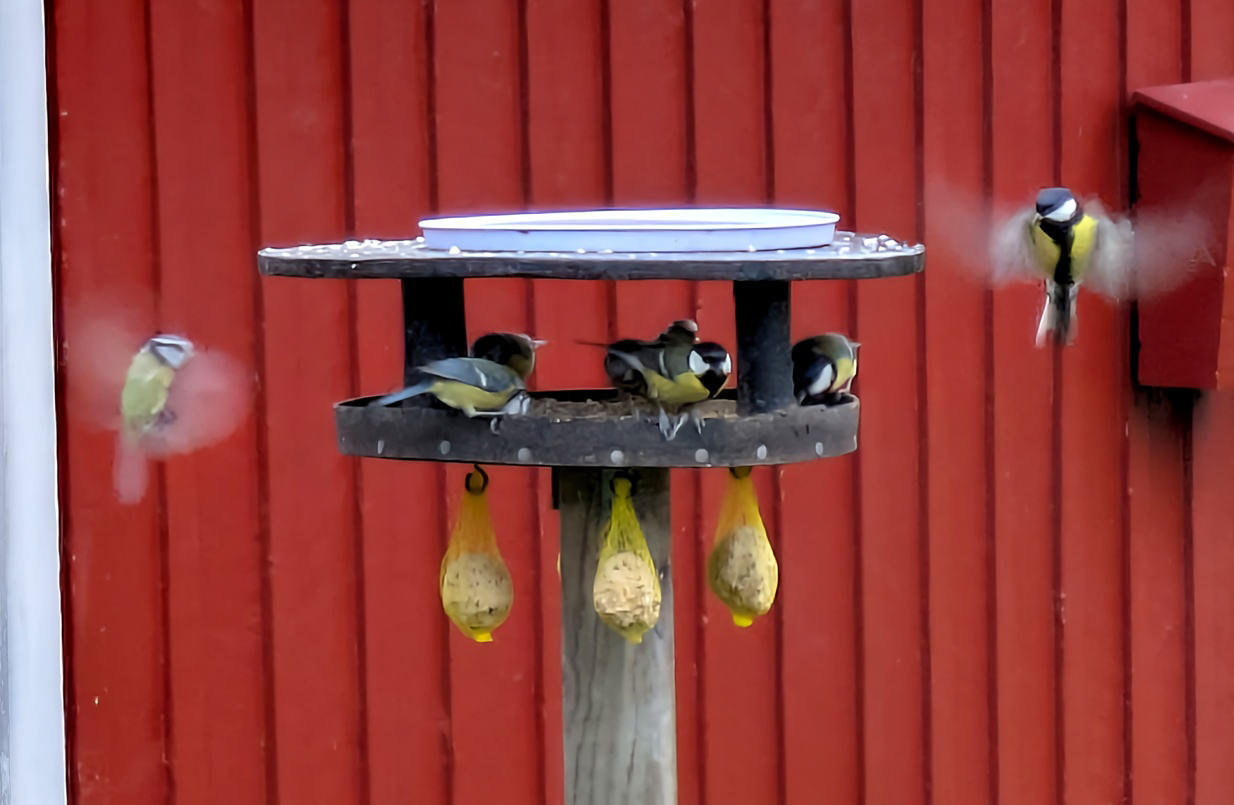
Many passerines can hover, the picture shows a Blue Tit and a Great Tit hovering and looking for a place to enter a bird feeder.

=== Moths ===
==== Sphinx moths ====
Some sphinx moths (family Sphingidae) are known as hummingbird moths for their ability to hover over flowers while nectaring. Moths are relatively heavy insects and sometimes hang on to the flower with their forelegs as they hover.

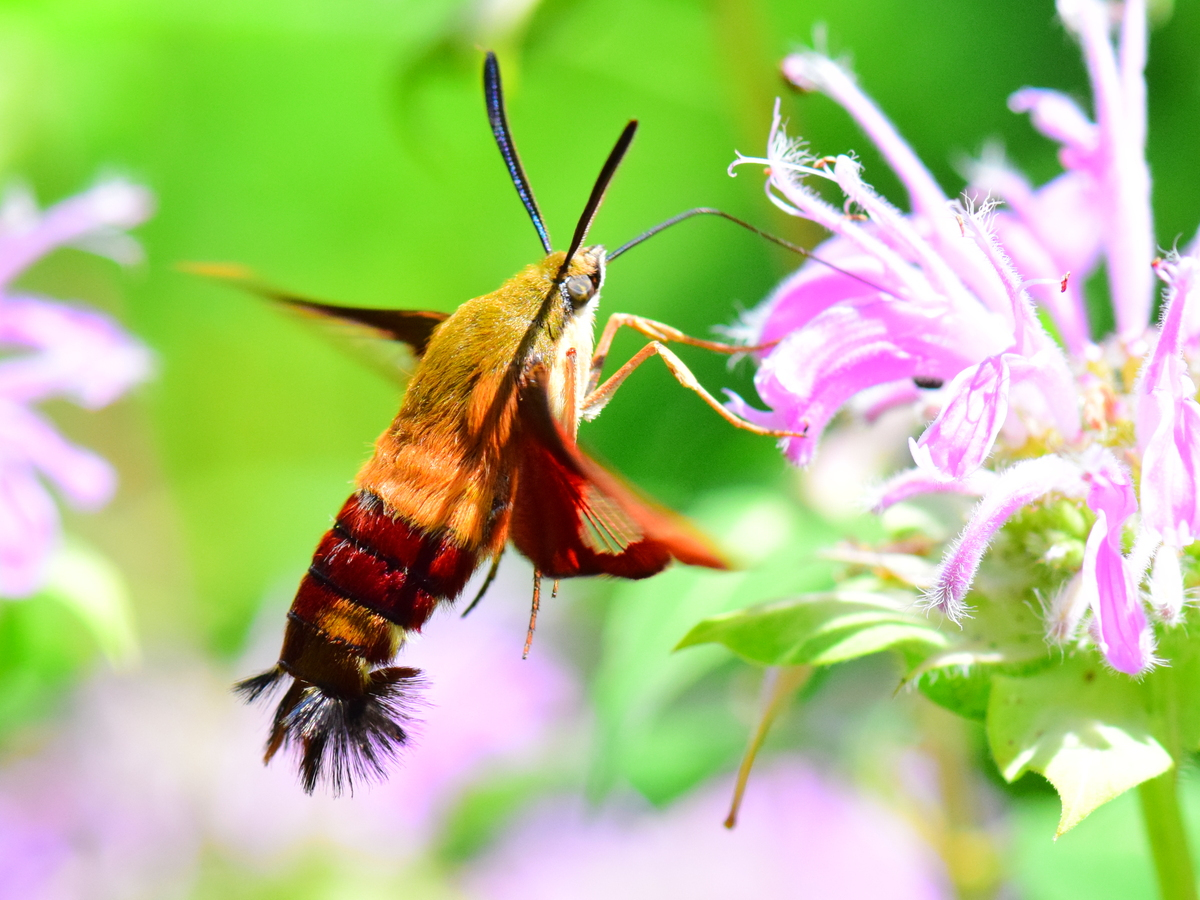
Hummingbird clearwing

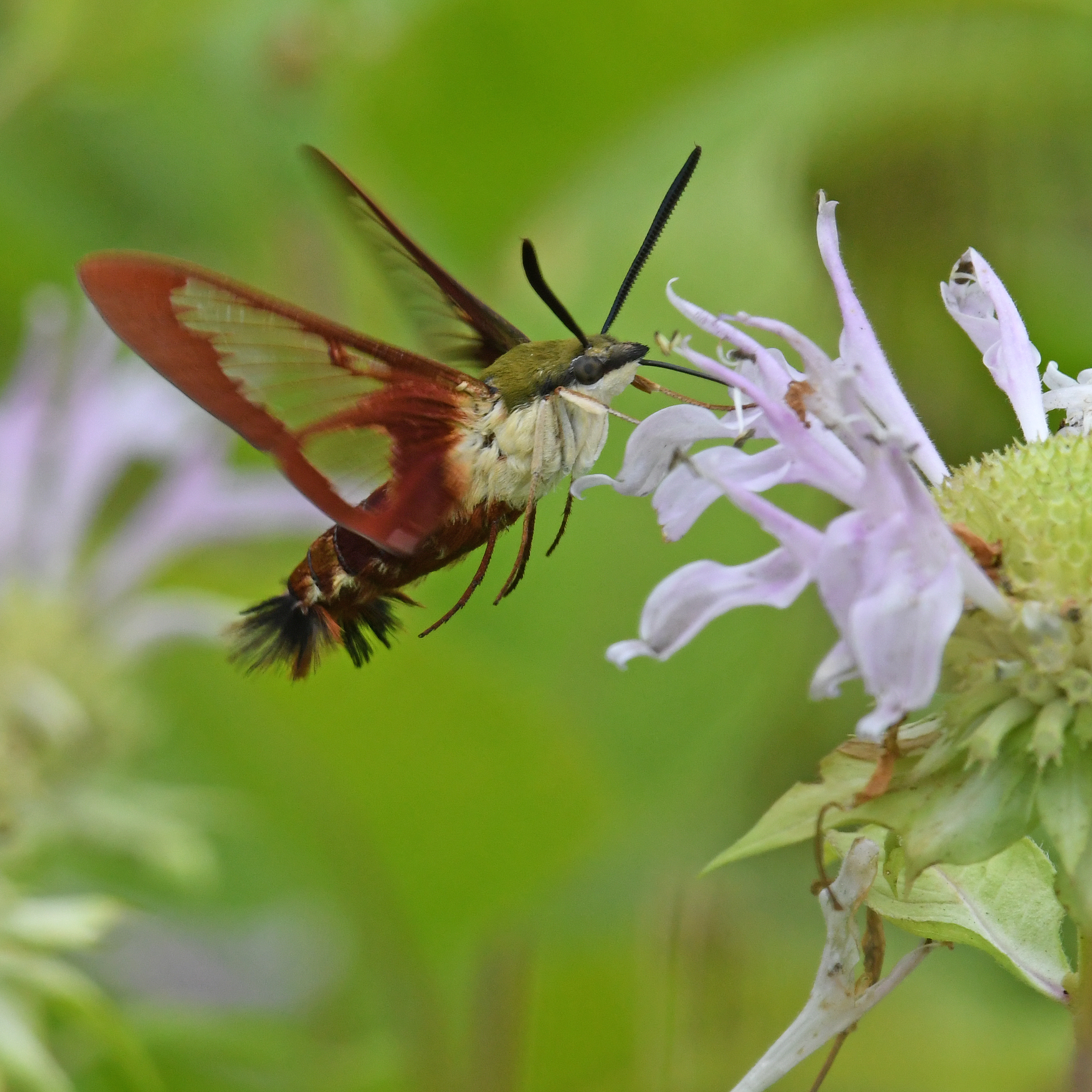
Broad-bordered bee hawk-moth

==== Clearwing moths ====
Some clearwing moths (family Sesiidae) also hover while nectaring or puddling. Females may also hover to inspect ovipositing sites.

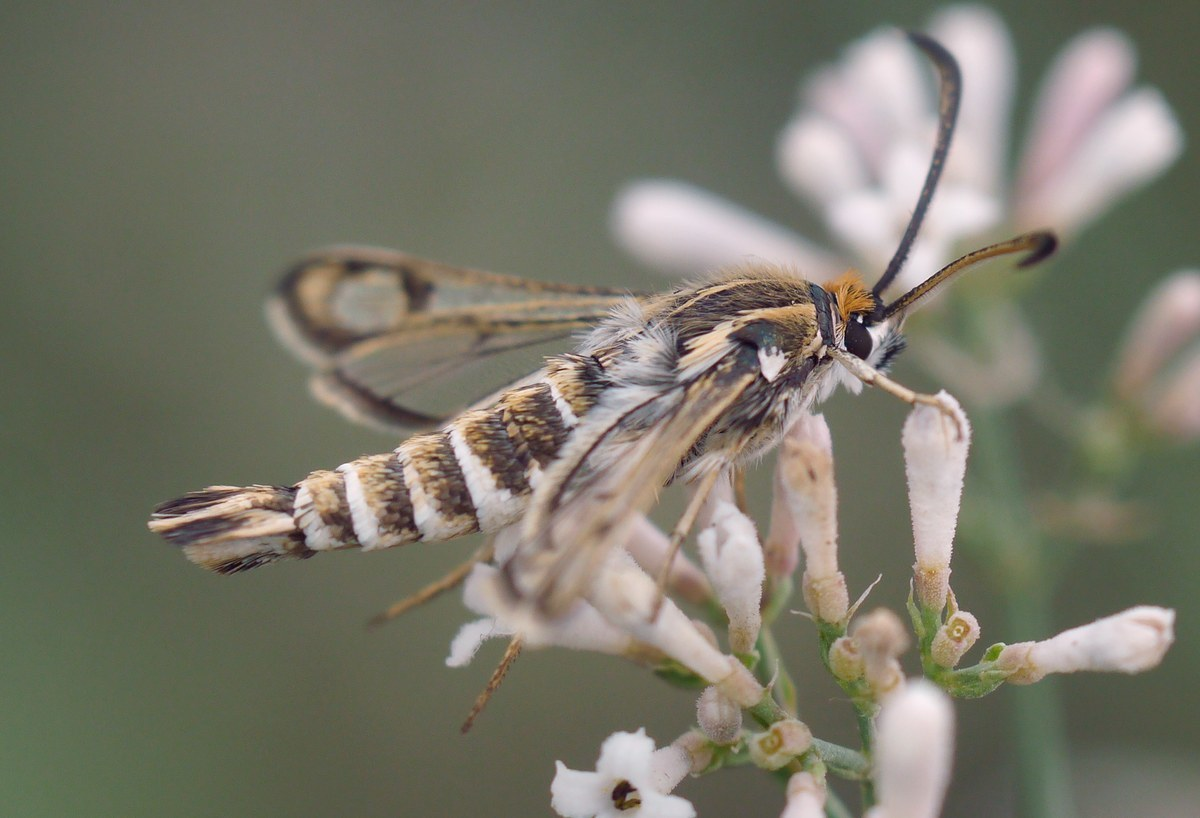
Chamaesphecia bibioniformis

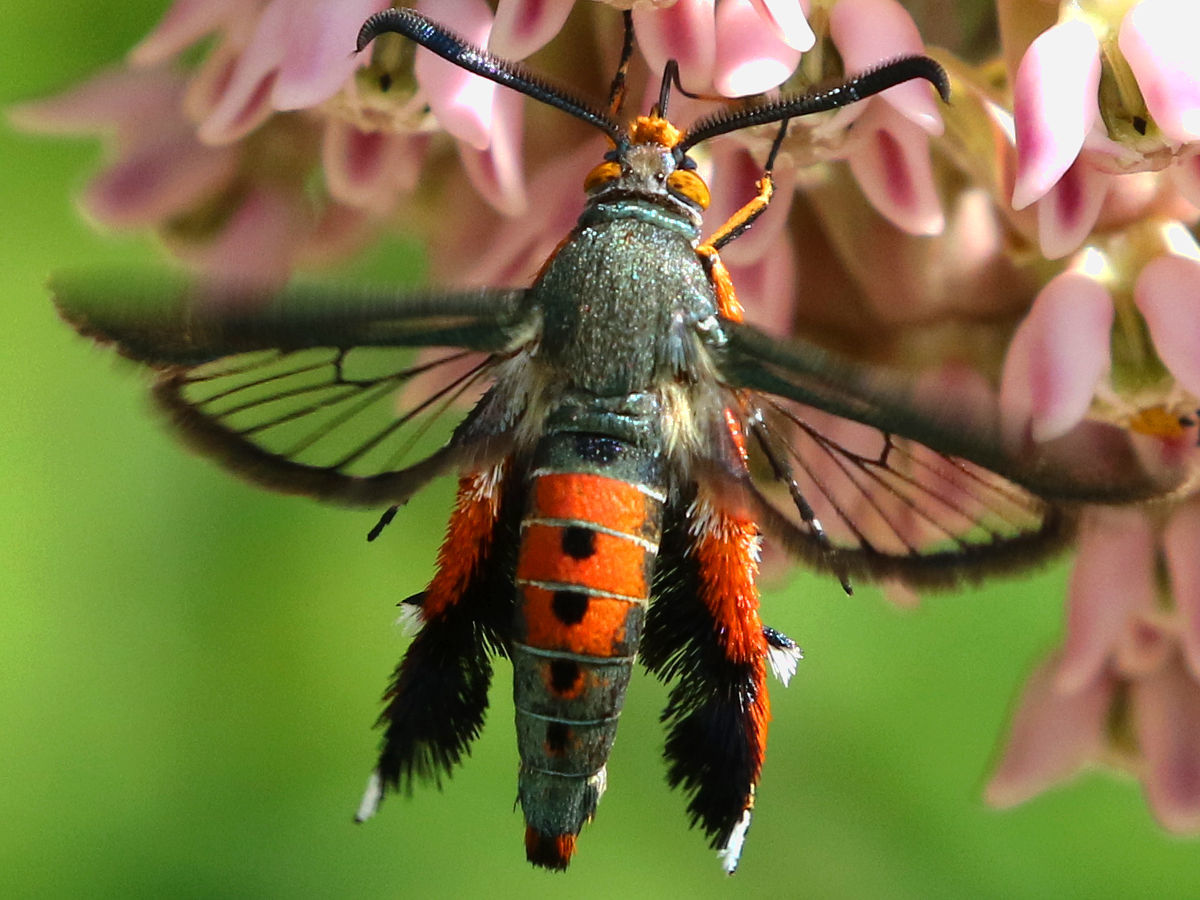
Squash vine borer

Hemaris diffinis is an excellent bumblebee mimic

=== Hoverflies ===
Hoverflies are flies that often hover over the plants they visit. This hovering behaviour is unlike that of hummingbirds since they do not feed in midair. Hovering in general may be a means of finding a food source; in addition, male hovering is often a territorial display seeking females, while female hovering serves to inspect ovipositing sites.

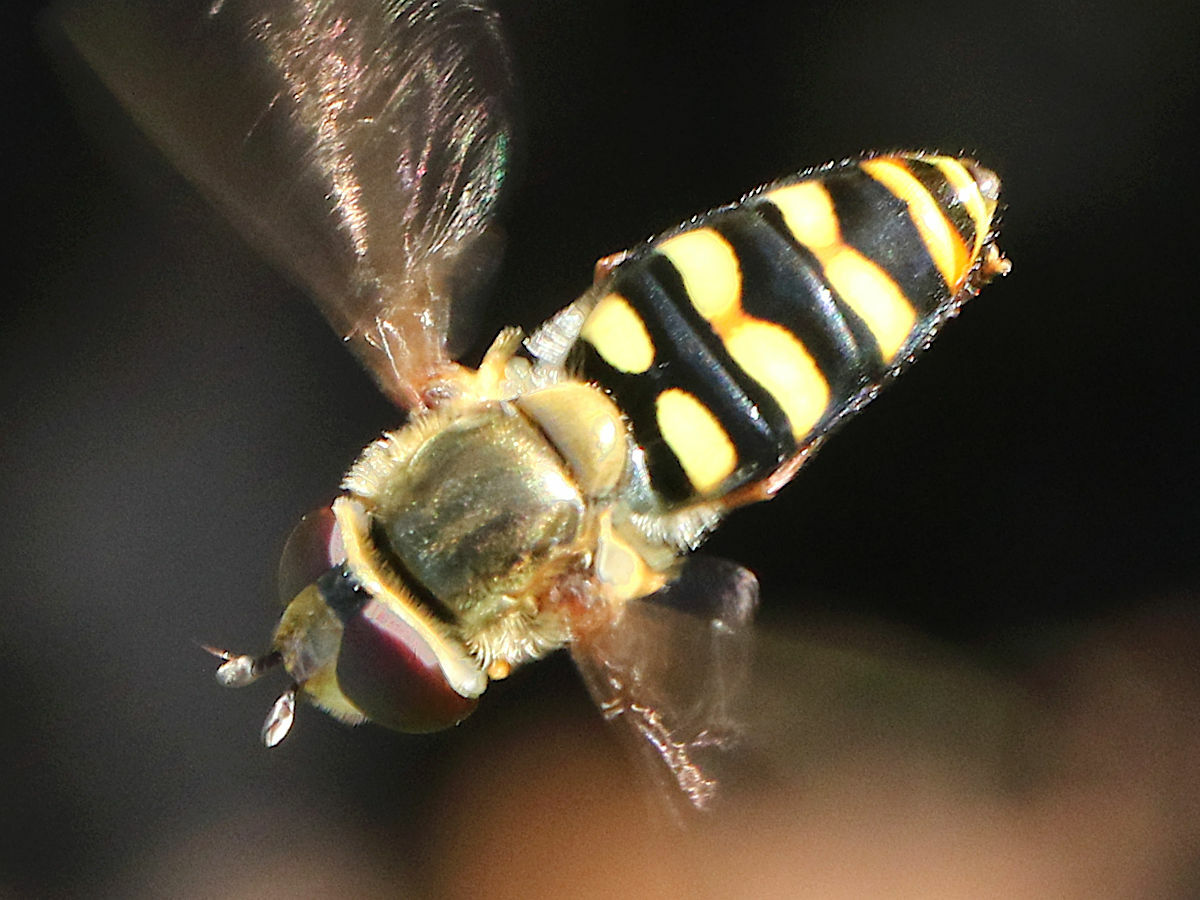
Western aphideater

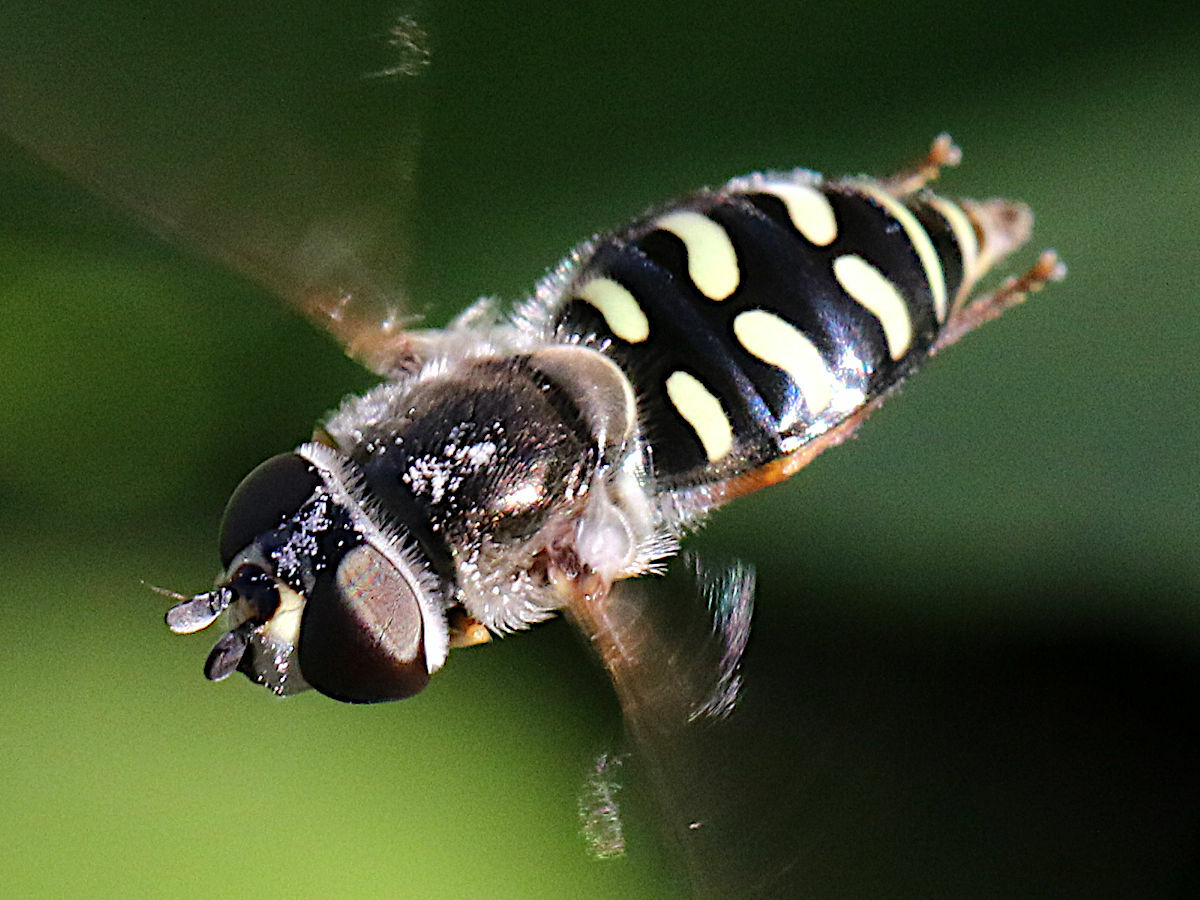
Large-tailed aphideater

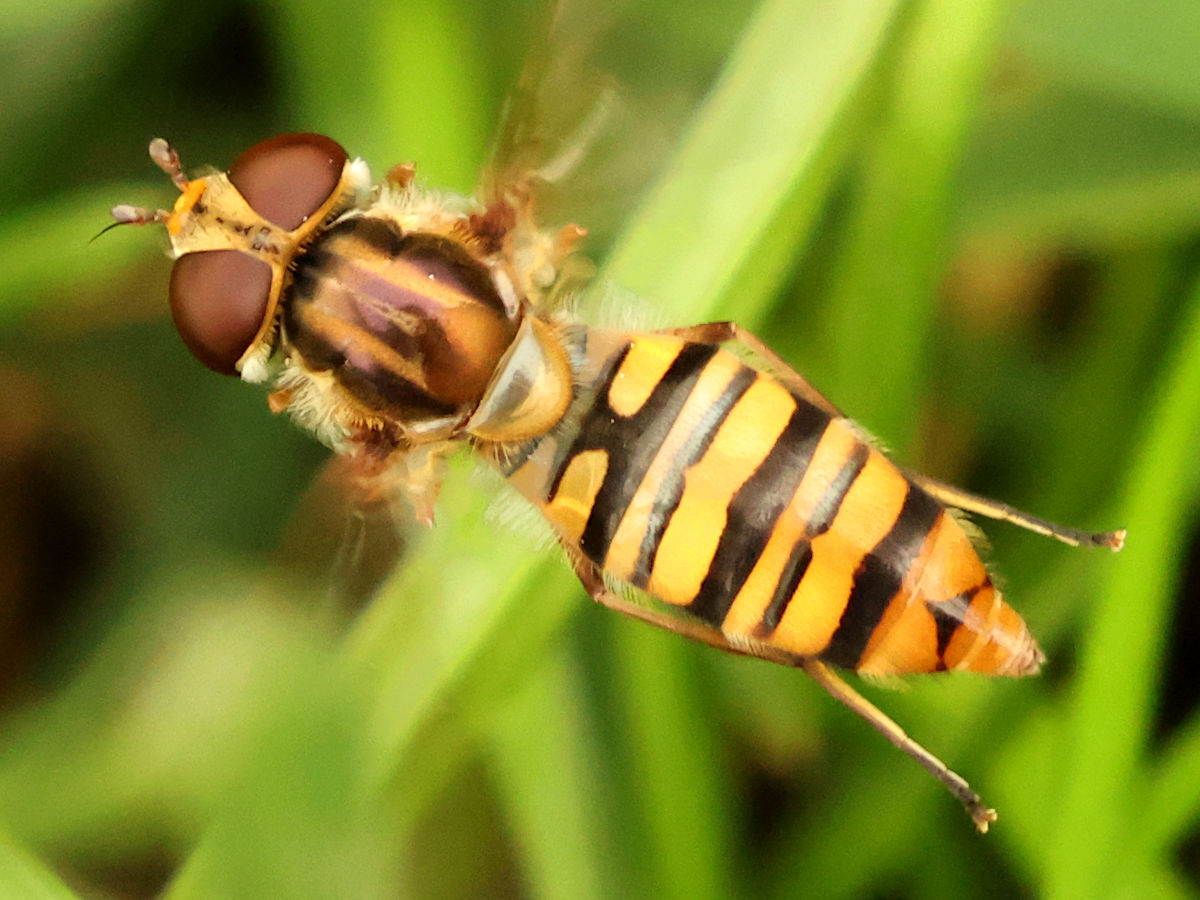
Marmalade hoverfly

=== Bee flies ===
Bee flies are parasitoids that can dart about in the air with great agility. Males hover as a courtship display, while females hover over ovipositing sites - usually the entrance of a host insect nest, and shoot eggs into the nest using an ejecting movement of their abdomen. Species that have a long proboscis can hover over flowers while feeding, much as hummingbirds do, though these flies may touch the flower with their legs for balance while hovering.

Bombylius egg ejection

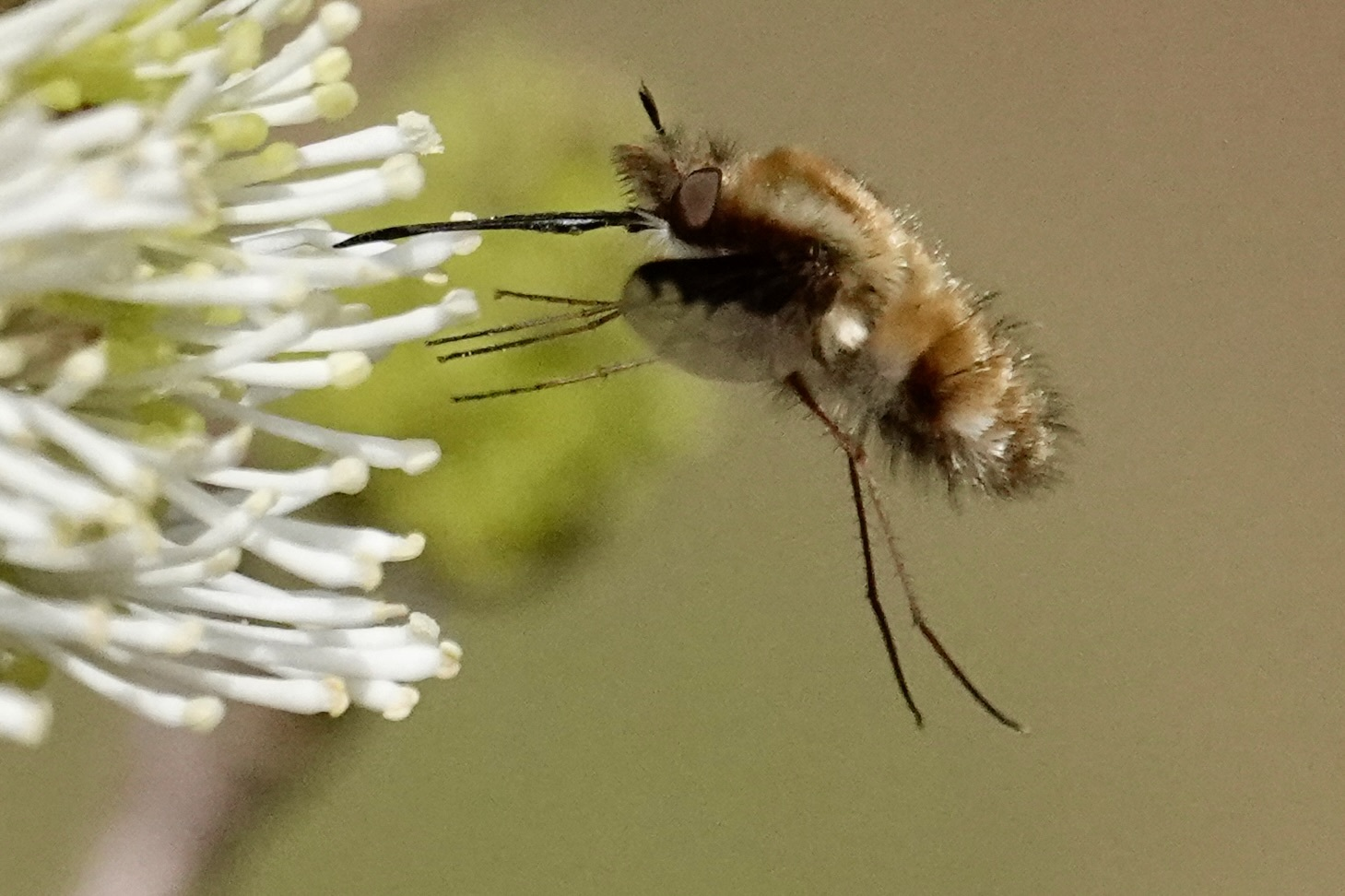
Large bee-fly

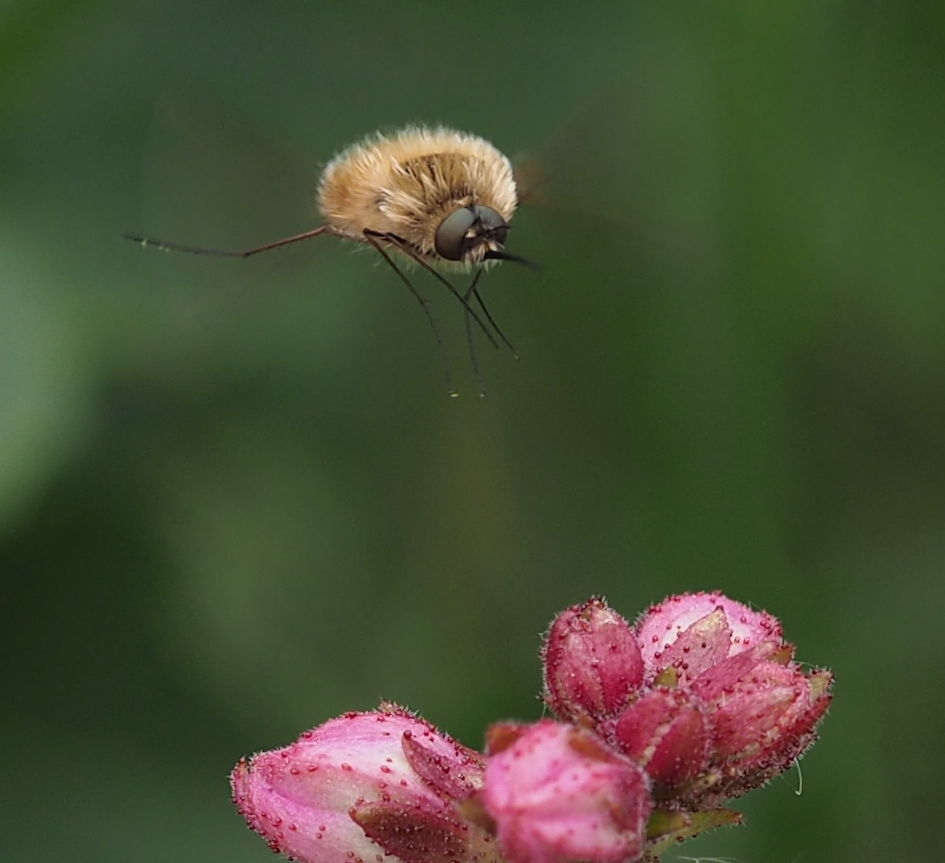
Western bee-fly

=== Odonata ===
Odonata is an insect order that includes dragonflies and damselflies. They are strong aviators renowned for their acrobatic flights, including the ability to hover, usually for a short pause during their ceaseless territorial patrols.

==== Dragonflies ====
In addition to short hovers while cruising, female dragonflies may hover over the water before or during oviposition, males may also hover-guard their mate at this time.

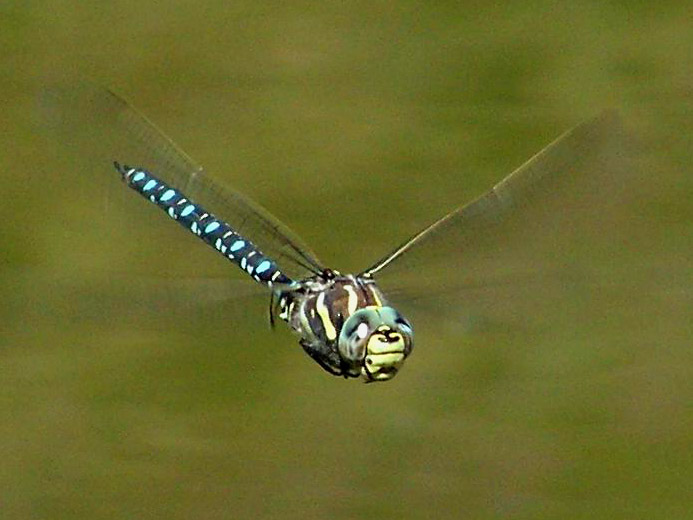
Sedge darner male

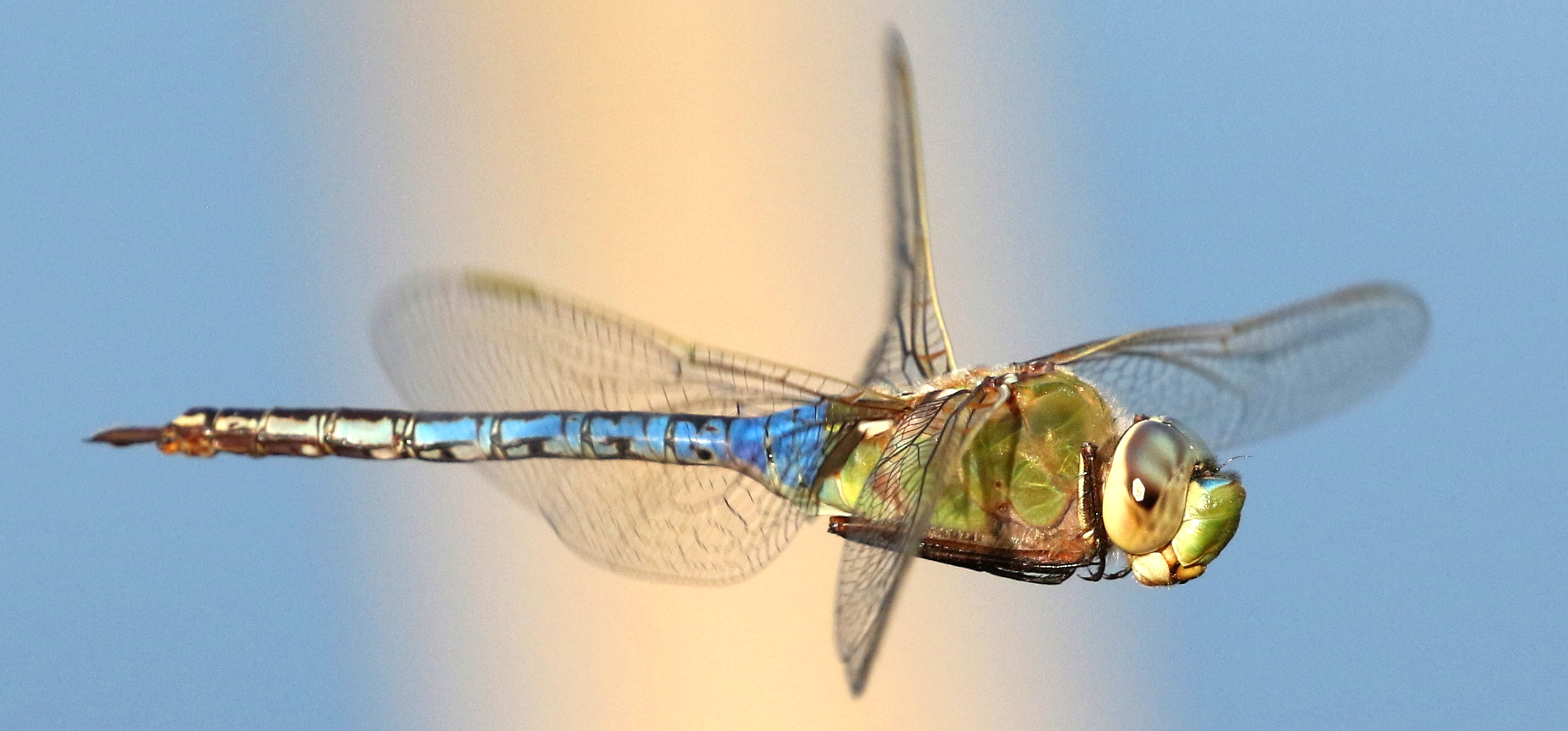
Green darner male

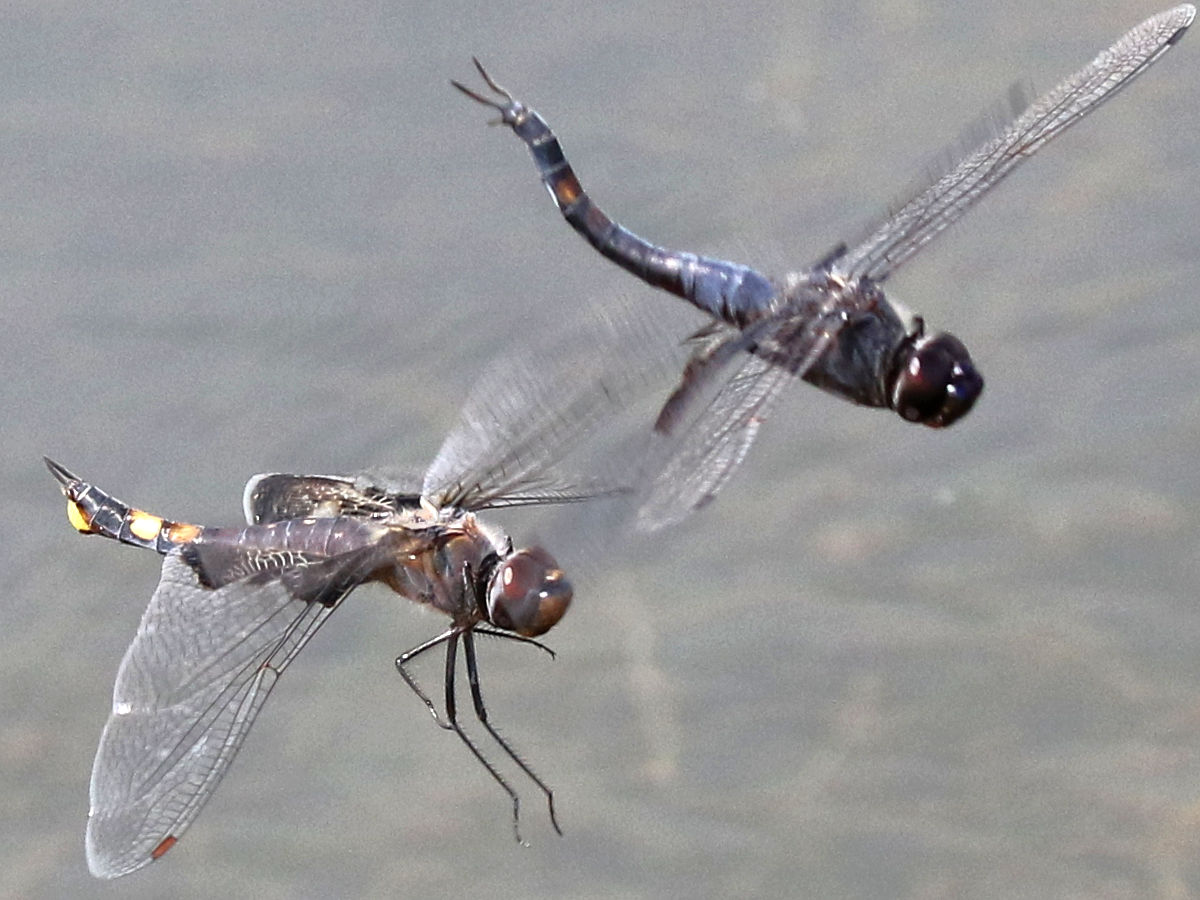
Black saddlebags pair hovering over oviposition site
female dragonflies hover-ovipositing

Blue dasher

Common whitetail

==== Damselflies ====
Some male damselflies hover in front of females or over the oviposition site during courtship; sometimes females also hover in response. After mating, males may hover-guard their mate by either circling over her or by hovering while attached to her in tandem. Males hover-guarding in tandem do not need wings at all to remain suspended in the air; they are held aloft by clasping their mate with their abdomen, and can maintain their position even when the head and thorax are removed by predators.

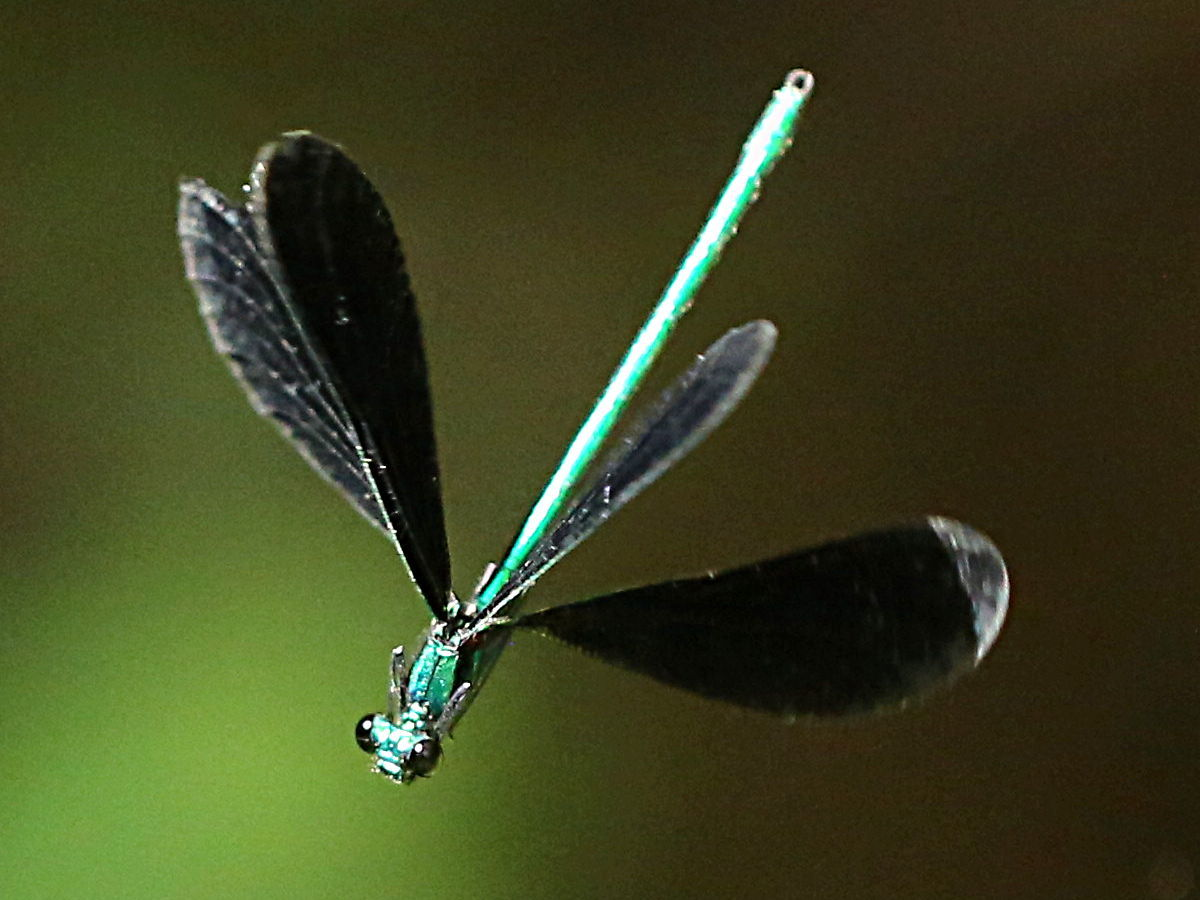
Ebony jewelwing male hover-patrolling

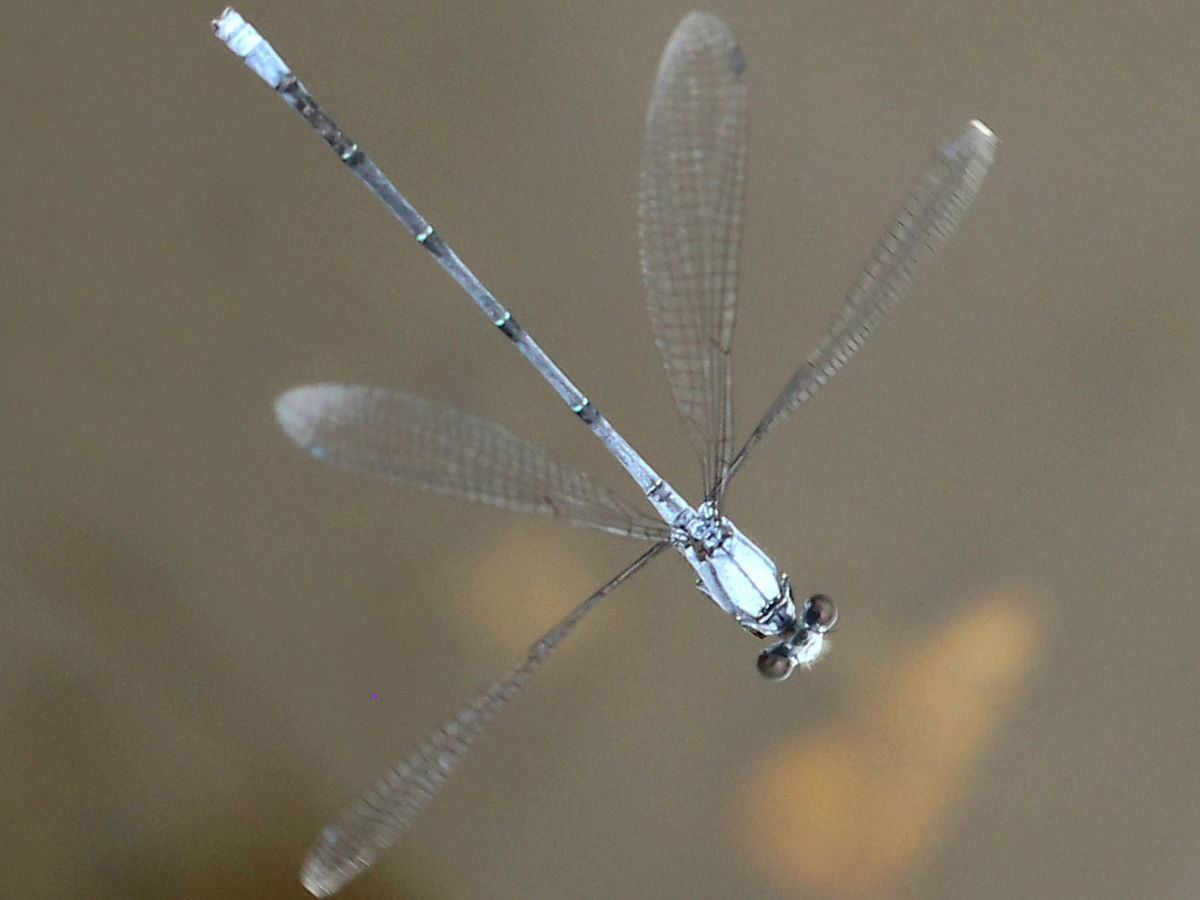
Powdered dancer male hover-patrolling

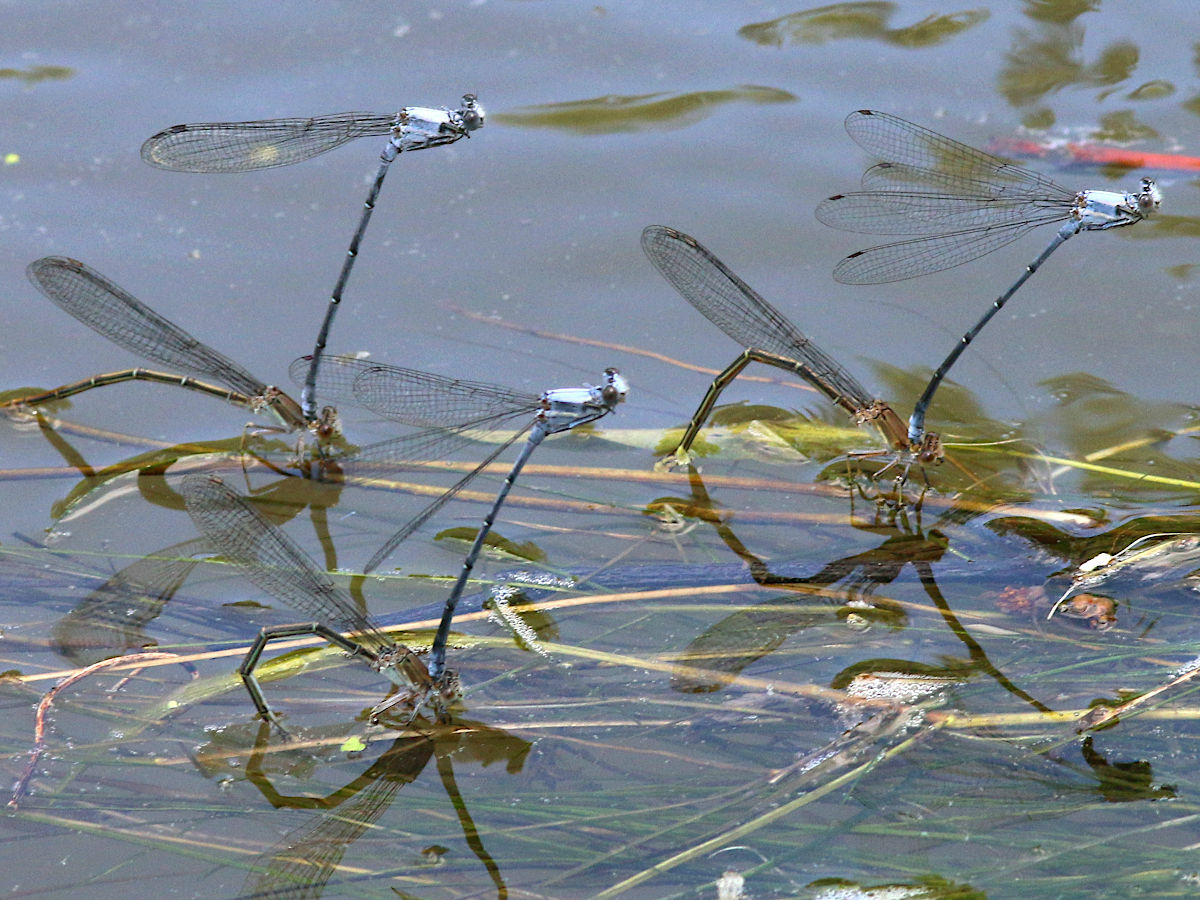
Powdered dancer males hover-guarding

=== Hymenoptera ===
==== Bees ====
Many bee species, such as bumblebees, hover momentarily as they approach flowers to feed. Males of some species, including carder bees, hover while patrolling their territories.

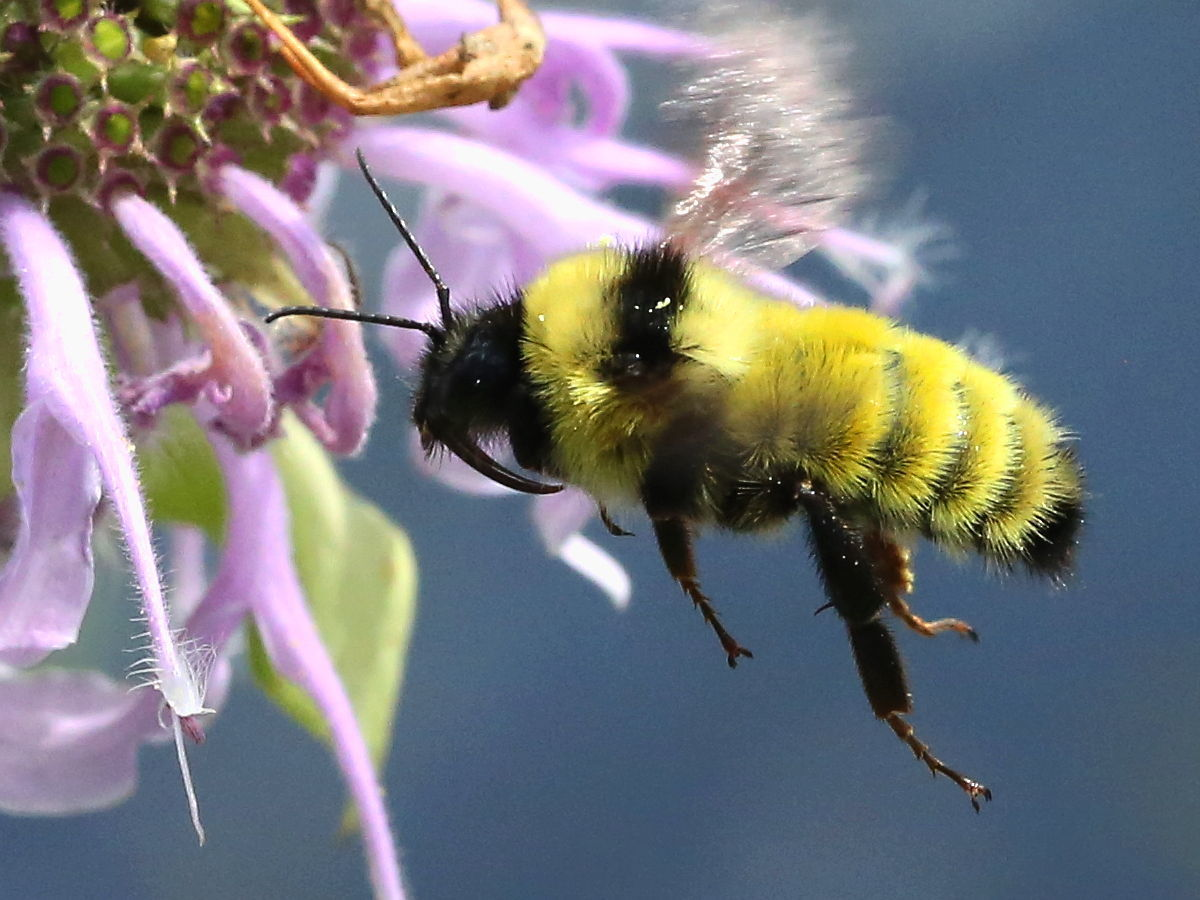
Golden northern bumble bee

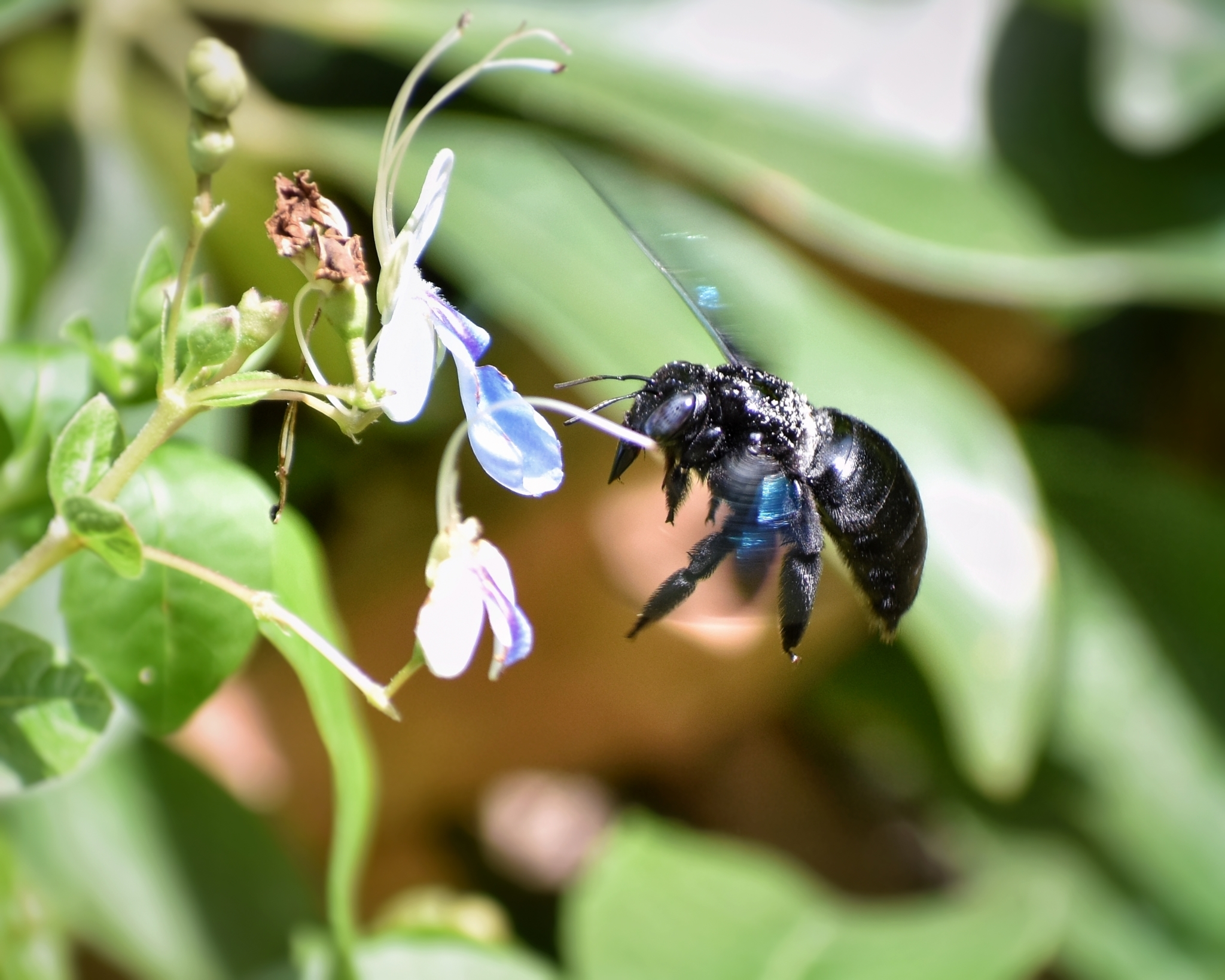
Oriental carpenter bee

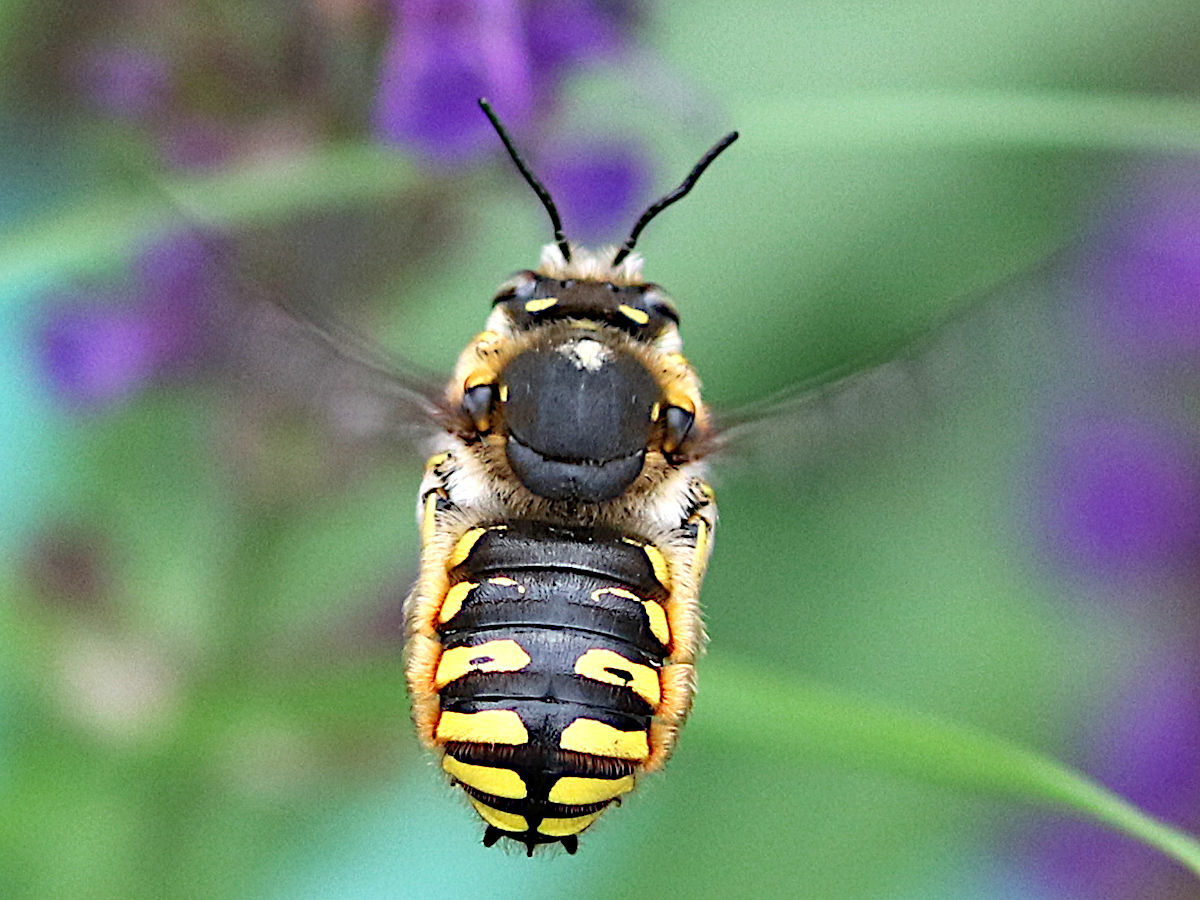
European wool carder bee

Large eyed male carpenter bees primarily hover to protect their territory and attract female carpenter bees. Hovering allows them to spot intruders and other male competitors. When a male carpenter bee encounters an intruder, including a person and other mammals, it may dart towards it to chase it away.

Large eyed male mountain carpenter bee hovering

==== Wasps ====
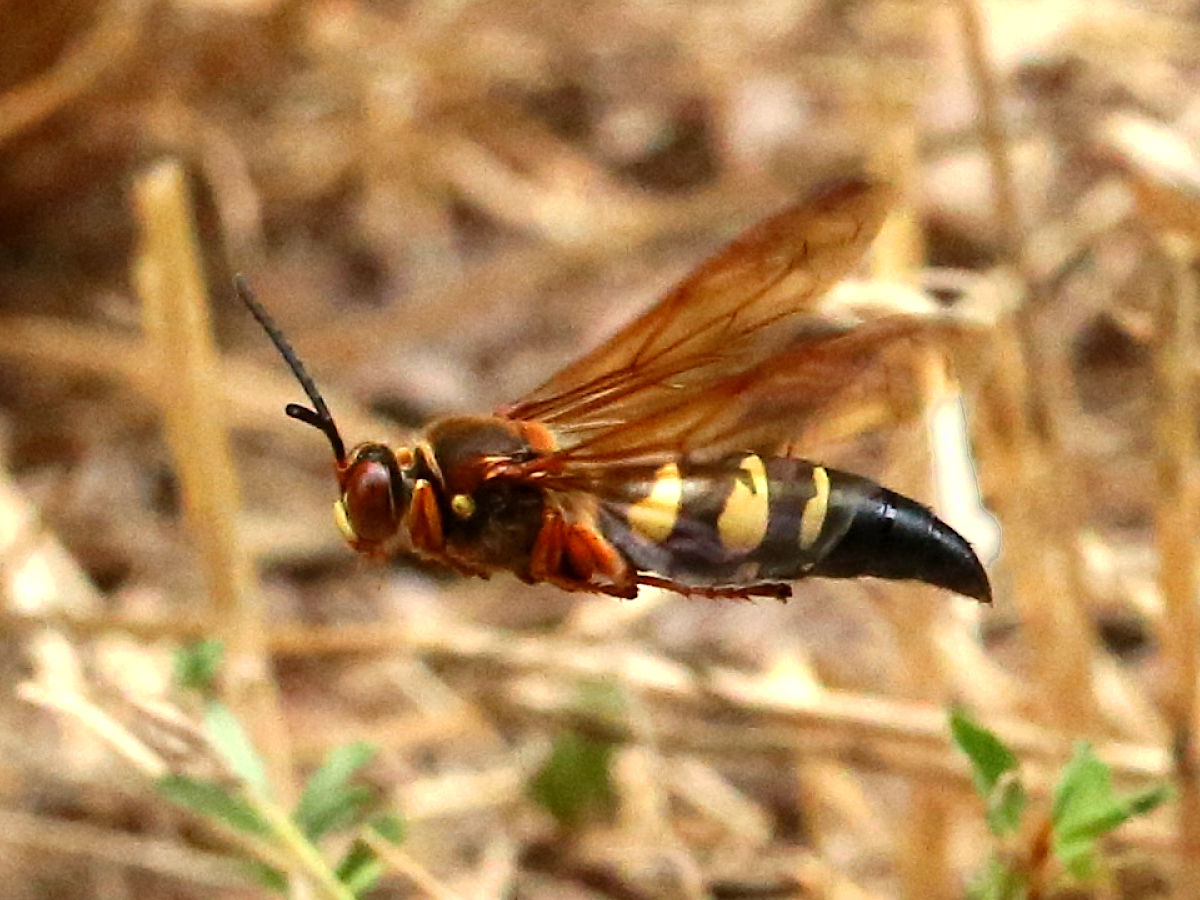
Eastern cicada killer

Among the social wasps, Stenogastrinae are known as hover wasps due to their distinctive hovering flight. Males often hover to display banding patterns on their abdomen as a territorial display.

Among the solitary wasps, parasitoid species such as scoliid wasps exhibit hovering behaviour while hunting for prey to feed their larvae. Males of some parasitoids may hover briefly while they patrol their territories, seeking females and chasing away rivals.

== Wind hoverers ==
=== Raptors ===
Many birds of prey such as kestrels, harriers, and members of the Buteo genus can "windhover" by facing the wind. Elanine kites also engage in "windhovering"; this behaviour is also called "kiting" due the common names of this genus.

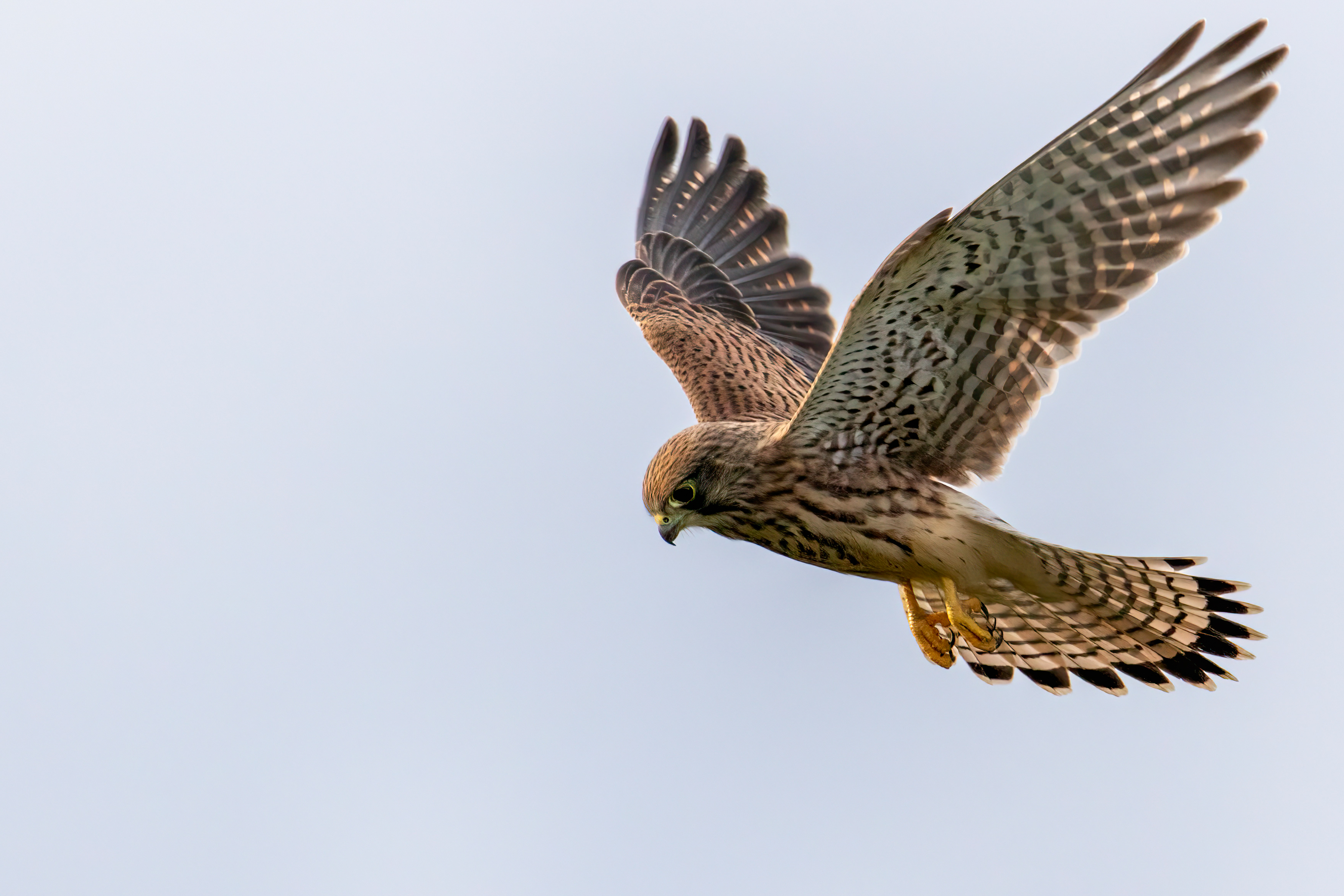
Common kestrel

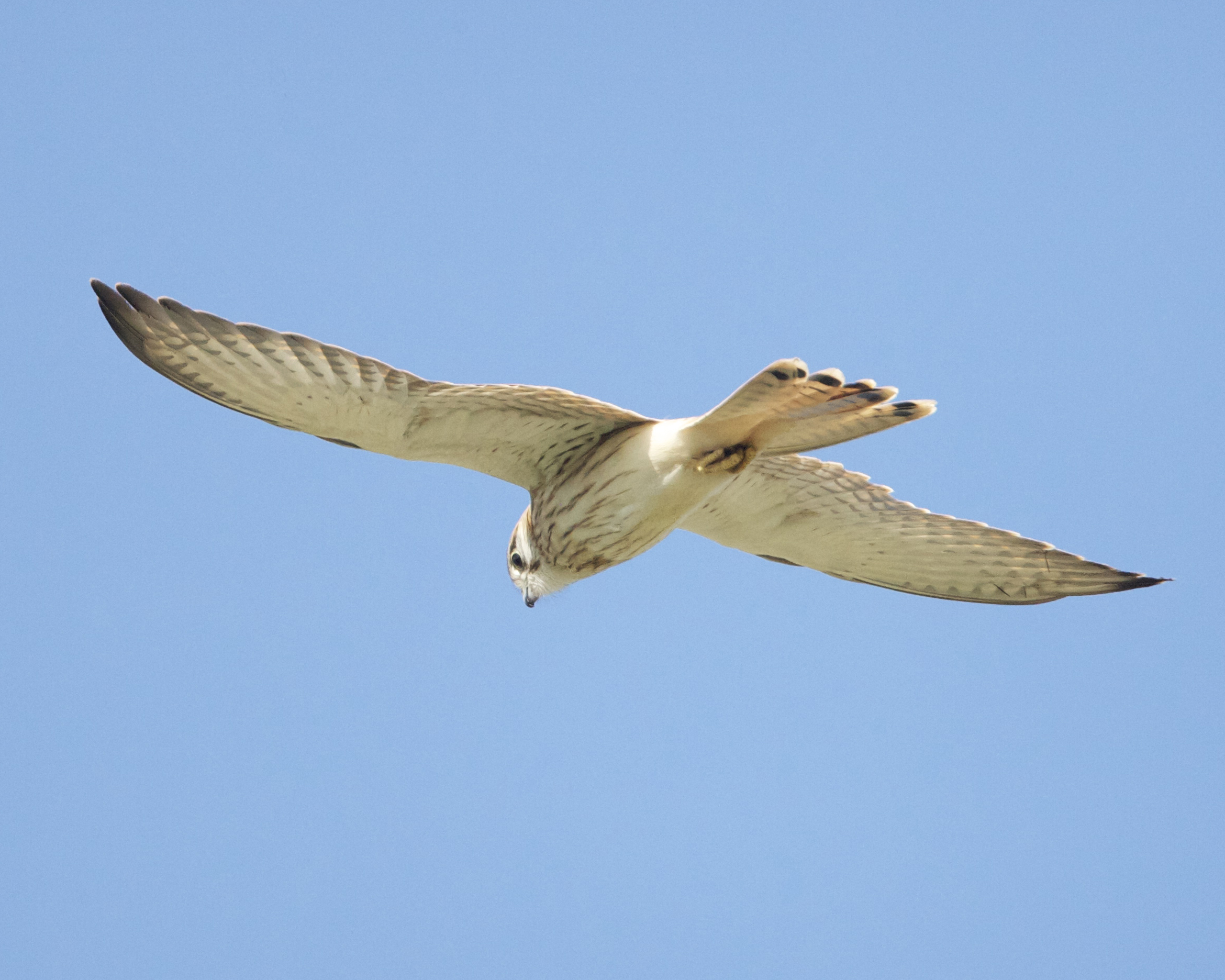
Nankeen kestrel

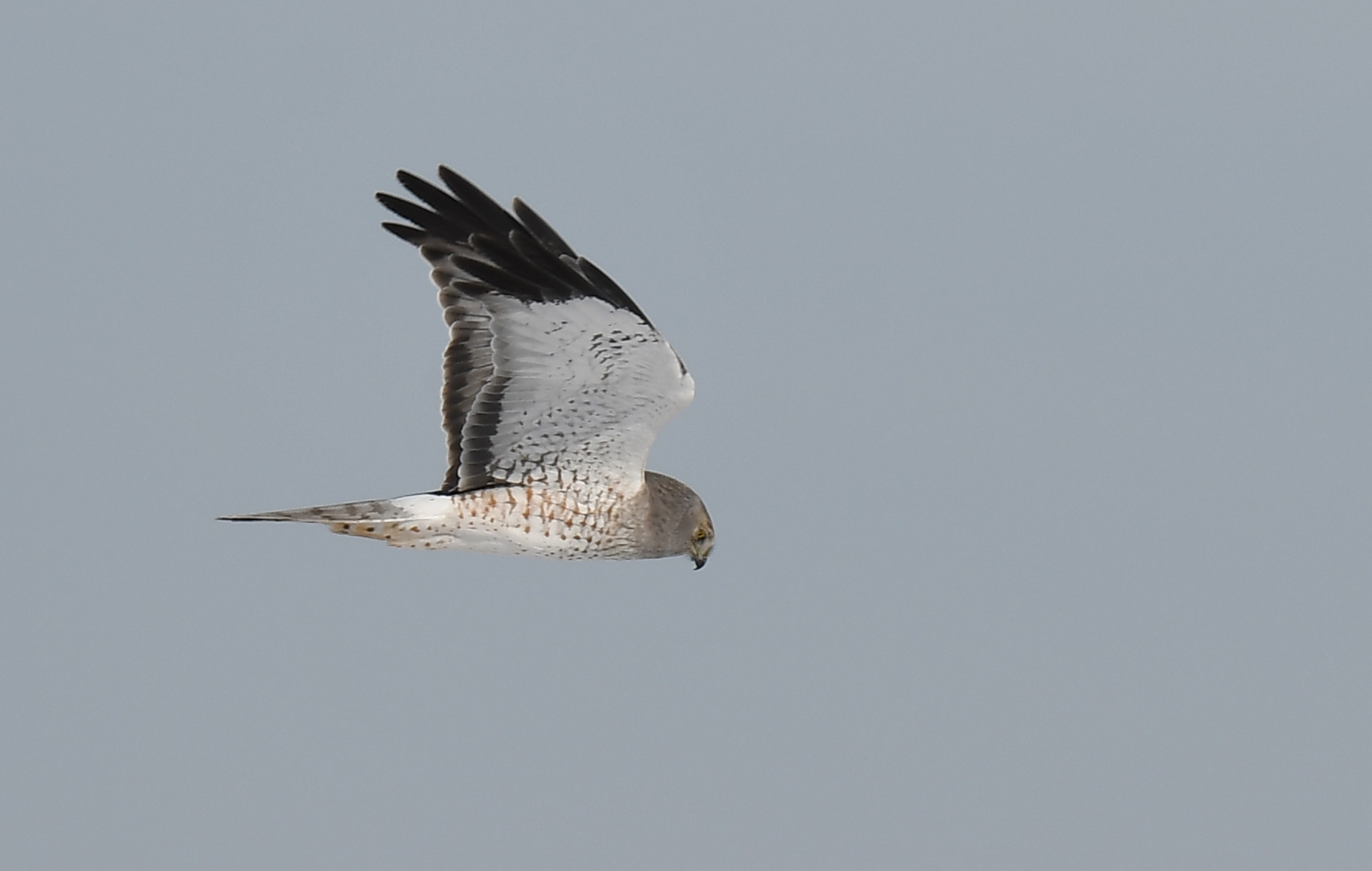
Northern harrier

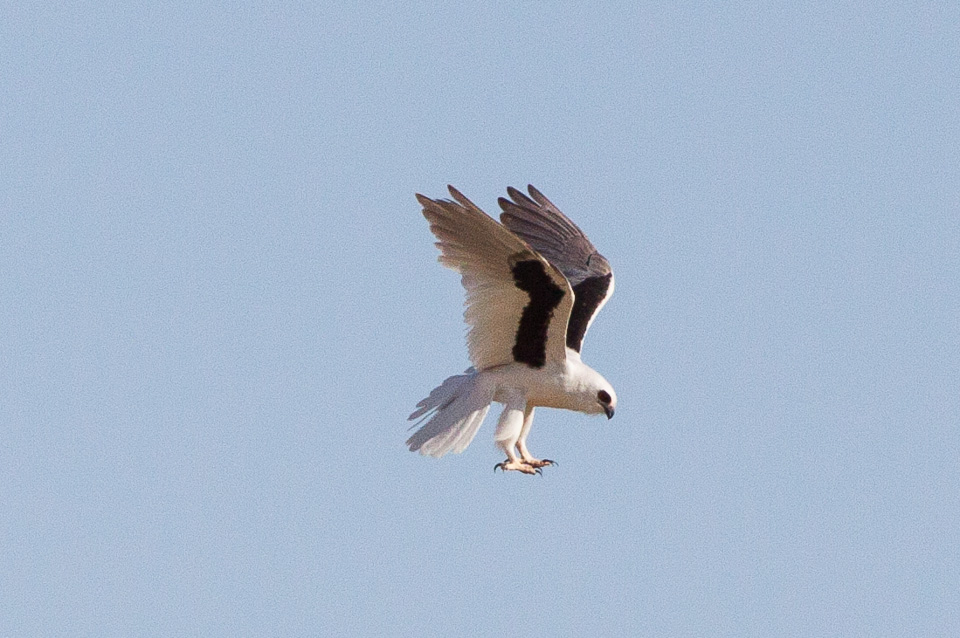
Letter-winged kite

=== Seabirds ===
Certain seabirds can windhover by soaring or flapping into the wind; often this behaviour takes advantage of thermals whipping off a coastal cliff.

Tropicbirds can even fly backwards against a strong headwind; Red-tailed tropicbird pairs use this ability to circle each other during courtship displays.

Smaller seabirds such as shearwaters and storm petrels feed by hovering low over the water surface, flapping with half-open wings and paddling with their feet in a technique called "pattering" or "sea-anchoring". The waves are accompanied by a slight horizontal wind that enables the birds to soar in place while using their feet to steady themselves.

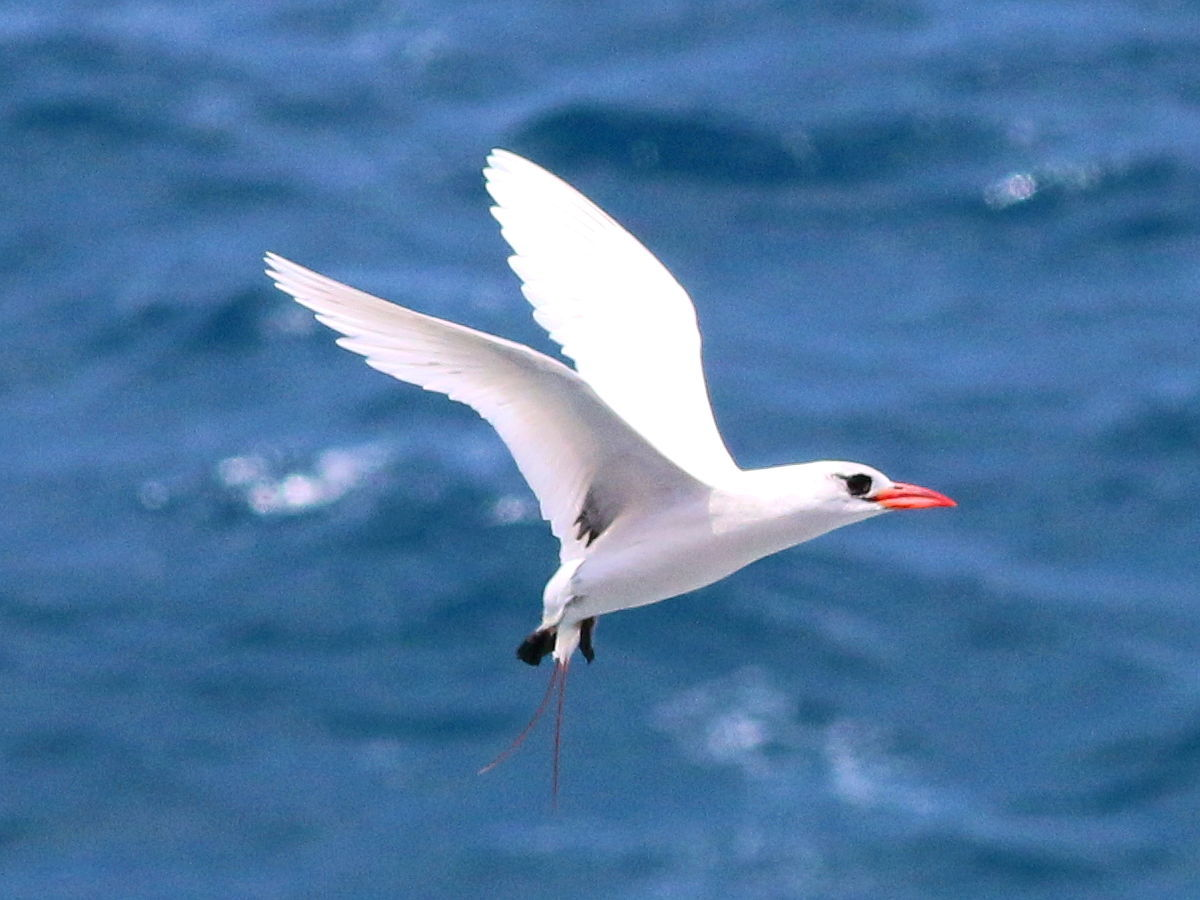
Red-tailed tropicbird flying backwards

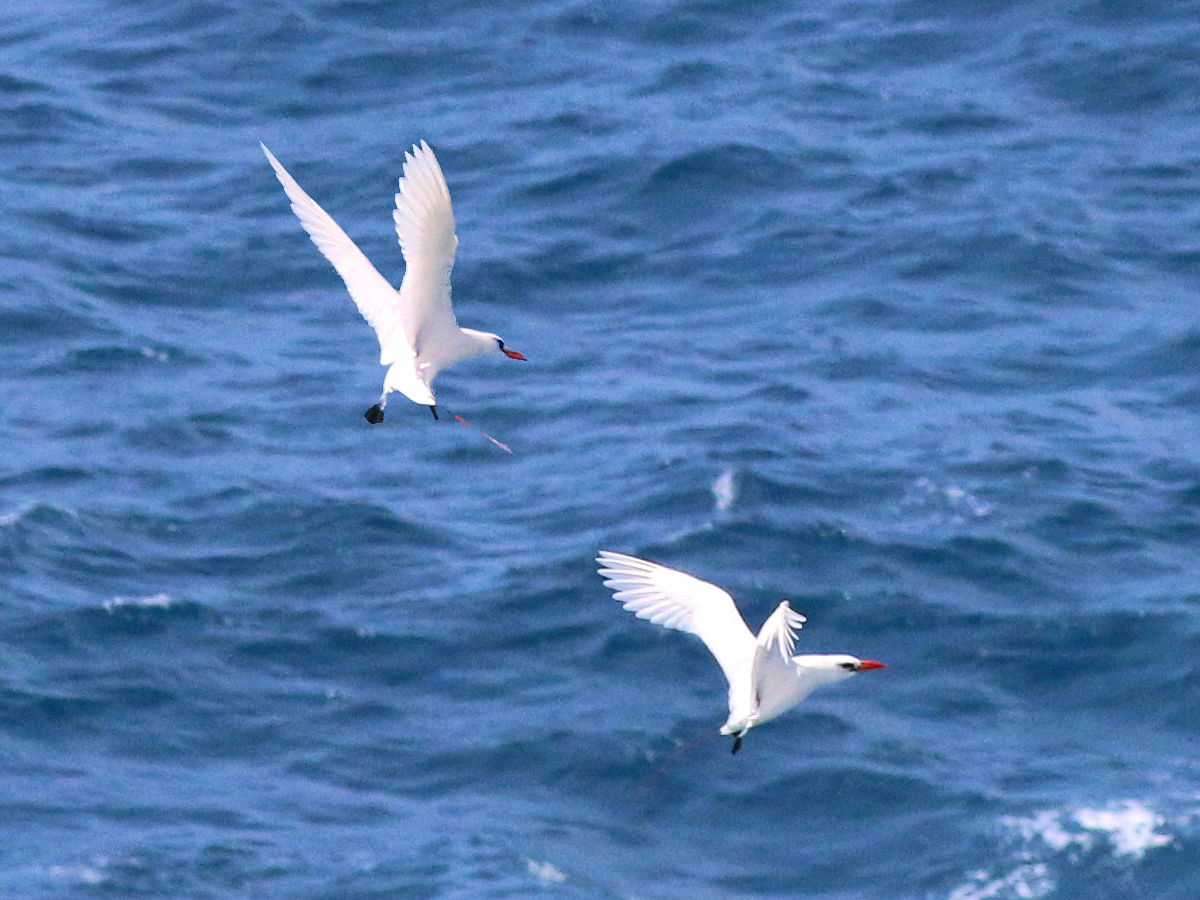
Red-tailed tropicbirds circling courtship

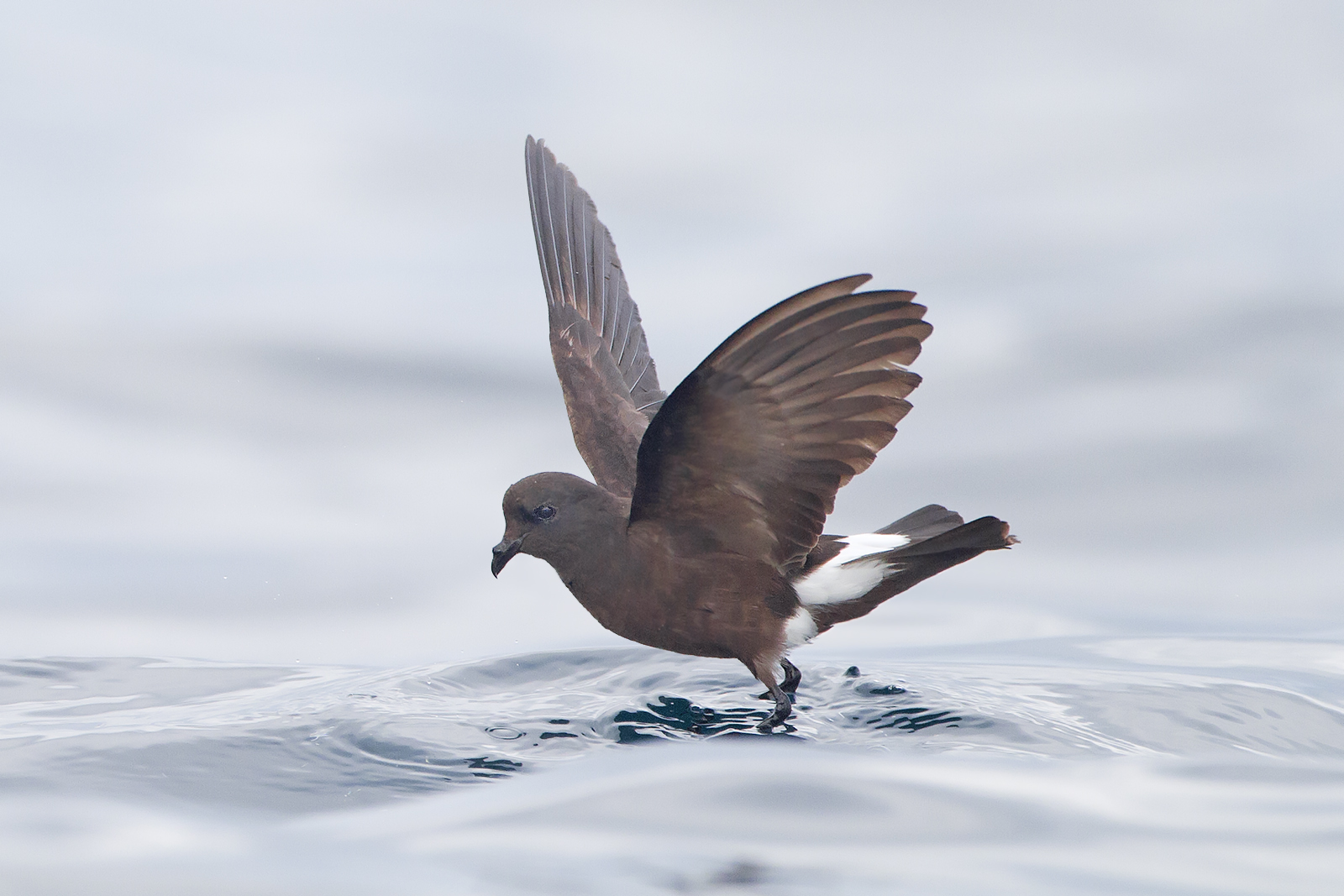
Wilson's storm petrel pattering

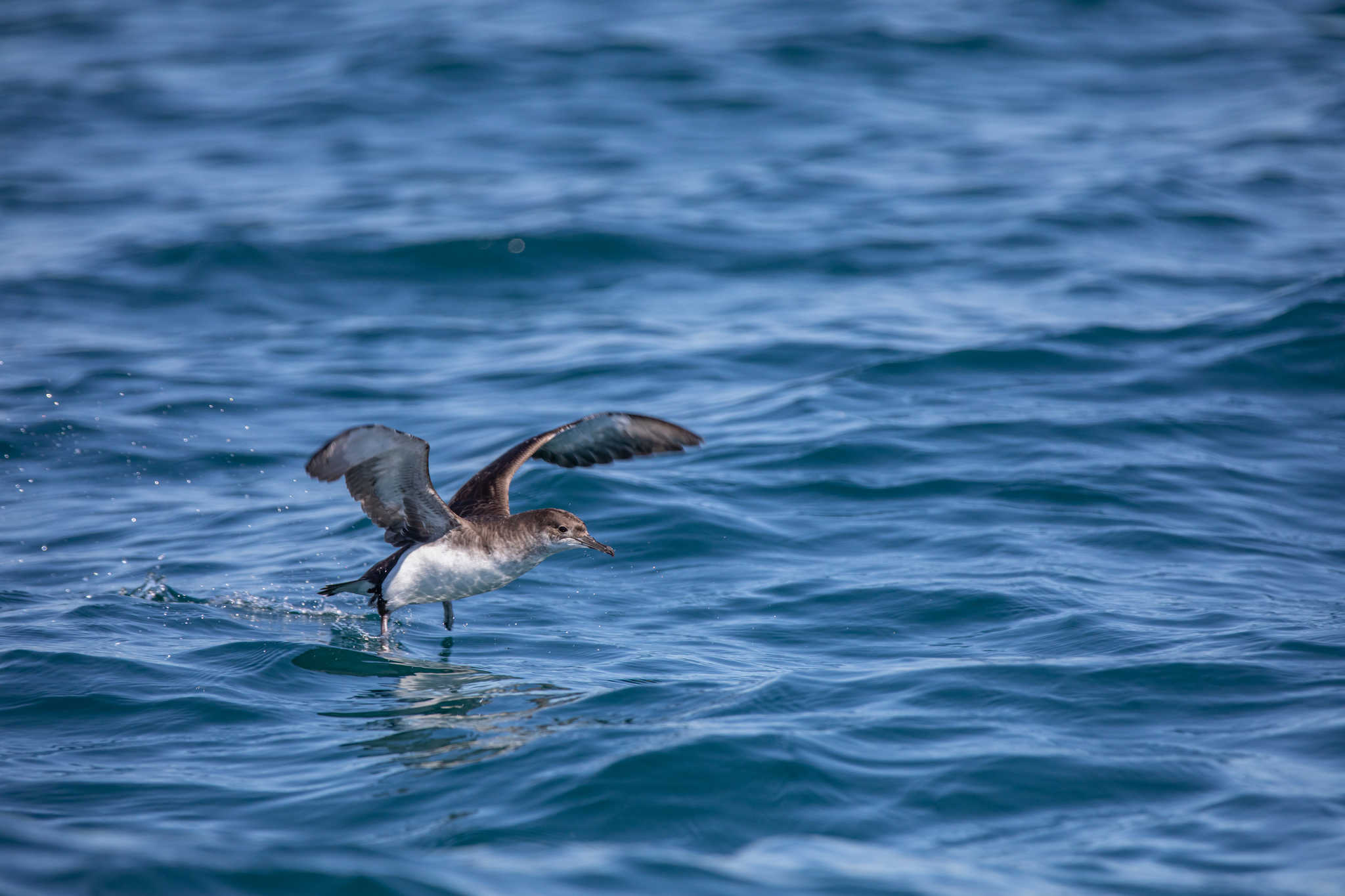
Fluttering shearwater pattering

== See Also ==
- Harrier Jump Jet
