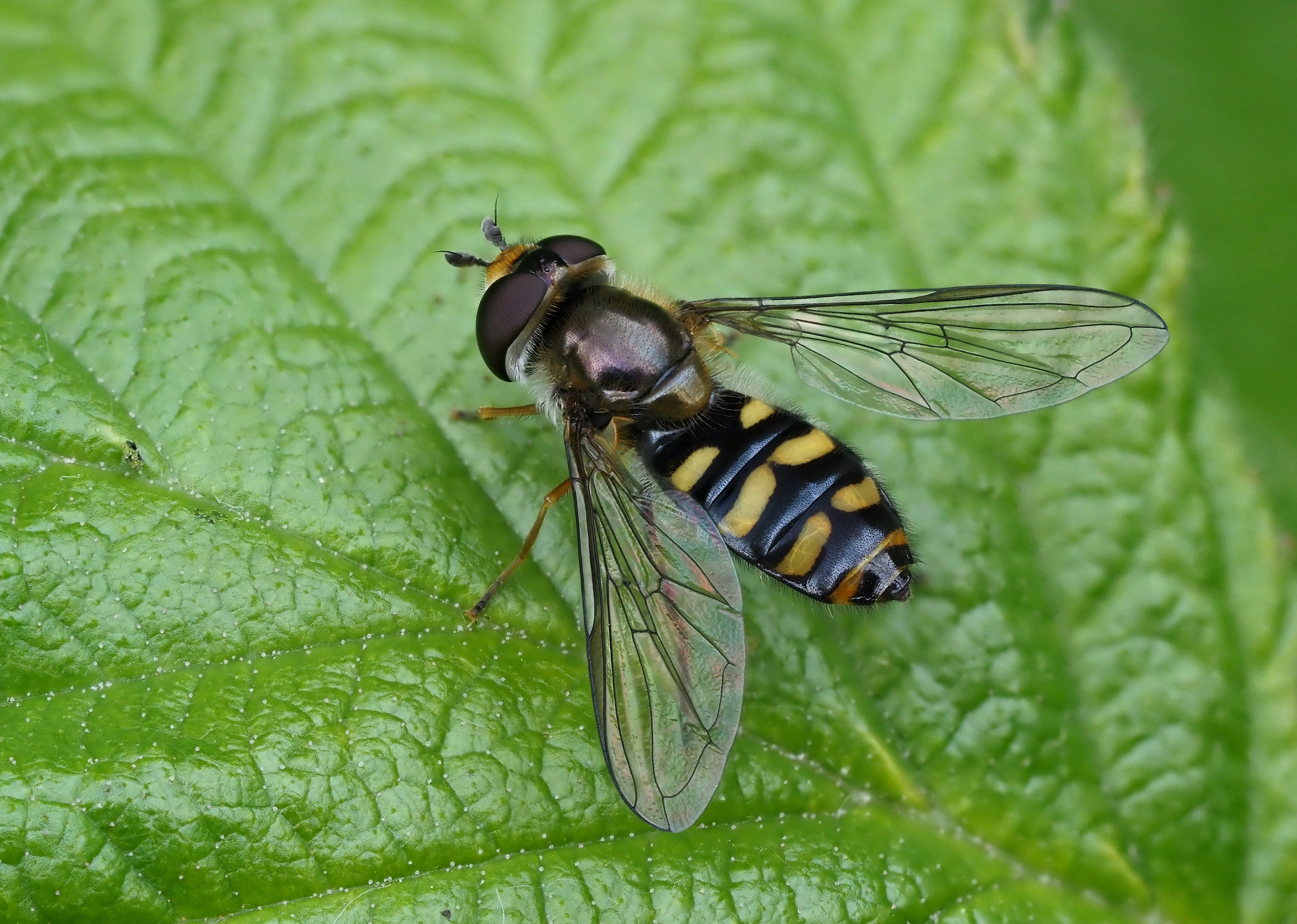
- Eupeodes bucculatus

Scientific classification
- Kingdom: Animalia
- Phylum: Arthropoda
- Clade: Pancrustacea
- Class: Insecta
- Order: Diptera
- Family: Syrphidae
- Genus: Eupeodes
- Subgenus: Eupeodes
- Species: E. bucculatus

Binomial name
- Eupeodes bucculatus (Rondani, 1857 )

Synonyms
- Syrphus latilunulatus (Collin, 1931)

= Eupeodes bucculatus =

Species of fly

Eupeodes bucculatus is a Palearctic hoverfly.

== Description ==
External images Eupeodes bucculatus is very similar to Eupeodes luniger, Eupeodes latifasciatus, and Eupeodes nielseni and difficult to identify The adult insect is illustrated in colour by Torp (1994) and Bartsch et al (2009). and Torp (1994)

== Distribution ==
Eupeodes bucculatus is found across continental Europe, ranging from Norway, Sweden and Denmark to as far south as Portugal and Italy. It occurs within the United Kingdom and Ireland, further east through Central Europe to Switzerland.

== Biology ==
Found along riverside and alluvial forest of Populus and Salix and in mature fen carr of Salix and Betula. Flowers visited include Euphorbia, Narthecium, Salix, Sorbus aucuparia and Stellaria. Adults fly April to May and July to August.
