= Lapposyrphus =

Scientific classification
- Kingdom: Animalia
- Phylum: Arthropoda
- Class: Insecta
- Order: Diptera
- Family: Syrphidae
- Subfamily: Syrphinae
- Tribe: Syrphini
- Genus: Lapposyrphus; Dušek & Láska, 1967

Genus of flies

Lapposyrphus is a genus of hoverfly, formerly included in the genus Eupeodes.

== Species ==
There are two species assigned to this genus:

- Lapposyrphus abberrantis (Curran, 1925)
- Lapposyrphus lapponicus (Zetterstedt, 1838)
