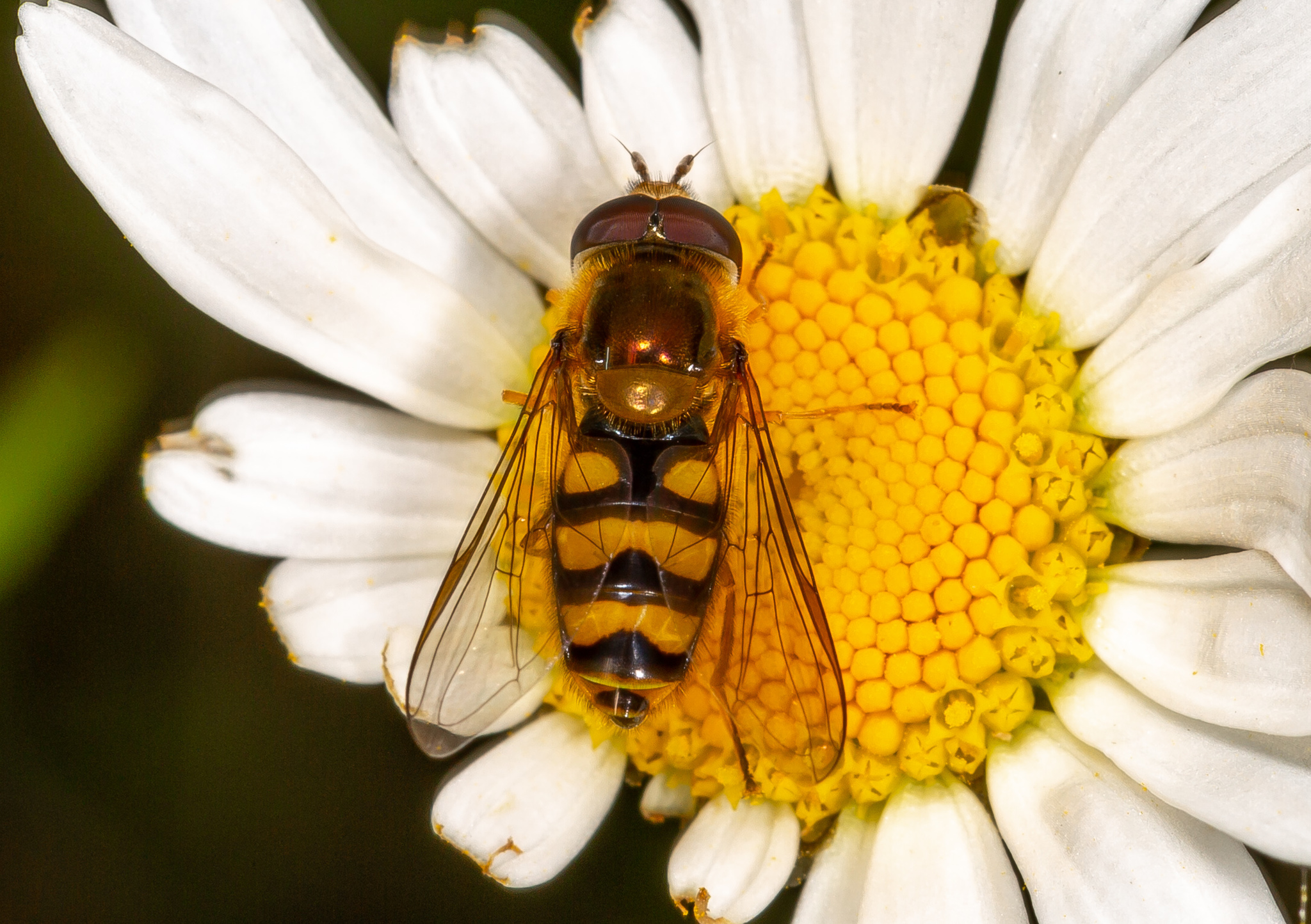

Scientific classification
- Kingdom: Animalia
- Phylum: Arthropoda
- Class: Insecta
- Order: Diptera
- Family: Syrphidae
- Genus: Eupeodes
- Species: E. nitens

Binomial name
- Eupeodes nitens (Zetterstedt, 1843)

= Eupeodes nitens =

Species of fly

Eupeodes nitens is a Palearctic species of hoverfly.

== Description ==
Resembles other Eupeodes. Determination is problematic. Key references are Van der Goot, V.S. (1981) The adult insect is illustrated in colour by Stubbs and Falk (1983).

== Distribution and biology ==
It is found from Fennoscandia south to the Pyrenees and from England eastwards through Central and Southern into Siberia and the Russian Far East on to the Pacific coast in Fagus forest and alpine grassland from May August.
