= Eupeodes snowi =

Scientific classification
- Domain: Eukaryota
- Kingdom: Animalia
- Phylum: Arthropoda
- Class: Insecta
- Order: Diptera
- Family: Syrphidae
- Genus: Eupeodes
- Species: E. snowi

Binomial name
- Eupeodes snowi Wehr, 1924

Species of fly

Eupeodes snowi is a species of syrphid fly in the family Syrphidae.
