= Eupeodes rojasi =

Scientific classification
- Kingdom: Animalia
- Phylum: Arthropoda
- Class: Insecta
- Order: Diptera
- Family: Syrphidae
- Genus: Eupeodes
- Subgenus: Metasyrphus
- Species: E. rojasi

Binomial name
- Eupeodes rojasi (Thompson, 1999)

Species of fly

Eupeodes rojasi is a species of hoverfly. It is named after Sergio Rojas, the administrator of the Subestación Experimental La Cruz (Chile). It feeds on Eriosoma lanigerum and is found in western South America.

== Description ==
Its face is yellow except for a narrow brown medial vitta. Its gena is yellow and shiny. Its frontal lunule is brown except yellowish medially. The antenna is orange ventrally and blackish brown dorsally. Its basoflagellomere is oval, about 3 times as long as the pedicel.

Its thorax is dark bluish black The scutum is dark bluish black except yellowish on the notopleuron. The pronotum is densely yellowish gray. Its halter is yellow. Legs: coxae and trochanters are blackish brown; metatarsus brownish orange on its basotarsomere and apical tarsomere, black elsewhere.

Its wing is hyaline and microtrichose except bare basomedially. The abdomen is black with yellow maculate pattern. Its 1st tergum is bluish black; 2nd tergum is black except for large yellow basolateral macula; 3rd tergum is black except for large yellow fascia; 4th tergum is black except for large yellow fascia and apical margin; 5th tergum is yellow except for a basomedial narrow black fascia. Its 1st sternum is yellow except for a small medial brown macula; 2nd sternum is yellow except for large triangular black medial macula; 3rd sternum is yellow except for a large triangular black medial macula; 4th sternum is yellow except for a small brown medial macula; 5th sternum is yellow. Its terminalia are yellow except for the 8th sternum, which is largely black with black pilose.

== See also ==
- Insect anatomy
