= Eupeodes confrater =

Scientific classification
- Kingdom: Animalia
- Phylum: Arthropoda
- Clade: Pancrustacea
- Class: Insecta
- Order: Diptera
- Family: Syrphidae
- Genus: Eupeodes
- Species: E. confrater

Binomial name
- Eupeodes confrater (Wiedemann, 1830)

Species of fly

Eupeodes confrater is a species of hoverfly found in Australia and south-east Asia, including India, Sri Lanka, Pakistan, China, and Afghanistan.

== Description ==
E. confrater is a large hoverfly, black to metallic green in colour with three yellow bands on the abdomen. It has a whitish yellow face with a dark medial stripe.

Larvae are chalky white with grey patches, tapering toward one end.

== Biology ==
Adults are active throughout the year, and larvae feed on aphids.
