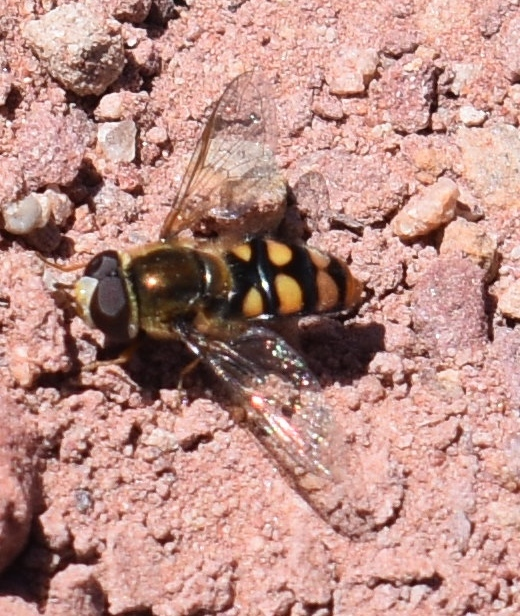
- Eupeodes flukei, Colorado

Scientific classification
- Domain: Eukaryota
- Kingdom: Animalia
- Phylum: Arthropoda
- Class: Insecta
- Order: Diptera
- Family: Syrphidae
- Genus: Eupeodes
- Species: E. flukei

Binomial name
- Eupeodes flukei (Jones, 1917)

Synonyms
- Syrphus flukei Jones, 1917; Syrphus palliventris Curran, 1925

= Eupeodes flukei =

Species of fly

Eupeodes flukei is a species of syrphid fly in the family Syrphidae. It is found in North America, generally from Colorado to the northwest.
