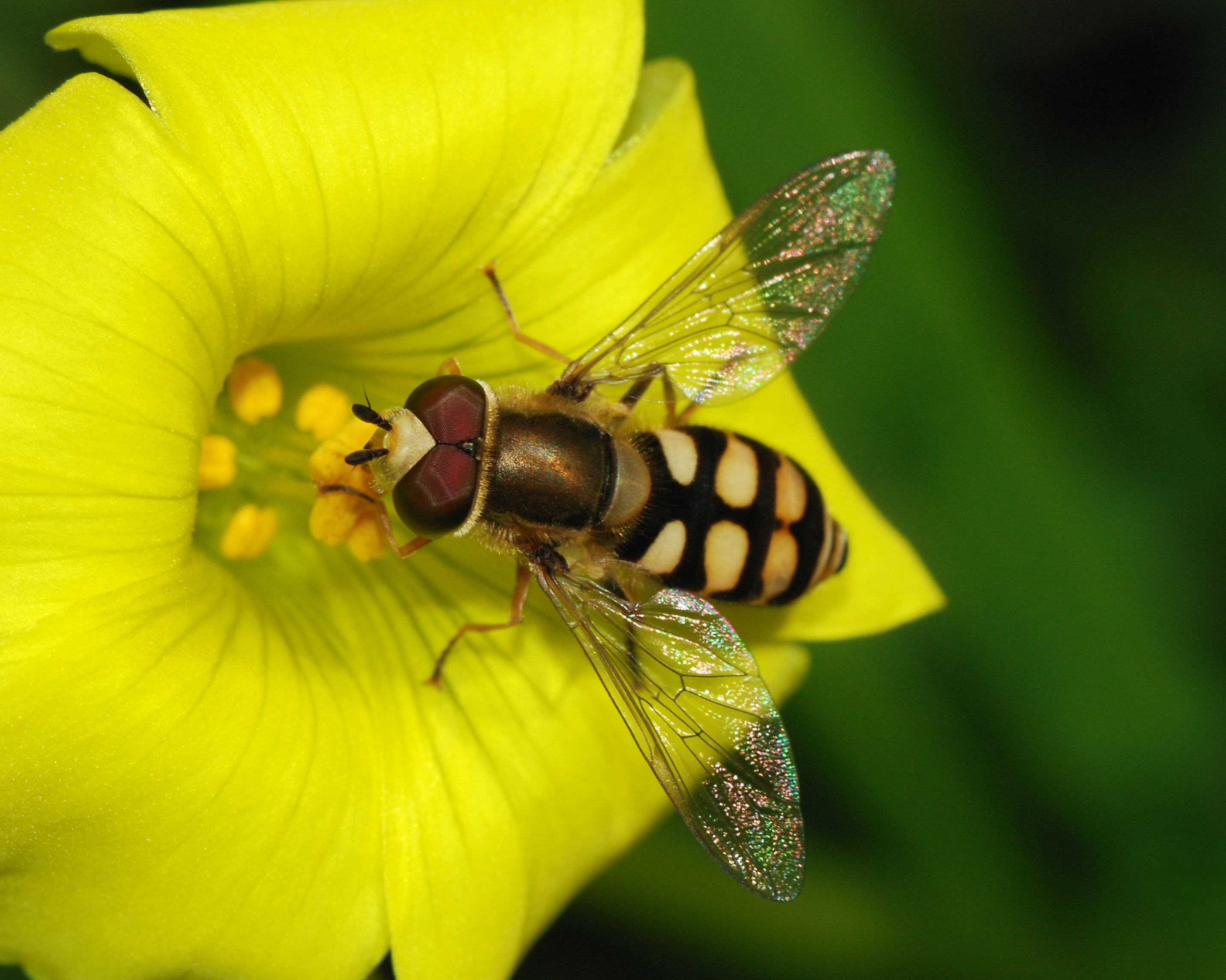
- Eupeodes corollae male
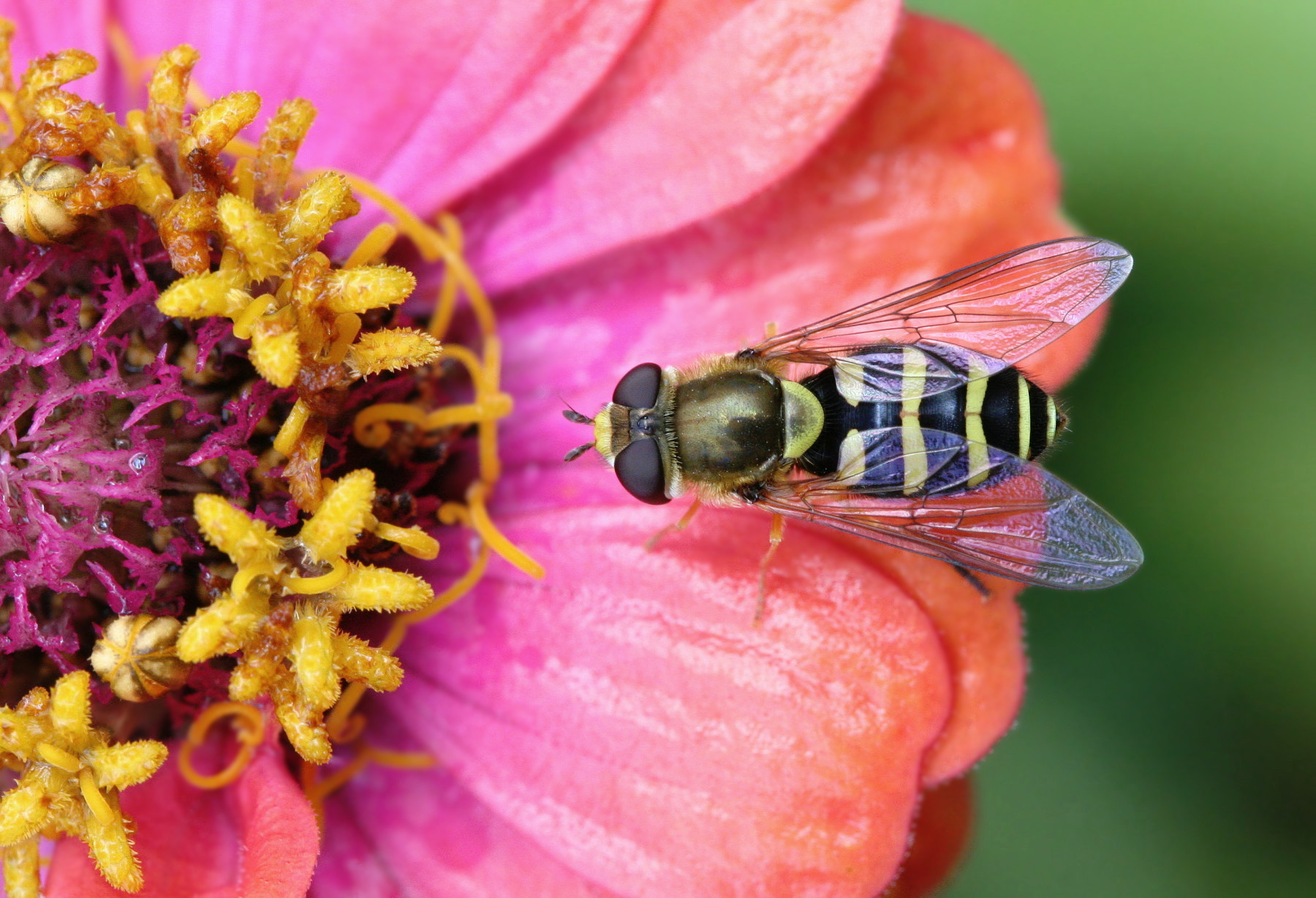
- Eupeodes americanus female

Scientific classification
- Kingdom: Animalia
- Phylum: Arthropoda
- Clade: Pancrustacea
- Class: Insecta
- Order: Diptera
- Family: Syrphidae
- Tribe: Syrphini
- Genus: Eupeodes; Osten Sacken, 1877

Subgenus
- Eupeodes Osten Sacken, 1877; Macrosyrphus Matsumura, 1917; Metasyrphus Matsumura, 1917

Synonyms
- Posthosyrphus Enderlein, 1938

= Eupeodes =

Genus of flies

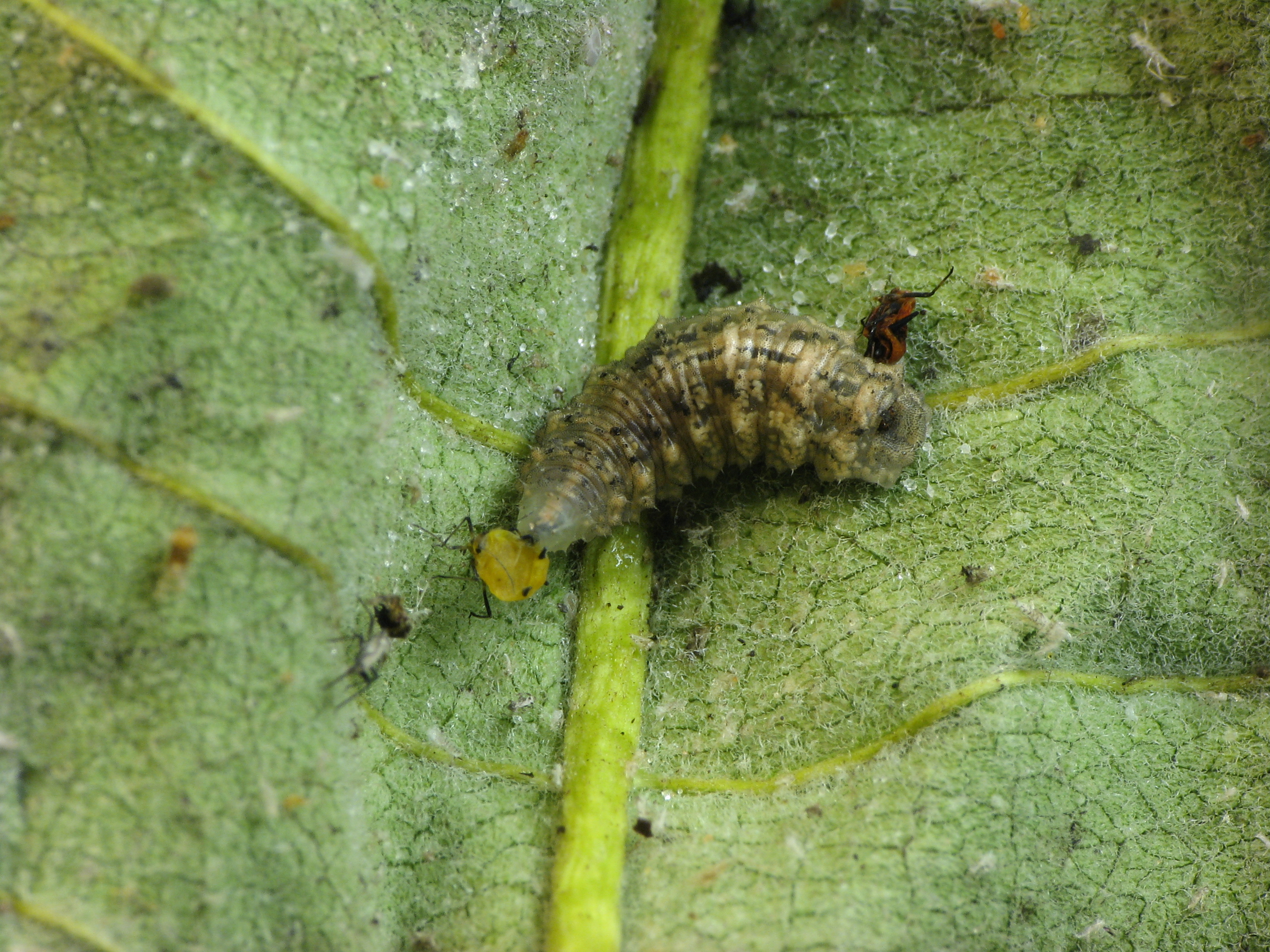
Eupeodes americanus, larva

Eupeodes, the aphideater flies, are a genus of moderate hoverflies in the family Syrphidae. They are distributed worldwide. They are black with yellow markings and can be easily confused with other genera in the Syrphini tribe. Larvae feed on a wide variety of aphids. The adults feed on nectar and pollen as sources of energy and protein, respectively, and often hover over the plants they visit.

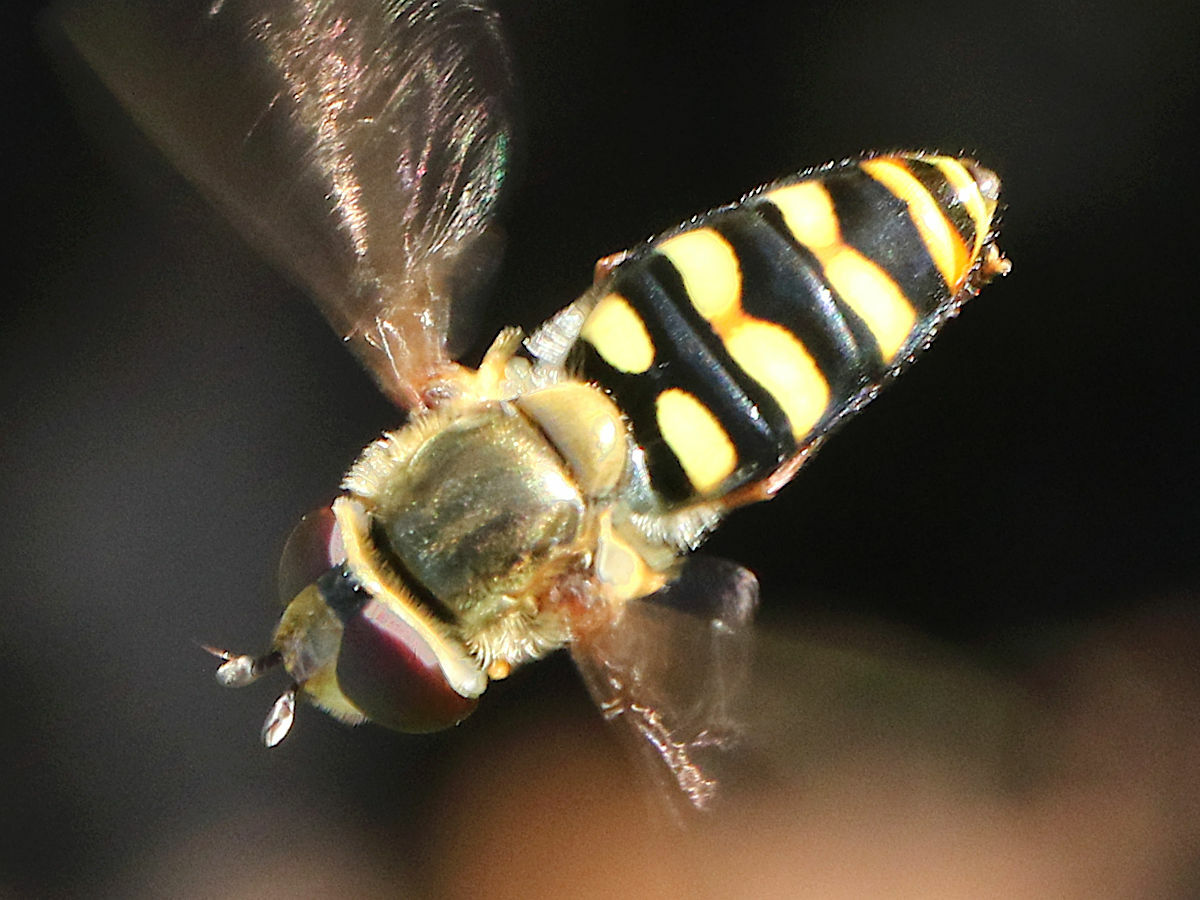
E. fumipennis female hovering

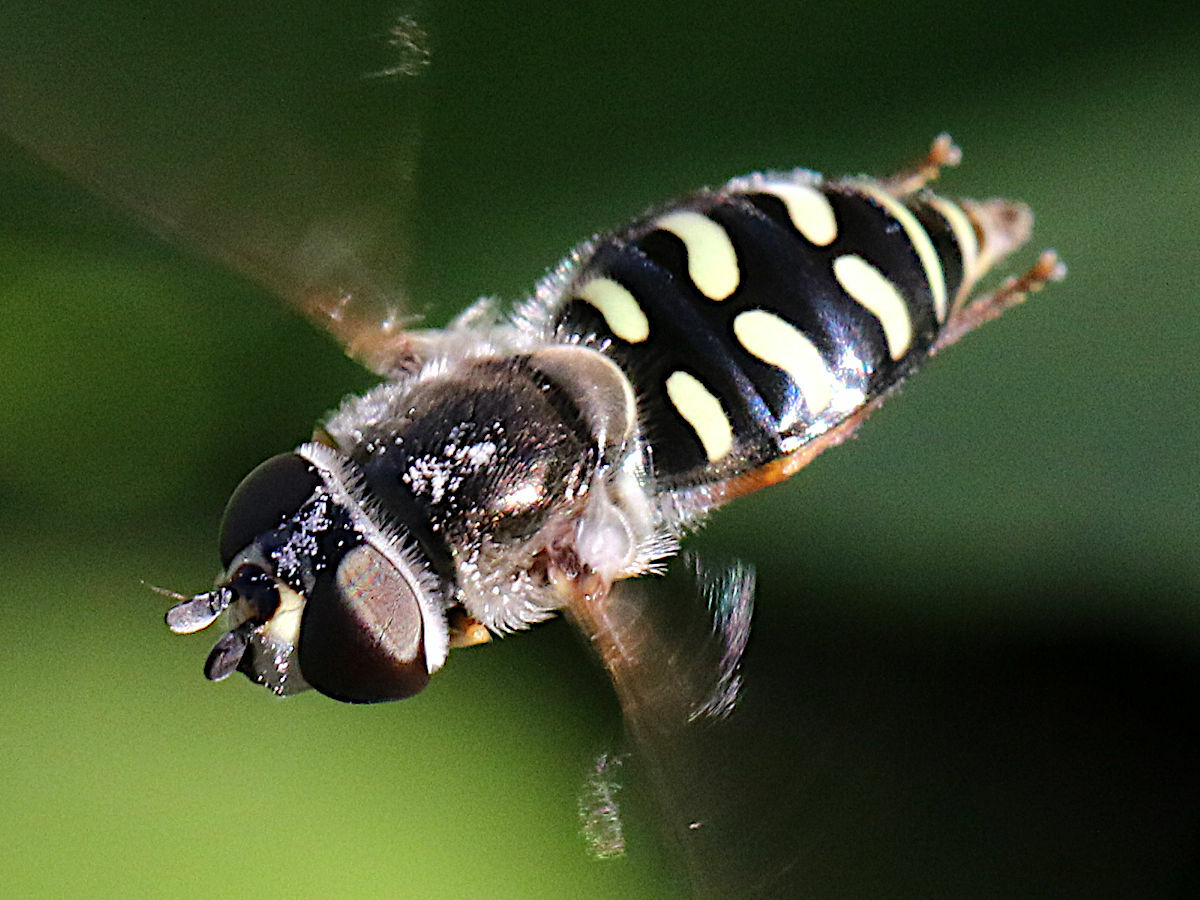
E. volucris female hovering

== Description ==
The aphideater flies are 6–14 mm (0.24–0.55 in) in length. The eyes have either no hairs, or rarely, very short and sparse hairs. The face is usually yellow, with a narrow but distinct brown middle stripe.

The scutum is usually shining black, but rarely a 'frosty' yellow on the sides. The scutellum is dull yellow, and translucent. The underside of the insect is moderately dense with hairs. The pleura are black or grayish black, never yellow, usually shining or very slightly 'frosty' looking on the upper half. The anterior anepisternum (mesothorax), meron, and metepisternum (the front part of the side wall of the metathorax) are all bare.

The abdomen is oval, usually nearly flat above, with a strong margin from near the middle of tergite 2 to the apex of tergite 5. Tergite 2 typically has a pair of yellow spots, while the other tergites usually have pale yellow to reddish yellow spots commonly crescent shaped, or with bands of similar colour almost straight. The wing vein R_{4+5} is nearly straight, or slightly but distinctly dipped into cell r_{4+5}. The wing membrane is usually nearly entirely covered in microtrichia, with only small bare areas near the base (Syrphus has tufts of hair on the lobes of its forewings).

The legs are slender, and the hind femur is unarmed. The hind hip does not have hairs at the posteromedial apical angle (in the back and towards the middle, pointed up).

== Species ==
- Eupeodes aberrantis (Curran, 1925)
- Eupeodes abiskoensis (Dušek & Láska, 1973)
- Eupeodes aino (Matsumura, 1918)
- Eupeodes alaceris (He & Li, 1998)
- Eupeodes americanus (Wiedemann, 1830)
- Eupeodes angustus (He, 1992)
- Eupeodes (Metasyrphus) asiaticus (Peck, 1972)
- Eupeodes aurosus (He, 1993)
- Eupeodes beppuensis (Matsumura, 1918)
- Eupeodes biciki (Nielsen, 2003)
- Eupeodes borealis (Dušek & Láska, 1973)
- Eupeodes bucculatus (Rondani, 1857)
- Eupeodes chengi (He, 1992)
- Eupeodes cheni (He, 1993)
- Eupeodes confertus (Fluke, 1952)
- Eupeodes (Macrosyrphus) confrater (Wiedemann, 1830)
- Eupeodes corollae (Fabricius, 1794)
- Eupeodes curtus (Hine, 1922)
- Eupeodes diminutus (Matsumura, 1918)
- Eupeodes duseki (Mazanek, Láska & Bicík, 1999)
- Eupeodes eosus (He, 1992)
- Eupeodes epicharus (He, 1992)
- Eupeodes erasmus (He, 1992)
- Eupeodes fallax (Matsumura, 1918)
- Eupeodes flaviceps (Rondani, 1857)
- Eupeodes (Metasyrphus) flavofasciatus (Ho, 1987)
- Eupeodes flukei (Jones, 1917)
- Eupeodes (Metasyrphus) frequens (Matsumura, 1917)
- Eupeodes fumipennis (Thomson, 1869)
- Eupeodes gentneri (fluke, 1952)
- Eupeodes goeldlini (Mazanek, Láska & Bicík, 1999)
- Eupeodes hakiensis (Matsumura, 1917)
- Eupeodes harbinensis (He, 1992)
- Eupeodes (Macrosyrphus) horishanus (Matsumura, 1917)
- Eupeodes indistinctus (Matsumura, 1918)
- Eupeodes ishiyamensis (Matsumura, 1918)
- Eupeodes isshikii (Matsumura, 1918)
- Eupeodes karafutonis (Matsumura, 1917)
- Eupeodes kawaguchii (Matsumura, 1917)
- Eupeodes (Metasyrphus) kirgizorum (Peck, 1969)
- Eupeodes (Metasyrphus) klapperichi (Dušek & Láska, 1980)
- Eupeodes kuroiwae (Matsumura, 1917)
- Eupeodes lambecki (Dušek & Láska, 1973)
- Eupeodes lapponicus (Zetterstedt, 1838)
- Eupeodes latifasciatus (Macquart, 1829)
- Eupeodes latilunulatus (Collin, 1931)
- Eupeodes (Metasyrphus) latimacula (Peck, 1969)
- Eupeodes lepidi (He & Li, 1998)
- Eupeodes liaoensis (Huo, 2020)
- Eupeodes lucasi (Marcos-García & Láska, 1983)
- Eupeodes lundbecki (Soot-Ryen, 1946)
- Eupeodes luniger (Meigen, 1822)
- Eupeodes medius (Matsumura, 1918)
- Eupeodes misomapensis (Matsumura, 1918)
- Eupeodes montanus (Curran, 1925)
- Eupeodes montivagus (Snow, 1895)
- Eupeodes (Metasyrphus) nakajimensis (Matsumura, 1918)
- Eupeodes neoperplexus (Curran, 1925)
- Eupeodes nielseni (Dušek & Láska, 1976)
- Eupeodes nigroventris (Fluke, 1933)
- Eupeodes nitens (Zetterstedt, 1843)
- Eupeodes noboritoensis (Ninomiya)
- Eupeodes nuba (Wiedemann, 1830)
- Eupeodes ohmi (Kassebeer, 2000)
- Eupeodes (Macrosyrphus) okinawensis (Matsumura, 1916)
- Eupeodes parvus (He, 1990)
- Eupeodes perplexus (Osburn, 1910)
- Eupeodes pingreensis (Fluke, 1930)
- Eupeodes pomus (Curran, 1921)
- Eupeodes punctifer (Frey, 1934)
- Eupeodes punctifer (Kanervo, 1934)
- Eupeodes qingchenshanensis (He, 1990)
- Eupeodes riukiuensis (Matsumura, 1918)
- Eupeodes rojasi (Marnef, 1999)
- Eupeodes rufipunctatus (Curran, 1925)
- Eupeodes sculleni (Fluke, 1952)
- Eupeodes shirakii (Matsumura, 1918)
- Eupeodes silvaticus (He, 1993)
- Eupeodes simillicorollae (Huo, Ren & Zheng, 2007)
- Eupeodes (Metasyrphus) sinuatus (Ho, 1987)
- Eupeodes (Metasyrphus) snowi (Wehr, 1924)
- Eupeodes spurius (Matsumura, 1918)
- Eupeodes (Metasyrphus) stackelbergi (Dušek & Láska, 1980)
- Eupeodes stenopus (Matsumura, 1917)
- Eupeodes subsimus (Fluke, 1952)
- Eupeodes (Metasyrphus) taeniatus (Ho, 1987)
- Eupeodes talus (Fluke, 1933)
- Eupeodes tirolensis (Dušek & Láska, 1973)
- Eupeodes (Metasyrphus) tjanshanicus (Peck, 1966)
- Eupeodes (Metasyrphus) tshatkalensis (Peck, 1972)
- Eupeodes vandergooti (Dušek & Láska, 1973)
- Eupeodes (Metasyrphus) verruciventris (Peck, 1966)
- Eupeodes volucris (Osten Sacken, 1877)
