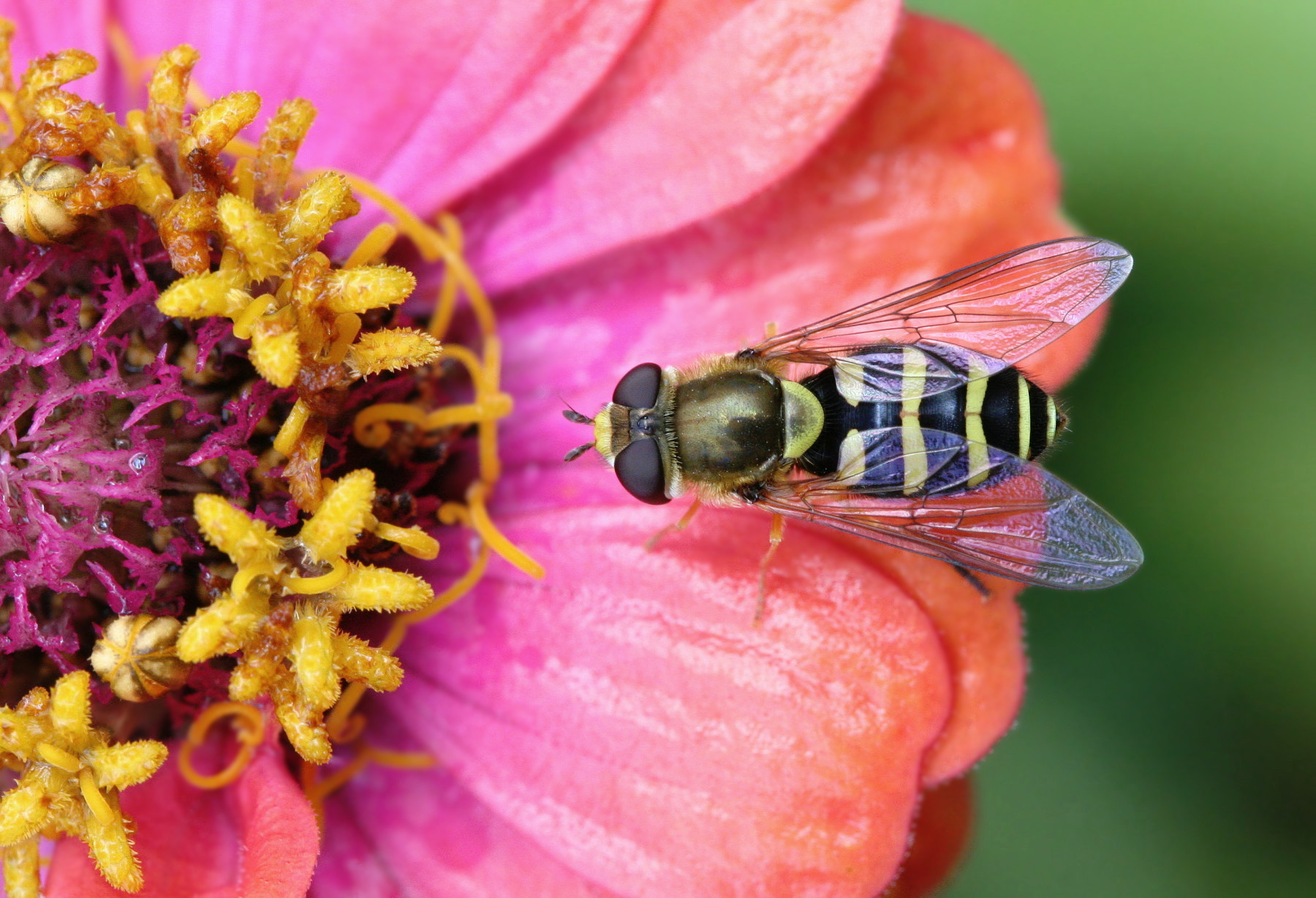

Scientific classification
- Kingdom: Animalia
- Phylum: Arthropoda
- Class: Insecta
- Order: Diptera
- Family: Syrphidae
- Genus: Eupeodes
- Species: E. americanus

Binomial name
- Eupeodes americanus Wiedemann, 1830

Synonyms
- Syrphus americanus Wiedemann, 1830; Syrphus canadensis Curran, 1926; Syrphus lebanoensis Fluke, 1930; Syrphus medius Jones, 1917; Syrphus wiedemanni Johnson, 1919

= Eupeodes americanus =

American hoverfly

Species of fly

Eupeodes americanus, the American hoverfly, is found throughout North America and inhabits meadows, and fields with flowers and foliage. Adults feed on nectar, whereas their larvae feed on aphids. The adult fly is black to metallic green, and has three yellow bands on its abdomen. Its face is a light yellow with large black compound eyes on either side, and its wings are clear; it is 9–12 mm in body length. The larvae are mature at around 11 mm, and they are yellow-white to salmon brown, with markings of black and white or yellow-white. The lighter markings consist of a transverse rectangular bars on segments 6 to 11, and a narrow line along each side of the larvae. Early instars have visible black setae. The larvae are active feeders. They are being considered as suitable biological control agents for aphids and scale insects. This species is considered highly migratory, moving from Canada to the southeastern United States during autumn

== Gallery ==
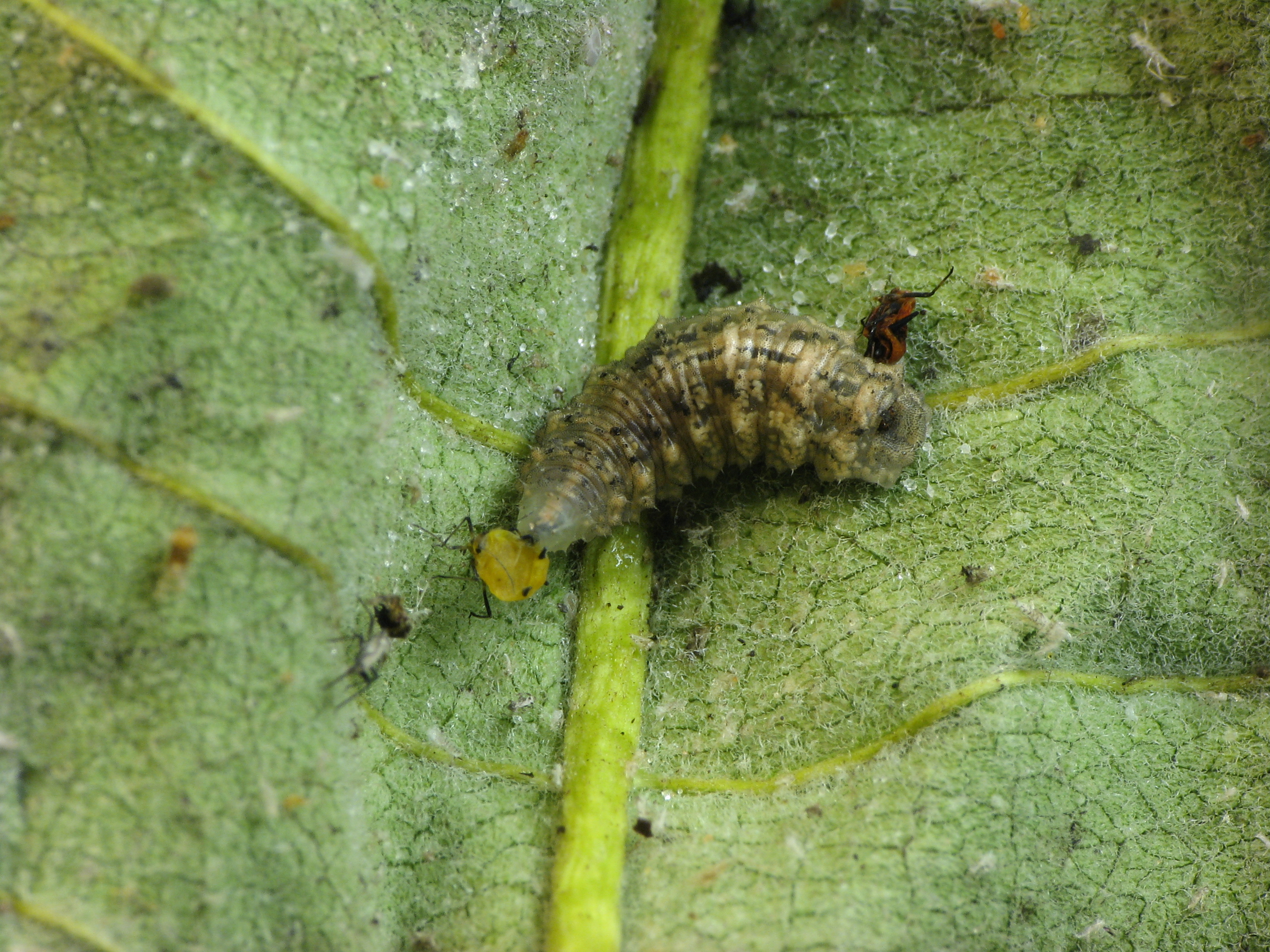
Larva

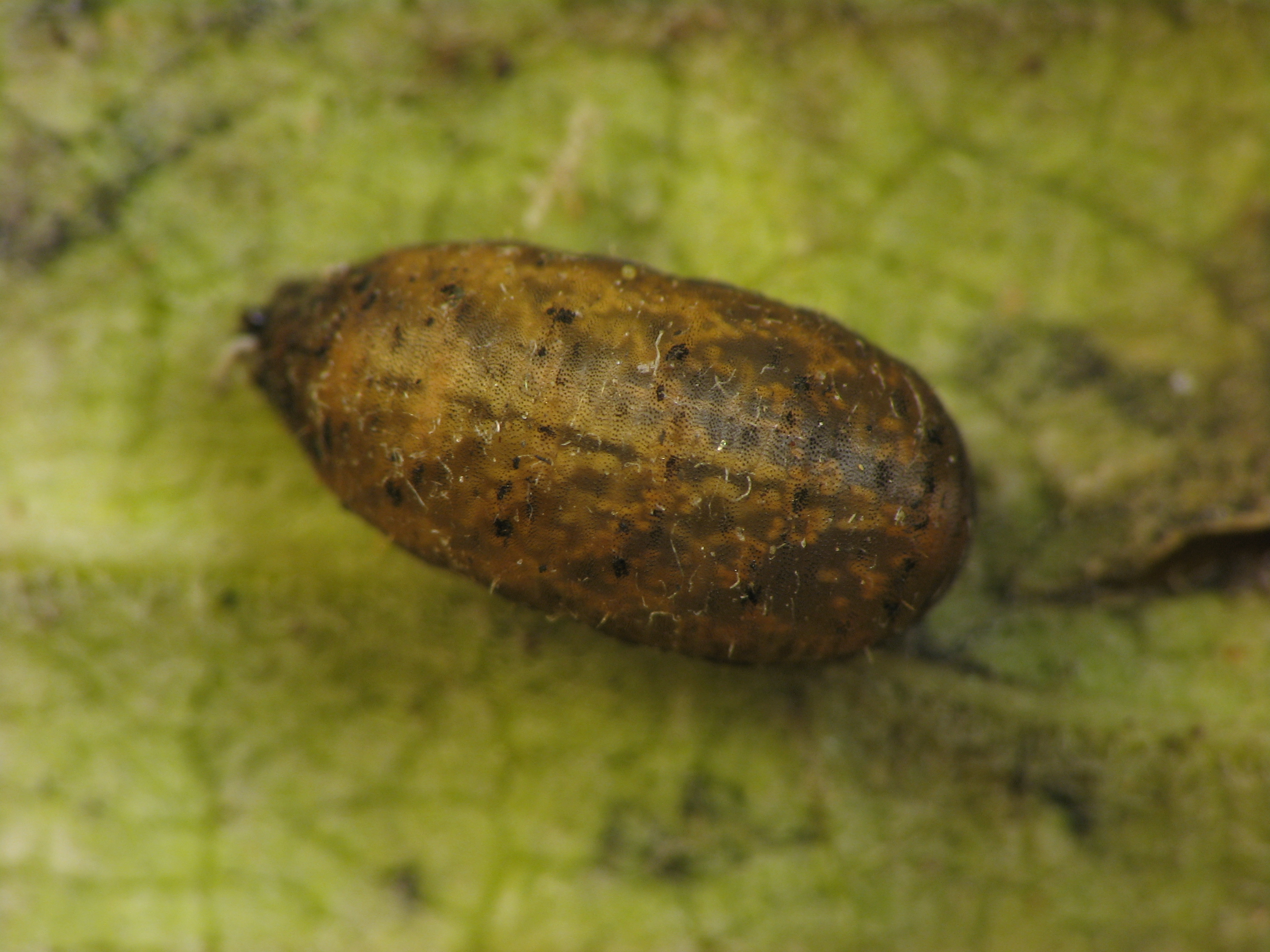
Puparium

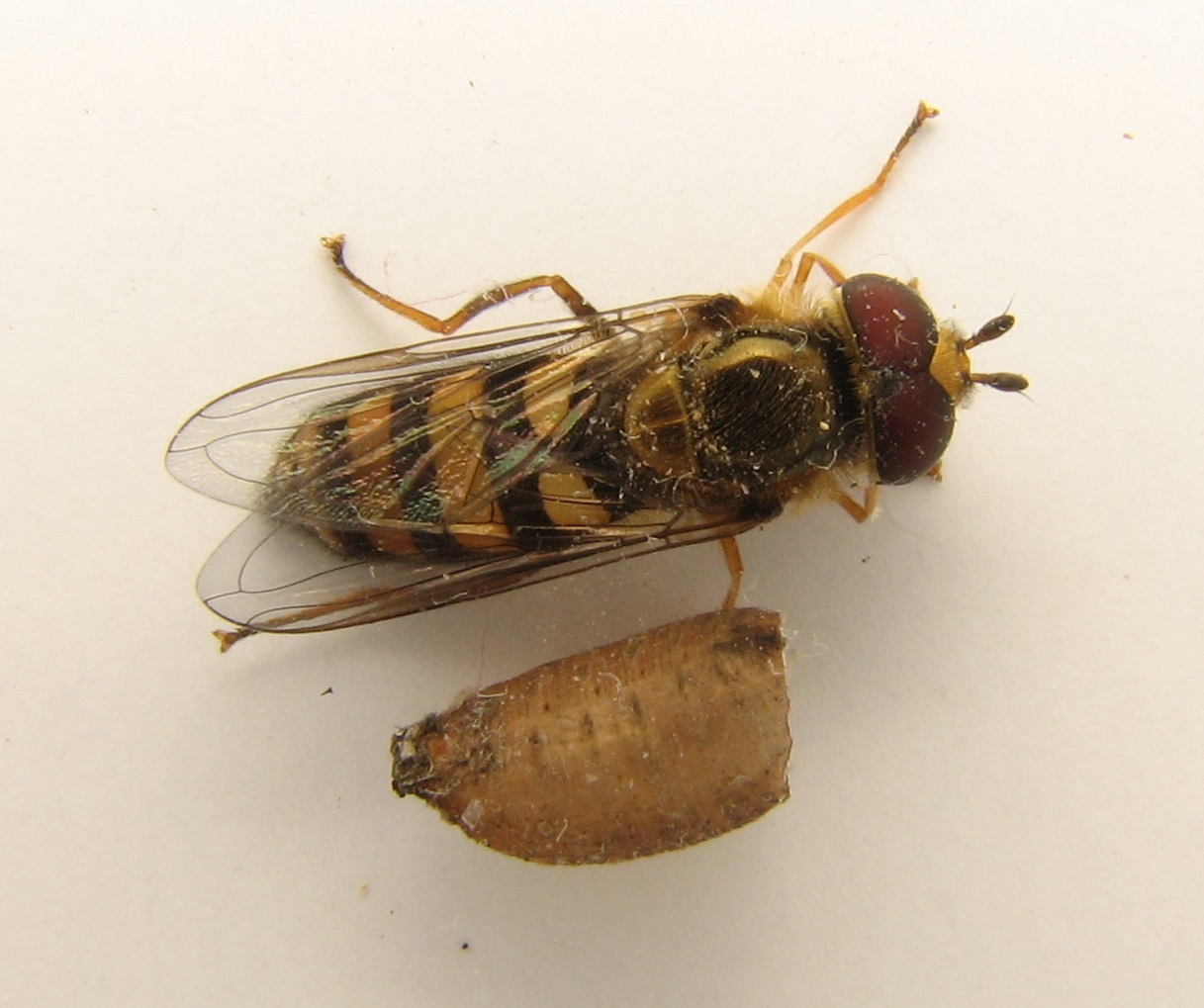
Newly emerged adult male and puparium

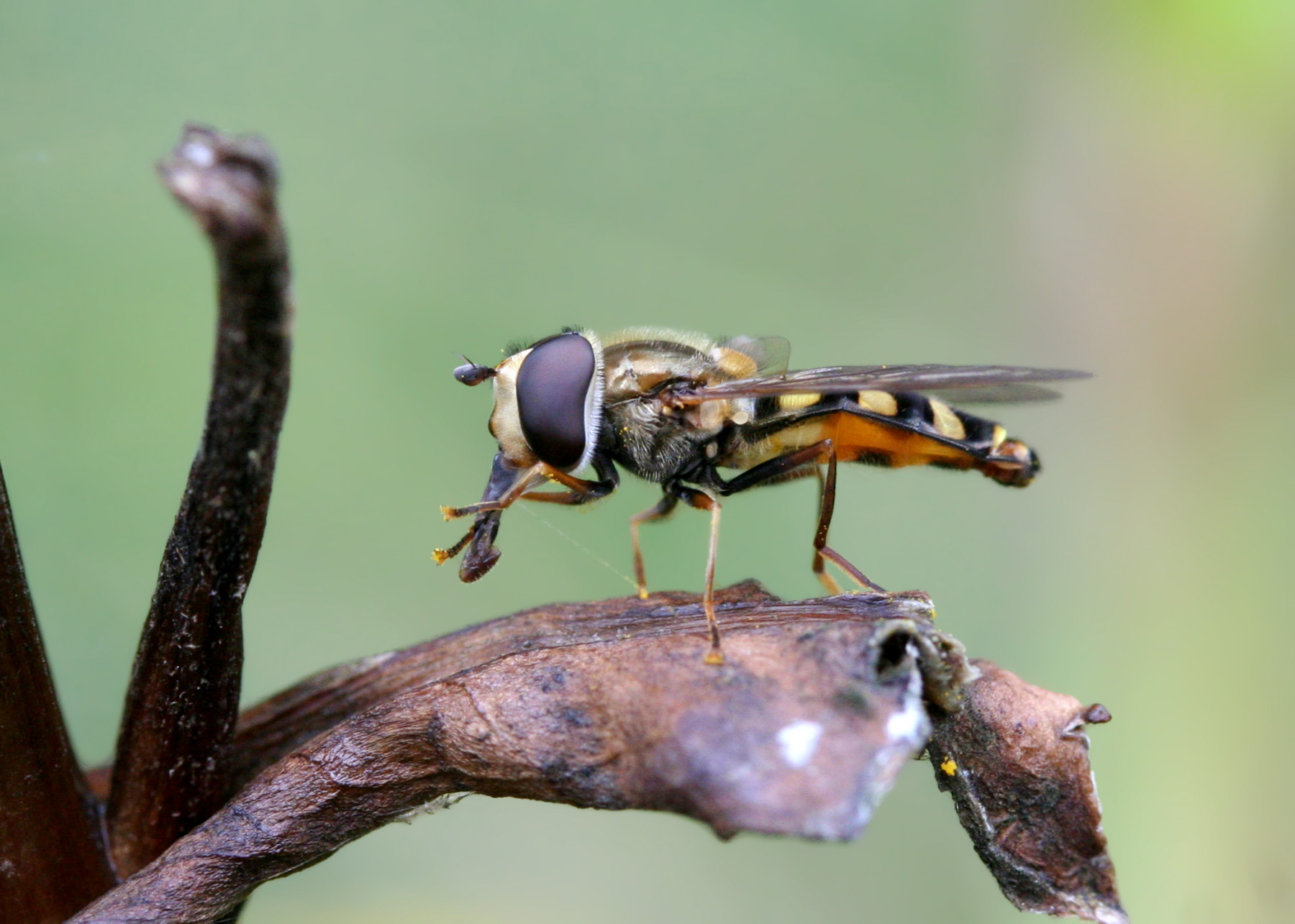
Adult
