= Eupeodes lundbecki =

Scientific classification
- Kingdom: Animalia
- Phylum: Arthropoda
- Class: Insecta
- Order: Diptera
- Family: Syrphidae
- Genus: Eupeodes
- Species: E. lundbecki

Binomial name
- Eupeodes lundbecki (Soot-Ryen), 1946

Synonyms
- Scaeva altaica Violovitsh, 1975.

Species of fly

Eupeodes lundbecki is a Palearctic hoverfly.

== Description ==
It resembles other Eupeodes. Determination is problematic. Key references are Haarto, A. & Kerppola, S. (2007) and Bartsch, H., Binkiewicz, E., Rådén, A. & Nasibov, E. (2009). and Torp (1994).

== Distribution and biology ==
Iceland, Finland and Denmark south to the Netherlands, from France eastwards through Germany, Poland and Russia into Siberia and Mongolia and through the Russian Far East to the Pacific. Large-scale movements of this species occurs out of Scandinavia in late summer. It is found in the taiga in Abies, Picea, and Pinus forest from May to October. The larvae probably feed on conifer aphids.
