= Eupeodes punctifer =

Scientific classification
- Domain: Eukaryota
- Kingdom: Animalia
- Phylum: Arthropoda
- Class: Insecta
- Order: Diptera
- Family: Syrphidae
- Genus: Eupeodes
- Species: E. punctifer

Binomial name
- Eupeodes punctifer (Kanervo, 1934)

Species of fly

Eupeodes punctifer is a species of hoverflies belonging to the family Syrphidae.

It is native to Northern Europe.
