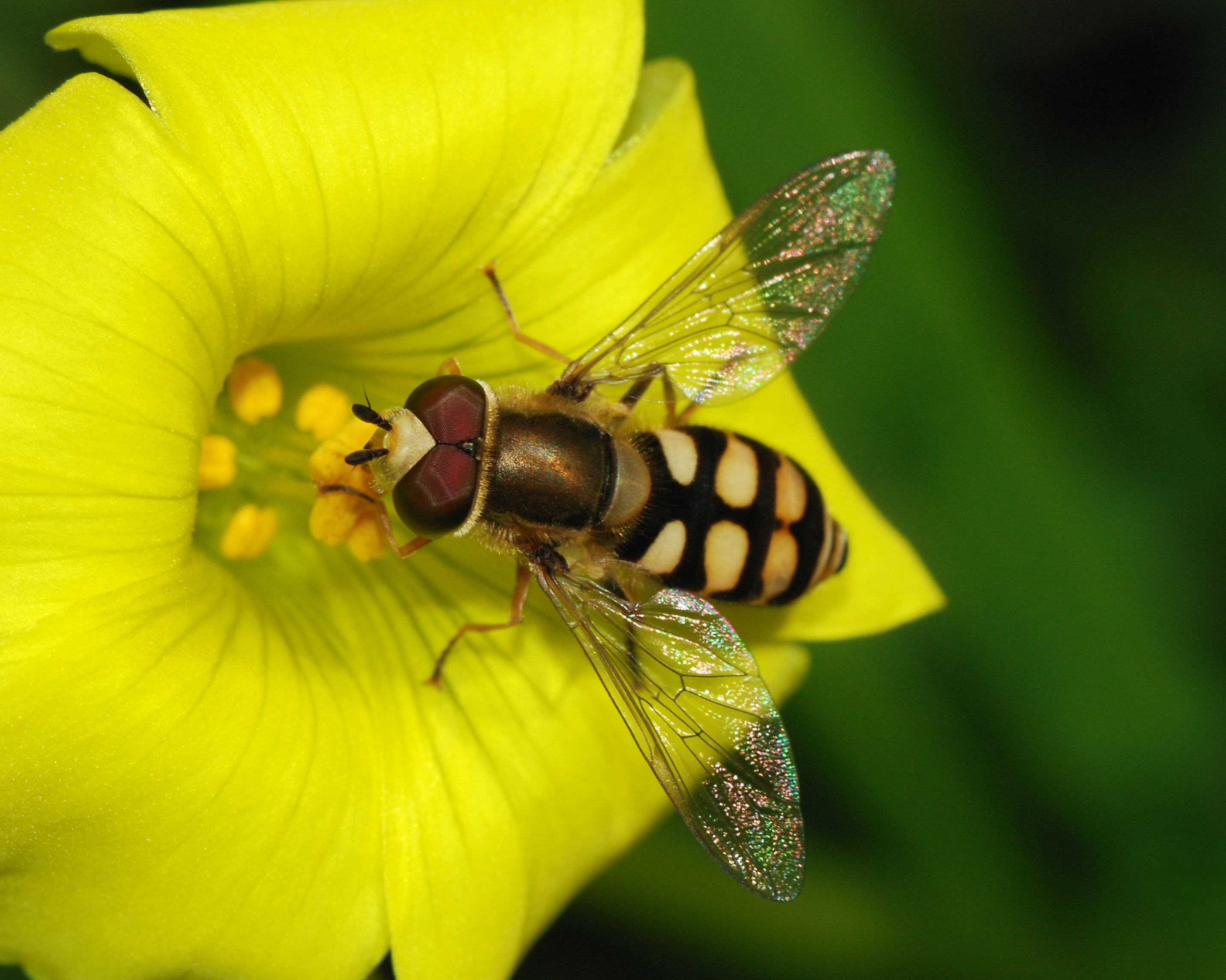
- Male
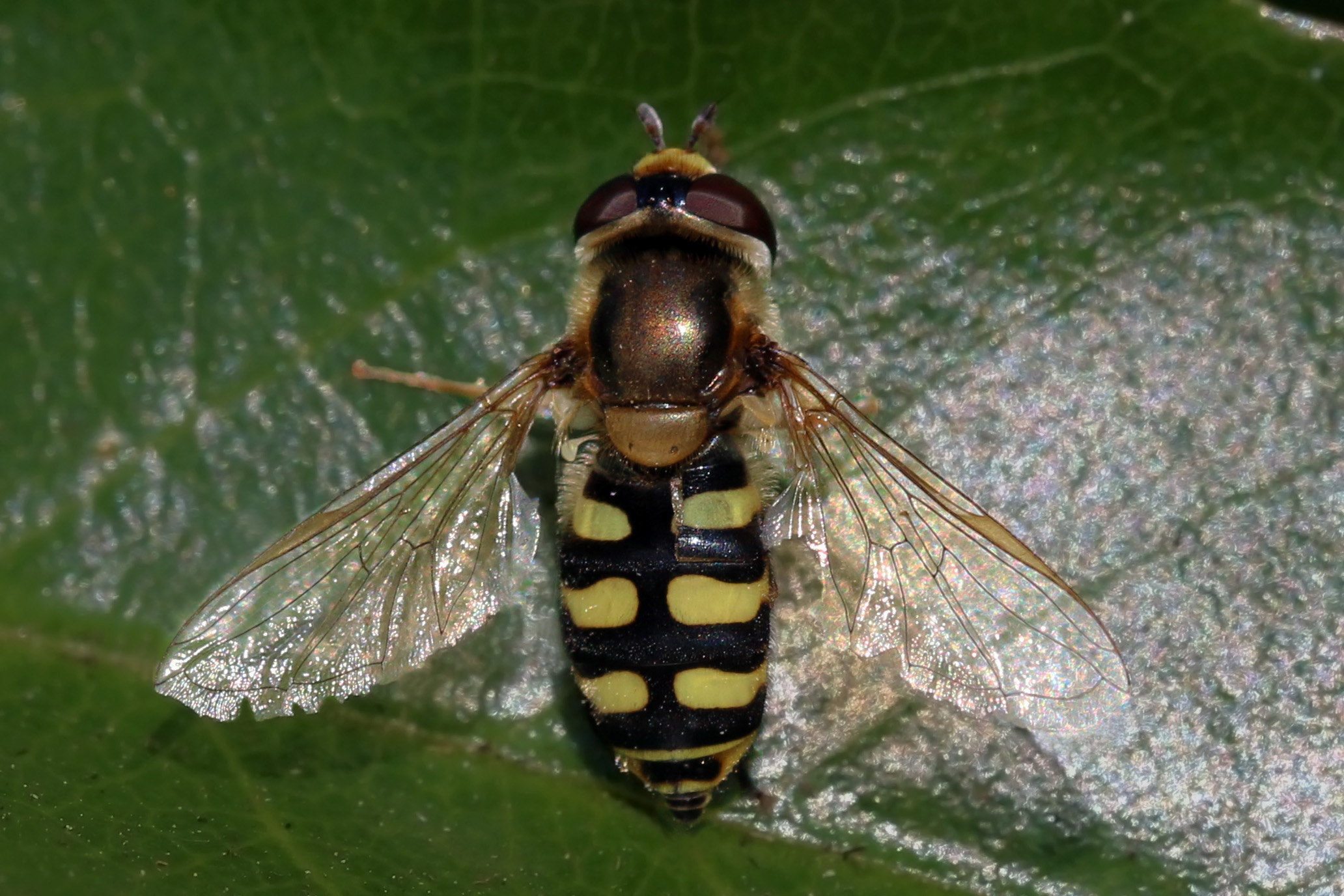
- Female

Scientific classification
- Kingdom: Animalia
- Phylum: Arthropoda
- Clade: Pancrustacea
- Class: Insecta
- Order: Diptera
- Family: Syrphidae
- Genus: Eupeodes
- Subgenus: Eupeodes
- Species: E. corollae

Binomial name
- Eupeodes corollae (Fabricius, 1794)

Synonyms
- Eupeodes consisto Harris, 1780; Musca consisto Harris, 1780; Syrphus corollae Fabricius, 1794; Metasyrphus corollae Fabricius, 1794

= Eupeodes corollae =

Species of fly

Eupeodes corollae is a very common European species of hoverfly. Adults are 6–11 millimetres (0.24–0.43 in) in body length. Males and females have different marking on the abdomen; males have square commas on tergites 3 and 4, whereas females have narrow commas. Larvae feed on aphids. This species has been used experimentally in glasshouses as a method of aphid control, and to control scale insects and aphids in fruit plantations.

E. corollae is found across Europe, North Africa and Asia. Adults are often migratory.

== Technical description ==
External images For terms see Morphology of Diptera
Wing length 5-8·25 mm. Male abdomen with pre-genital segment very large and conspicuous. Genitalia large. Yellow spots reach the side margin of tergites 3 and 4.Scutellum mainly yellow-haired. Female frons with white dust spots and junction between black ground colour and yellow spots straight.

== Distribution ==
The species is distributed in Afghanistan, Africa (as a whole), Bhutan, China, Japan, Pakistan, Europe (as a whole) and India. In India, the species is primarily distributed in the northern and north-eastern part of the country, comprising Assam, Arunachal Pradesh, Chhattisgarh, Himachal Pradesh, Jammu & Kashmir, Meghalaya, Punjab, Uttarakhand, Odisha, and WestBengal. Palaearctic Range: from Fennoscandia South to Iberia, to the Mediterranean basin. Coastal States of Africa down to South Africa. Ireland East into European Russia, Russian Far East, Siberia, to the Pacific coast and Japan. China, Formosa. The male genitalia and the larvae are figured described by Dusek & Laska (1961).

== Biology ==
Habitat: grassland, dune systems, dry river beds, garrigue, most sorts of farmland (including arable crops), suburban gardens, orchards, alpine grassland in the Alps. Hedgerows, grassy clearings in woodland, crops, gardens, tracksides, and road verges. Flowers visited include umbellifers, Achillea millefolium, Campanula rapunculoides, Chrysanthemum, Cirsium, Eschscholzia californica, Galeopsis, Hypericum, Leontodon, Origanum vulgare, Potentilla erecta, Ranunculus, Rubus fruticosus, Salix, Senecio, Tripleurospermum inodoratum, Tussilago.

The flight period is May to September (all the year in southern Europe). Information on the biology of Eupeodes corollae is provided by Marcos-Garcia (1981) and Barkemeyer (1994).
