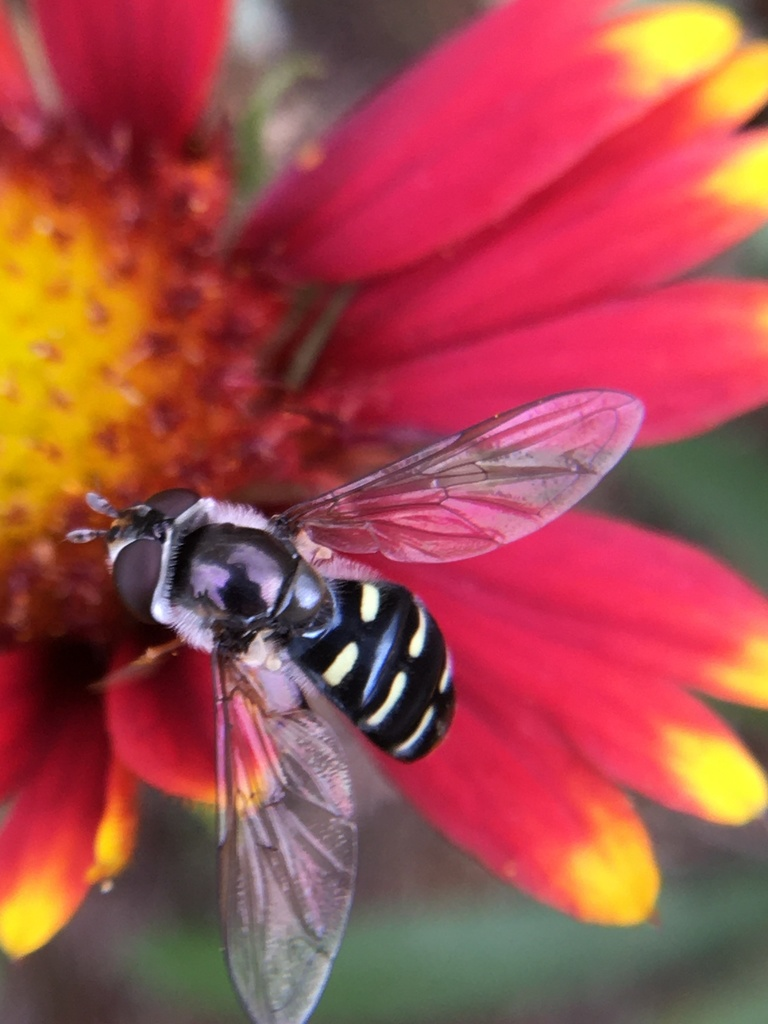

Scientific classification
- Kingdom: Animalia
- Phylum: Arthropoda
- Clade: Pancrustacea
- Class: Insecta
- Order: Diptera
- Family: Syrphidae
- Genus: Eupeodes
- Subgenus: Metasyrphus
- Species: E. perplexus

Binomial name
- Eupeodes perplexus (Osburn) 1910
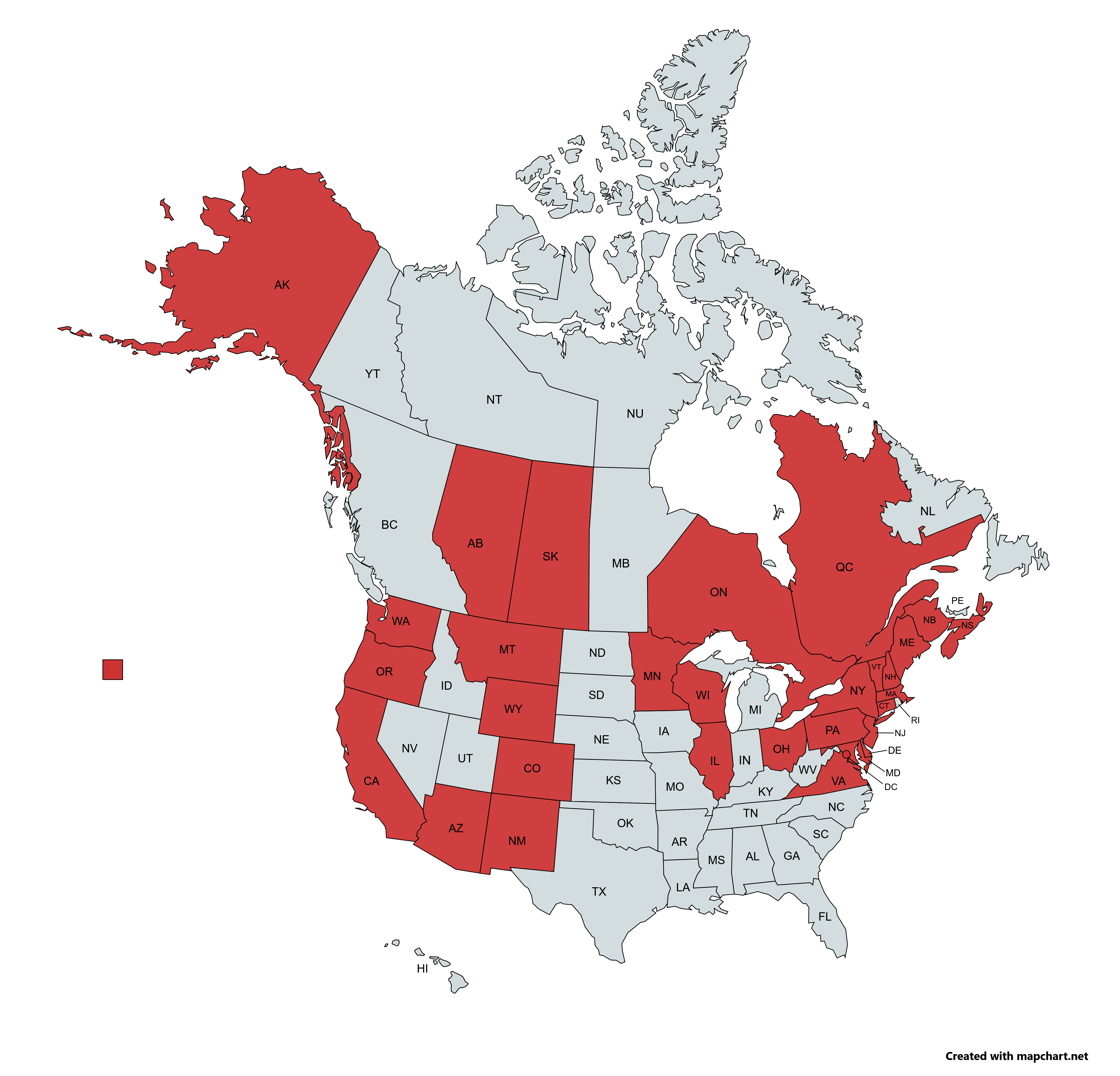

Synonyms
- Syrphus meadii Jones, 1917; Metasyrphus meadii Fluke 1933; Syrphus perplexus Osburn, 1910; Syrphus arcuatus

= Eupeodes perplexus =

Species of fly

Eupeodes perplexus, the bare-winged aphideater, is a species of hoverfly native to North America. Adults feed on nectar; larvae feed on aphids and scale insects.

== Description ==
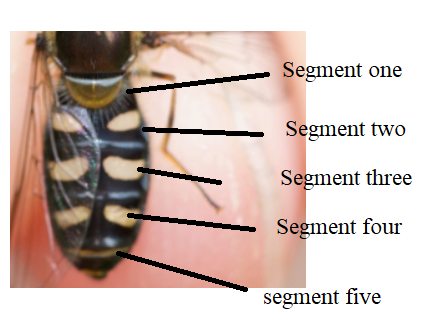
Close-up of abdomen

=== Head ===
The frons of both sexes not unusually puffed out. The third segment of antennae (flagellum) is exceptionally large. The pile of the face dominantly is pale, and the is head hemispherical; the face is slightly concave below antennae, tuberculate, whitish-yellow, with black cheeks and dark median vitta over tubercle; antennae short, third joint oval; dark crescent-shaped spot over base of each antenna; eyes bare.

=== Thorax ===
The metasternum and pleura are covered with white pile. The scutellum is raised, exposing the metanotum. The anterior anepisternum, meron, and metepisternum are bare. For males the pile of scutellum yellow or black or mixed, but in females the pile is mostly black.

=== Abdomen ===
The abdominal spots are yellow, finger-like wide, curved and interrupted in the middle. The first segment is very narrow and all black. The spots on the second segment do not reach the sides. In the females, abdominal bands are broader. The fifth segment is yellow, sometimes with a small median black spot. The spots on segments three and four are very slightly lunate with the posterior margins of fourth and fifth segments narrowly yellow.

=== Wings ===
The wings are hyaline. The third longitudinal vein (R4+5) is only slightly curved. The marginal cell (r1) is open with the anterior cross-vein (R-M) located near the base of discal cell. The stigma is thin, long and brown.

=== Legs ===
The legs are mainly pale reddish. The base of femora are black, with the hind femora black on the basal half or more.

== Distribution ==
The species has a Nearctic distribution across North America and Canada.

== Similar species ==
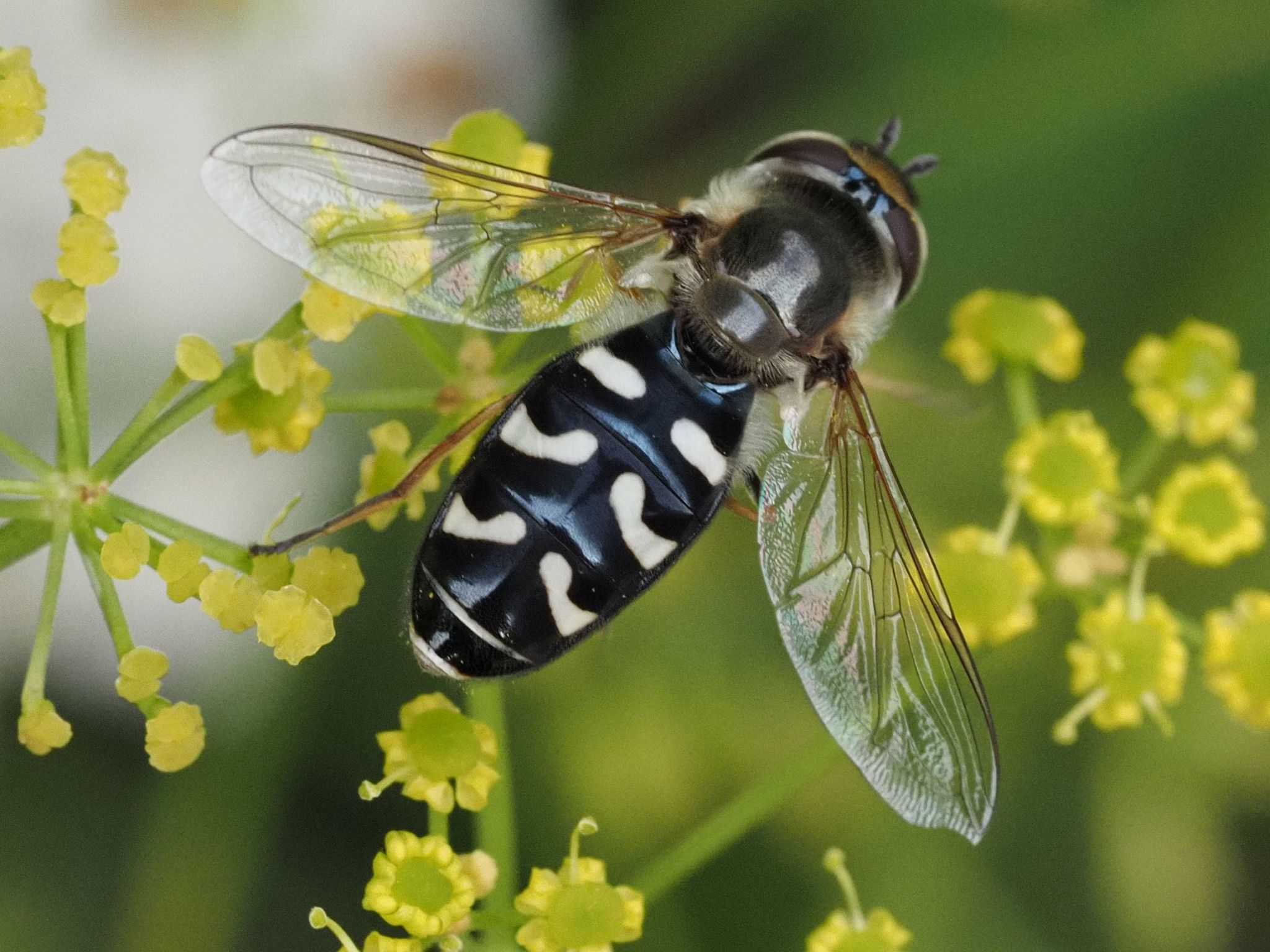
The similar species Scavea pyrastri

The similar Melangyna lasiophthalma can be distinguished from E.perplexus by the abdominal spots reaching the lateral margin of the abdomen, which they do not in E. perplexum. In Scaeva pyrastri, the third wing vein ( R4+5) has a long, moderately deep curvature, and the spots on the abdomen are more curved and slightly constricted in the middle.
