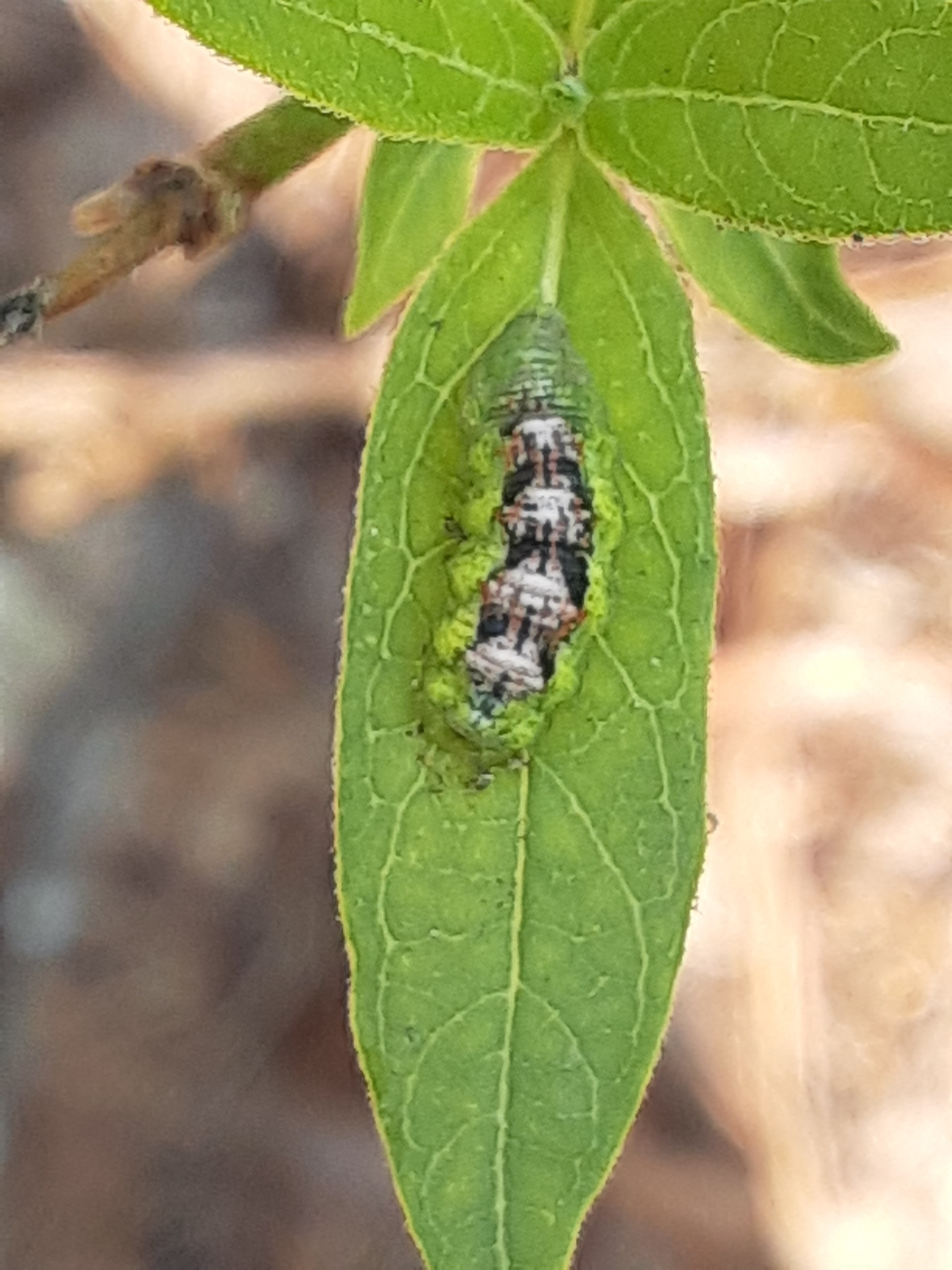
- Eupeodes pomus larva, Virginia

Scientific classification
- Kingdom: Animalia
- Phylum: Arthropoda
- Class: Insecta
- Order: Diptera
- Family: Syrphidae
- Genus: Eupeodes
- Species: E. pomus

Binomial name
- Eupeodes pomus (Curran, 1921)

Synonyms
- Syrphus pomus Curran, 1921; Syrphus vinelandi Curran, 1921

= Eupeodes pomus =

Species of hoverfly

Eupeodes pomus, the short-tailed aphideater, is a species of syrphid fly observed across North America. Hoverflies can remain nearly motionless in flight. The adults are also known as flower flies for they are commonly found on flowers from which they get both energy-giving nectar and protein-rich pollen. Larvae have been reported feeding from various aphids.
