= Eupeodes nielseni =

Scientific classification
- Kingdom: Animalia
- Phylum: Arthropoda
- Class: Insecta
- Order: Diptera
- Family: Syrphidae
- Genus: Eupeodes
- Species: E. nielseni

Binomial name
- Eupeodes nielseni (Dusek & Láska, 1976)

Species of insect

Eupeodes nielseni is a Palearctic hoverfly.

== Description ==
It resembles Eupeodes luniger and other Eupeodes. Determination is problematic. Key references are Haarto, A. & Kerppola, S. (2007) and Bartsch, H., Binkiewicz, E., Rådén, A. & Nasibov, E. (2009). The male terminalia are figured by Dusek and Laska (1976). The adult insect is illustrated in colour by Stubbs and Falk (1983) and Torp (1994). The larva is described and figured by Rotheray (1994).

It is found from Fennoscandia south to the Pyrenees and Alps and from Britain eastwards through Northern and Central Europe into European Russia in Pinus forest from May to August. The larvae feed on Pinus aphids.
