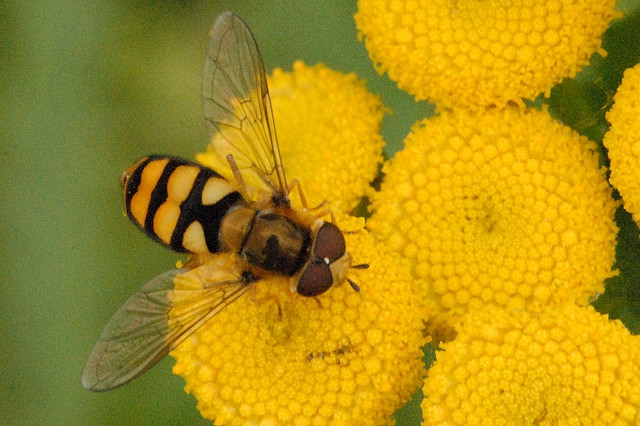
- Eupeodes latifasciatus male

Scientific classification
- Kingdom: Animalia
- Phylum: Arthropoda
- Class: Insecta
- Order: Diptera
- Family: Syrphidae
- Genus: Eupeodes
- Subgenus: Metasyrphus
- Species: E. latifasciatus

Binomial name
- Eupeodes latifasciatus (Macquart, 1829)

Synonyms
- Syrphus latifasciatus Macquart, 1829

= Eupeodes latifasciatus =

Species of fly

Eupeodes latifasciatus is a species of hoverfly. Adults feed on nectar; larvae feed on aphids and scale insects.

== Description ==
Wing length 6·5-8 ·5 mm. Male:Yellow spots of tergites 3 and 4 connected. Front margin of yellow spots almost straight, parallel with front margin of tergite. Scutellum mainly yellow haired on disc. Female: No frontal dust spots, frons entirely shiny. Lateral margins of tergite 5 yellow. Yellow spots of tergites 3 and 4 joined as bands reaching lateral margins. The male genitalia are figured by Dusek and Laska (1976). The larva is described by Dusek & Laska (1960).

== Distribution ==
Palaearctic Fennoscandia South to Iberia and the Mediterranean basin. Turkey, Ireland eastwards through Europe to European Russia, the Russian Far East, Siberia to the Pacific coast (Sakhalin and Kuril Isles), India, Nearctic from Alaska south to California and Texas.

== Biology ==
Habitat: Wetland and open ground; fen, humid, grassland, and along streams in open country, unsown fallow land. Flowers visited include white umbellifers, Caltha, Convolvulus, Euphorbia, Prunus padus, Ranunculus, Salix repens, Taraxacum, Tussilago, Ulex. The flight period is May to September (April to October in southern Europe).
