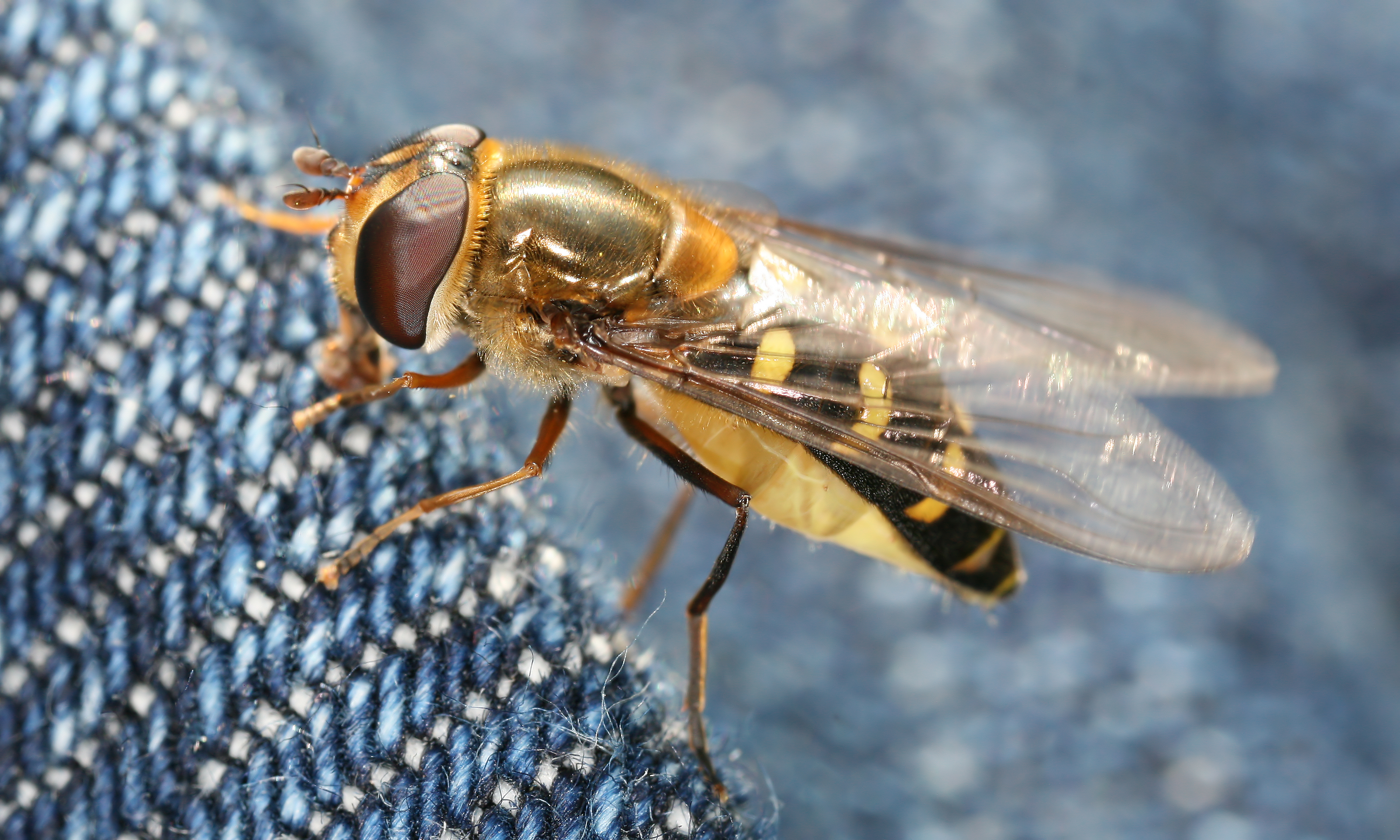

Scientific classification
- Kingdom: Animalia
- Phylum: Arthropoda
- Class: Insecta
- Order: Diptera
- Family: Syrphidae
- Genus: Lapposyrphus
- Species: L. lapponicus

Binomial name
- Lapposyrphus lapponicus Zetterstedt, 1838

Synonyms
- Scaeva lapponica Zetterstedt, 1838; Eupeodes lapponicus (Zetterstedt, 1838); Metasyrphus lapponicus (Zetterstedt, 1838); Syrphus alcidice Walker, 1849; Syrphus arcucinctus Walker, 1849; Syrphus marginatus Jones, 1917; Epistrophe mediaconstrictus Fluke, 1930; Syrphus bipunctatus Girschner, 1884; Catabomba komabensis Matsumura, 1917; Syrphus agnon Walker, 1849; Syrphus sibericus Kanervo, 1938

= Lapposyrphus lapponicus =

Species of hover fly

Lapposyrphus lapponicus (Zetterstedt, 1838), the common loopwing aphideater (in North America) or Lapland syrphid fly (in Europe), is a common species of syrphid fly observed across the Northern Hemisphere. The adults are commonly found on flowers from which they get both energy-giving nectar and protein rich pollen. Larvae feed on aphids.
