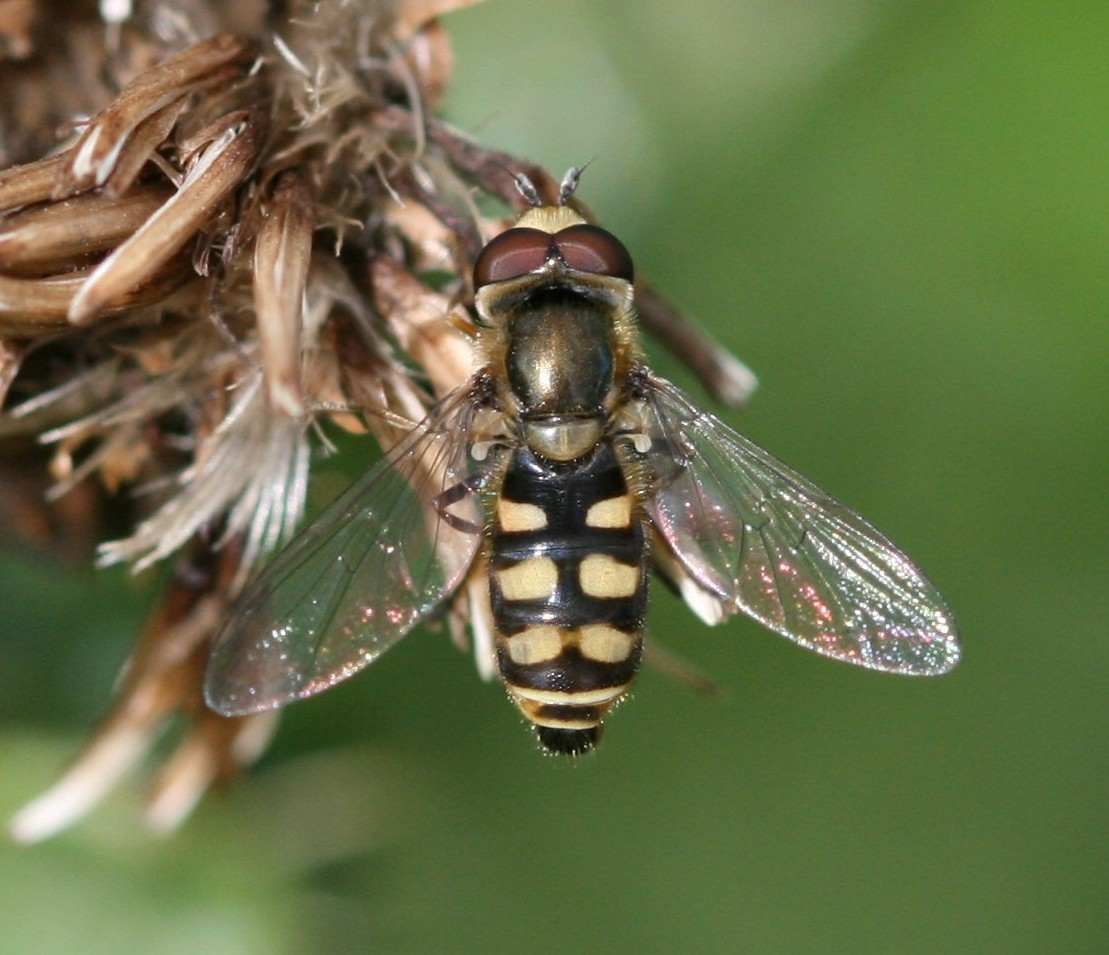
- male
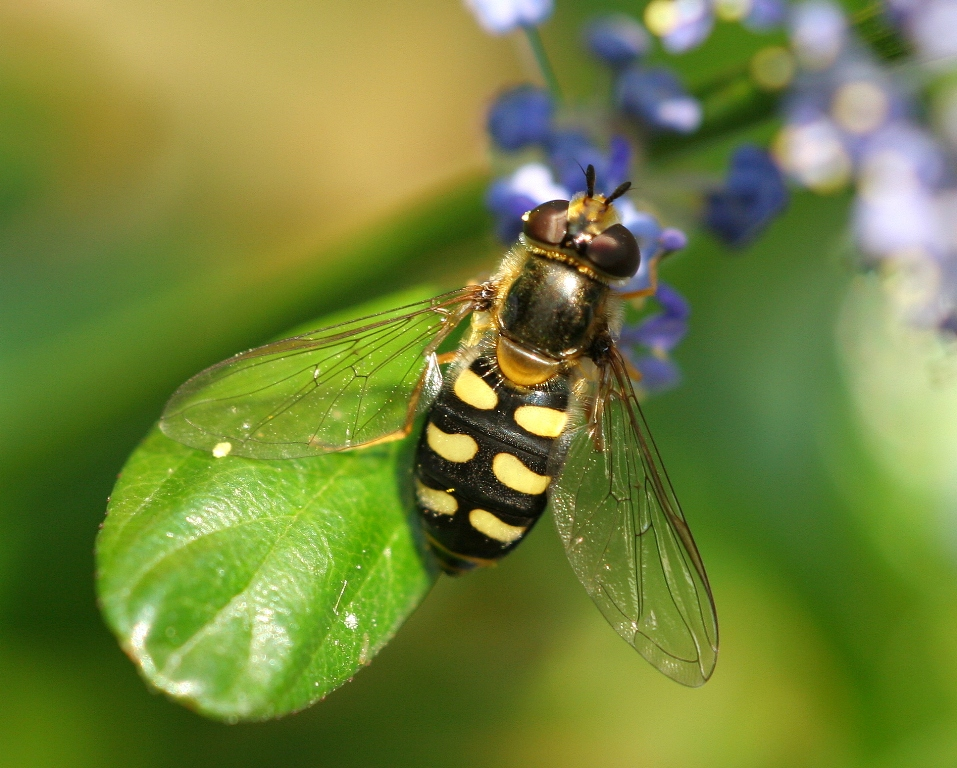
- female

Scientific classification
- Kingdom: Animalia
- Phylum: Arthropoda
- Class: Insecta
- Order: Diptera
- Family: Syrphidae
- Genus: Eupeodes
- Subgenus: Eupeodes
- Species: E. luniger

Binomial name
- Eupeodes luniger (Meigen, 1822)

Synonyms
- Syrphus luniger Meigen, 1822

= Eupeodes luniger =

Species of fly

Eupeodes luniger is a common species of hoverfly.

It is characterized by hook-shaped markings along the center of its abdomen.

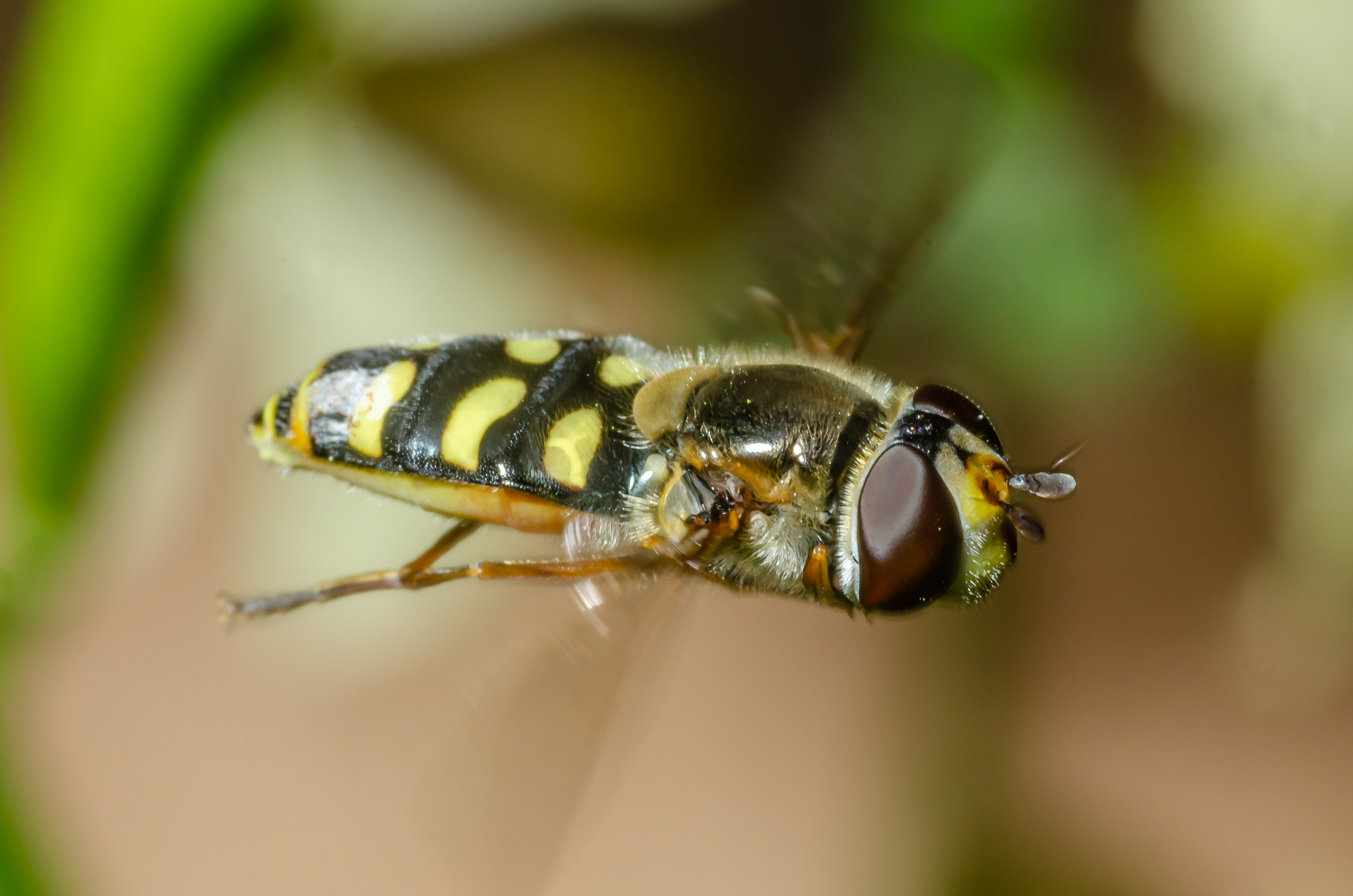
Female in flight

== Description ==
External images For terms see Morphology of Diptera
Wing length 7·5-8·5 mm. Male: postocular orbit less than 0.5 of its maximal width near vertex. Female: frons with white dust spots, the undusted area extending as a black Y- shape into the yellow part. Tergite 5 with yellow side margin. The male genitalia are figured by Dusek and Laska (1973). The larva is illustrated by Rotheray (1993)

== Distribution ==
Palaearctic from Fennoscandia South to Iberia and the Mediterranean basin. Ireland East through Europe into Asia Minor. European Russia, the Russian Far East and Siberia to the Pacific coast (Kuril Isles). Japan. North India. A highly migratory species .

== Biology ==
Habitat: Open ground, dune grassland, grassland and forest, woodland clearings and tracks, farmland and orchards, suburban gardens. Up to 2,000m in the Alps. Flowers visited include white Umbelliferae, Calluna, Leontodon, Malus sylvestris, Polygonum cuspidatum, Prunus spinosa, Ranunculus, Rosa rugosa, Senecio, Taraxacum. The flight period is April to November (earlier in South Europe). The larva feeds on aphids. Barkemeyer (1994) details the biology of E. luniger
