= 1840 in birding and ornithology =

- Years in birding and ornithology: 1837 1838 1839 1840 1841 1842 1843
- Centuries: 18th century · 19th century · 20th century
- Decades: 1810s 1820s 1830s 1840s 1850s 1860s 1870s
- Years: 1837 1838 1839 1840 1841 1842 1843

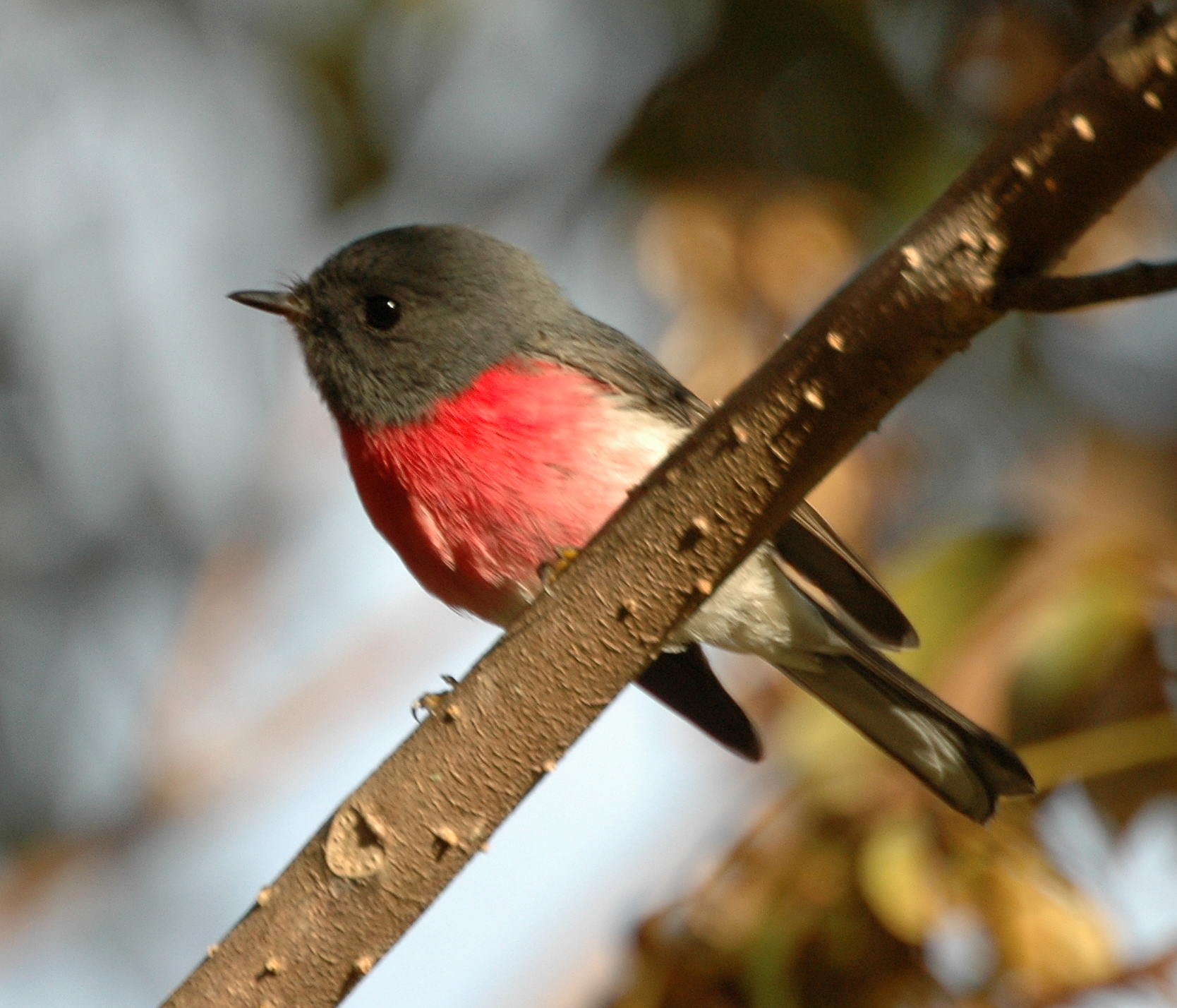
The rose robin was described in 1840 by John Gould

- Gustav Hartlaub begins a world bird collection
- Death of Constantine Samuel Rafinesque
- Death of Charles Fothergill
- Death of Nicholas Aylward Vigors
- Abel Aubert du Petit-Thouars Voyage autour du monde sur la frégate La Vénus pendant les années 1836-1839 (10 volumes, 1840–1864) The birds in this work were illustrated by Paul Louis Oudart (1796–1860)Capitaine : Abel Aubert du Petit-Thouars (1793–1864), Ingénieur hydrographe : Urbain Dortet de Tessan (1804–1879), Médecin-naturaliste : Adolphe-Simon Neboux (1806–1844), Chirurgien : Charles René Augustin Léclancher (1804–1857)
- William Thompson presents a list of the birds of Ireland to the British Association for the Advancement of Science
- Johann Jakob Kaup becomes Inspector of the Grand Ducal museum in Darmstadt
- Luigi Benoit Ornitologia siciliana : o sia catalogo ragionato degli uccelli che si trovano in Sicilia Messina: Giuseppe Fiumara, 1840. online BHL
- Alexander Keyserling and Johann Heinrich Blasius publish Die Wirbelthiere Europa's (Vertebrates of Europe)

Ongoing events

- William Jardine and Prideaux John Selby with the co-operation of James Ebenezer Bicheno Illustrations of ornithology various publishers (Four volumes) 1825 and [1836–43]. Although issued partly in connection with the volume of plates, under the same title (at the time of issue), text and plates were purchasable separately and the publishers ... express the hope, also voiced by the author in his preface to the present work, that the text will constitute an independent work of reference. Vol. I was issued originally in 1825 [by A. Constable, Edinburgh], with nomenclature according to Temminck
