= 1839 in birding and ornithology =

- Years in birding and ornithology: 1836 1837 1838 1839 1840 1841 1842
- Centuries: 18th century · 19th century · 20th century
- Decades: 1800s 1810s 1820s 1830s 1840s 1850s 1860s
- Years: 1836 1837 1838 1839 1840 1841 1842

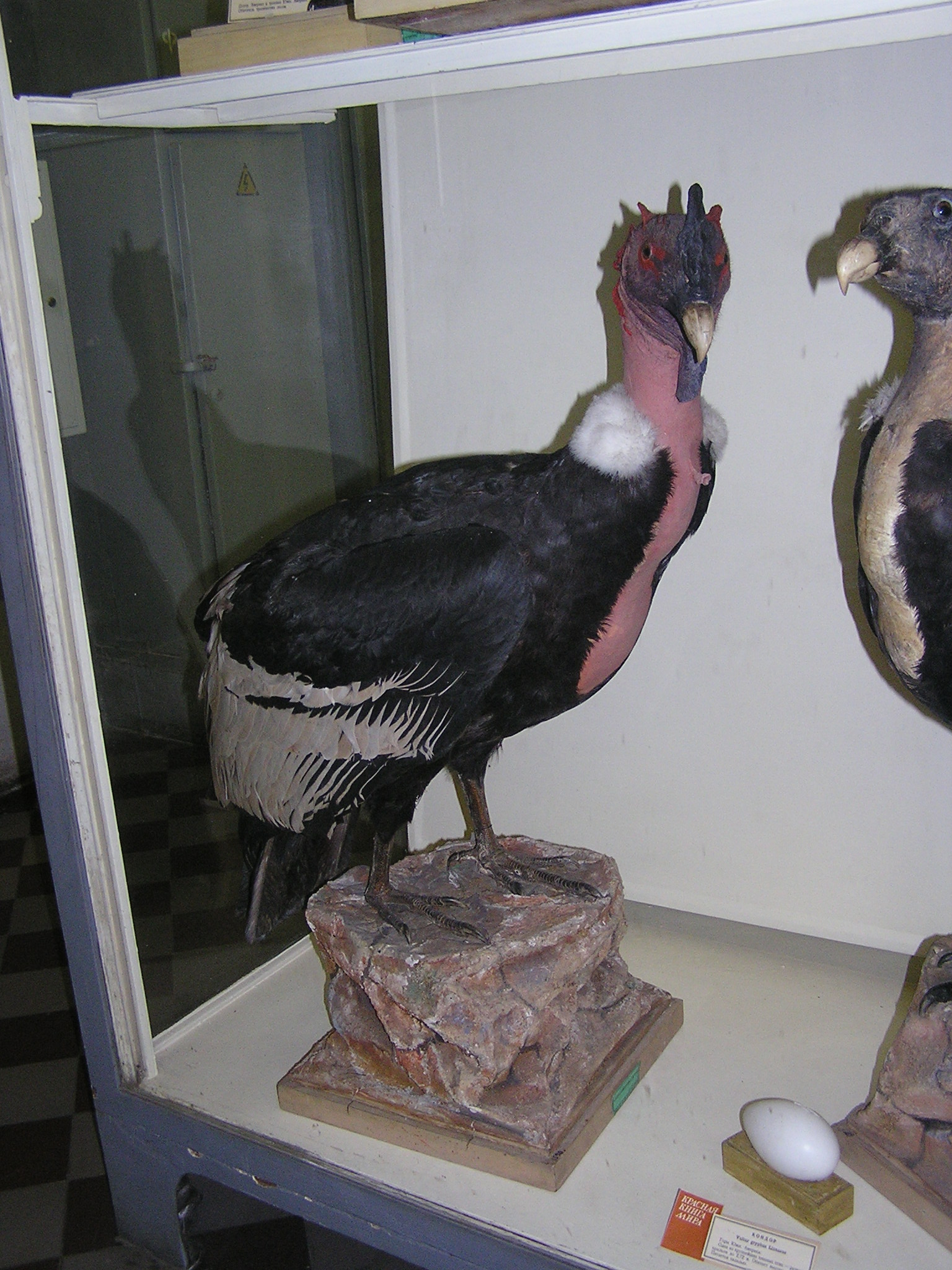
The Andean condor is in the Family Cathartidae established by Frédéric de Lafresnaye in 1839

- Alcide d'Orbigny describes the Cuban pygmy owl in Ramón de la Sagra's monumental Historia física, política y natural de la isla de Cuba
- 1839-1840 Christian Ferdinand Friedrich Krauss, Johan August Wahlberg and Adulphe Delegorgue fr:Adulphe Delegorgue explore Natal
- Juan Gundlach leaves Europe for Cuba
- 1839-1843 James Clark Ross expedition to Antarctica
- Frédéric de Lafresnaye describes the spot-crowned woodcreeper in Revue Zoologique, par la Société Cuvierienne (Paris), René Primevère Lesson contributes the description of the black-headed honeyeater to the same journal
- Costa's hummingbird named to honour Louis Marie Pantaleon Costa.
- Foundation of Musée d'histoire naturelle de Mons
- Foundation of Museum d’Histoire Naturelle Aix en Provence

Ongoing events

- William Jardine and Prideaux John Selby with the co-operation of James Ebenezer Bicheno Illustrations of ornithology various publishers (Four volumes) 1825 and [1836–43]. Although issued partly in connection with the volume of plates, under the same title (at the time of issue), text and plates were purchasable separately and the publishers ... express the hope, also voiced by the author in his preface to the present work, that the text will constitute an independent work of reference. Vol. I was issued originally in 1825 [by A. Constable, Edinburgh], with nomenclature according to Temminck
