= 1843 in birding and ornithology =

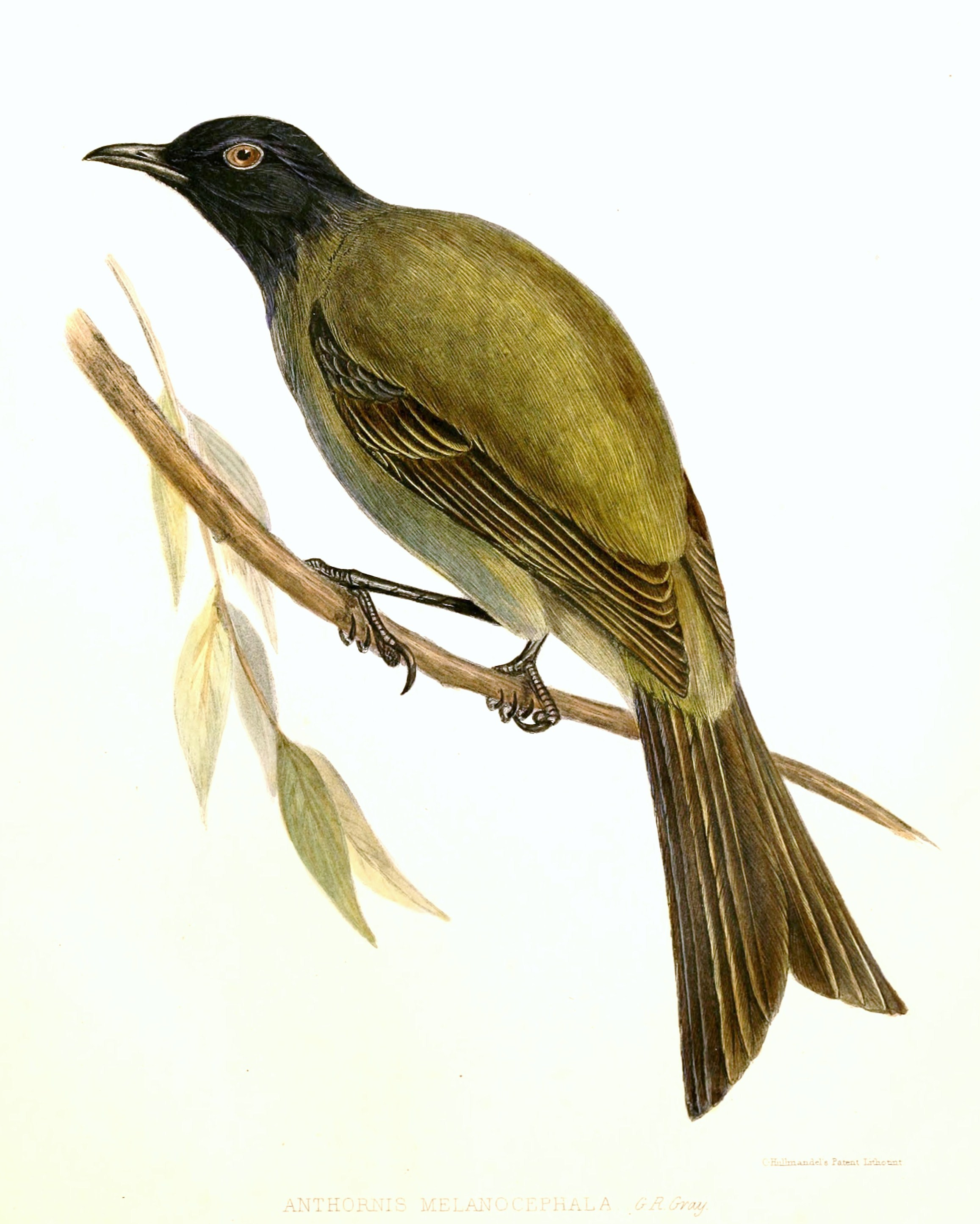
The Chatham Island bellbird was described by John Edward Gray in 1843

- Heinrich Gätke begins to study birds on Heligoland
- Louis Hippolyte Bouteille publishes Ornithologie du Dauphiné ou description des oiseaux observés dans les départements de l'Isère, de la Drôme, des Hautes Alpes et les contrées voisines.
- Isaac Sprague serves as an assistant to John James Audubon on an ornithological expedition up the Missouri River
- John Cotton begins work on his Birds of the Port Phillip District of New South Wales
- William Yarrell publishes The History of British Birds
- Edward Hearle Rodd begins a record of the birds of the Scilly Isles
- Johann Jakob von Tschudi describes the Peruvian booby in Archiv für Naturgeschichte. Berlin
- Antonio Schembri publishes Catalogo Ornitologico del Gruppo di Malta
- Antwerp Zoo established
- Tasmanian Society Museum founded

Ongoing events

- William Jardine and Prideaux John Selby with the co-operation of James Ebenezer Bicheno Illustrations of ornithology various publishers (Four volumes) 1825 and [1836–43]. Although issued partly in connection with the volume of plates, under the same title (at the time of issue), text and plates were purchasable separately and the publishers ... express the hope, also voiced by the author in his preface to the present work, that the text will constitute an independent work of reference. Vol. I was issued originally in 1825 [by A. Constable, Edinburgh], with nomenclature according to Temminck
