= Bicheno (disambiguation) =

Bicheno may refer to:

- Bicheno, Tasmania, a town in Australia
- Bicheno's finch (Taeniopygia bichenovii), a bird indigenous to Australia
- Hugh Bicheno, a British-American military historian
- James Ebenezer Bicheno, a British Colonial Secretary for Van Diemen's Land 1843–1851.
- James Bicheno Francis, a British-American engineer
