= 1836 in birding and ornithology =

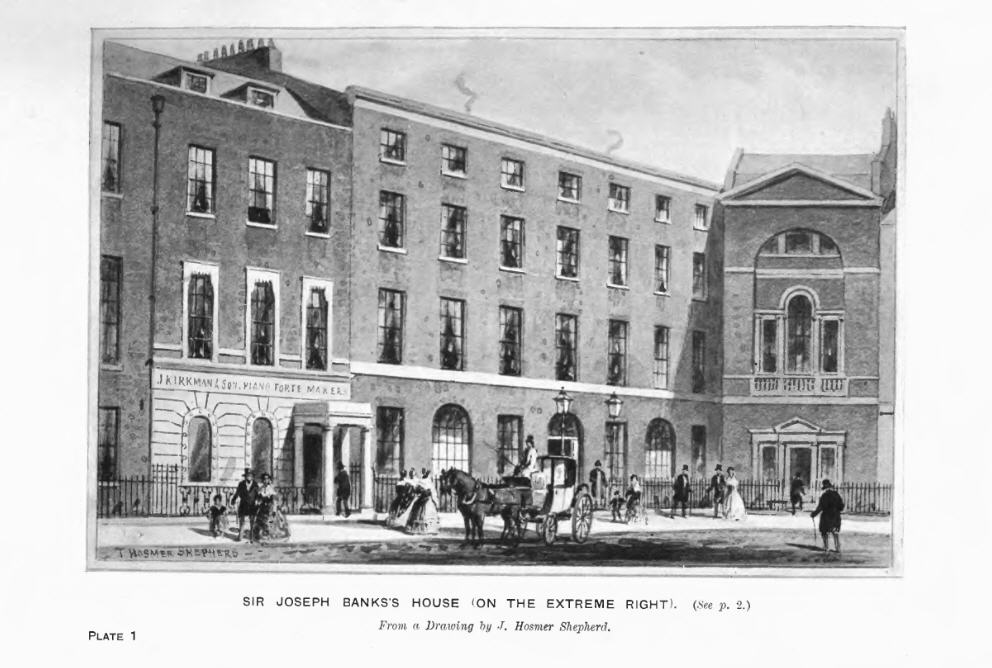
House of Joseph Banks and office of the Zoological Society of London

- John Gould formally describes the now extinct Norfolk kākā.
- Thomas C. Jerdon, who was the first European to describe many birds of the Indian subcontinent, first arrives in Madras.
- Andrew Smith describes new birds in Report of the Expedition for Exploring Central Africa. Some are the African pygmy falcon, the red-billed buffalo weaver, the white-browed sparrow weaver the southern white-crowned shrike, the Kalahari scrub robin and the great sparrow
- Death of Bernhard Meyer
- Death of Edward Turner Bennett
- Adolphe-Simon Neboux joins the French exploration ship La Venus as surgeon naturalist
- William Yarrell becomes secretary of the Zoological Society of London

Ongoing events

- John Gould Proceedings of the Zoological Society of London 1836 New birds described by Gould in this journal in 1836 include the blue-billed duck, the black currawong, the white-eared bulbul, the greater necklaced laughingthrush, the black-headed trogon and the black-breasted parrotbill
- William Jardine and Prideaux John Selby with the co-operation of James Ebenezer Bicheno Illustrations of Ornithology various publishers (Four volumes) 1825 and [1836–43]. Although issued partly in connection with the volume of plates, under the same title (at the time of issue), text and plates were purchasable separately and the publishers ... express the hope, also voiced by the author in his preface to the present work, that the text will constitute an independent work of reference. Vol. I was issued originally in 1825 [by A. Constable, Edinburgh], with nomenclature according to Temminck
