= 1842 in birding and ornithology =

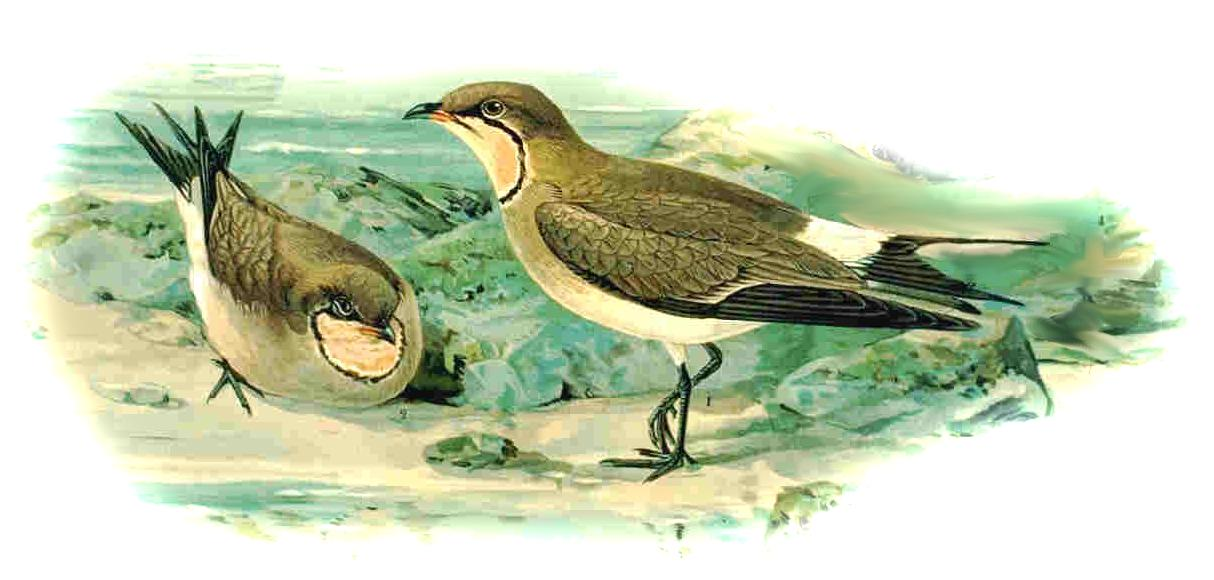
The black-winged pratincole was described by Johann Fischer von Waldheim in 1842

- John MacGillivray sails as naturalist on board HMS Fly, despatched to survey the Torres Strait, New Guinea.
- Lovell Augustus Reeve is elected as an associate of the Linnean Society of London and begins trading as a natural history dealer.
- The first volume of Christian Ludwig Brehm's compendium on the natural history of parrots is published.
- Death of Robert Mudie
- Jules Verreaux travels to Australia to collect for the dealership "Maison Verreaux"
- Martin Lichtenstein first describes the southern yellow-billed hornbill (as Buceros leucomelas) in an auction catalogue.
- Florent Prévost and Marc Athanese Parfait Oeillet Des Murs describe the undulated antpitta.
- Hugh Edwin Strickland draws up the report of a committee appointed by the British Association to consider the rules of zoological nomenclature. This document established the Principle of Priority in zoology.
- Gaetano Cara publishes his checklist on the birds of Sardinia.
- John Cassin becomes curator of the Philadelphia Academy of Natural Sciences.
- John Gould describes several birds in his ongoing work, The Birds of Australia. Species Gould described in 1842 include the green pygmy goose, the painted finch, the torrent duck, the letter-winged kite and the welcome swallow.

Ongoing events

- William Jardine and Prideaux John Selby, with the co-operation of James Ebenezer Bicheno, publish Illustrations of ornithology under various publishers (Four volumes) in 1825 and from 1836 – 1843.
