= 1841 in birding and ornithology =

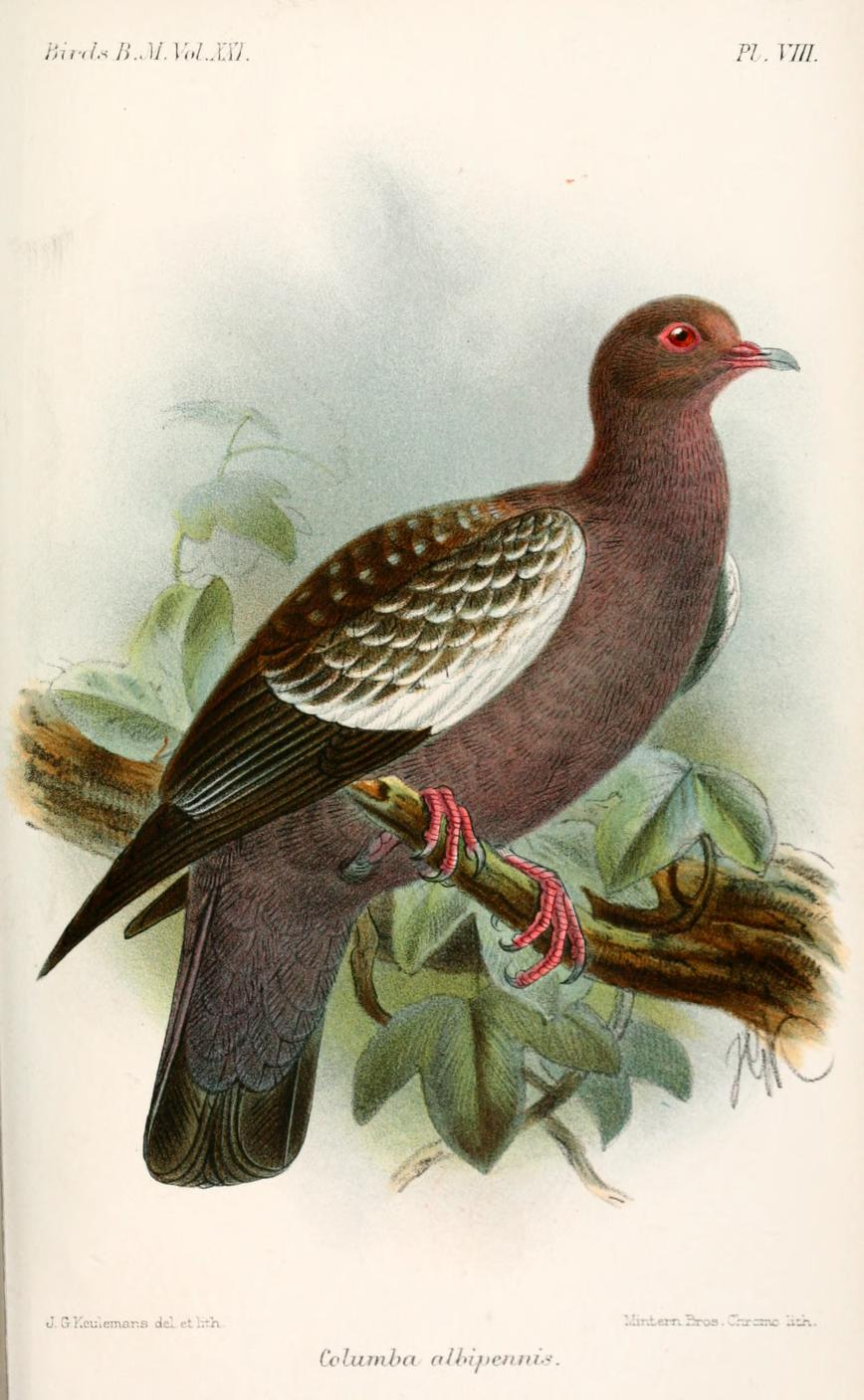
White-quilled rock-pigeon described by John Gould in The Birds of Australia in 1841

- Jacques Bernard Hombron and Honoré Jacquinot describe the Auckland Islands merganser
- Death of Jean Victoire Audouin
- Death of Joseph Fortuné Théodore Eydoux
- Edward Blyth takes the position of curator at the museum of the Asiatic Society of Bengal
- Elizabeth Gould completes the bird illustrations for Zoology of the Voyage of H.M.S. Beagle
- Isidore Geoffroy Saint-Hilaire becomes a professor (birds and mammals) at Muséum national d'histoire naturelle
- Salomon Müller and Hermann Schlegel describe the lesser fish eagle in Verhandelingen over de Natuurlijke Geschiedenis der Nederlandsch Overzeesche Bezittingen door de leden natuurkundige commissie in Indie andere Schrijvers. Uitgegeven op last van den Koning.
- Thomas Richard Heywood Thomson expedition to Niger. Thomson, an ornithologist, was accompanied by Louis Fraser.
- Heinrich Gätke, German ornithologist and artist, moves to Heligoland as secretary to the British Governor and begins a long study of the birds there.
- Karl Friedrich Wilhelm Berge publishes Die Fortpflanzung europäischer und aussereuropäischer Vögel. Ein Beitrag zur Naturgeschichte derselben (Stuttgart, L.F. Rieger, 1840–1841).

Ongoing events

- The Birds of Australia birds first described in this work in 1841 include the rock parrot, the topknot pigeon, the red-backed kingfisher, the red-browed treecreeper, the white-quilled rock pigeon, the little curlew and the black stilt
- William Jardine and Prideaux John Selby with the co-operation of James Ebenezer Bicheno Illustrations of ornithology various publishers (Four volumes) 1825 and [1836–43]. Although issued partly in connection with the volume of plates, under the same title (at the time of issue), text and plates were purchasable separately and the publishers ... express the hope, also voiced by the author in his preface to the present work, that the text will constitute an independent work of reference. Vol. I was issued originally in 1825 [by A. Constable, Edinburgh], with nomenclature according to Temminck
