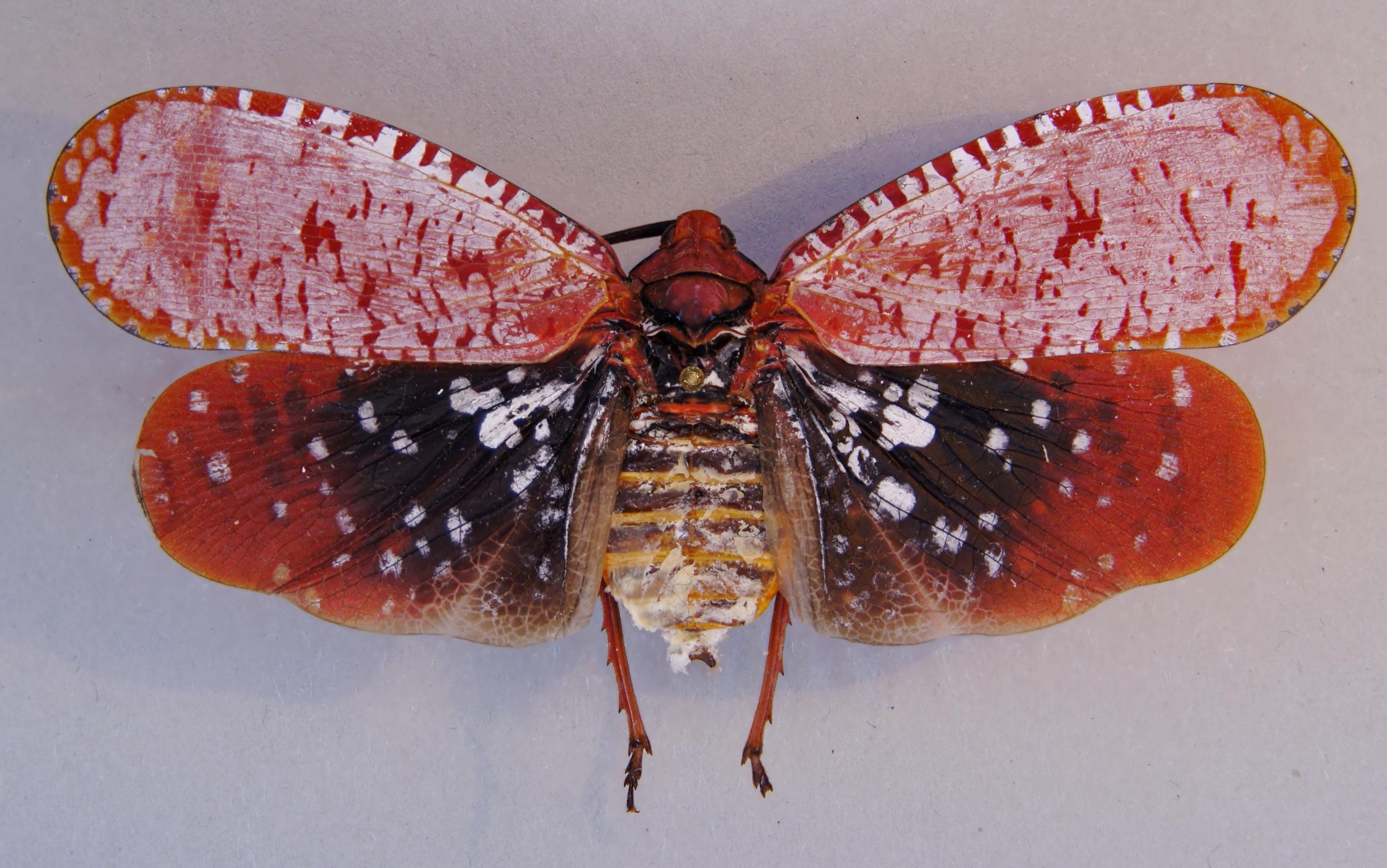
- Aphaena submaculata consanguinea

Scientific classification
- Domain: Eukaryota
- Kingdom: Animalia
- Phylum: Arthropoda
- Class: Insecta
- Order: Hemiptera
- Suborder: Auchenorrhyncha
- Infraorder: Fulgoromorpha
- Family: Fulgoridae
- Tribe: Aphaenini
- Genus: Aphaena
- Species: A. submaculata

Binomial name
- Aphaena submaculata (Duncan, 1843)

Subspecies
- See text
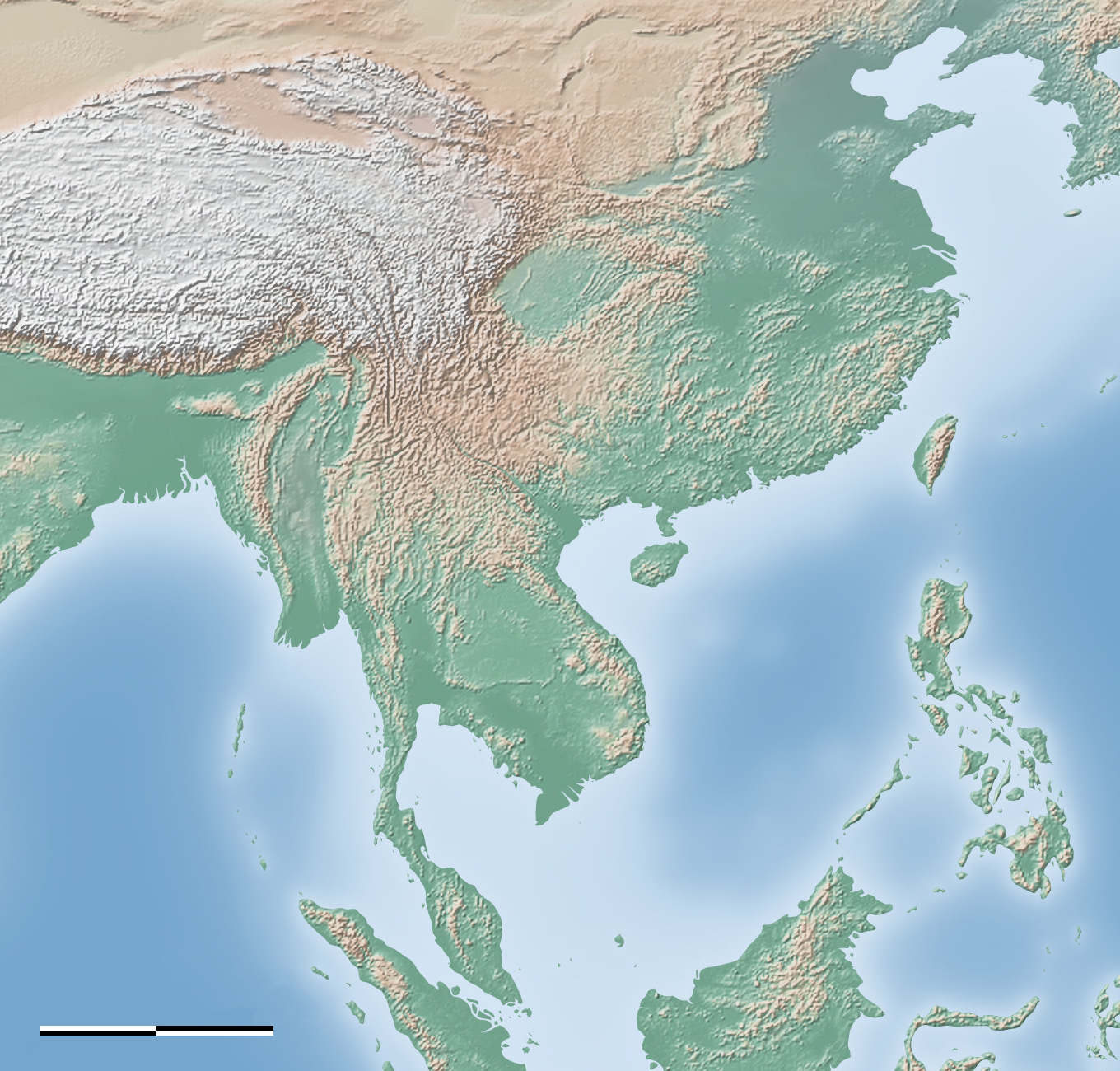

Synonyms
- Aphaena resima (Stål 1855); Aphana resima Stål 1855; Aphana submaculata Hope 1840; Euphria resima (Stål 1855); Euphria submaculata (Duncan 1843)

= Aphaena submaculata =

Species of insect

Aphaena submaculata is a species of planthoppers in the sub-family Aphaeninae of Fulgoridae. Various subspecies are distributed throughout the Indo-China region. The species was first observed by Frederick William Hope in 1840 and was formally described by James Duncan in 1843. Since then, it has undergone multiple reclassifications and now has 3 recognized subspecies which differ by color and/or length. The species feeds on tree sap via specialized mouthparts and follows a hemimetabolous life cycle.

== Taxonomy and discovery ==
Aphaena submaculata is a species of fulgoridea planthopper. The earliest account of the species comes from 1840 when entomologist Frederick William Hope described the species as Aphana submaculata, a nomen nudum. Aphaena submaculata was formally described by James Duncan in 1843. In Duncan's 1843 account, he referred to the species as Aphana submaculata as well. In 1851, Francis Walker proposed the alternative spelling Aphaena submaculata. In 1863, Carl Stål reclassified the species as Euphria submaculata.

Around the same time as Duncan's discovery, Carl Stål described Aphana resima as a separate species in 1855. In 1858, Francis Walker reclassified Aphana resima to the alternative spelling Aphaena resima. In 1895, Carl Eduard Adolph Gerstaecker reclassified the species again as Euphria resima. In 1906, William Distant determined that Euphria resima was synonymous with Euphria submaculata, which downgraded Euphria resima to a synonym. Distant identified 2 additional subspecies: Aphaena (Aphaena) submaculata subsp. burmanica and Aphaena (Aphaena) submaculata subsp. consanguinea. This reclassification was upheld upon review by Victor Lallemand in 1963. In 1947, Robert L. Metcalf reclassified the species one final time as Aphaena (Aphaena) submaculata, its currently accepted name. A. submaculata, alongside other members of the Fulgoridae family, are referred to colloquially as "lanternflies".

There are currently 3 recognized subspecies of Aphaena (Aphaena) submaculata:

- Aphaena (Aphaena) submaculata subsp. burmanica (Distant, 1906)
- Aphaena (Aphaena) submaculata subsp. consanguinea (Distant, 1906)
- Aphaena (Aphaena) submaculata subsp. resima (Stål, 1855)

== Description ==
=== Aphaena (Aphaena) submaculata ===
Distant, in his 1906 description of Aphaena (Aphaena) submaculata, stated the head, upper thorax, and legs are a yellow-brown (ochraceous) color. The lateral margins of the pronotum are black and the abdomen is made of ochraceous and black segmental margins, with a color described as similar to pitch. The abdomen is covered by brick-red color forewings and light spots, and the taris are also a black color. The tibiae are a greenish color, the tegmina are a dull red color and covered in light spots. The costal tegmina have regular, light spots, while the apical area is covered in darker spots. The underside of the tegmina are a bright red, with pale, white spots. At the wing's costal area, there are also a series of blue-black spots and the wings turn to a black color as they approach the abdomen. The anal and posterior regions have a series of scattered spots. The mesonotum has three ridges. Excluding the tegmen, A. submaculata is 20 millimetres (0.79 in) to 22 millimetres (0.87 in) in length, and with the tegmen the length is 65 millimetres (2.6 in) to 76 millimetres (3.0 in).

=== Aphaena submaculata consanguinea ===
The subspecies Aphaena submaculata consanguinea differs from A. submaculata in that its tegmina lack spots, instead it has dark red, irregular transverse fasciae which are notably narrower than Aphaena (Aphaena) submaculata. The subspecies also lacks blue-black spots along its costal areas and its wings only present black coloration on the basal fourth, the anterior tibiae, and the tarsi. Excluding the tegmen, their length is 15.5 millimetres (0.61 in) to 20.5 millimetres (0.81 in), and with the tegmen, it is 52 millimetres (2.0 in) to 70 millimetres (2.8 in). This subspecies is slightly smaller than A. submaculata. Distant described the subspecies as "difficult to discern, and individual judgments as to the separation of species must frequently be formed".

=== Aphaena submaculata burmanica ===
The body and legs are an ochraceous color with the sides of the head and legs having a red color. The top of the rostrum, lateral margins of pronotum, the anterior tibiae, the top of the intermediate and posterior tibiae, and the entire tarsi are all black. The abdomen is covered with light spots, and the tegmina are a rose-red color with the margin covered in spots. The costal margin's spots are linearly designed while the outer margin is irregularly spotted. The wings are a deeper red compared to the tegmina and the tips of the wings have an ochraceous color. The tip of the anus is covered in large scattered spots. The mesonotum has a set of three ridges and the cephalic process extends from the bottom of the abdomen to the middle of the pronotum. Its size is comparable to A. submaculata; their length is 21 millimetres (0.83 in) and with the tegmen, 72 millimetres (2.8 in).

== Behavior and distribution ==
A. submaculata uses specialized mouthparts to pierce plants, feeding on tree sap. It has been observed feeding with Lycorma imperialis. The species follows a hemimetabolous life cycle and is native to Bangladesh, Myanmar, and Vietnam. Additionally, it is native to the Sikkim, Assam, and Darjeeling areas in India.
