= 1838 in birding and ornithology =

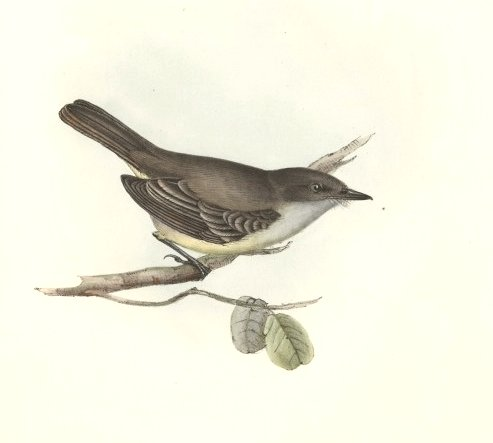
Galapagos flycatcher described by John Gould in Zoology of the Voyage of the H.M.S. Beagle

- The genus Zenaida named, commemorating Zénaïde Laetitia Julie Bonaparte
- Andrew Smith begins publication of Illustrations of the Zoology of South Africa (1838–50)
- Antoine Laurent Apollinaire Fée publishes Entretiens sur la zoologie. Oiseaux in the Bibliothèque d'instruction populaire.
- Death of Johann Gottlieb Fleischer
- Death of Anselme Gaëtan Desmarest
- Foundation of Royal Zoological Museum of Amsterdam
- Foundation of Museo Civico di Storia Naturale di Milano
- John Gould and his wife Elizabeth travel to Australia to work on The Birds of Australia. They are accompanied by John Gilbert.
- Death of Friedrich Wilhelm Ludwig Suckow
- James Edward Alexander publishes Expedition of discovery into the interior of Africa : Through the Hitherto Undescribed Countries of the Great Namaquas, Boschmans, and Hill Damaras, Performed under the Auspices of Her Majesty's Government and the Royal Geographical Society. 2 vols. – London : Henry Colburn, 1838. Waterhouse describes the bird species collected and two new species, the short-toed rock thrush and the white-tailed shrike.
- Thomas Campbell Eyton publishes A Monograph on the Anatidae, Or Duck Tribe

Ongoing events

- William Jardine and Prideaux John Selby with the co-operation of James Ebenezer Bicheno Illustrations of ornithology various publishers (Four volumes) 1825 and [1836–43]. Although issued partly in connection with the volume of plates, under the same title (at the time of issue), text and plates were purchasable separately and the publishers ... express the hope, also voiced by the author in his preface to the present work, that the text will constitute an independent work of reference. Vol. I was issued originally in 1825 [by A. Constable, Edinburgh], with nomenclature according to Temminck
