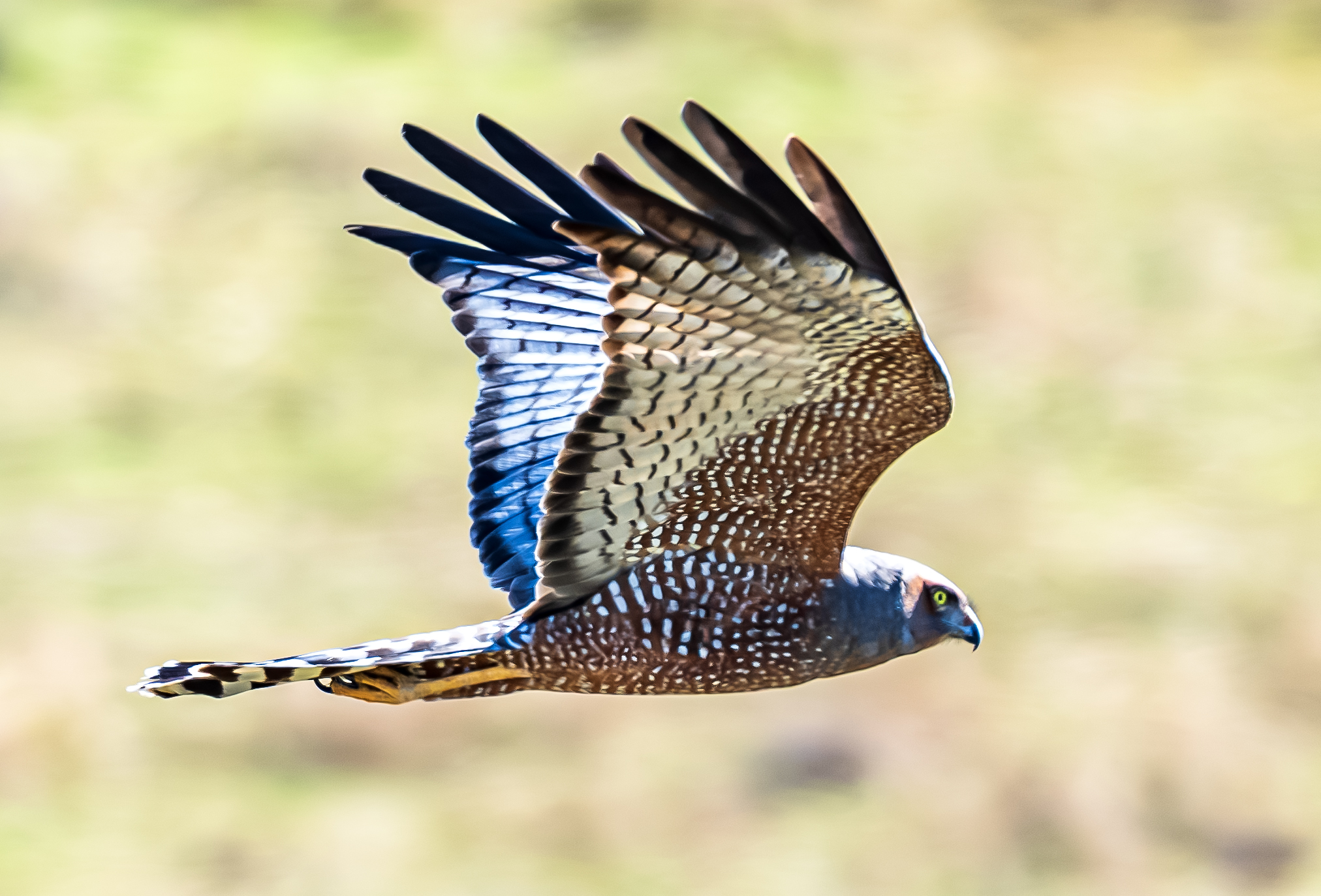

Conservation status
- Least Concern (IUCN 3.1)

Scientific classification
- Kingdom: Animalia
- Phylum: Chordata
- Class: Aves
- Order: Accipitriformes
- Family: Accipitridae
- Genus: Circus
- Species: C. assimilis

Binomial name
- Circus assimilis Jardine & Selby, 1828
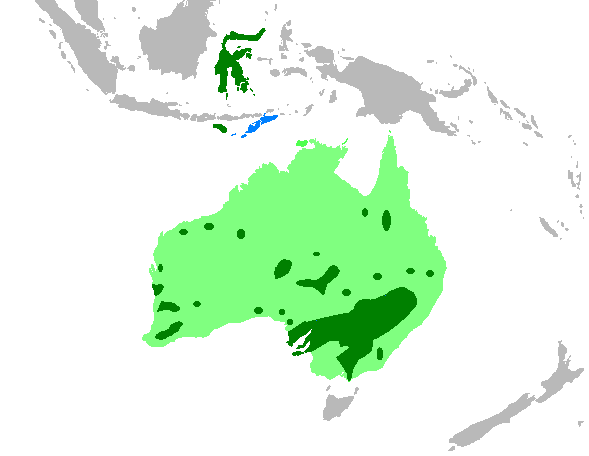
- range strongholds year-round distribution non-breeding distribution

= Spotted harrier =

Species of bird

The spotted harrier (Circus assimilis) also known as the smoke hawk, is a large Australasian bird of prey belonging to the family Accipitridae.

== Taxonomy ==
The spotted harrier belongs to the family Accipitridae. Accipitridae is the largest family in the order Accipitriformes and encompasses many of the diurnal birds of prey including hawks and eagles. It is one of the largest avian families with 233 species in 67 genera included in the family worldwide.

== Description ==
The spotted harrier is a medium-sized, slender bird of prey with adult females reaching 58–61 cm. Both adults and juvenile birds have an owl-like facial ruff that creates the appearance of a short, broad head as well as long yellow legs. The spotted harrier's wings feature prominent black tips and the tail is prominently barred and slightly wedge shaped.

Adult males are much smaller than the females only growing to 50–55 cm. Adult birds have blue to grey upper parts with a chestnut face and underparts that feature numerous white spots. Juvenile birds in their first year of life are mostly a dark brown and buff on their upperparts with pale buff underparts that feature brown streaks across the chest and stomach. During the second year of their life the spotted harrier takes on almost adult colouring with white streaks across their underparts instead of the prominent spots that can be seen on adults.

== Distribution and habitat ==
The spotted harrier is native to Australia and Indonesia, however vagrant populations have been seen in Timor-Leste. It has a geographic range of more than 20,000km2 (Birdlife International, 2012). Spotted harriers can be seen throughout most of Australia's mainland, except in densely forested or woodland habitats of the coast, escarpments and ranges, and rarely in Tasmania. In NSW individuals are widely dispersed, comprising a single population.

The spotted harrier is a terrestrial bird residing in open grasslands, open woodland including acacia and mallee, inland riparian woodland, grassland and shrubland. It can be most commonly found in native grassland however it is also seen in agricultural land and inland wetlands for the purpose of foraging.

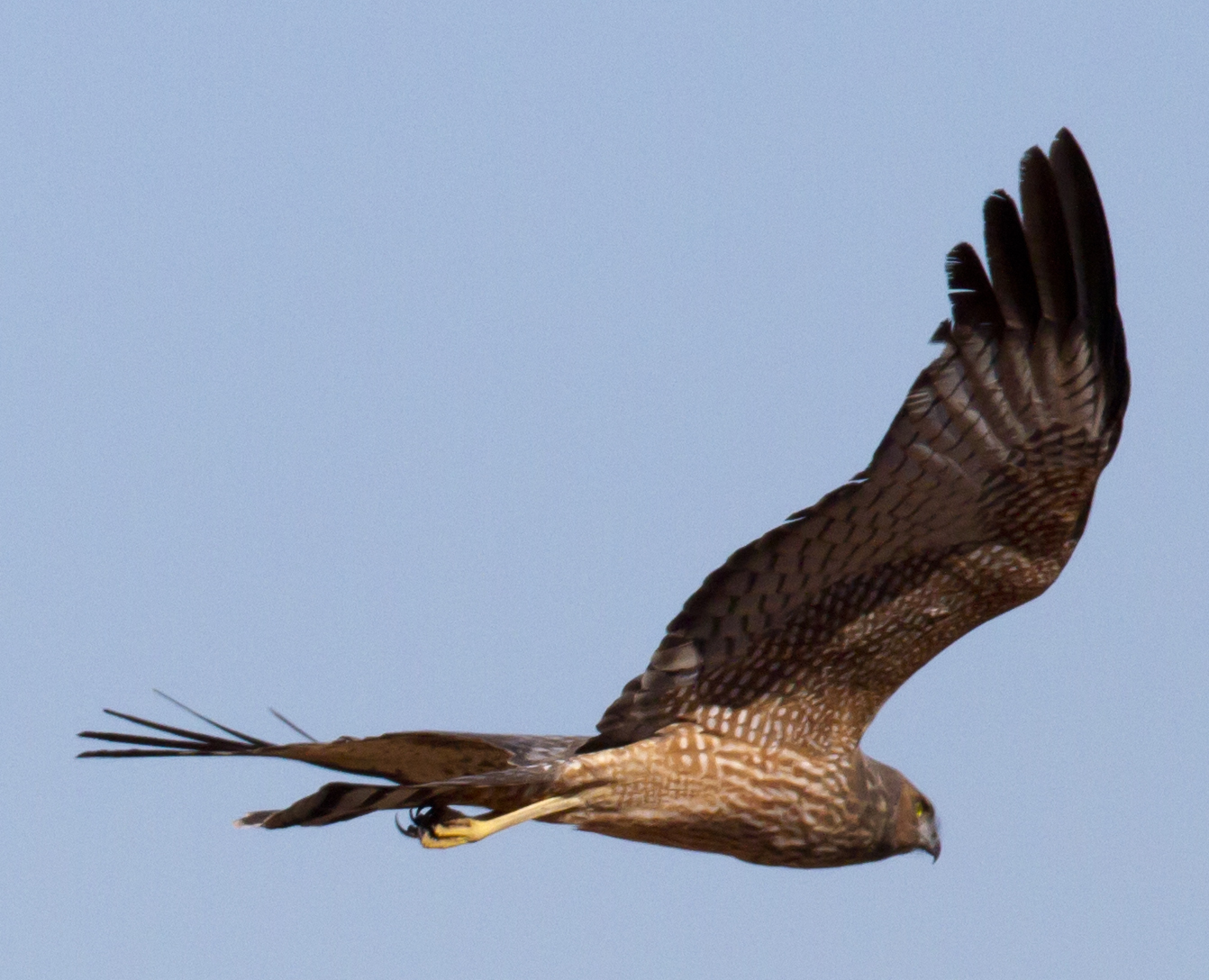
Subadult flying at Pilbara, Western Australia, Australia

== Diet ==
The spotted harrier is a carnivorous bird of prey feeding mostly on terrestrial mammals such as bandicoots, bettongs and rodents as well as small birds and reptiles and occasionally large insects. Formerly the species was heavily dependent on rabbits however the rapid spread of rabbit calicivirus disease led to a significant decline in rabbit numbers in arid and semi arid zones (by up to 65-85%). Due to this the spotted harrier is increasingly dependent of native prey however many of its former native mammalian prey species are extinct in inland NSW and many of its remaining key prey species such as terrestrial grassland birds are threatened by grazing as they require ground cover and are sensitive to habitat degradation. The spotted harrier soars with elevated wings when hunting.

== Breeding ==
A stick nest built in a tree is the method of choice for the spotted harrier. They reproduce in spring or sometimes autumn laying a clutch of 2–4 eggs. The incubation period is 33 days with young remaining in the nest for several months from hatching. The spotted harriers generation length is estimated to be 10 years.

== Conservation status ==
Due to its extremely large range, and its large and stable population, the spotted harrier has been designated as a species of least concern by the International Union for Conservation of Nature.

The species was included in a NSW population survey in 1977-81 which used 75 one degree grids to find bird population numbers. The spotted harrier recorded at mostly moderate to high reporting rates (11-40% and more than 40% of surveys per grid, respectively). Breeding was recorded in 14 of these grids. A repeat of this survey was performed in 1998-2002 which found that spotted harrier numbers had declined (less than 20% of surveys per grid), with breeding in only 6 grids. This suggests that a statewide decline of 70% over 3 generations (30 years) will occur. One issue with this study is that due to the large distribution of the spotted harrier this study only covers a small sample of the entire species, misrepresenting the species as a whole. Also it is known that there are many threatening processes occurring in NSW that are affecting populations on a large scale basis that are not happening as prolifically in other areas. This study should be performed through the whole distribution of the species to find and accurate summary of the species population status. This study does however accurately represent populations in NSW and therefore a management plan can be put in place to manage numbers in this state alone.

== Threats ==
The spotted harrier is mostly threatened by clearing and degradation of suitable foraging and breeding habitat. These threats also extend to key prey species affecting prey densities. Clearing and grazing of breeding sites are a key threat alongside secondary poisoning from rodenticides and pindone, a poison used in the control of rabbits.

Clearing of native vegetation' is listed as a Key Threatening Process in NSW under the Threatened Species Conservation Act 1995. Clearing has affected important bioregions on the NSW western slopes and plains which once contained high harrier breeding densities. Since the 1980s clearing has wiped 40-84% of these bioregions. 85-91% of these bioregions have also been affected by grazing. The landscape of these regions have also found to be highly stressed, most areas falling into landscape stress factor categories of 2–6 out of 6. More westerly NSW bioregions have also found to be heavily grazed and have landscape stress ratings of 3–4 from 6.
