= 1837 in birding and ornithology =

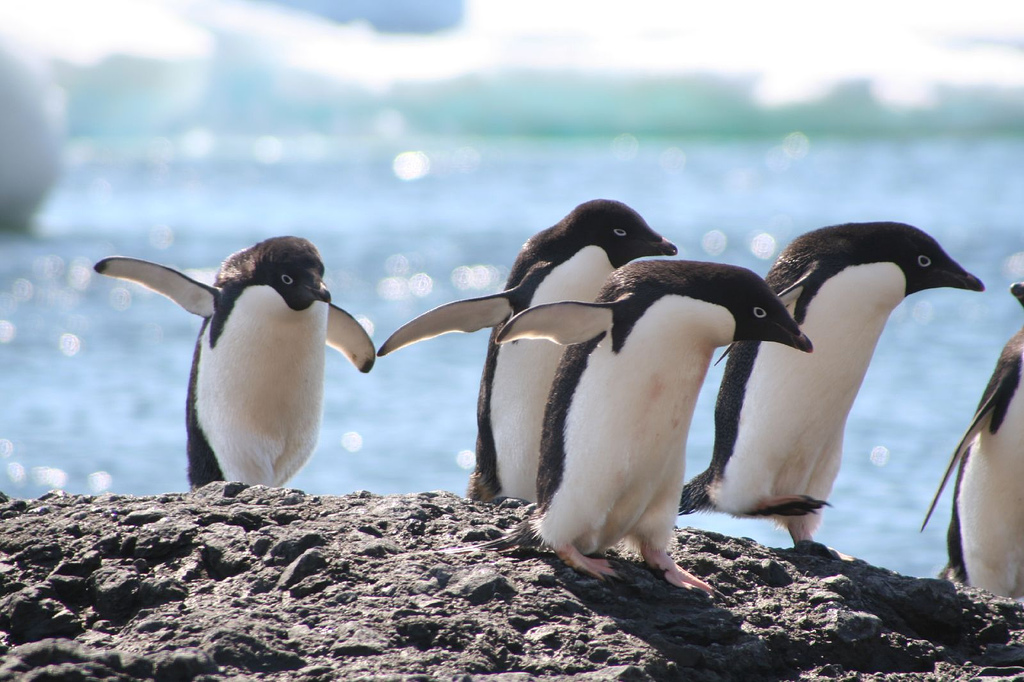
The Adélie penguin discovered on the d'Urville Circumnavigation was named for Adèle Dorothée d'Urville

- John Gould formally describes the huia
- Julien François Desjardins makes the last reports of the Mauritius scops owl
- Eugen Ferdinand von Homeyer publishes Systematische Übersicht der Vögel Pommerns
- Charles Darwin presents 80 mammal and 450 bird specimens to the Zoological Society.
- Death of Edward Donovan
- Death of Christian Ludwig Nitzsch
- Death of Benjamin Leadbeater (1760–1837)
- Jules Dumont d'Urville Circumnavigation. Discovery of Adélie Land named for d'Urville's wife Adèle Dorothée née Pépin.

The expedition members were:

- Capitaines : Jules Dumont d'Urville (L'Astrolabe), Charles Hector Jacquinot (La Zélée).
- Second de l'Astrolabe : lieutenant de vaisseau Gaston de Rocquemaurel
- Secrétaire du Commandant : César Desgraz (1816-?)
- Médecins-naturalistes : L'Astrolabe, Jacques Bernard Hombron (1798–1852) Chirurgien-major de 2ième classe, Louis Le Breton (1818–1866) Chirurgien de 3ième classe La Zélée Honoré Jacquinot (1815–1887) Chirurgien de 3ième classe, Élie Jean François Le Guillou (1806- after 1860) Chirurgien de 3ième classe.
- Préparateur-naturaliste : Pierre Marie Alexandre Dumoutier (1797–1871).
- Dessinateur: Ernest Goupil (1814–1840) (replaced on his death 4/01/1840 at Hobart-Town by Louis Le Breton Chirurgien de 3ième classe)
- Hydrographe-Cartographe : Clément Adrien Vincendon-Dumoulin (1811–1858)
- Commis de Marine sur l'Astrolabe : Louis-Jacques Ducorps (1811-?)
- Commis de Marine sur la Zélée : Félix Casimir Huon de Kermadec (1813-?)

Ongoing events

- William Jardine and Prideaux John Selby with the co-operation of James Ebenezer Bicheno, Illustrations of ornithology various publishers (Four volumes) 1825 and [1836–43]. Although issued partly in connection with the volume of plates, under the same title (at the time of issue), text and plates were purchasable separately and the publishers ... express the hope, also voiced by the author in his preface to the present work, that the text will constitute an independent work of reference. Vol. I was issued originally in 1825 [by A. Constable, Edinburgh], with nomenclature according to Temminck
