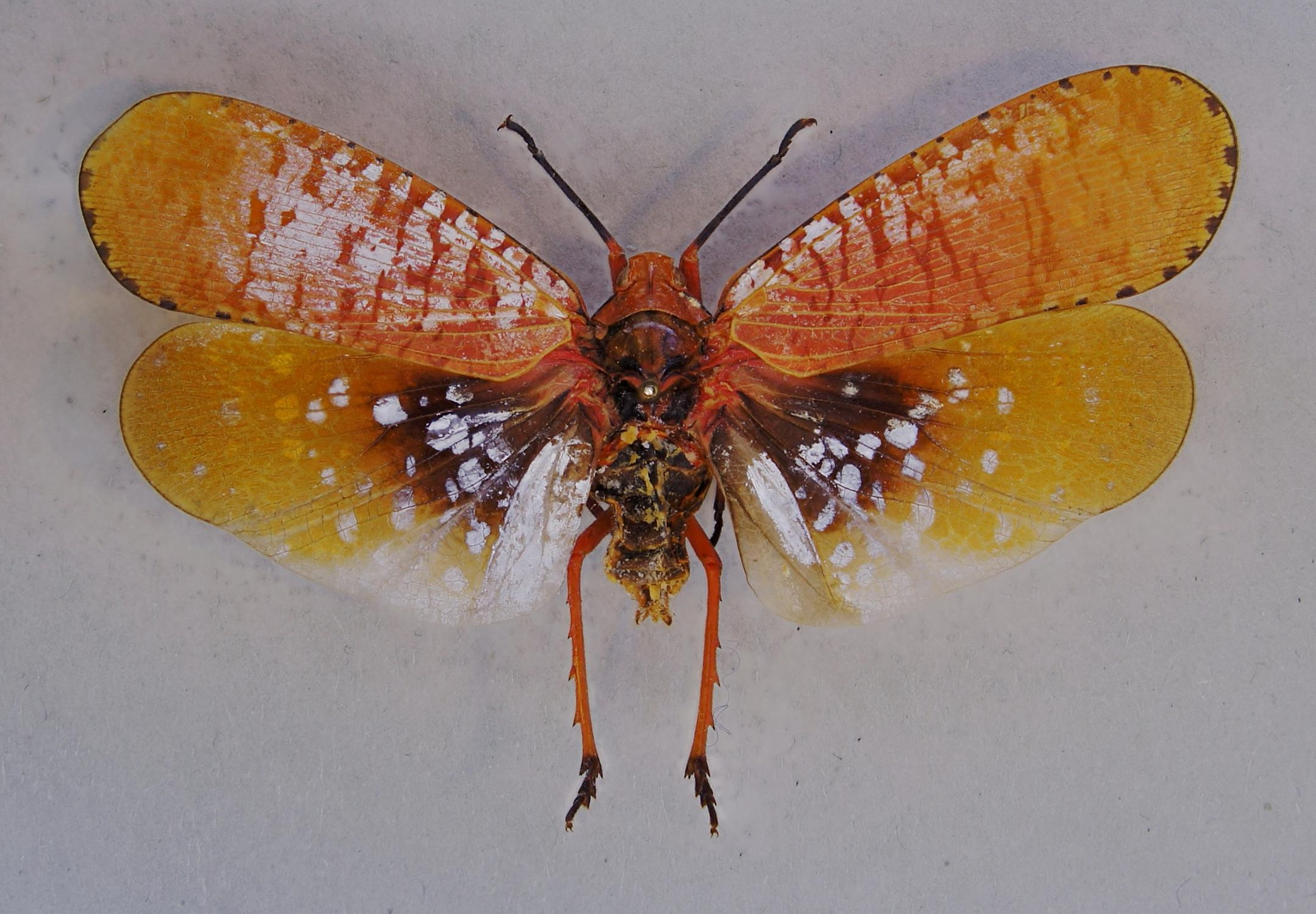
- Aphaena submaculata consanguinea

Scientific classification
- Domain: Eukaryota
- Kingdom: Animalia
- Phylum: Arthropoda
- Class: Insecta
- Order: Hemiptera
- Suborder: Auchenorrhyncha
- Infraorder: Fulgoromorpha
- Family: Fulgoridae
- Subfamily: Aphaeninae
- Tribe: Aphaenini
- Genus: Aphaena; Guérin-Méneville, 1834
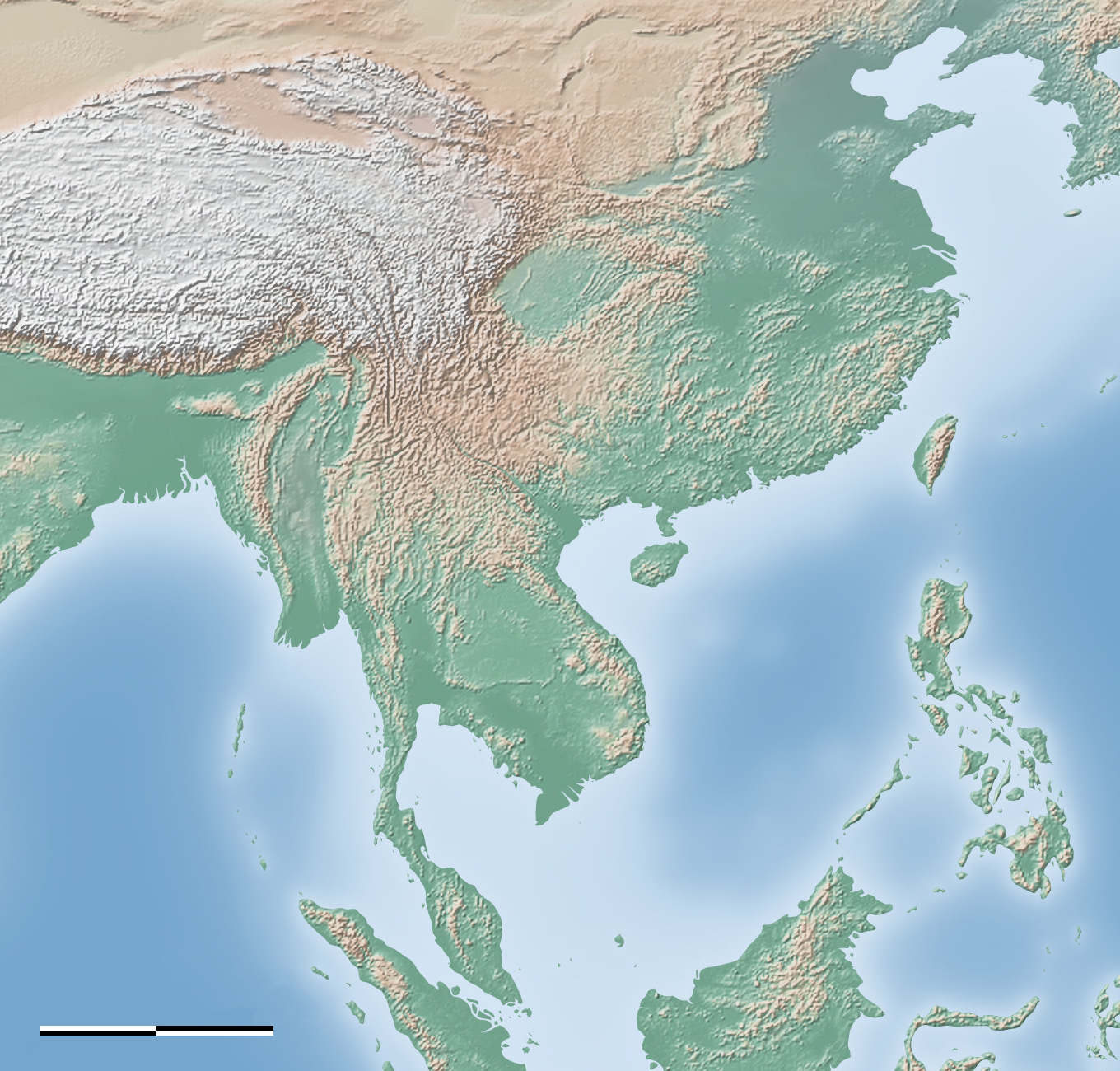
- Range: see FLOW

Synonyms
- Euphria Stål, 1863

= Aphaena =

Genus of planthoppers

Aphaena is a genus of planthoppers in the sub-family Aphaeninae of Fulgoridae. Species are distributed from eastern India, Indo-China, China and Malesia.

== Species ==
Fulgoromorpha Lists on the Web lists:

subgenus Aphaena

- Aphaena amorifera Schmidt, 1924
- Aphaena aurantia (Hope, 1840)
- Aphaena chionaema Butler, 1882
- Aphaena decolora (Chou & Wang, 1984)
- Aphaena discolor Guérin-Méneville, 1834 - type species
- Aphaena dissimilis Distant, 1906
- Aphaena murei Nagai & Porion, 1996
- Aphaena najas Schmidt, 1906
- Aphaena satrapa Gerstaecker, 1895
- Aphaena submaculata (Duncan, 1843)
  - A. submaculata burmanica Distant, 1906
  - A. submaculata consanguinea (Distant, 1906) (synonym Aphaena relata)
  - A. submaculata resima (Stål, 1855)

subgenus Callidepsa

- Aphaena amabilis (Hope, 1843)
- Aphaena cornuta (Fabricius, 1803)
- Aphaena hainanensis Wang, 1995

Extinct species

- †Aphaena atava Scudder, 1877
- †Aphaena lithoecia Zhang, 1989

== Gallery ==
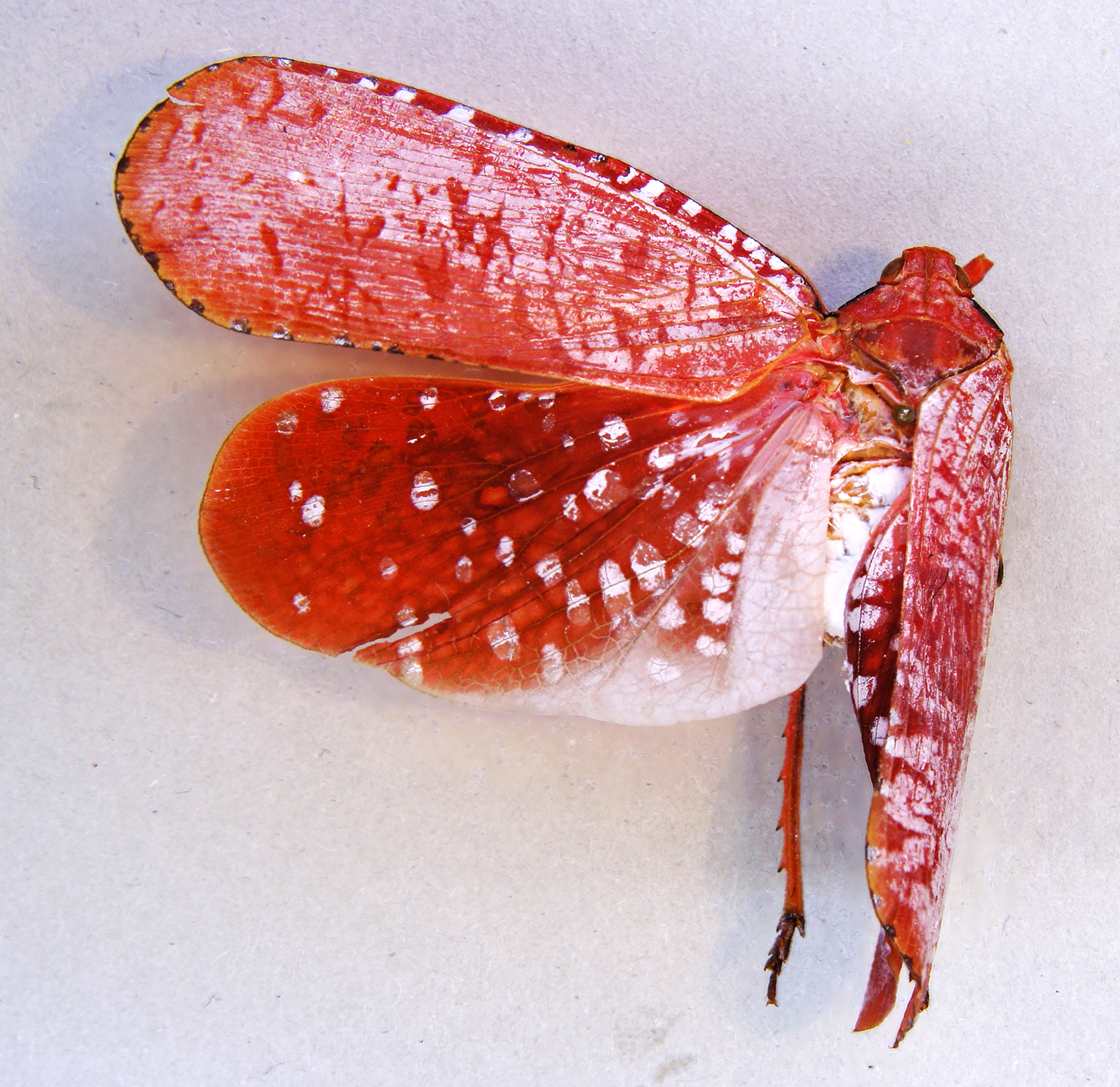
Aphaena discolor

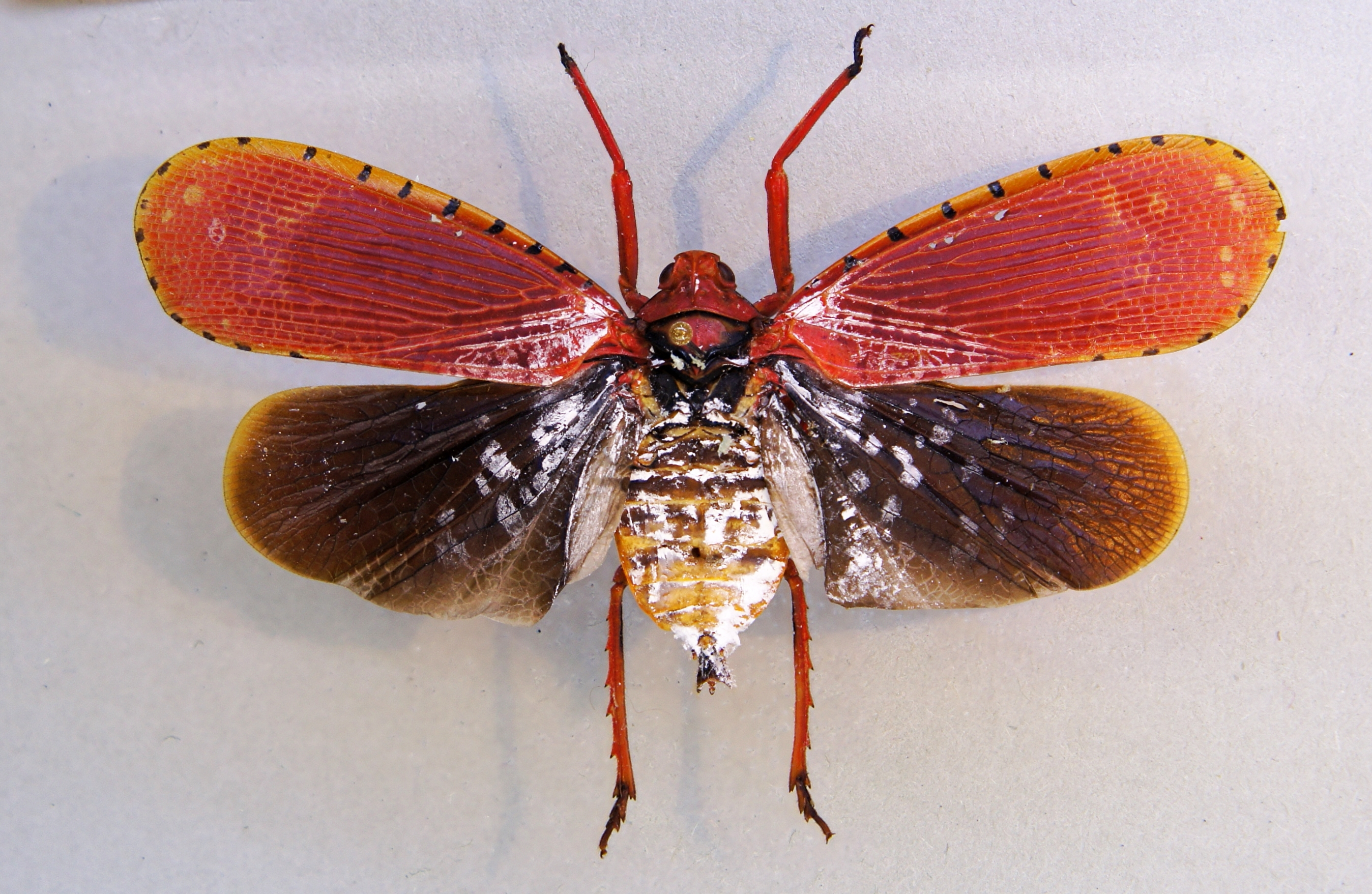
Aphaena dissimilis

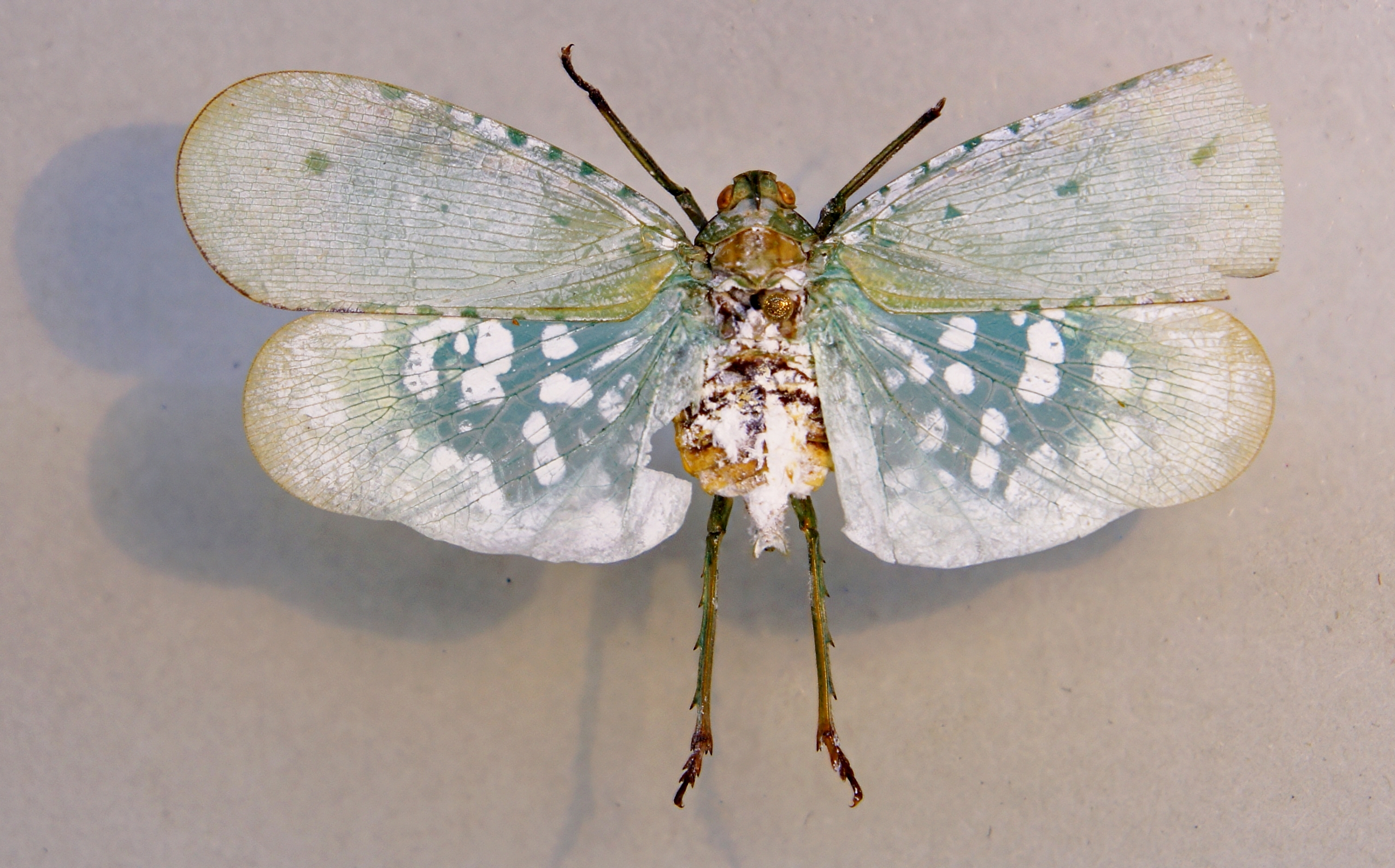
Aphaena najas

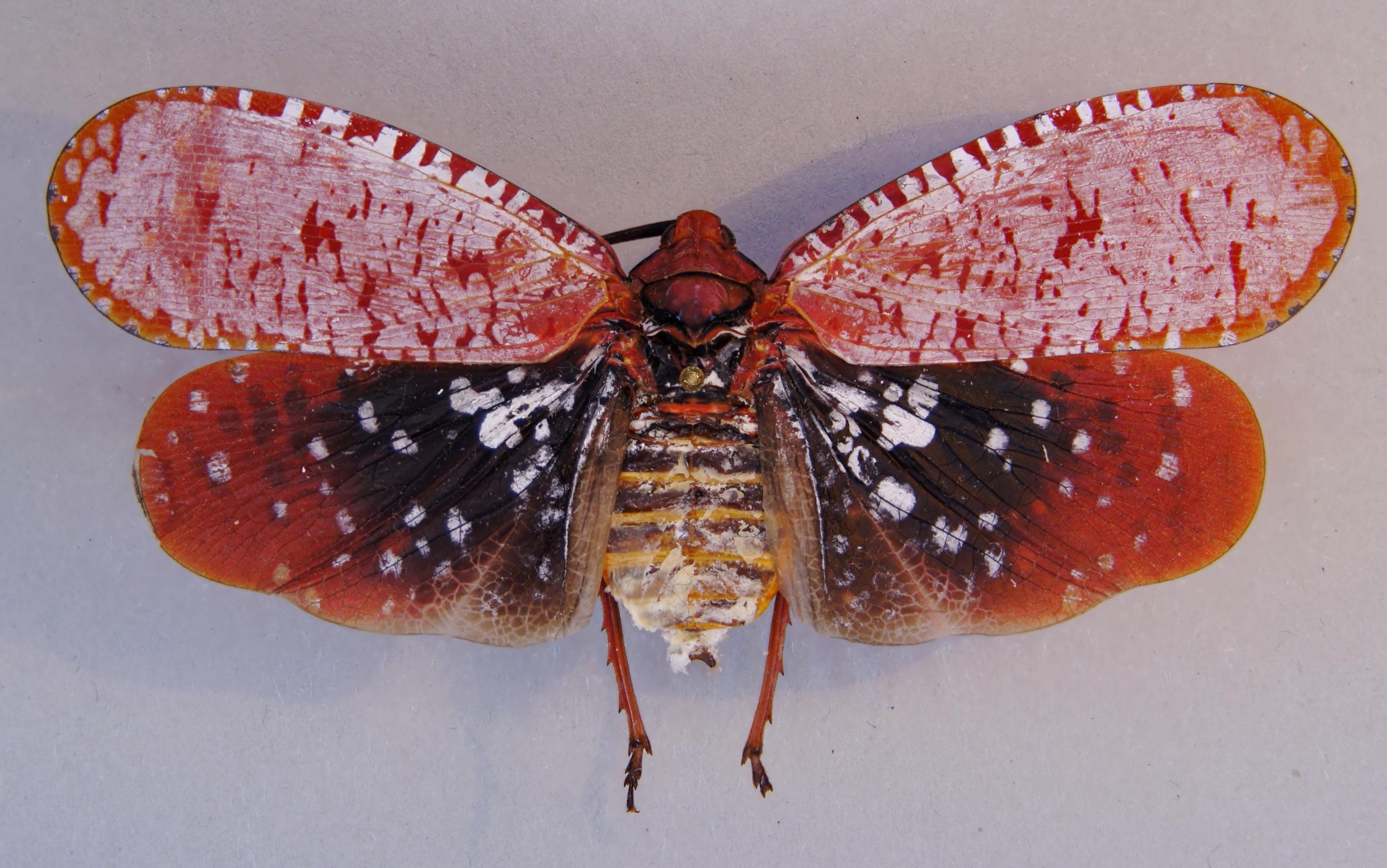
Aphaena submaculata
