= Gaetano Cara =

Italian archaeologist and naturalist

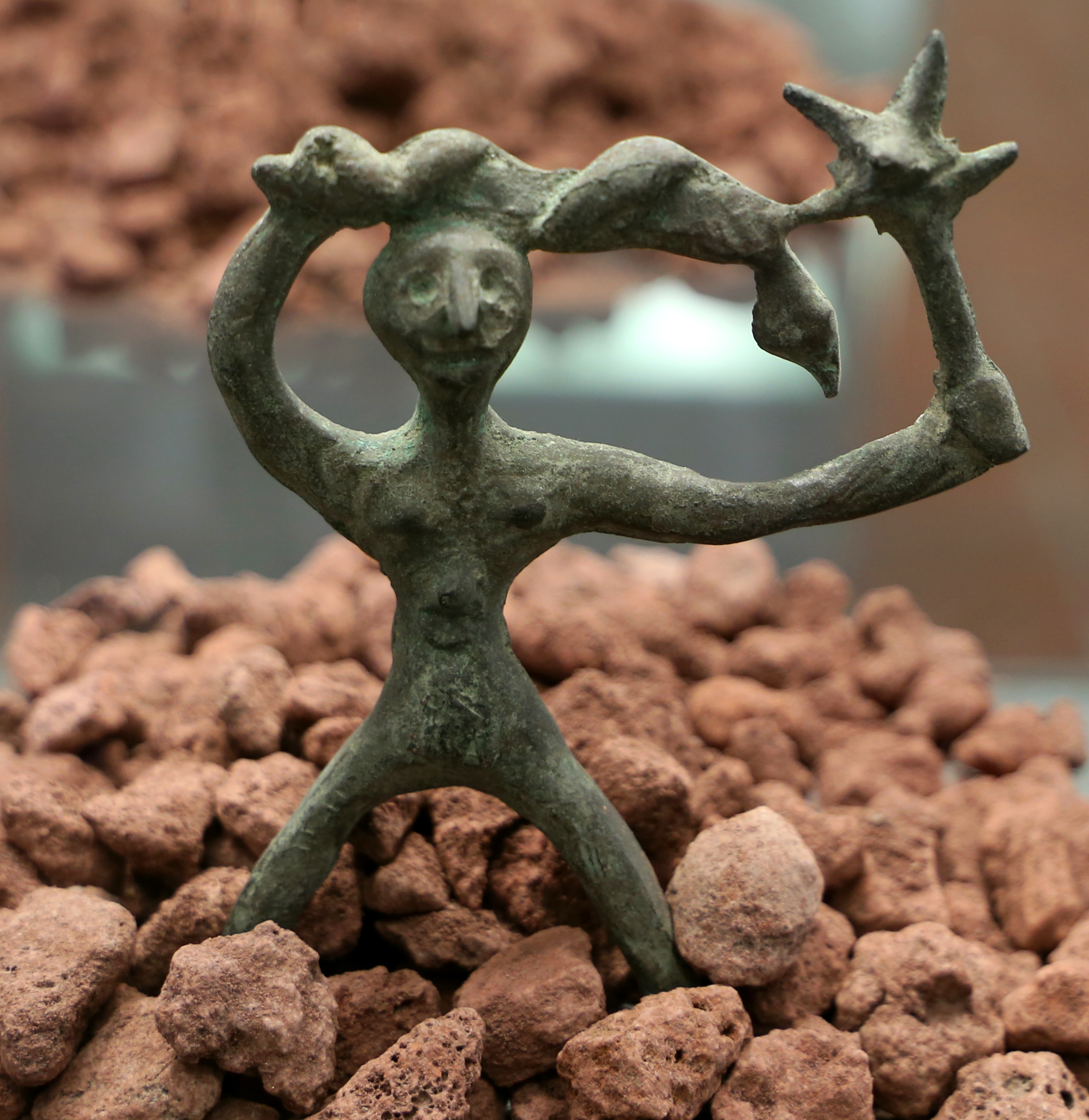
A forged Sardinian idols by Gaetano Cara

Gaetano Cara (1803 – 1877) was an Italian archaeologist and naturalist primarily interested in ornithology. He practised forgery and selling forged idols to many European museums.

Gaetano Cara was Director of the natural history museum Regio Museo di Storia Naturale di Cagliari from 1840 to 1858 and then of Museo Archeologico di Cagliari from 1862. In 1842, he provided an avifauna of Sardinia. This was much criticised by Giuseppe Géné and an amended list was provided by Tommaso Salvadori, who made field observations in Sardinia in 1863, as well as consulting the collection of birds of the Natural History Museum of Cagliari. He reported the results in Salvadori, 1864, Catalogo degli Uccelli di Sardegna, con note e osservazioni. Cara responded in 1866 to defend his own studies.

== Works ==
- Cara G. 1863 Monumenti d'Antichità di recente trovati in Tharros e Cornus, esistenti nel K. Museo Archeologico. Cagliari.
- Cara, G. 1842. Elenco degli uccelli che trovansi nell'isola di Sardegna, od ornitologia sarda.Torino. (Reycend). Digitised
- Cara, G. 1866. Osservazioni di Gaetano Cara al catalogo degli uccelli di Sardegna pubblicato dal dottore Tommaso Salvadori. Cagliari. Timon.

Reprints

- Cara, G. 1975. Elenco degli uccelli che trovansi nell'isola di Sardegna, od Ornitologia sarda. Sala Bolognese. Forni. Altra ed.: 1983; Ripr. facs. dell'ed. 1842
- Cara, G. 1994. Elenco degli uccelli che trovansi nell'isola di Sardegna, od Ornitologia sarda. Cagliari. GIA. Ripr. facs. dell'ed. 1842
