= James Duncan (zoologist) =

Scottish naturalist (1804–1861)

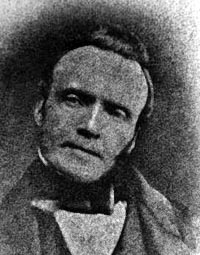
James Duncan

James Duncan MWS (1804–1861) was a Scottish naturalist. After his education in Edinburgh, he followed the family tradition to work in the Scottish church. He however retired and worked with publishing firms, and among other works helping produce an index of Encyclopaedia Britannica.

He wrote

- with James Wilson Entomologia Edinensis: Or A Description and History of the Insects Found in Edinburgh (1834)
- Beetles, British and Foreign, edited by William Jardine (1835)
- in William Jardine's The Naturalist’s Library. Entomology, 7 volumes. (Year unknown)
- Introduction to Entomology.: Comprehending a General View of the Metamorphoses, William Home Lizars, Samuel Highley, W. Curry, Junr. & Co. 662 pages. (1840).
- with William Jardine Bees: Comprehending the uses and economical management of the honey-bee of Britain and other countries, together with the known wild species. Edinburgh London, W.H. Lizars; Henry G. Bohn. 602 pages. (1859).

James Duncan's papers on Diptera appeared in the Magazine of Zoology and Botany ( 1, ii: 145-61; iv: 359-68; v: 453-6)
