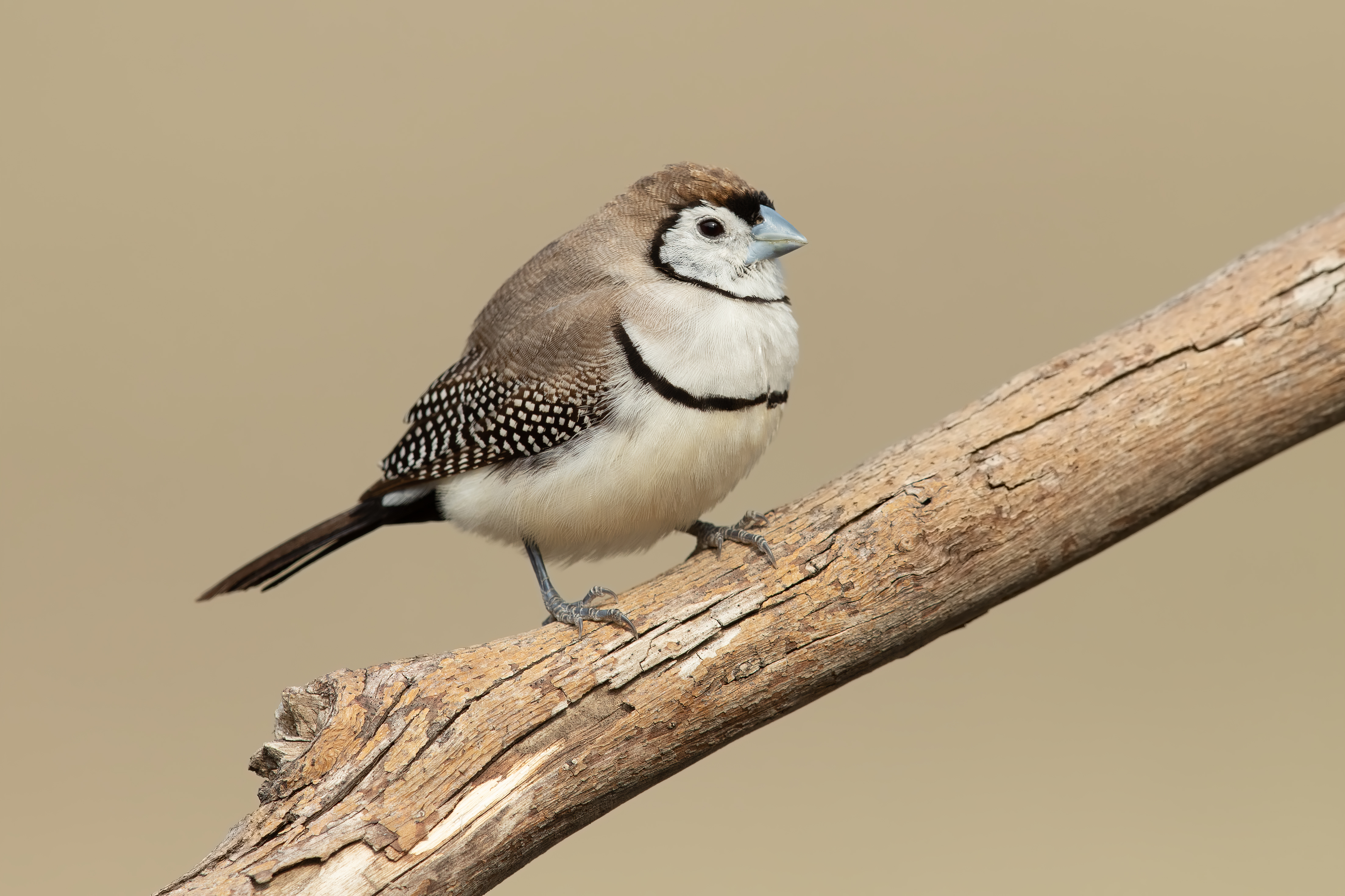
- Glen Davis, New South Wales, Australia

Conservation status
- Least Concern (IUCN 3.1)

Scientific classification
- Kingdom: Animalia
- Phylum: Chordata
- Class: Aves
- Order: Passeriformes
- Family: Estrildidae
- Genus: Stizoptera; Oberholser, 1899
- Species: S. bichenovii

Binomial name
- Stizoptera bichenovii (Vigors & Horsfield, 1827)

Subspecies
- See text

Synonyms
- Taeniopygia bichenovii (Vigors & Horsfield, 1827)

= Double-barred finch =

Species of bird

The double-barred finch (Stizoptera bichenovii) is an estrildid finch found in dry savannah, tropical (lowland) dry grassland and shrubland habitats in northern and eastern Australia. It is sometimes referred to as Bicheno's finch or as the owl finch, the latter of which owing to the dark ring of feathers around the face. It is the only species placed in the genus Stizoptera .

== Taxonomy ==
The double-barred finch was formally described in 1827 by the naturalists Nicholas Vigors and Thomas Horsfield from specimens collected near Shoalwater Bay and Broad Sound in Queensland, Australia. They coined the binomial name Fringilla bichenovii. The species was formerly placed in the genus Taeniopygia. A molecular phylogenetic study of the Estrildidae published in 2020 found that the genus Taeniopygia was not monophyletic. In the reorganization to create monophyletic genera, the double-barred finch was moved to the resurrected genus Stizoptera that had been introduced in 1899 by the American ornithologist Harry C. Oberholser. The genus name combines the Ancient Greek stizō meaning "to tattoo" with pteron meaning "wing". The specific epithet commemorates James Ebenezer Bicheno, a colonial secretary of Van Diemen's Land appointed in September 1842.

Two subspecies are recognised:

- S. b. annulosa (Gould, 1840) – north Western Australia and Northern Territory (northwest, north Australia)
- S. b. bichenovii (Vigors & Horsfield, 1827) – north Queensland to southeast New South Wales (east Australia)

== Description ==
The double-barred finch is a 10–11 cm long munia-like bird. It has a white face bordered with black, brown upperparts and throat, and white underparts. The throat and underparts are separated by another black line. The wings are patterned in brown and white. The sexes are similar, but juveniles are duller and browner. The subspecies S. b. annulosa differs from the nominate in having a black rather than a white rump.

== Behaviour ==
The double-barred finch is granivorous and highly gregarious. Nests are built in grass, bushes or low trees, with four to six eggs laid per clutch. The call is a soft tet or a louder peew, and the song is a soft fluting, which is somewhat like the zebra finch.

== Gallery ==
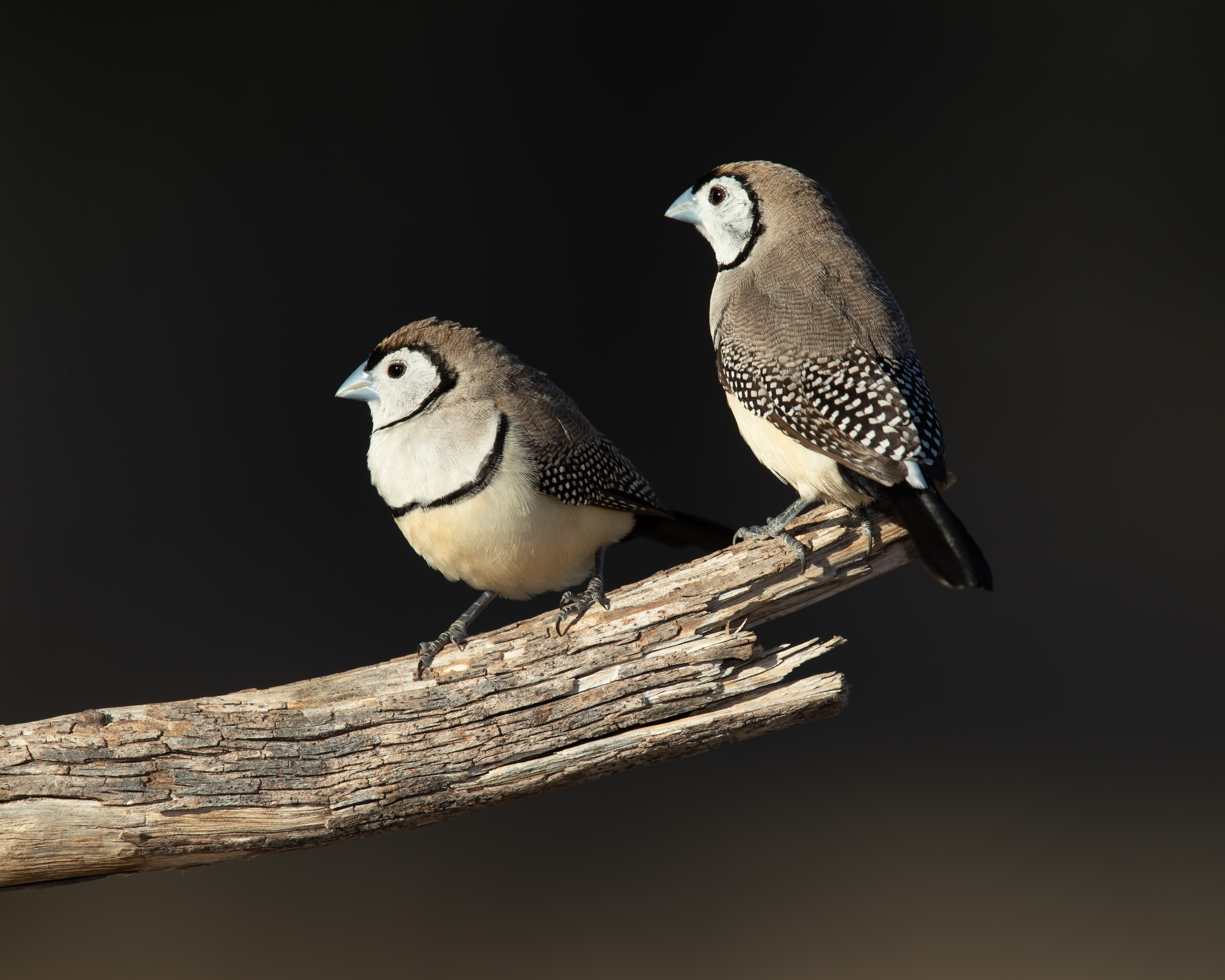
Lithgow, New South Wales, Australia

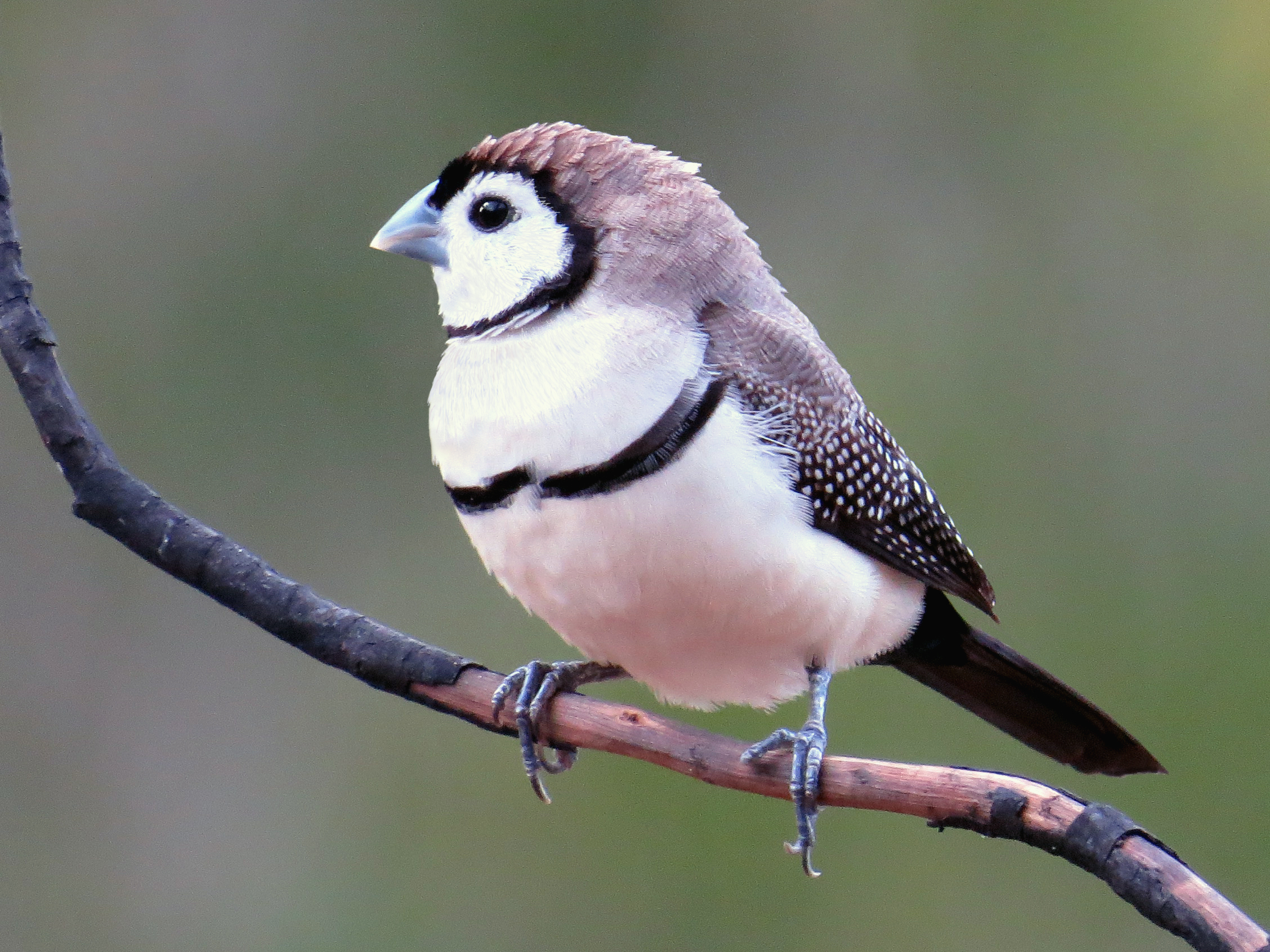
Gregory River, Queensland

South-east Queensland, Australia

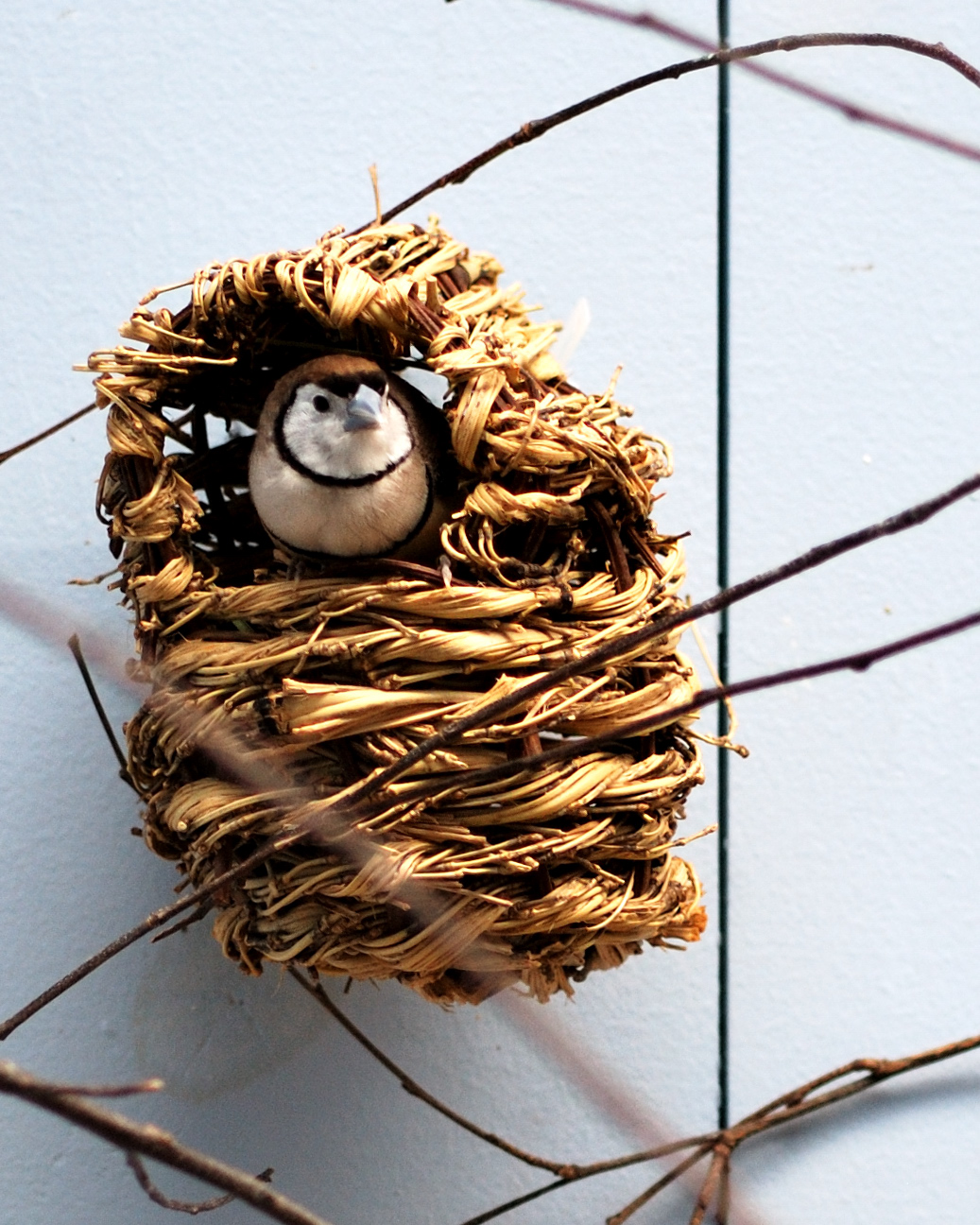
Nesting in captivity
