= Robert L. Metcalf =

American entomologist

Robert Lee Metcalf (November 13, 1916 – November 11, 1998) was an American entomologist, environmental toxicologist, and insect chemical ecologist. Metcalf was noted for making environmentally safe pest control achievable.

Metcalf was a member of the National Academy of Sciences, a fellow of the American Academy of Arts and Sciences, a member of National Research Council, a fellow and president of the Entomological Society of America. He was a member of Environmental Protection Agency's Pesticide Advisory Panel. The National Center for Biotechnology Information called Metcalf "one of the leading entomologists of the 20th century". The National Academies Press called him the twentieth century’s most influential entomologist. The University of Florida called him "a brilliant scientist and educator".

== Notable awards and distinctions ==
- Order of Cherubini, University of Pisa, Italy, 1966
- Charles T. Spencer Award, American Chemical Society, 1966
- Chancellor's Award for Excellence in Research, University of California, Riverside, 1967
- International Award, Pesticide Chemistry, American Chemical Society, 1972
- Meritorious Service Award, American Mosquito Association, 1976
- Ciba Geigy Award of the Entomological Society of America, 1977
- Memorial Lecture Award of the Entomological Society of America, 1978
- Honorary Member, Entomological Society of America, 1979
- School of Life Sciences, University of Illinois, Distinguished Lectureship Award, 1979
- Founders' Award, Society for Environmental Chemistry and Toxicology, 1983

== Life and career ==
Metcalf was born in Columbus, Ohio. He received bachelor's and master's degrees from University of Illinois in 1939 and 1940, respectively. He received his Ph.D. from Cornell University in 1942. Metcalf joined the faculty of the University of California, Riverside in 1948. He moved to the University of Illinois in 1968.
