= Friedrich Berge =

German naturalist, ornithologist and entomologist

Carl Friedrich Wilhelm Berge
- Born: 11 December 1811; Stuttgart
- Died: 19 September 1883
- Scientific career
- Fields: Naturalism, Ornithology, Entomology

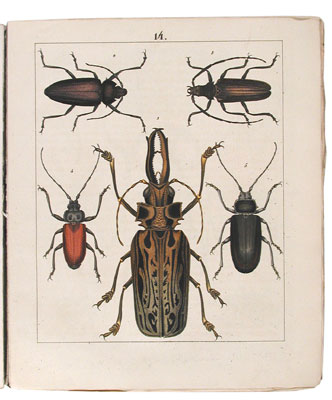
Plate from Kaferbuch which depicts 1315 illustrations of beetles

Carl Friedrich Wilhelm Berge (11 December 1811, Stuttgart–19 September 1883) was a German naturalist, ornithologist and entomologist. He was the author of Kaferbuch (on beetles) Conchylienbuch (on shells) and Schmetterlingsbuch (on butterflies and moths) and Die Fortpflanzung europäischer und aussereuropäischer Vögel. Ein Beitrag zur Naturgeschichte derselben (Stuttgart, L.F. Rieger, 1840–1841). This work on European and non-European birds gives brief descriptions of range and nesting habits.

His Schmetterlingsbuch was published in many editions, continuing after his death. The plates were re-used, with translated and edited texts in guides to the Lepidopteran faunas of other west European countries.. For example Britain and France. The authors were W.F. Kirby and Louis Marie Depuiset.

== Works ==
- Giftpflanzen-Buch oder allgemeine und besondere Naturgeschichte sämmtlicher inländischen sowie der wichtigsten ausländischen phanerogamischen und cryptogamischen Giftgewächse, mit treuen Abbildungen sämmtlicher inländischer und vieler ausländischer Gattungen . Hoffmann, Stuttgart 1845 Digital edition by the University and State Library Düsseldorf
