= Louis Hippolyte Bouteille =

French ornithologist

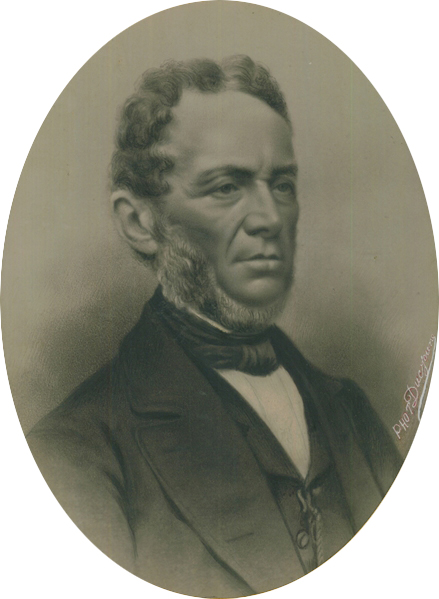
Louis Hippolyte Bouteille

Louis Hippolyte Bouteille (2 January 1804, Saint-Gilles-du-Gard - 19 August 1881, Grenoble ) was a French ornithologist

Bouteille studied pharmacy at Avignon from 1820 to 1822, then at Geneva from 1822 to 1825 then at Lyon from 1825 to 1827. He moved to Grenoble obtained pharmaceutical qualification from Faculté de Montpellier in 1833 where he practised.

A naturalist from his youth he studied insects and birds. In 1843 he published Ornithologie du Dauphiné, ou Description des oiseaux observés dans les départements de l'Isère, de la Drôme, des Hautes-Alpes(two volumes). He closed his shop in 1847 when he gained the post of Conservateur at Muséum d'histoire naturelle de Grenoble fr:Muséum d'histoire naturelle de Grenoble to the detriment of Albin Crépu (1799–1859).

Bouteille supervised the construction du Muséum in the Jardin des plantes considerably enriched the collections. He founded "la Société d'acclimatation des Alpes" also the Jardin d'acclimatation de Grenoble in 1854. He was also the author of Faune de l’Oisans in Essai descriptif de l’Oisans d'Aristide Albert (1821–1903).
