= James Ebenezer Bicheno =

British writer, colonial official and botanist (1785–1851)

James Ebenezer Bicheno FRS
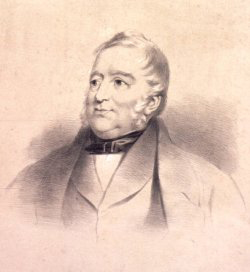
- Born: 25 January 1785; Newbury, Berkshire, Kingdom of Great Britain
- Died: 25 February 1851 (aged 66); Hobart Town, Van Diemen's Land
- Scientific career
- Fields: Botanist

James Ebenezer Bicheno FRS (25 January 1785 – 25 February 1851) was a British writer, colonial official and botanist.

== Biography ==
Bicheno was born in Newbury, Berkshire, the son of the Rev. James Bicheno, who was minister of the Baptist Church there. He was called to the bar in 1822 but seems to have spent most of his time until 1832 in writing and natural history pursuits, especially with the Linnean Society. He was elected a Fellow of the Royal Society in May, 1827.

In 1832 he left London to live at Ty Maen, South Cornelly, Glamorgan, where he had been one of the founders of the Maesteg Ironworks in 1826. and where he was a friend of Lewis Weston Dillwyn. This investment ultimately failed and he needed to look for an income.

During his years in south Wales Bicheno held conservative views at a time of considerable social and economic change. He was certainly anti-Chartist as his correspondence with the Marquis of Bute (John Crichton-Stuart), the Lord Lieutenant of Glamorgan, clearly shows. He was ever vigilant regarding Chartism in the Maesteg district and sent regular reports of any radical activity to the Marquis.

He was appointed colonial secretary of Van Diemen's Land in September 1842. He was a keen amateur botanist and experimented with plants on his small farm on the banks of the New Town Rivulet. He had several papers on botany and natural history published in its Transactions and assisted Sir William Jardine in preparing the two volumes of Illustrations of Ornithology (Edinburgh, 1830). He lectured on botany to the Mechanics' Institute and had papers published in the Transactions of the Royal Society of Tasmania.

He enjoyed books, good food and wine, music and art. His library of 2,500 books was considered the best in the colony.

Bicheno was a large man, and it was said that he could fit three full bags of wheat in his trousers.

== Commemoration ==
- Bicheno, a town on the east coast of Tasmania, Australia was named after him.
- Bicheno's finch (Taeniopygia bichenovii) was named to commemorate him.
