= Prideaux John Selby =

English ornithologist, botanist and natural history artist

- Born: 23 July 1788; Alnwick, Northumberland, England
- Died: 27 March 1867 (aged 78); Bamburgh, Northumberland, England
- Scientific career
- Fields: ornithologist, botanist, artist
- Author abbrev. (botany): P.Selby
- Author abbrev. (zoology): Selby

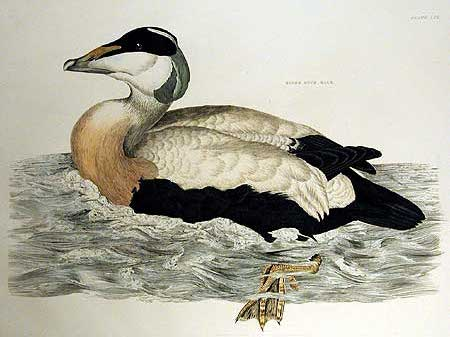
Eider duck from "Illustrations of British Ornithology"

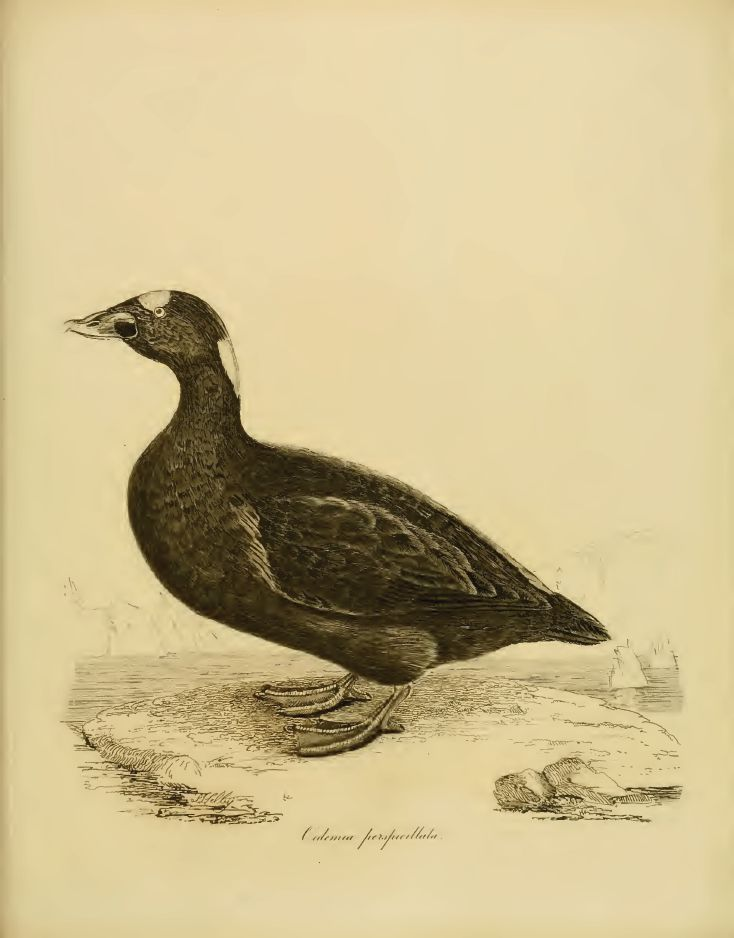
Melanitta perspicillata from "Jardine's Illustrations of the Duck Tribe"

Prideaux John Selby FRSE FLS (23 July 1788 – 27 March 1867) was an English ornithologist, botanist and natural history artist.

== Life ==
Selby was born in Bondgate Street in Alnwick in Northumberland, the eldest son of George Selby of Beal and Twizell (d.1804), and his wife, Margaret Cook. He was educated at Durham School.

He studied at University College, Oxford. He succeeded in 1804 to the family estates at Beal, and added to the landholdings there at a cost of some £14000 in about 1840. He sold the Beal estate amounting to 1,450 acres (590 ha) in 1850 for £47000 (£5,470,000 at today's prices).

He died at Twizell House and was buried in Bamburgh churchyard.

== Family ==
In 1810, he married Lewis Tabitha Mitford (1782–1859) daughter of Bertram Osbaldeston Mitford (1748–1800) of Dennet's Hall in Leicester. They had three daughters.

== Work ==
Selby is best known for his Illustrations of British Ornithology (1821–1834), the first set of life-sized illustrations of British birds. He also wrote Illustrations of Ornithology with William Jardine and A History of British Forest-trees (1842).

Many of the illustrations in his works were drawn from specimens in his collection. His wife’s first cousin and friend, Lt John Atherton of the 13th Light Dragoons who died on passage from Madras to England onboard the Rockingham in July 1827 sent a variety of specimens. Text appearing immediately before the following illustration states that Lt Atherton took the passage for the benefit of his health.

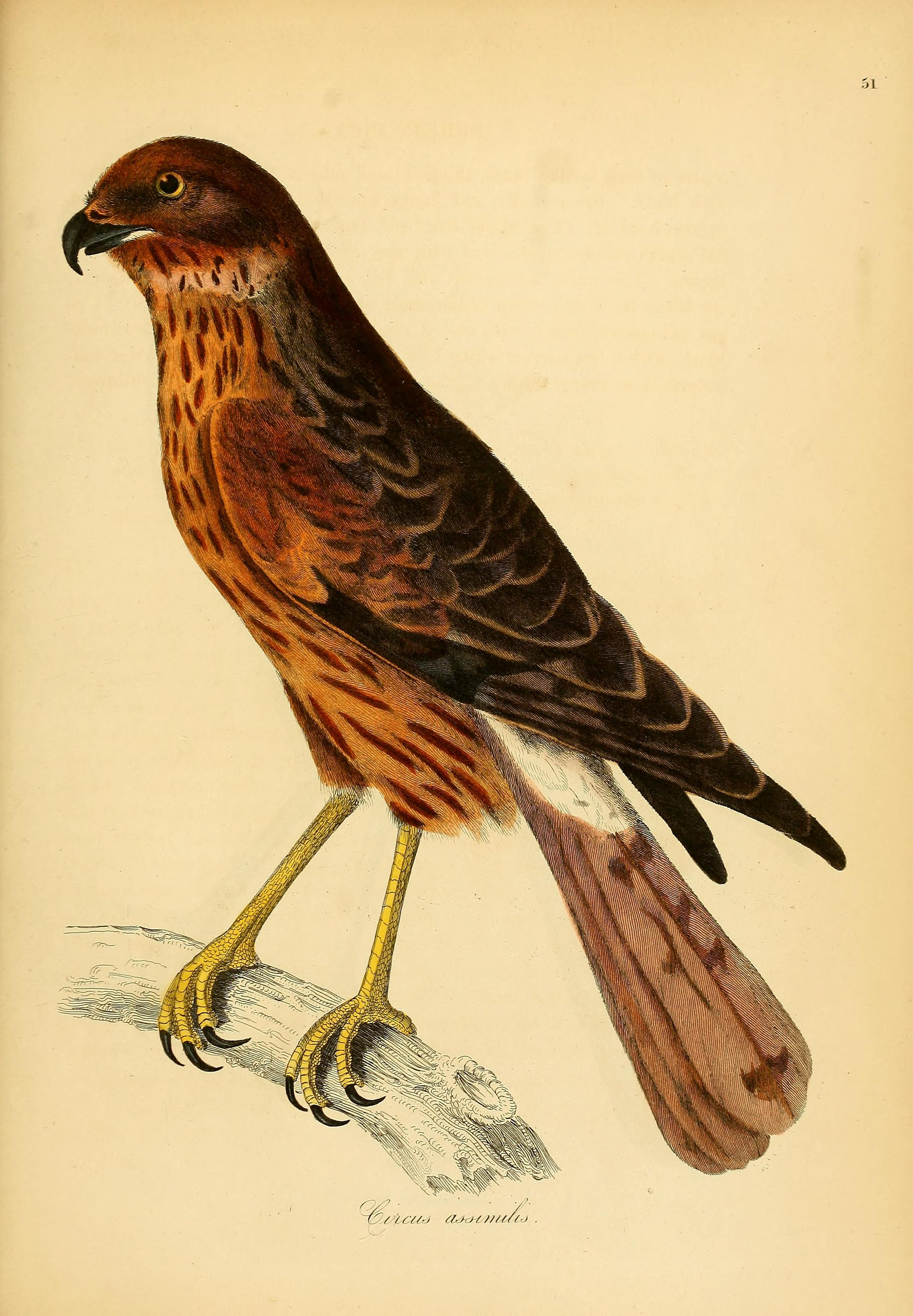
Spotted Harrier (Circus assimilis)

Lt John Atherton, was the brother of Robert Atherton of Sri Lanka.

In addition to the above works he contributed to Jardine's Naturalist's Library the volumes on the pigeons (1835) and the parrots (1836), the latter illustrated by Edward Lear. He was for some time one of the editors of the Magazine of Zoology and Botany.

His collections were sold in 1885 and became dispersed. The South African birds collected by Andrew Smith went to the Zoology Museum of the University of Cambridge.

== See also ==
- Category:Taxa named by Prideaux John Selby
- Thomas Bewick and his History of British Birds
- William Yarrell

== Further references ==
Bowey, K. and Newsome, M. (Ed) 2012. The Birds of Durham. Durham Bird Club. ISBN 978-1-874701-03-3

== Bibliography ==
- Mullens; Swann. (1918). A Bibliography of British Ornithology.
- Raine, Revd. James (1852). The History and Antiquities of North Durham. p338
- Jackson, Christine E. (2004). Oxford Dictionary of National Biography.
