= Sir William Jardine, 7th Baronet =

Scottish ornithologist and naturalist

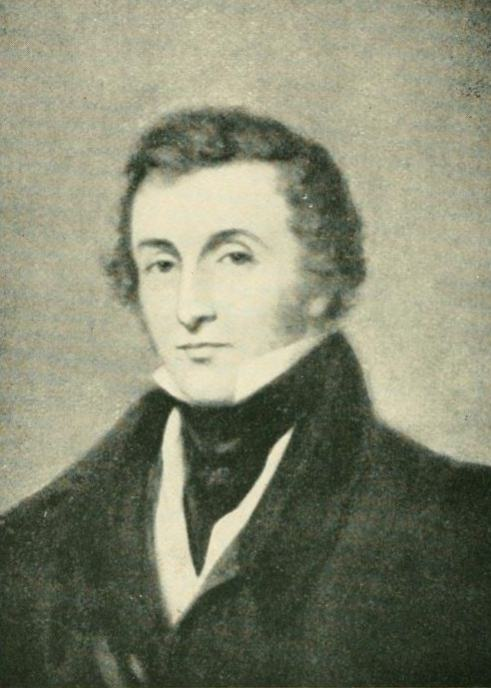
- Portrait, c. 1822
- Born: 23 February 1800; Edinburgh, Scotland
- Died: 21 November 1874 (aged 74); Sandown, Isle of Wight, England
- Education: Edinburgh University
- Known for: Natural history

Sir William Jardine, 7th Baronet of Applegarth FRS FRSE FLS FSA (23 February 1800 – 21 November 1874) was a Scottish naturalist. He is known for his editing of a long series of natural history books, The Naturalist's Library.

== Life and work ==
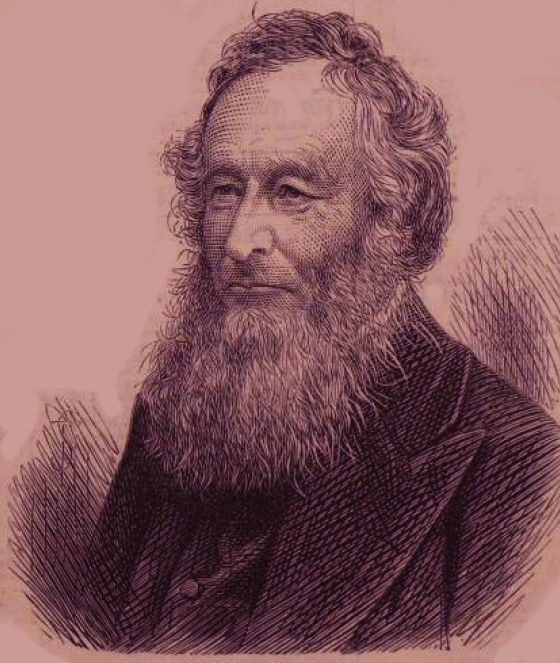
Jardine c. 1870, an illustration accompanying his obituary in the Illustrated London News

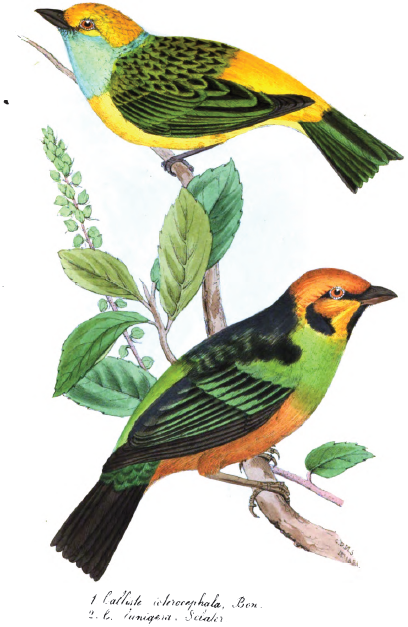
Painting of silver-throated tanager and flame-faced tanager, by Jardine's daughter, 1851

Jardine was born on 23 February 1800 at 28 North Hanover Street in Edinburgh, the son of Sir Alexander Jardine, 6th baronet of Applegarth and his wife, Jane Maule. He was educated in both York and Edinburgh then studied medicine at Edinburgh University.

From 1817 to 1821 he lodged with Rev Dr Andrew Grant at James Square, an arrangement made by his father. Grant was minister of St Andrew's Church on George Street.

In his early years, aged only 25, he was elected a fellow of the Royal Society of Edinburgh his proposer being Sir David Brewster.

He was a co-founder of the Berwickshire Naturalists' Club, and contributed to the founding of the Ray Society. He was "keenly addicted to field-sports, and a master equally of the rod and the gun". While ornithology was his main passion, he also studied ichthyology, botany and geology. His book on fossil burrows and traces, the Ichnology of Annandale, included fossils from his ancestral estate. He was the first to coin the term ichnology, and this was the first book written on the subject. His private natural history museum and library are said to have been the finest in Britain.

Jardine made natural history available to all levels of Victorian society by editing the hugely popular forty volumes of The Naturalist's Library (1833–1843) issued and published by his brother in law, the Edinburgh printer and engraver, William Home Lizars. The series was divided into four main sections: Ornithology (14 volumes), Mammalia (13 volumes), Entomology (7 volumes), and Ichthyology (6 volumes); each prepared by a leading naturalist. James Duncan wrote the insect volumes. The artists responsible for the illustrations included Edward Lear. The work was published in Edinburgh by W. H. Lizars. The frontispiece is a portrait of Pierre André Latreille.

His other publications included an edition of Gilbert White's Natural History of Selborne which re-established White's reputation, Illustrations of Ornithology (1825–1843), and an affordable edition of Alexander Wilson's Birds of America.

Jardine described of a number of bird species, alone or in conjunction with his friend Prideaux John Selby. He died on 21 November 1874 in Sandown, Isle of Wight.

== Family and descendants ==
He was married to Jane Home Lizars, and through her was brother-in-law to John Lizars FRSE and William Home Lizars. After Lady Jardine's death he married the daughter of the Rev. William Samuel Symonds, the well-known geologist.

Jardine's daughter, Catherine Dorcas Maule Jardine, married Hugh Edwin Strickland and produced many of the illustrations for Illustrations of Ornithology (identifiable by her initials, CDMS).

The Olympic rower Sir Matthew Pinsent is a direct descendant of Jardine.

== Bibliography ==
Jardine wrote many books and edited the series and wrote many of the books for The Naturalist's Library. The books are listed below by publication date with those of The Naturalist's Library under a separate heading.

- 1825 to 1843, Illustrations of Ornithology, written with Prideaux John Selby in four volumes:
  - Volume I
  - Volume II
  - Volume III
  - Volume IV
- 1839, Illustrations of the British Salmonidae with Descriptions
- 1848, Contributions to Ornithology for 1848: Vols. I and II
- 1850, Contributions to Ornithology for 1850: Vols. III and IV
- 1851, The Natural History of Selborne, by Gilbert White with additions, supplementary notes a short biography of Reverend Gilbert White by Jardine
- 1853, Contributions to Ornithology for 1852: Vol. V
- 1858, Memoirs of Hugh Edwin Strickland, M.A.

=== The Naturalist's Library ===
Jardine edited the series of books that were published a part of The Naturalist's Library, and include (in the order in which they were published):

1. 1833, Ornithology: Humming Birds: Part I, by Jardine with a memoir of Carl Linnaeus
2. 1833, The Natural History of Monkeys, by Jardine with a memoir of Comte de Buffon
3. 1833, Ichthyology: British Fishes: Part II, by Robert Hamilton with a memoir of Alexander von Humboldt
4. undated, Ornithology: Humming Birds: Part II, by Jardine with a memoir of Thomas Pennant
5. 1834, Mammalia: Vol. II: The Felinae, by Jardine with a memoir of Georges Cuvier
6. 1834, The Natural History of Gallinaceous Birds: Vol. I, by Jardine with a memoir of Aristotle
7. 1835, The Natural History of Fishes of the Perch Family, by Jardine with a memoir of Joseph Banks
8. 1835, Entomology: Vol. III: British Butterflies, by James Duncan with a memoir of Abraham Gottlob Werner
9. 1836, The Natural History of Parrots, by Prideaux J. Selby with plates by Edward Lear and a memoir of Thomas Bewick
10. 1836, Mammalia: Vol. V: Pachyderms, by Jardine with a memoir of Hans Sloane
11. 1836, The Natural History of British Moths, Sphinxes, &c., by James Duncan with a memoir of Maria Sibylla Merian
12. 1837, The Natural History of the Ordinary Cetacea or Whales, by Jardine with a memoir of Bernard Germain de Lacépède
13. 1837, The Natural History of Foreign Butterflies, by James Duncan with a memoir of Jean-Baptiste Lamarck
14. 1837, The Natural History of the Birds of Western Africa, by William Swainson with a memoir of François Levaillant
15. 1838, The Natural History of the Birds of Great Britain and Ireland: Part I: Birds of Prey, by Jardine with a memoir of Robert Sibbald
16. 1838, The Natural Arrangement and Relations of the Family of Flycatchers or Muscicapidae, by William Swainson with a memoir of Albrecht von Haller
17. 1838, A History of British Quadrupeds, by William MacGillivray with a memoir of Ulisse Aldrovandi
18. 1839, The Natural History of the Amphibious Carnivora, Including the Walrus and Seals, Also of the Herbivorous Cetacea, &c., by Robert Hamilton with a memoir of François Péron
19. 1839, The Natural History of Dogs: Canidae or Genus Canis of Authors: Including Also the Genera Hyaena and Proteles: Vol. I, by Chas. Hamilton Smith with a memoir of Peter Simon Pallas
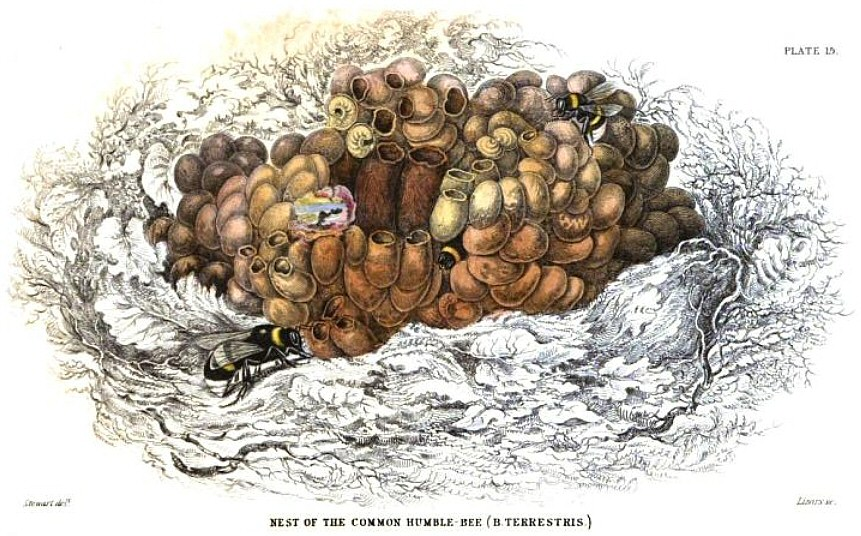
  "Nest of the Common Humble-Bee (B. terrestris)", engraved by William Home Lizars
20. 1840, The Natural History of Dogs: Canidae or Genus Canis of Authors: Including Also the Genera Hyaena and Proteles: Vol. II, by Chas. Hamilton Smith with a memoir of Félix de Azara
21. 1840, Introduction to Entomology, by James Duncan with memoirs of Jan Swammerdam and Charles De Geer
22. 1841, The Natural History of Marsupialia or Pouched Animals, by G. R. Waterhouse with a memoir of John Barclay
23. 1841, The Natural History of Horses: The Equidae or Genus Equus of Authors, by Chas. Hamilton Smith with a memoir of Conrad Gessner
24. 1841, The Natural History of the Fishes of Guiana: Part I, by Robert H. Schomburgk
25. 1841, The Natural History of Exotic Moths, by James Duncan with a memoir of Pierre André Latreille
26. 1842, The Natural History of the Birds of Great Britain and Ireland: Part III: Rasores and Grallatores, by Jardine with a memoir of John Walker
27. 1842, An Introduction to the Mammalia, by Charles Hamilton Smith with a memoir of Dru Drury
28. 1843, Ichthyology: Fishes, Particularly Their Structure and Economical Uses, by J. S. Bushnan with a memoir of Hippolito Salviani
29. 1843, The Natural History of the Fishes of Guiana: Part II, by Robert H. Schomburgk with a memoir of Johann Ludwig Burckhardt
30. 1844, The Natural History of Game-Birds, by Jardine with a memoir of Stamford Raffles
31. 1852, The Natural History of Beetles, by James Duncan with a memoir of John Ray
32. undated, Ornithology: Pigeons, by Prideaux John Selby with a memoir of Pliny the Elder
33. 1859, Entomology: Bees, by Jardine with a memoir of François Huber
34. 1860, Ichthyology: British Fishes: Part I, by Robert Hamilton with a memoir of Guillaume Rondelet
35. 1860, Ornithology: Birds of Great Britain and Ireland: Part IV, by Jardine with a memoir of Alexander Wilson
36. 1862, Ornithology: Birds of Western Africa: Part I, by W. Swainson with a memoir of James Bruce
37. 1864, The Natural History of the Nectariniadae, or Sun-Birds, by Jardine with a memoir of Francis Willughby
38. 1866, Mammalia: Deer, Antelopes, Camels, &c., by Jardine with a memoir of Petrus Camper
39. 1866, Mammalia: Goats, Sheep, Oxen, &c., by Jardine with a memoir of John Hunter
40. 1866, Ornithology: Parrots, by Prideaux John Selby with a memoir of Thomas Bewick
41. 1866, Ornithology: Birds of Great Britain and Ireland: Part II, by Jardine with a memoir of William Smellie

Later supplements include the following titles: The Natural History of Man, Humming Birds Volume 3 and a single volume that collated the memoirs of "great naturalists".

== See also ==
- Category:Taxa named by Sir William Jardine
- Jardine baronets

Baronetage of Nova Scotia
Preceded by Alexander Jardine	Baronet (of Applegirth); 1821–1874	Succeeded by Alexander Jardine
