= Blerina =

Scientific classification
- Kingdom: Animalia
- Phylum: Arthropoda
- Class: Insecta
- Order: Diptera
- Superfamily: Syrphoidea
- Family: Syrphidae
- Subfamily: Eristalinae
- Tribe: Milesiini
- Subtribe: Blerina

Genus of flies

Blerina is a subtribe of hoverfly in the family Syrphidae.

== Genera ==
- Blera Billberg, 1820
- Caliprobola Rondani, 1845
- Cynorhinella Curran, 1922
- Lejota Rondani, 1857
- Philippimyia Shannon, 1926
- Somula Macquart, 1847
