= Somula mississippiensis =

Scientific classification
- Kingdom: Animalia
- Phylum: Arthropoda
- Class: Insecta
- Order: Diptera
- Family: Syrphidae
- Subfamily: Eristalinae
- Tribe: Milesiini
- Subtribe: Blerina
- Genus: Somula
- Species: S. mississippiensis

Binomial name
- Somula mississippiensis Hull, 1922

Synonyms
- Somula marivirginiae Brimley, 1923

Species of fly

Somula mississippiensis is a species of syrphid fly in the family Syrphidae.

== Distribution ==
United States.
