= Philippimyia cyanocephala =

Scientific classification
- Kingdom: Animalia
- Phylum: Arthropoda
- Class: Insecta
- Order: Diptera
- Family: Syrphidae
- Subfamily: Eristalinae
- Tribe: Milesiini
- Subtribe: Blerina
- Genus: Philippimyia
- Species: P. cyanocephala

Binomial name
- Philippimyia cyanocephala (Philippi, 1865)

Synonyms
- Sterphus cyanocephala Philippi, 1865

Species of fly

Philippimyia cyanocephala is a species of hoverfly in the family Syrphidae.

== Distribution ==
Chile.
