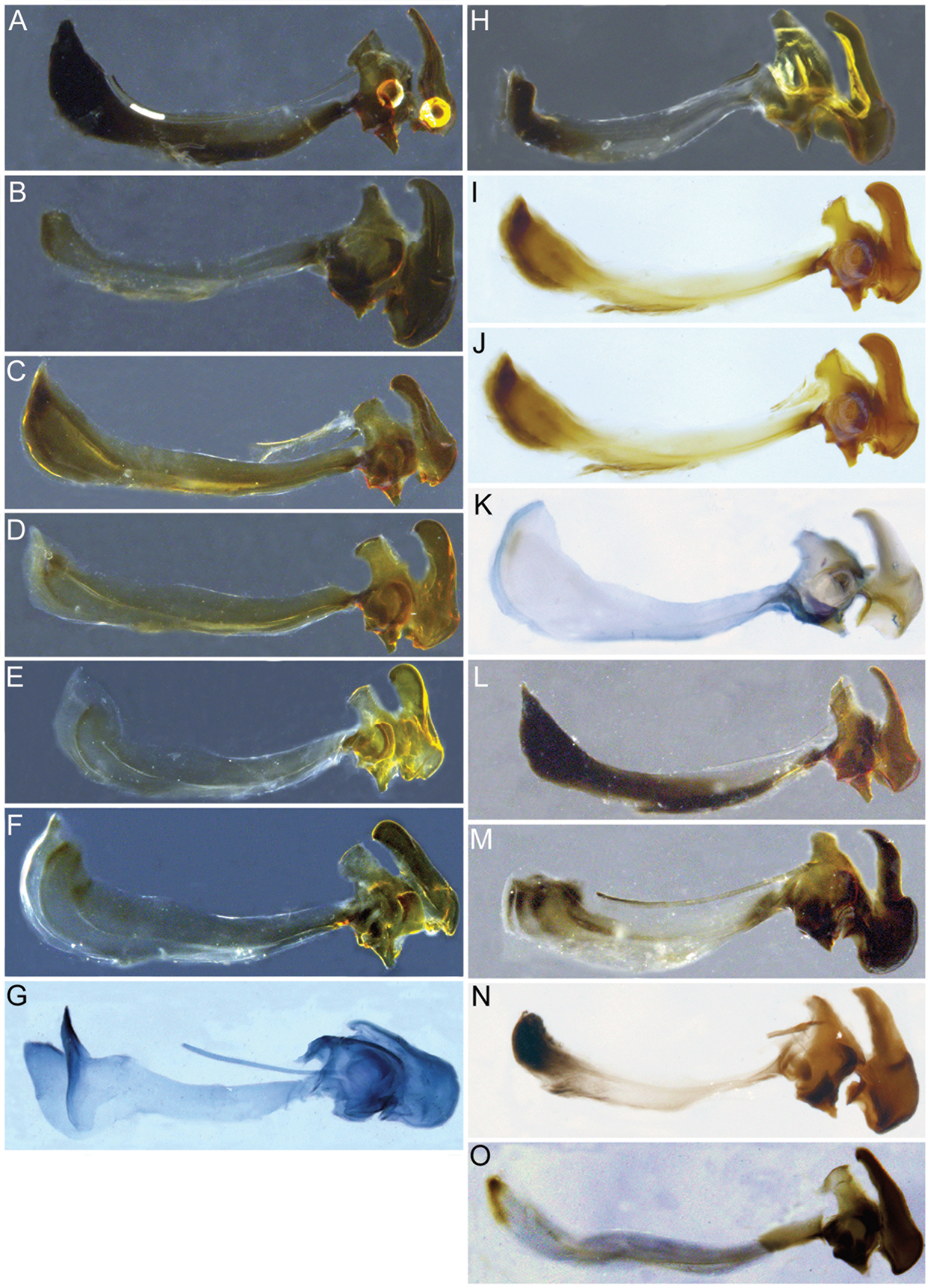

Scientific classification
- Kingdom: Animalia
- Phylum: Arthropoda
- Class: Insecta
- Order: Diptera
- Family: Syrphidae
- Subfamily: Eristalinae
- Tribe: Milesiini
- Subtribe: Criorhinina
- Genus: Sphecomyia
- Species: S. columbiana

Binomial name
- Sphecomyia columbiana Vockeroth, 1965

= Sphecomyia columbiana =

Species of fly

Sphecomyia columbiana is a species of syrphid fly in the family Syrphidae.

== Distribution ==
Canada.
