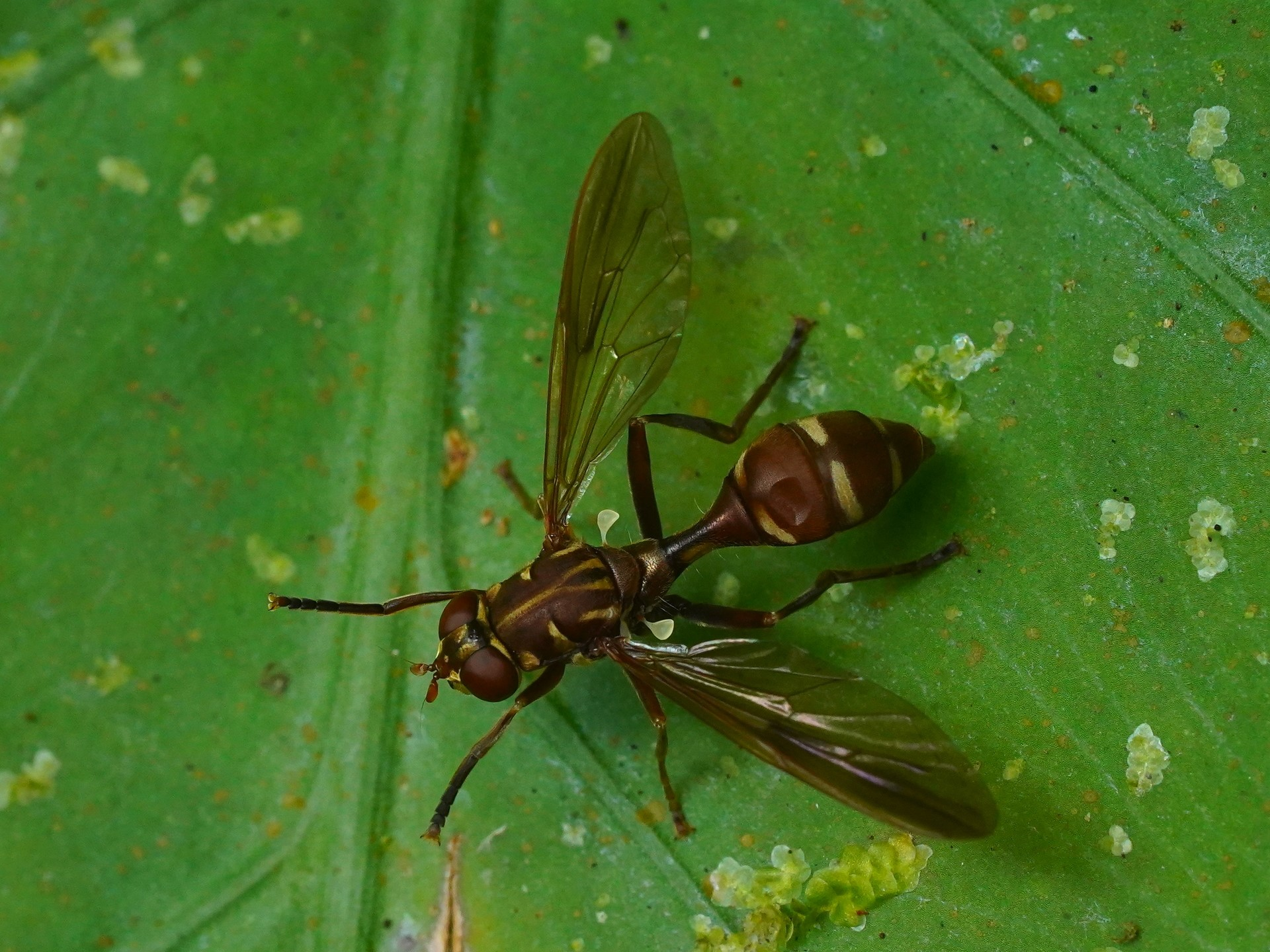

Scientific classification
- Kingdom: Animalia
- Phylum: Arthropoda
- Clade: Pancrustacea
- Class: Insecta
- Order: Diptera
- Family: Syrphidae
- Subfamily: Eristalinae
- Tribe: Milesiini
- Subtribe: Temnostomina
- Genus: Takaomyia
- Species: T. johannis

Binomial name
- Takaomyia johannis Hervé-Bazin, 1914

= Takaomyia johannis =

Species of fly

Takaomyia johannis is a species of hoverfly in the family Syrphidae.

It is the type species for the genus Takaomyia, which was established by the entomologist J. Hervé-Bazin in 1914.

== Distribution ==
Taiwan, Thailand, Japan.
