= Malometasternum rufocaudata =

Scientific classification
- Kingdom: Animalia
- Phylum: Arthropoda
- Clade: Pancrustacea
- Class: Insecta
- Order: Diptera
- Family: Syrphidae
- Subfamily: Eristalinae
- Tribe: Milesiini
- Subtribe: Criorhinina
- Genus: Malometasternum
- Species: M. rufocaudata

Binomial name
- Malometasternum rufocaudata (Ferguson, 1926)

Synonyms
- Criorrhina rufocaudata Ferguson, 1926; Malometasternum scutellaris Shannon, 1927

Species of fly

Malometasternum rufocaudata is a species of hoverfly in the family Syrphidae.

== Distribution ==
Australia.
