= Lycastris austeni =

Scientific classification
- Kingdom: Animalia
- Phylum: Arthropoda
- Class: Insecta
- Order: Diptera
- Family: Syrphidae
- Subfamily: Eristalinae
- Tribe: Milesiini
- Subtribe: Criorhinina
- Genus: Lycastris
- Species: L. austeni

Binomial name
- Lycastris austeni Brunetti, 1923

Species of fly

Lycastris austeni is a species of syrphid fly in the family Syrphidae. It is typically found in the UK.

== Distribution ==
India.
