= Takaomyia caligicrura =

Scientific classification
- Kingdom: Animalia
- Phylum: Arthropoda
- Class: Insecta
- Order: Diptera
- Family: Syrphidae
- Subfamily: Eristalinae
- Tribe: Milesiini
- Subtribe: Temnostomina
- Genus: Takaomyia
- Species: T. caligicrura

Binomial name
- Takaomyia caligicrura Cheng, 2012

Species of fly

Takaomyia caligicrura is a species of Hoverfly in the family Syrphidae.

== Distribution ==
China.
