= Deineches nudiventris =

Scientific classification
- Kingdom: Animalia
- Phylum: Arthropoda
- Clade: Pancrustacea
- Class: Insecta
- Order: Diptera
- Family: Syrphidae
- Subfamily: Eristalinae
- Tribe: Milesiini
- Subtribe: Criorhinina
- Genus: Deineches
- Species: D. nudiventris

Binomial name
- Deineches nudiventris (Macquart, 1846)

Synonyms
- Criorrhina nudiventris Macquart, 1846; Deineches nigrofulva Walker, 1852

Species of fly

Deineches nudiventris is a species of hoverfly in the family Syrphidae.

== Distribution ==
Australia.
