= Pterallastes bettyae =

Scientific classification
- Kingdom: Animalia
- Phylum: Arthropoda
- Class: Insecta
- Order: Diptera
- Family: Syrphidae
- Subfamily: Eristalinae
- Tribe: Milesiini
- Subtribe: Temnostomina
- Genus: Pterallastes
- Species: P. bettyae

Binomial name
- Pterallastes bettyae Thompson, 1979

Species of fly

Pterallastes bettyae is a species of hoverfly in the family Syrphidae.

== Distribution ==
China.
