= Pterallastes unicolor =

Scientific classification
- Kingdom: Animalia
- Phylum: Arthropoda
- Class: Insecta
- Order: Diptera
- Family: Syrphidae
- Subfamily: Eristalinae
- Tribe: Milesiini
- Subtribe: Temnostomina
- Genus: Pterallastes
- Species: P. unicolor

Binomial name
- Pterallastes unicolor Shiraki, 1930

Synonyms
- Pseudozetterstedtia unicolor Shiraki, 1930

Species of fly

Pterallastes unicolor is a species of hoverfly in the family Syrphidae.

== Distribution ==
Japan.
