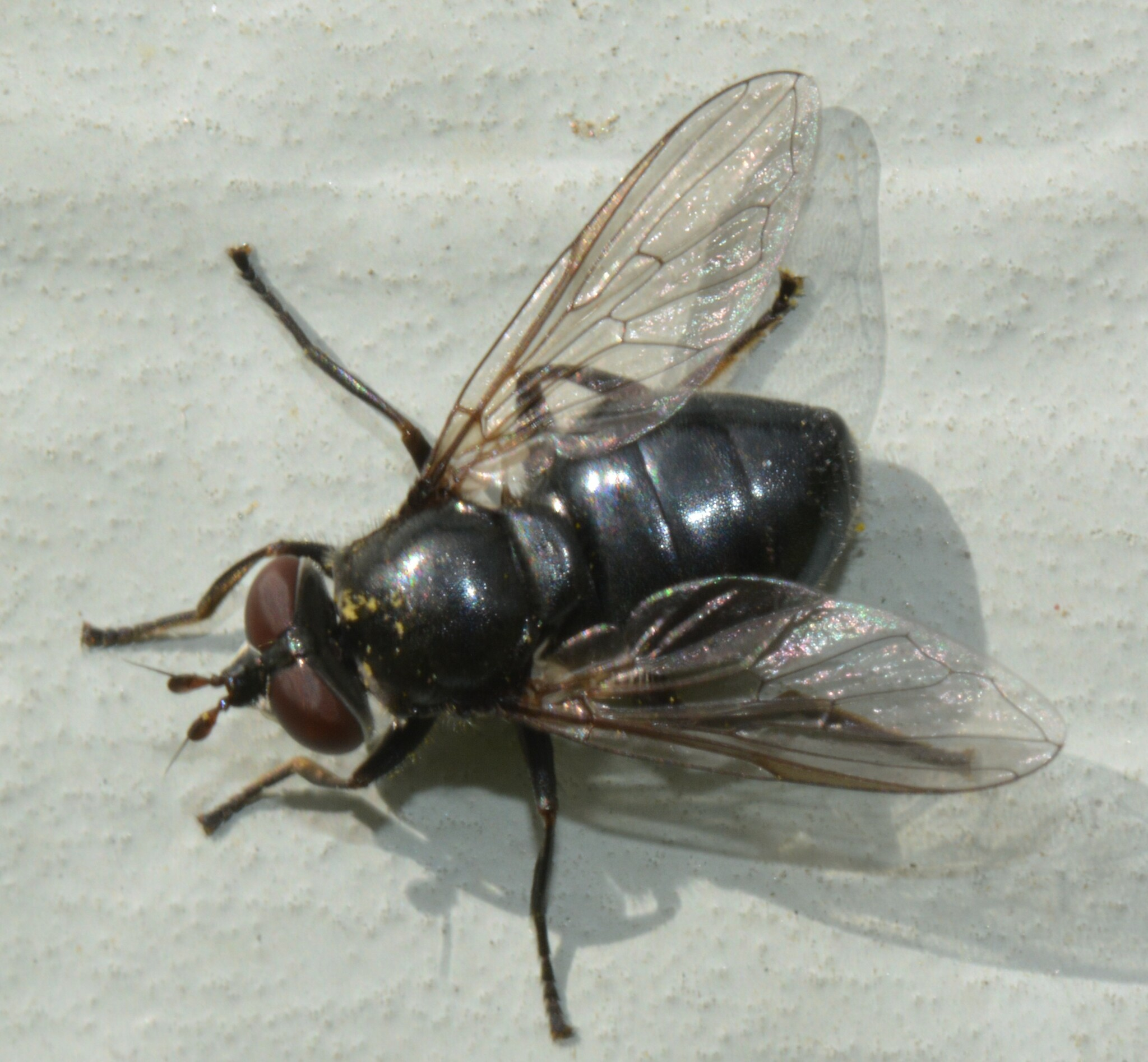

Scientific classification
- Kingdom: Animalia
- Phylum: Arthropoda
- Class: Insecta
- Order: Diptera
- Family: Syrphidae
- Subfamily: Eristalinae
- Tribe: Milesiini
- Genus: Lejota
- Species: L. cyanea

Binomial name
- Lejota cyanea (Smith, 1912)

Synonyms
- Chalcomyia calcitrans Curran, 1922; Chalcomyia cyaneus Smith, 1912; Cynorhina bigelowi Curran, 1924

= Lejota cyanea =

Species of fly

Lejota cyanea, commonly known as the cobalt trunksitter, is an uncommon species of syrphid fly observed in the northeast and west coast of North America. Hoverflies can remain nearly motionless in flight. The adults are also known as flower flies for they are commonly found on flowers, from which they get both energy-giving nectar and protein-rich pollen. The larvae of this genus are found in decaying tree roots.

== Distribution ==
Canada, United States.
