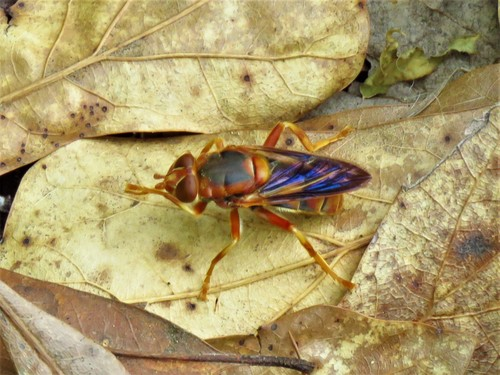
- Teuchocnemis bacuntius

Scientific classification
- Kingdom: Animalia
- Phylum: Arthropoda
- Class: Insecta
- Order: Diptera
- Family: Syrphidae
- Subfamily: Eristalinae
- Tribe: Milesiini
- Subtribe: Temnostomina
- Genus: Teuchocnemis
- Species: T. bacuntius

Binomial name
- Teuchocnemis bacuntius (Walker, 1849)

Synonyms
- Milesia bacuntius Walker, 1849

= Teuchocnemis bacuntius =

Species of fly

Teuchocnemis bacuntius is a rare species of syrphid fly observed in eastern half of the United States.

== Distribution ==
A book from 1887 mentions the species has been found in Georgia and Texas in the United States.

== Description ==
Adults are 13.5–18.1 mm (0.53–0.71 in) long, orange with a swollen hind femur and the hind tibia of the male with a ventral spur. The larvae are unknown.
