= Lejota aerea =

Scientific classification
- Kingdom: Animalia
- Phylum: Arthropoda
- Class: Insecta
- Order: Diptera
- Family: Syrphidae
- Subfamily: Eristalinae
- Tribe: Milesiini
- Genus: Lejota
- Species: L. aerea

Binomial name
- Lejota aerea (Loew, 1872)

Synonyms
- Myiolepta aerea Loew, 1872; Myiolepta aera Williston, 1872

Species of fly

Lejota aerea (Loew 1872), the Golden Trunksitter , is an uncommon species of syrphid fly observed in eastern North America. Hoverflies can remain nearly motionless in flight. The adults are also known as flower flies for they are commonly found on flowers, from which they get both energy-giving nectar and protein-rich pollen. The larvae of this genus are found in decaying tree roots.

== Distribution ==
United States.
