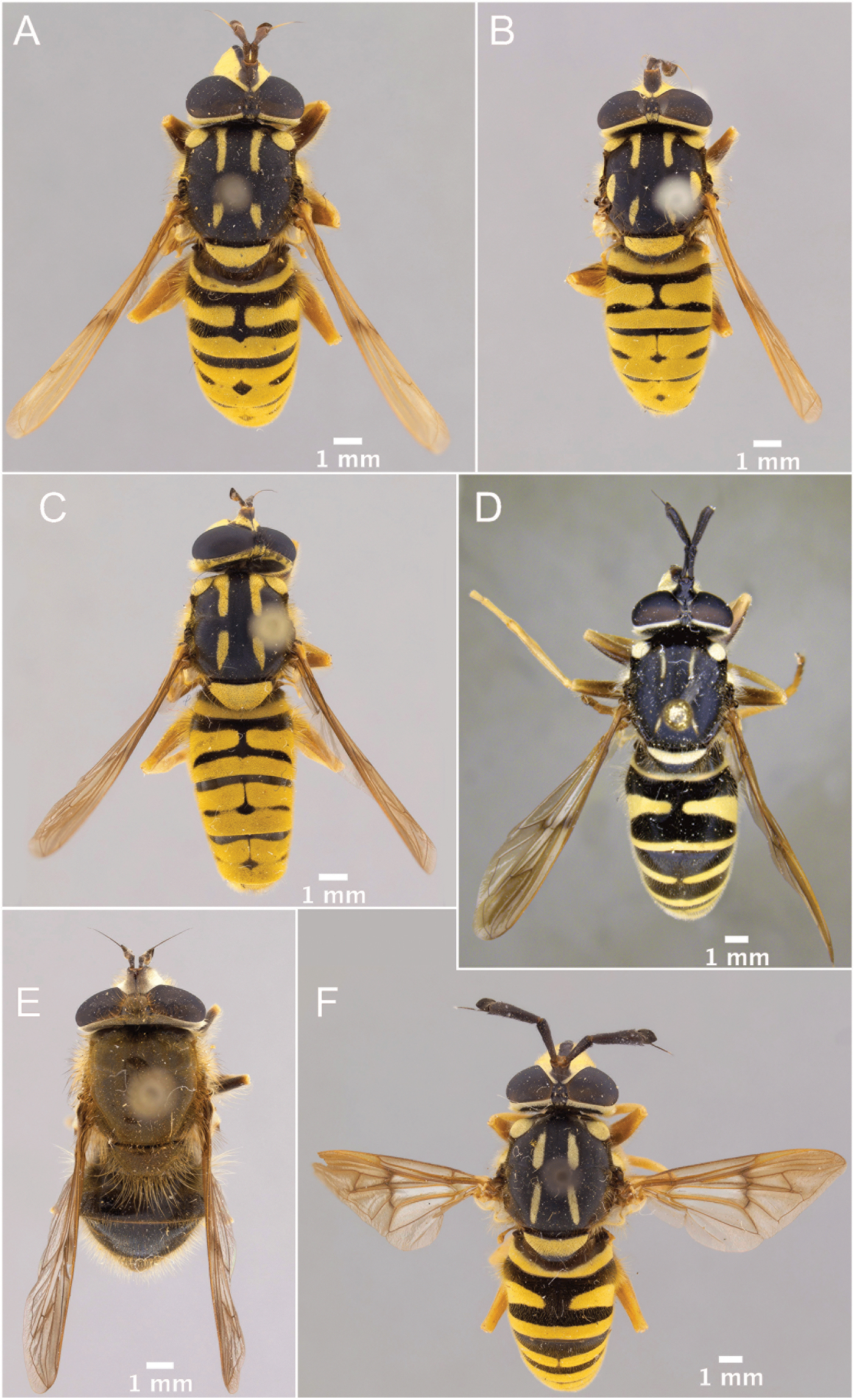
- Sphecomyia species. Sphecomyia vespiformis is labelled D

Scientific classification
- Kingdom: Animalia
- Phylum: Arthropoda
- Class: Insecta
- Order: Diptera
- Family: Syrphidae
- Subfamily: Eristalinae
- Tribe: Milesiini
- Subtribe: Criorhinina
- Genus: Sphecomyia
- Species: S. vespiformis

Binomial name
- Sphecomyia vespiformis Gorski, 1852

Synonyms
- Tyzenhauzia vespiformis Gorski, 1852

= Sphecomyia vespiformis =

Species of fly

Sphecomyia vespiformis is a species of syrphid fly in the family Syrphidae.

== Distribution ==
Lithuania.
