= Sphecomyia interrupta =

Scientific classification
- Kingdom: Animalia
- Phylum: Arthropoda
- Class: Insecta
- Order: Diptera
- Family: Syrphidae
- Subfamily: Eristalinae
- Tribe: Milesiini
- Subtribe: Criorhinina
- Genus: Sphecomyia
- Species: S. interrupta

Binomial name
- Sphecomyia interrupta Moran, 2019

Species of fly

Sphecomyia interrupta is a species of syrphid fly in the family Syrphidae.

== Distribution ==
United States.
