= Antonio Schembri =

Antonio Schembri may refer to:

- Nino Schembri (born 1974), Brazilian mixed martial artist
- Antonio Schembri (ornithologist) (1813–1872), Maltese ornithologist (he published in Italian)
