= Sphecomyia metallica =

Scientific classification
- Kingdom: Animalia
- Phylum: Arthropoda
- Class: Insecta
- Order: Diptera
- Family: Syrphidae
- Subfamily: Eristalinae
- Tribe: Milesiini
- Subtribe: Criorhinina
- Genus: Sphecomyia
- Species: S. metallica

Binomial name
- Sphecomyia metallica (Bigot, 1882)

Synonyms
- Eurhinomallota metallica Bigot, 1882; Brachymyia lupina Williston, 1882; Sphecomyia metallica (Williston, 1882)

Species of fly

Sphecomyia metallica is a species of hoverfly in the family Syrphidae.

== Distribution ==
Canada, United States.
