= Sphecomyia aino =

Scientific classification
- Kingdom: Animalia
- Phylum: Arthropoda
- Class: Insecta
- Order: Diptera
- Family: Syrphidae
- Subfamily: Eristalinae
- Tribe: Milesiini
- Subtribe: Criorhinina
- Genus: Sphecomyia
- Species: S. aino

Binomial name
- Sphecomyia aino (Stackelberg, 1955)

Synonyms
- Penthesilea aino Stackelberg, 1955; Criorrhina stackelbergi Violovitsh, 1973; Criorrhina aino Mutin and Barkalov, 1990

Species of fly

Sphecomyia aino is a species of syrphid fly in the family Syrphidae.

== Distribution ==
Russia.
