= Cynorhinella bella =

Scientific classification
- Kingdom: Animalia
- Phylum: Arthropoda
- Class: Insecta
- Order: Diptera
- Superfamily: Syrphoidea
- Family: Syrphidae
- Subfamily: Eristalinae
- Tribe: Milesiini
- Genus: Cynorhinella
- Species: C. bella

Binomial name
- Cynorhinella bella (Williston, 1882)
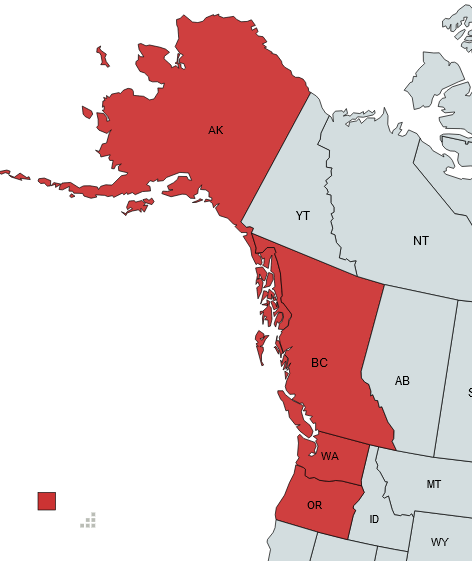

Synonyms
- Cynorhinella canadensis (Curran, 1922); Myioletpa bella Williston, 1882; Myioletpa carbicolor Lovett, 1920

Species of fly

Cynorhinella bella, the western longnose, is a species of hoverfly in the family Syrphidae.

== Description ==
Length 10 mm. Male.

Head

"Face chestnut brown, concave below the antennae with a prominent rounded tubercle about the middle, below which it is slightly produced to the not prominent oral margin; side margins well defined, as in Chilosia, the facial slopes with fine whitish pollen, the side margins with sparse whitish pile; cheeks and frontal triangle shining, concolorous with the face; vertical triangle brown, the sides of the triangle about equal, with brown pile; occiput shining chestnut, with whitish pile below and brownish above. "

Thorax

" shining blueblack, the dorsum with yellow pile, which is intermixed with black on the middle, and black pile on the borders; pleurae yellowish brown, with yel- lowish pile, the pile black above. Scutellum concolorous with dorsum, with slightly longer black pile. " "Abdomen narrow, and gradually narrowing after the second segment, in color shining blue-black, the posterior margins of the second and third segments a little more blackish on the median two-thirds; hypopygium black. Pile of abdomen yellowish on basal angles, becoming white en the hypopygium, and black on the ends of the second and third segments." "Legs chestnut brown. Wings distinctly luteous (light to medium greenish tinge); stigma yellowish. Squamae and halteres white." from Williston

== Distribution ==
Canada, United States. (See range map.)
