= Sphecomyia pattonii =

Scientific classification
- Kingdom: Animalia
- Phylum: Arthropoda
- Class: Insecta
- Order: Diptera
- Family: Syrphidae
- Subfamily: Eristalinae
- Tribe: Milesiini
- Subtribe: Criorhinina
- Genus: Sphecomyia
- Species: S. pattonii

Binomial name
- Sphecomyia pattonii Williston, 1882

Synonyms
- Calliprobola calorhina Bigot, 1884

Species of fly

Sphecomyia pattonii is a species of syrphid fly in the family Syrphidae.

== Distribution ==
Canada, United States.
