= Pterallastes bomboides =

Scientific classification
- Kingdom: Animalia
- Phylum: Arthropoda
- Clade: Pancrustacea
- Class: Insecta
- Order: Diptera
- Family: Syrphidae
- Subfamily: Eristalinae
- Tribe: Milesiini
- Subtribe: Temnostomina
- Genus: Pterallastes
- Species: P. bomboides

Binomial name
- Pterallastes bomboides Thompson, 1974

Species of fly

Pterallastes bomboides is a species of hoverfly in the family Syrphidae.

== Distribution ==
It is natively distributed across east asia, mainly found in China in sichuan province , this represents what entomologist consider plesiomorphic. It lives in temperate, high elevated forests, valleys and sunny woodland margins where bumblebees are abundant..
