= Macrometopia montensis =

Scientific classification
- Kingdom: Animalia
- Phylum: Arthropoda
- Class: Insecta
- Order: Diptera
- Family: Syrphidae
- Subfamily: Eristalinae
- Tribe: Milesiini
- Subtribe: Xylotina
- Genus: Macrometopia
- Species: M. montensis

Binomial name
- Macrometopia montensis (Hull, 1938)

Synonyms
- Nosodepus montensis Hull, 1938

Species of fly

Macrometopia montensis is a species of hoverfly in the family Syrphidae.

== Distribution ==
Venezuela.
