= Macrometopia atra =

Scientific classification
- Kingdom: Animalia
- Phylum: Arthropoda
- Class: Insecta
- Order: Diptera
- Family: Syrphidae
- Subfamily: Eristalinae
- Tribe: Milesiini
- Subtribe: Xylotina
- Genus: Macrometopia
- Species: M. atra

Binomial name
- Macrometopia atra Philippi, 1865

Species of fly

Macrometopia atra is a species of hoverfly in the family Syrphidae.

== Distribution ==
The species can be found in Chile and Argentina.
