= Flukea vockerothi =

Scientific classification
- Kingdom: Animalia
- Phylum: Arthropoda
- Class: Insecta
- Order: Diptera
- Family: Syrphidae
- Subfamily: Eristalinae
- Tribe: Milesiini
- Subtribe: Criorhinina
- Genus: Flukea
- Species: F. vockerothi

Binomial name
- Flukea vockerothi Etcheverry, 1966

Species of fly

Flukea vockerothi is a species of hoverfly in the family Syrphidae.

== Distribution ==
Chile.
