= Caliprobola aurea =

Scientific classification
- Kingdom: Animalia
- Phylum: Arthropoda
- Class: Insecta
- Order: Diptera
- Family: Syrphidae
- Subfamily: Eristalinae
- Tribe: Milesiini
- Genus: Caliprobola
- Species: C. aurea

Binomial name
- Caliprobola aurea Sack, 1910

Species of fly

Caliprobola aurea is a species of hoverfly in the family Syrphidae.

== Distribution ==
The species is found in Turkmenistan.
