= Lycastris cornuta =

Scientific classification
- Kingdom: Animalia
- Phylum: Arthropoda
- Class: Insecta
- Order: Diptera
- Family: Syrphidae
- Subfamily: Eristalinae
- Tribe: Milesiini
- Subtribe: Criorhinina
- Genus: Lycastris
- Species: L. cornuta

Binomial name
- Lycastris cornuta Enderlein, 1910

Species of fly

Lycastris cornuta is a species of syrphid fly in the family Syrphidae.

== Distribution ==
Taiwan.
