= Lejota femoralis =

Scientific classification
- Kingdom: Animalia
- Phylum: Arthropoda
- Class: Insecta
- Order: Diptera
- Family: Syrphidae
- Subfamily: Eristalinae
- Tribe: Milesiini
- Genus: Lejota
- Species: L. femoralis

Binomial name
- Lejota femoralis (Shiraki, 1968)

Synonyms
- Myolepta femoralis Shiraki, 1968

Species of fly

Lejota femoralis is a species of syrphid fly in the family Syrphidae.

== Distribution ==
It is from Japan.
