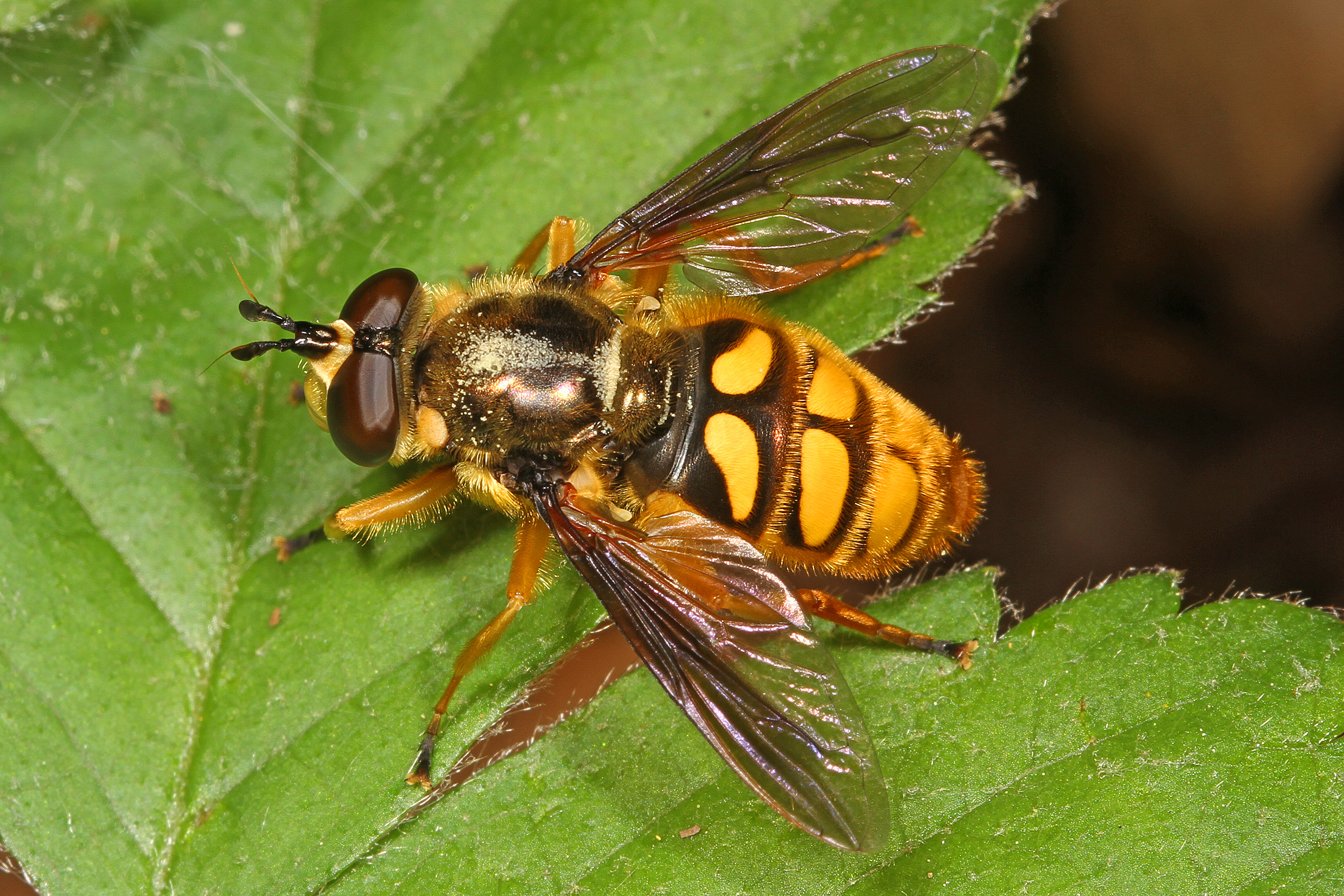

Scientific classification
- Kingdom: Animalia
- Phylum: Arthropoda
- Class: Insecta
- Order: Diptera
- Family: Syrphidae
- Subfamily: Eristalinae
- Tribe: Milesiini
- Subtribe: Blerina
- Genus: Somula
- Species: S. decora

Binomial name
- Somula decora Macquart, 1847

= Somula decora =

Species of fly

Somula decora, commonly known as the spotted wood fly, is an uncommon species of syrphid fly observed in central to eastern North America. Hoverflies can remain nearly motionless in flight. The adults are also known as flower flies for they are commonly found on flowers, from which they get both energy-giving nectar and protein-rich pollen. The larvae live in decaying wood.

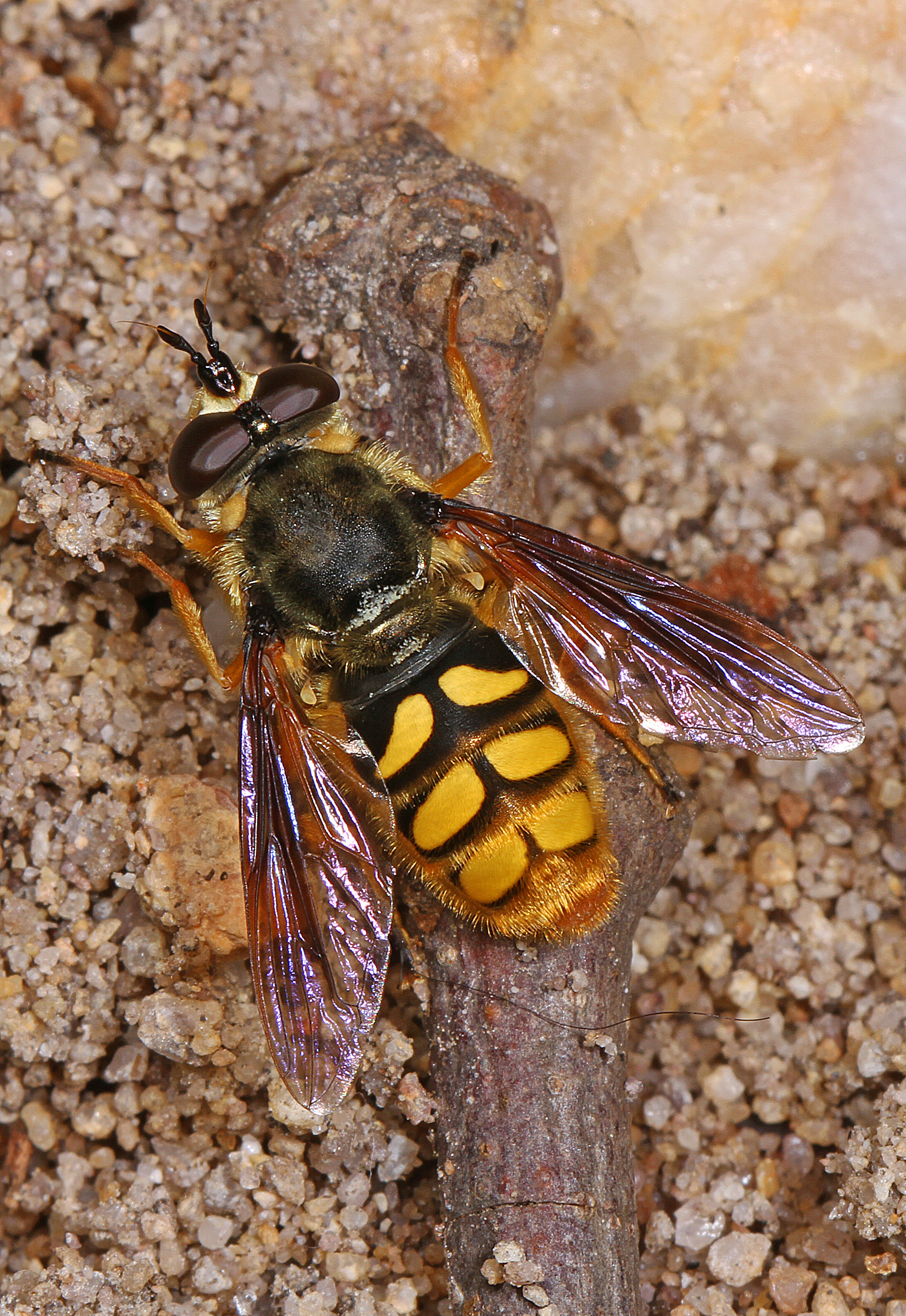

== Distribution ==
Canada, United States.
