= Sphecomyia pseudosphecomima =

Scientific classification
- Kingdom: Animalia
- Phylum: Arthropoda
- Class: Insecta
- Order: Diptera
- Family: Syrphidae
- Subfamily: Eristalinae
- Tribe: Milesiini
- Subtribe: Criorhinina
- Genus: Sphecomyia
- Species: S. pseudosphecomima

Binomial name
- Sphecomyia pseudosphecomima Moran, 2019

Species of fly

Sphecomyia pseudosphecomima is a species of syrphid fly in the family Syrphidae.

== Distribution ==
United States.
