= Lejota villosa =

Scientific classification
- Kingdom: Animalia
- Phylum: Arthropoda
- Class: Insecta
- Order: Diptera
- Family: Syrphidae
- Subfamily: Eristalinae
- Tribe: Milesiini
- Genus: Lejota
- Species: L. villosa

Binomial name
- Lejota villosa Violovitsh, 1982

Species of fly

Lejota villosa is a species of syrphid fly in the family Syrphidae.

== Distribution ==
Russia.
