= Sphecomyia brevicornis =

Scientific classification
- Domain: Eukaryota
- Kingdom: Animalia
- Phylum: Arthropoda
- Class: Insecta
- Order: Diptera
- Family: Syrphidae
- Subfamily: Eristalinae
- Tribe: Milesiini
- Subtribe: Criorhinina
- Genus: Sphecomyia
- Species: S. brevicornis

Binomial name
- Sphecomyia brevicornis Osten Sacken, 1877

Species of fly

Sphecomyia brevicornis is a species of syrphid fly in the family Syrphidae.

== Distribution ==
Canada, United States.
