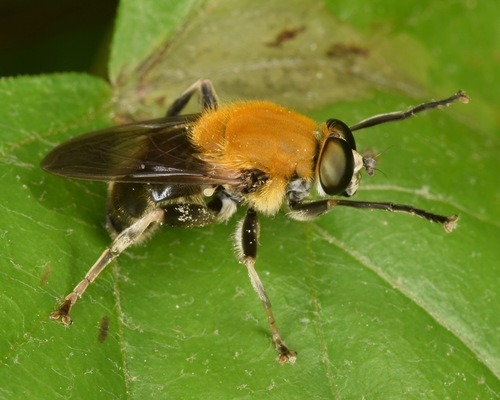
- from Canton, GA, USA

Scientific classification
- Kingdom: Animalia
- Phylum: Arthropoda
- Class: Insecta
- Order: Diptera
- Family: Syrphidae
- Subfamily: Eristalinae
- Tribe: Milesiini
- Subtribe: Temnostomina
- Genus: Pterallastes
- Species: P. thoracicus

Binomial name
- Pterallastes thoracicus Loew, 1863

= Pterallastes thoracicus =

Species of fly

Pterallastes thoracicus, the goldenback fly, is an uncommon species of syrphid fly observed across central and eastern areas of the United States. Hoverflies can remain nearly motionless in flight while many are mimics of bees. The adults are also known as flower flies for they are commonly found on flowers, from which they get both energy-giving nectar and protein-rich pollen. The larvae of this species are unknown.

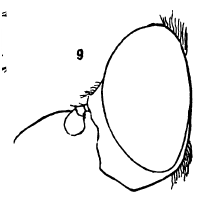
Head of male Pterallastes thoracicus

Hind leg of male Pterallastes thoracicus

== Distribution ==
United States.
