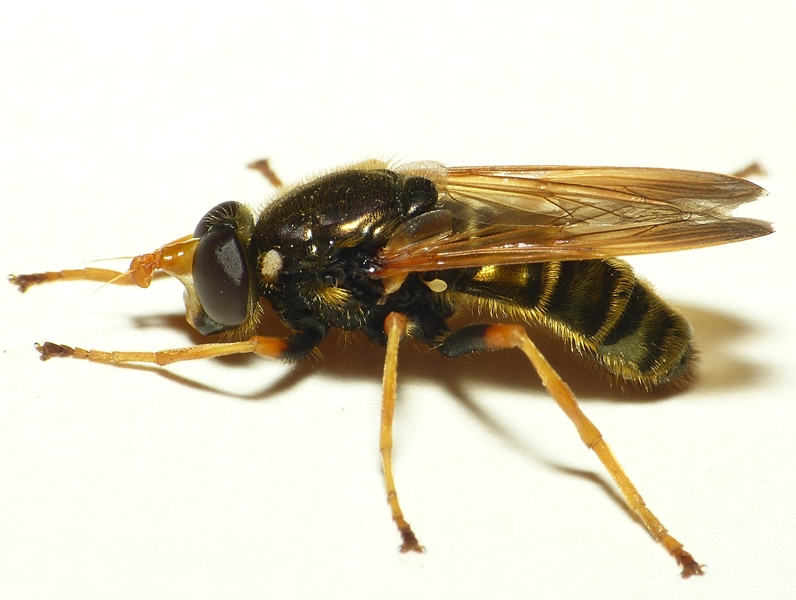
- Caliprobola speciosa Netherlands

Scientific classification
- Kingdom: Animalia
- Phylum: Arthropoda
- Clade: Pancrustacea
- Class: Insecta
- Order: Diptera
- Family: Syrphidae
- Subfamily: Eristalinae
- Tribe: Milesiini
- Genus: Caliprobola; Rondani, 1845

Type species
- Syrphus speciosa Rossi, 1790

Synonyms
- Calliprobola Rondani, 1845; Calliprobola Verrall, 1901

= Caliprobola =

Genus of flies

Caliprobola is a genus of Hoverflies, from the family Syrphidae, in the order Diptera.

== Species ==
- C. aurea Sack, 1910
- C. speciosa (Rossi, 1790)
