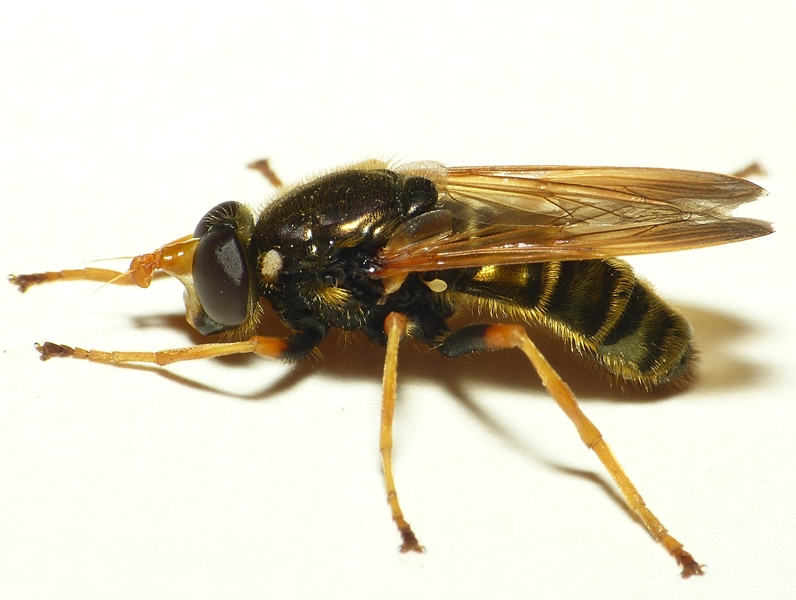
- Caliprobola speciosa Netherlands

Scientific classification
- Kingdom: Animalia
- Phylum: Arthropoda
- Clade: Pancrustacea
- Class: Insecta
- Order: Diptera
- Family: Syrphidae
- Subfamily: Eristalinae
- Tribe: Milesiini
- Genus: Caliprobola
- Species: C. speciosa

Binomial name
- Caliprobola speciosa (Rossi, 1790)

Synonyms
- Syrphus speciosa Rossi, 1790

= Caliprobola speciosa =

Species of fly

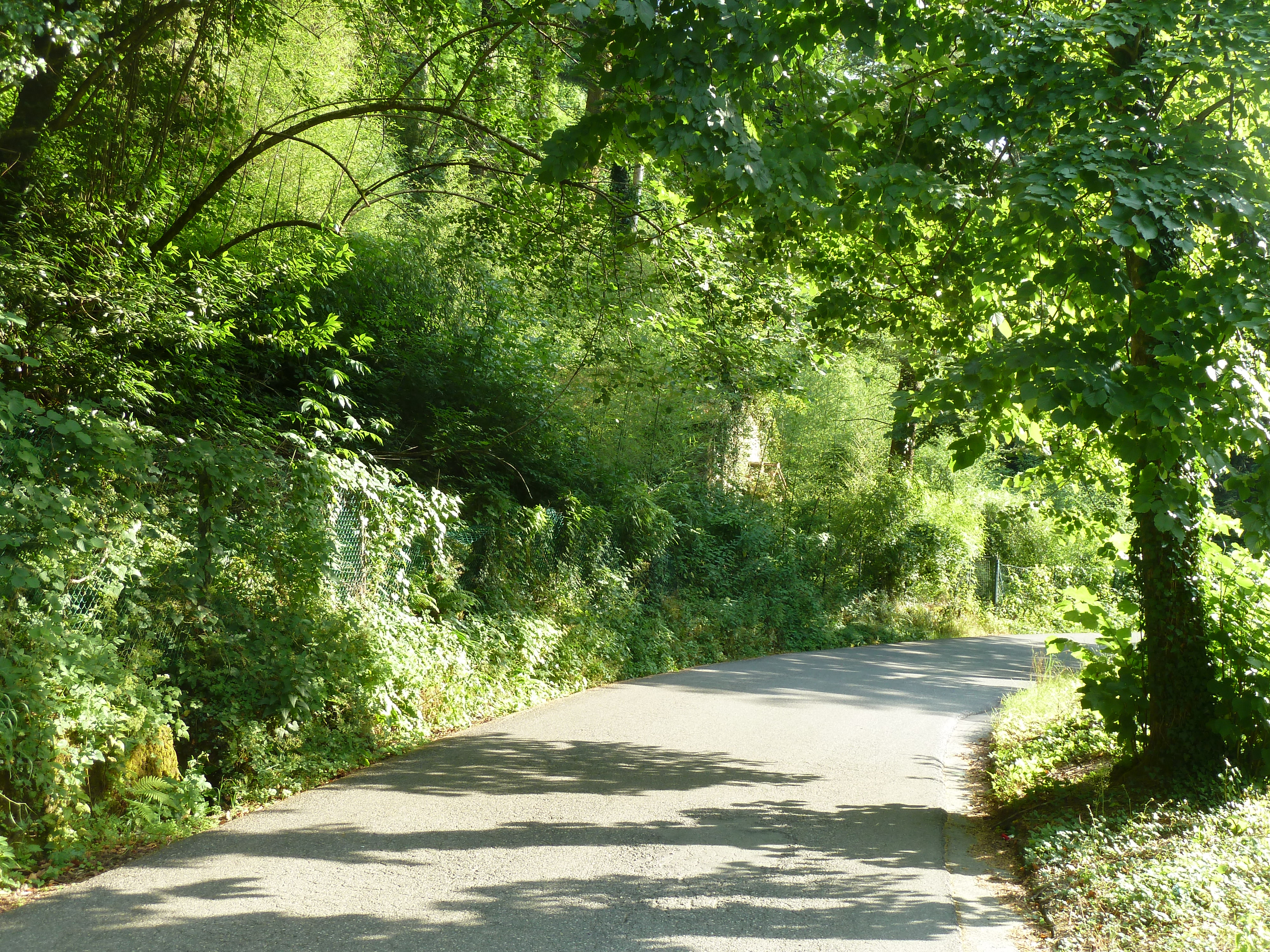
A typical habitat: chestnut woodland in Bagni di Lucca, Italy

Caliprobola speciosa is a Palearctic hoverfly. It is an ancient woodland bioindicator.

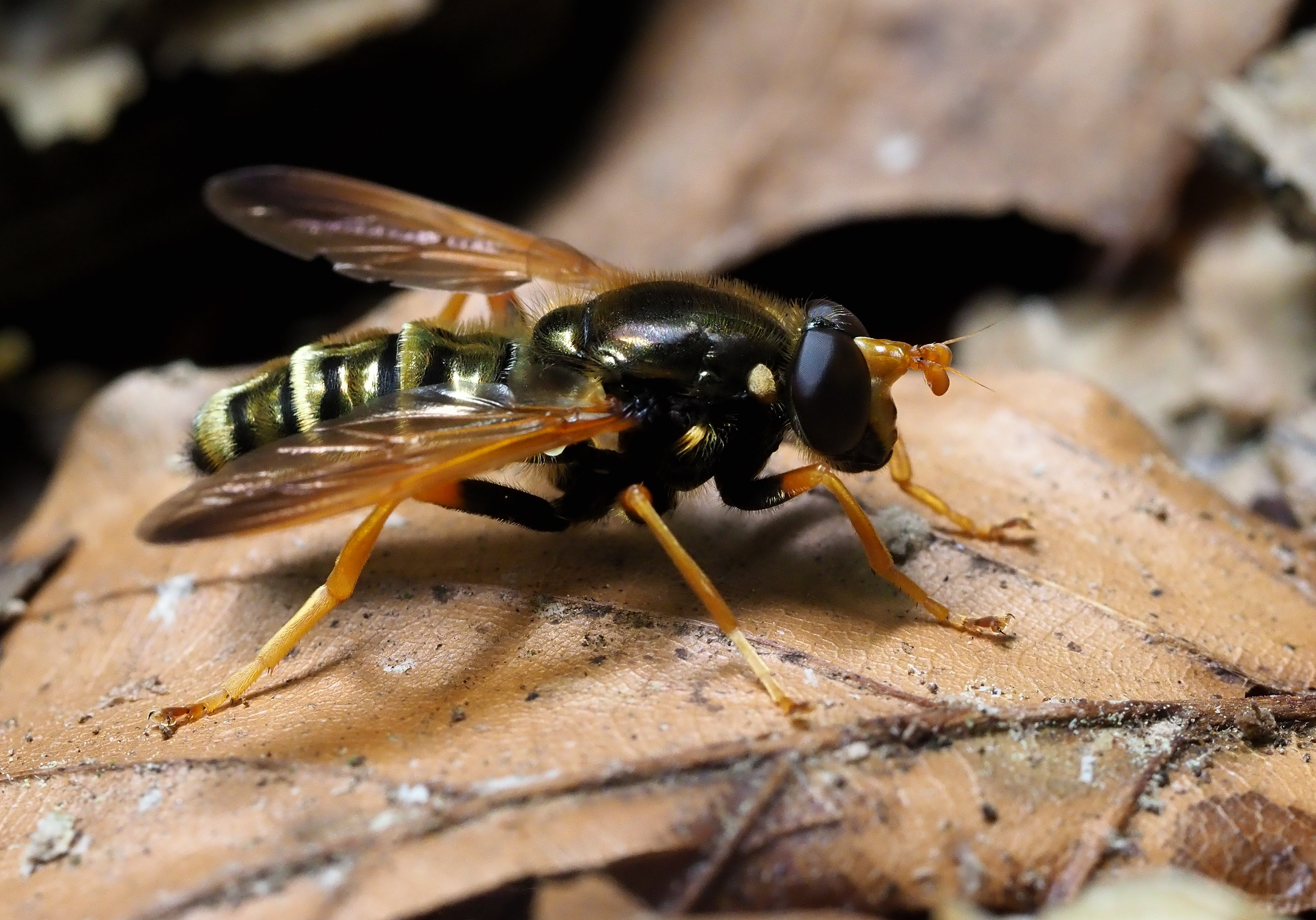
in Parc de Woluwé, Bruxelles

== Description ==
For terms see Morphology of Diptera
Caliprobola speciosa is a large slender-bodied hoverfly. The wingspan is 13–17 mm.The body is brassy aeneous or dark metallic green. The base of the abdomen is black. Tergites 2, 3 and 4 have a thin black transverse line followed by a broad metallic green band, a thin black transverse line broken in the middle and a transverse stripe of golden hairs. The prominent orange yellow frons is projecting and coned. The face is yellow. The legs are yellow, except the bases of the femora, which are black. The wings are yellowish and dark shaded at the tip. The larva is described and figured by Rotheray (1994).

== Distribution ==
Europe, from southern England to northern Spain and across the Palearctic as far as eastern Siberia. Not in Scandinavia and northern regions.

== Biology ==
The habitat is Quercus and Fagus and Castanea ancient woodland where the larvae develop in decaying stumps. Flowers visited are white umbellifers, Caltha, Crataegus, Rorippa, Rubus, Sorbus aucuparia, Tamarix. Adults fly from mid May to mid July.
