= Lejota ruficornis =

Scientific classification
- Kingdom: Animalia
- Phylum: Arthropoda
- Class: Insecta
- Order: Diptera
- Family: Syrphidae
- Subfamily: Eristalinae
- Tribe: Milesiini
- Genus: Lejota
- Species: L. ruficornis

Binomial name
- Lejota ruficornis Wahlberg, 1843

Synonyms
- Psilota ruficornis Wahlberg, 1843; Chalcomyia beckeri Shannon, 1926; Chilosia strandi Duda, 1940

Species of fly

Lejota ruficornis is a species of syrphid fly in the family Syrphidae.

== Distribution ==
Sweden.
