= Deineches fulva =

Scientific classification
- Kingdom: Animalia
- Phylum: Arthropoda
- Clade: Pancrustacea
- Class: Insecta
- Order: Diptera
- Family: Syrphidae
- Subfamily: Eristalinae
- Tribe: Milesiini
- Subtribe: Criorhinina
- Genus: Deineches
- Species: D. fulva

Binomial name
- Deineches fulva (Ferguson, 1926)

Synonyms
- Criorrhina fulva Ferguson, 1926

Species of fly

Deineches fulva is a species of hoverfly in the family Syrphidae.

== Distribution ==
Australia.
