= Deineches hackeri =

Scientific classification
- Kingdom: Animalia
- Phylum: Arthropoda
- Clade: Pancrustacea
- Class: Insecta
- Order: Diptera
- Family: Syrphidae
- Subfamily: Eristalinae
- Tribe: Milesiini
- Subtribe: Criorhinina
- Genus: Deineches
- Species: D. hackeri

Binomial name
- Deineches hackeri (Ferguson, 1926)

Synonyms
- Criorrhina hackeri Ferguson, 1926

Species of fly

Deineches hackeri is a species of hoverfly in the family Syrphidae. It is endemic to Australia.
