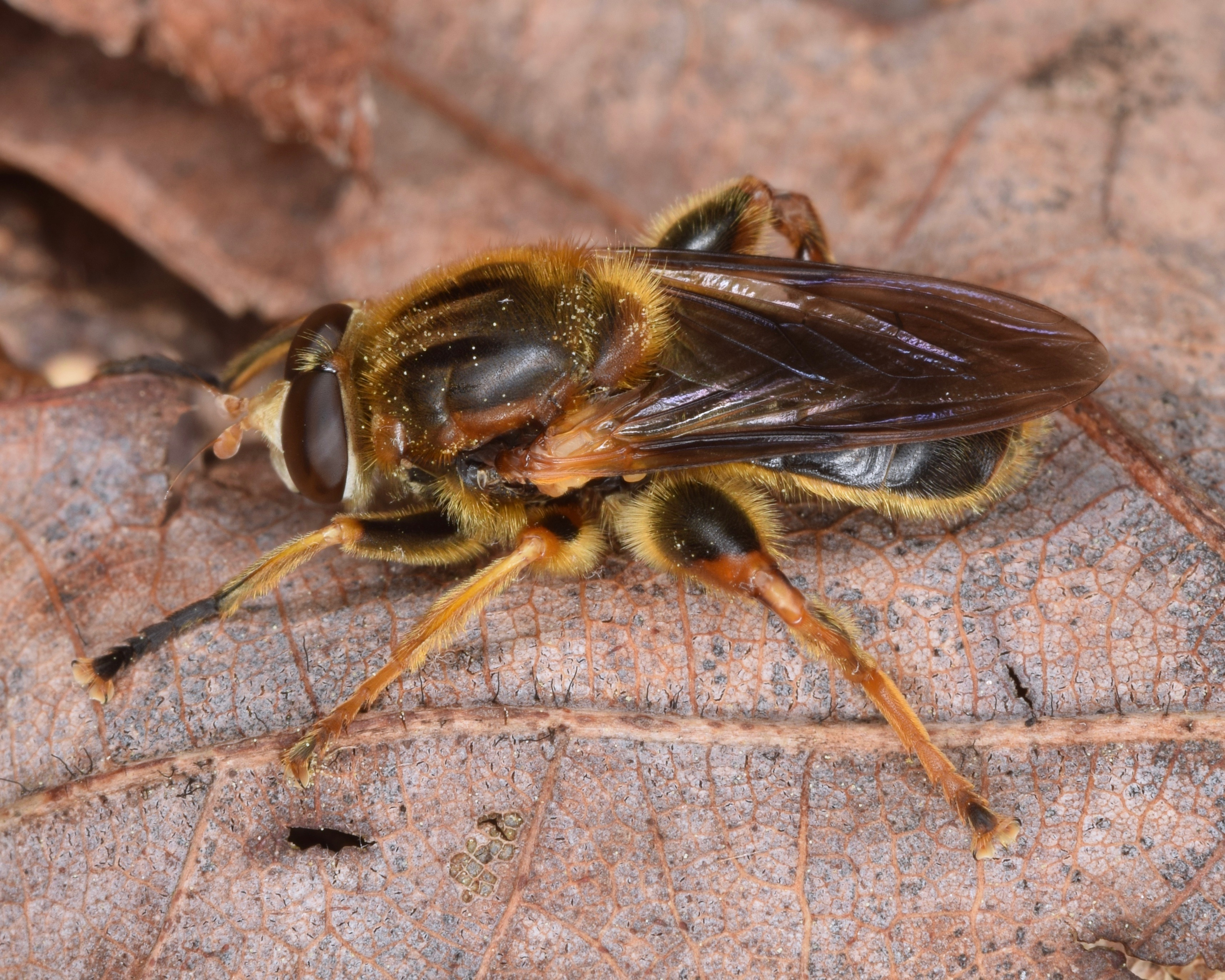

Scientific classification
- Kingdom: Animalia
- Phylum: Arthropoda
- Class: Insecta
- Order: Diptera
- Family: Syrphidae
- Subfamily: Eristalinae
- Tribe: Milesiini
- Subtribe: Temnostomina
- Genus: Teuchocnemis
- Species: T. lituratus

Binomial name
- Teuchocnemis lituratus (Loew, 1863)

Synonyms
- Pterallastes lituratus Loew, 1863

= Teuchocnemis lituratus =

Species of fly

Teuchocnemis lituratus, (Loew, 1863), the Black Spur Fly, is an uncommon species of syrphid fly observed in the eastern half of North America. Syrphid flies are also known as Hover Flies or Flower Flies because the adults are frequently found hovering around flowers from which they feed on nectar and pollen. Adults are 10.5–15.4 mm (0.41–0.61 in)long, black with a yellow scutellum and hind tibia of male with spike. The larvae are unknown.

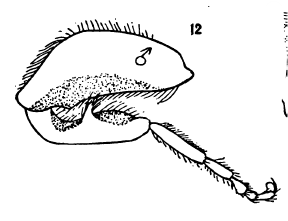
hind leg with tibia spike

== Distribution ==
Canada, United States.
