= Macrometopia maculipennis =

Scientific classification
- Kingdom: Animalia
- Phylum: Arthropoda
- Class: Insecta
- Order: Diptera
- Family: Syrphidae
- Tribe: Milesiini
- Subtribe: Xylotina
- Genus: Macrometopia
- Species: M. maculipennis

Binomial name
- Macrometopia maculipennis Thompson, 1999

Species of fly

Macrometopia maculipennis is a species of hoverfly from the family Syrphidae in the order Diptera. It was first found in Colombia and was named after its patterned wings.
