= Lycastris griseipennis =

Scientific classification
- Kingdom: Animalia
- Phylum: Arthropoda
- Class: Insecta
- Order: Diptera
- Family: Syrphidae
- Subfamily: Eristalinae
- Tribe: Milesiini
- Subtribe: Criorhinina
- Genus: Lycastris
- Species: L. griseipennis

Binomial name
- Lycastris griseipennis Coe, 1964

Species of fly

Lycastris griseipennis is a species of syrphid fly in the family Syrphidae.

== Distribution ==
India.
