= Lejota =

Scientific classification
- Kingdom: Animalia
- Phylum: Arthropoda
- Class: Insecta
- Order: Diptera
- Superfamily: Syrphoidea
- Family: Syrphidae
- Subfamily: Eristalinae
- Tribe: Milesiini
- Genus: Lejota; Rondani, 1857

Type species
- Psilota ruficornis Wahlberg, 1843

Synonyms
- Blerina Mutin, 1999; Chalcomyia Williston, 1885; Xylotoeja Rondani, 1857; Liota Scudder, 1882

Genus of flies

Lejota is a genus of syrphid flies in the family Syrphidae.

== Species ==
- L. aerea (Loew, 1872)
- L. cyanea (Smith, 1912)
- L. femoralis (Shiraki, 1968)
- L. femorata Violovitsh, 1980
- L. korsakovi (Stackelberg, 1952)
- L. ruficornis (Wahlberg, 1843)
- L. simplex (Shiraki, 1968)
- L. villosa Violovitsh, 1982
