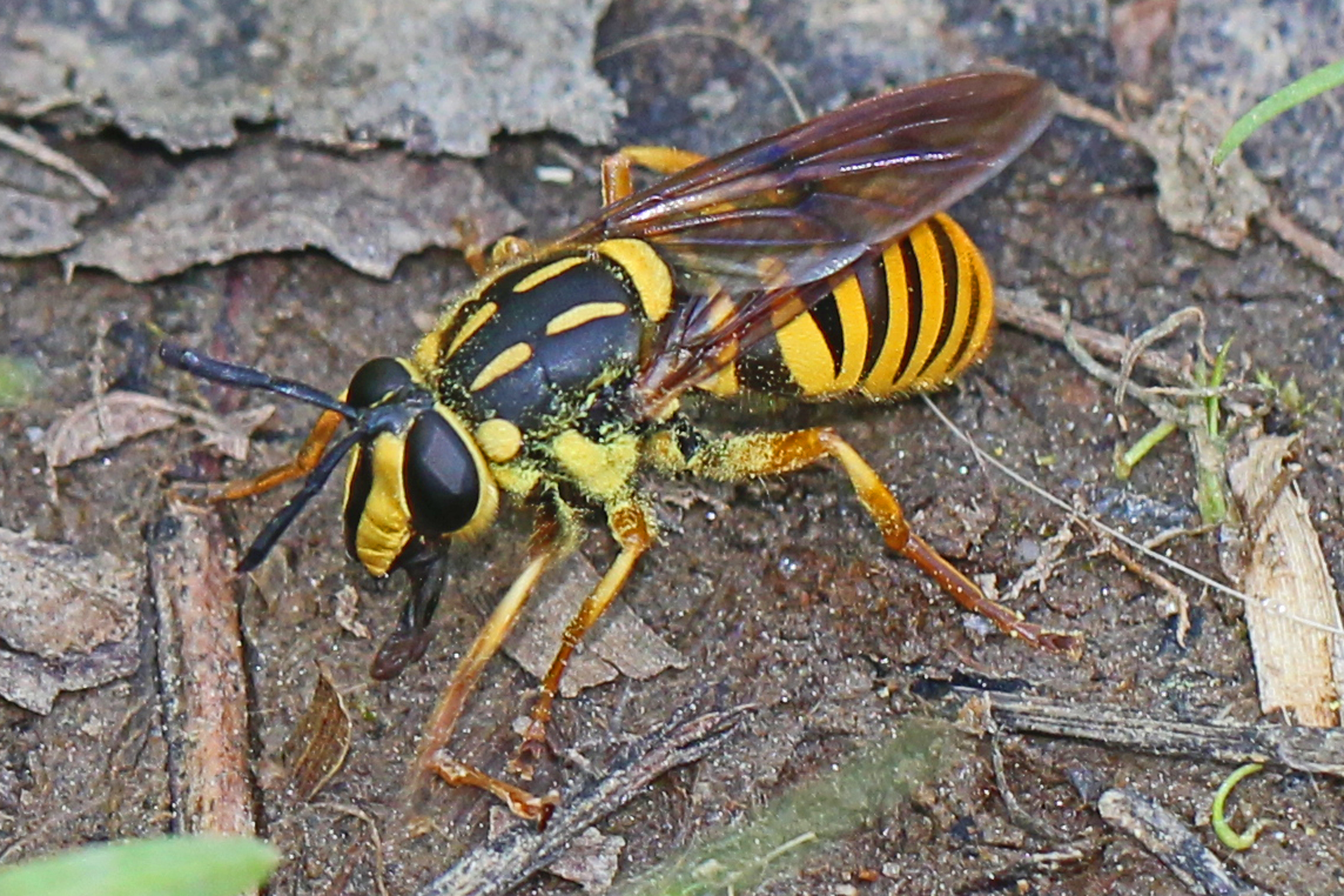
- Sphecomyia vittata

Scientific classification
- Kingdom: Animalia
- Phylum: Arthropoda
- Class: Insecta
- Order: Diptera
- Family: Syrphidae
- Subfamily: Eristalinae
- Tribe: Milesiini
- Subtribe: Criorhinina
- Genus: Sphecomyia; Latreille, 1829

Synonyms
- Sphecomye Latreille, 1825; Epopter Wiedemann, 1830; Tyzenhausia Gorski, 1852; Eurhinomallota Bigot, 1882; Eurhynomallota Bigot, 1883; Eurinomallota Kertész, 1910; Brachymyia Williston, 1882

= Sphecomyia =

Genus of flies

Sphecomyia is a genus of hoverfly in the family Syrphidae. There are about 16 described species in Sphecomyia.

== Species ==
- Sphecomyia aino (Stackelberg, 1955)
- Sphecomyia brevicornis Osten Sacken, 1877
- Sphecomyia columbiana Vockeroth, 1965
- Sphecomyia cryptica Moran, 2019
- Sphecomyia dyari Shannon, 1925
- Sphecomyia hoguei Moran, 2019
- Sphecomyia interrupta Moran, 2019
- Sphecomyia metallica (Bigot, 1882)
- Sphecomyia oraria Moran, 2019
- Sphecomyia pattonii Williston, 1882
- Sphecomyia pseudosphecomima Moran, 2019
- Sphecomyia sexfasciata Moran, 2019
- Sphecomyia tsherepanovi (Violovich, 1974)
- Sphecomyia vespiformis (Gorski, 1852)
- Sphecomyia vittata (Wiedemann, 1830)
- Sphecomyia weismani Moran, 2019
