= Deineches =

Scientific classification
- Kingdom: Animalia
- Phylum: Arthropoda
- Class: Insecta
- Order: Diptera
- Family: Syrphidae
- Subfamily: Eristalinae
- Tribe: Milesiini
- Subtribe: Criorhinina
- Genus: Deineches; Walker, 1852

Type species
- Deineches nigrofulva Walker, 1852

Genus of flies

Deineches is a genus of hoverflies from the family Syrphidae, in the order Diptera.

== Species ==
- Deineches fulva (Ferguson, 1926)
- Deineches hackeri (Ferguson, 1926)
- Deineches nudiventris (Macquart, 1846)
