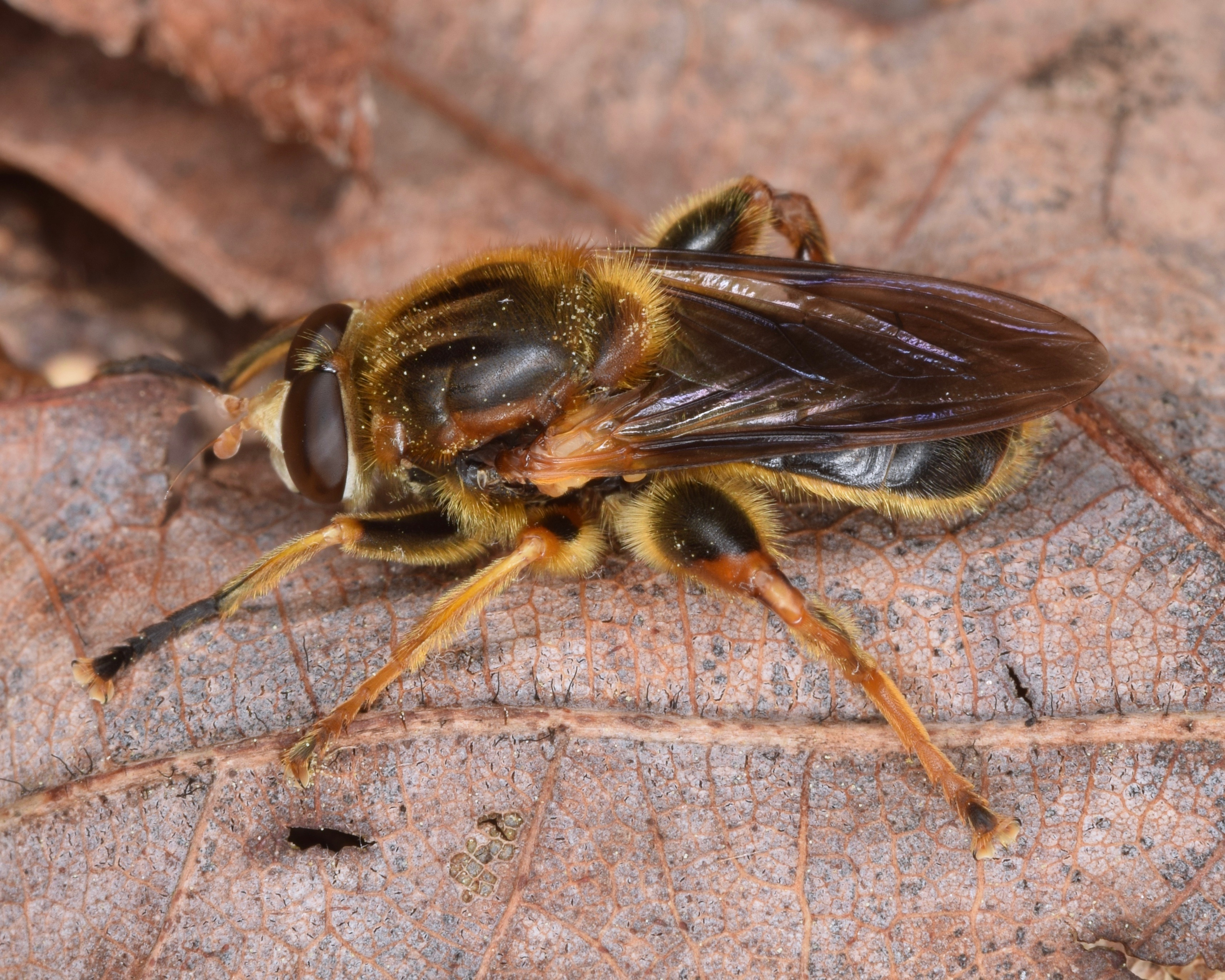
- Teuchocnemis lituratus

Scientific classification
- Kingdom: Animalia
- Phylum: Arthropoda
- Class: Insecta
- Order: Diptera
- Family: Syrphidae
- Subfamily: Eristalinae
- Tribe: Milesiini
- Subtribe: Temnostomina
- Genus: Teuchocnemis; Osten-Sacken, 1876

Type species
- Pterallastes lituratus Loew, 1863

= Teuchocnemis =

Genus of flies

Teuchocnemus is a genus of North American flower flies.

== Species ==
- Teuchocnemis bacuntius (Walker, 1849)
- Teuchocnemis lituratus (Loew, 1863)
