= Luigi Benoit =

Italian naturalist (1804–1890)

Luigi Benoit (8 February 1804, in Avola – 19 December 1890, in Messina) was an Italian naturalist.

Luigi Benoit studied at the military school "Nunziatella di Napoli" in Naples then began his career in the Agenzia delle Dogane in Messina where he married the Duchessa of Belviso. In 1828 he was arrested and condemned to 18 years of imprisonment in Palermo for supporting political reform. When Ferdinand II of the Two Sicilies changed the political direction he was released in 1832, and made "Amministratore del Gran Priorato Gerosomilitano di Messina".

Luigi Benoit was dedicated to the study of the ornithology and conchology of Sicily. In 1840 he published Ornitologia Siciliana (in English Sicilian Ornithology). He was also interested in marine biology. Luigi Benoit was a friend and correspondent of Antonio Schembri.

He is honoured in the fish name Hygophum benoiti (Cocco, 1838) and in the mollusc name Latiaxis benoiti Tiberi, 1855.
