= Malometasternum =

Scientific classification
- Kingdom: Animalia
- Phylum: Arthropoda
- Class: Insecta
- Order: Diptera
- Family: Syrphidae
- Subfamily: Eristalinae
- Tribe: Milesiini
- Subtribe: Criorhinina
- Genus: Malometasternum; Shannon, 1927

Type species
- Malometasternum scutellaris Shannon, 1927

Genus of flies

Malometasternum is a genus of hoverflies from the family Syrphidae, in the order Diptera.

== Species ==
- Malometasternum rufocaudata (Ferguson, 1926)
