= Lycastris =

Scientific classification
- Kingdom: Animalia
- Phylum: Arthropoda
- Class: Insecta
- Order: Diptera
- Family: Syrphidae
- Subfamily: Eristalinae
- Tribe: Milesiini
- Subtribe: Criorhinina
- Genus: Lycastris; Walker, 1857

Type species
- Lycastris albipes Walker, 1853

Synonyms
- Xiphopheromyia Bigot, 1892

Genus of flies

Lycastris is a genus of hoverfly in the family Syrphidae.

== Species ==
- Lycastris albipes Walker, 1857
- Lycastris austeni Brunetti, 1923
- Lycastris cornuta Enderlein, 1910
- Lycastris flavicrinis Cheng, 2012
- Lycastris flaviscutatus Huo & Ren, 2009
- Lycastris flavohirta Brunetti, 1907
- Lycastris griseipennis Coe, 1964
