= Takaomyia =

Scientific classification
- Kingdom: Animalia
- Phylum: Arthropoda
- Class: Insecta
- Order: Diptera
- Family: Syrphidae
- Subfamily: Eristalinae
- Tribe: Milesiini
- Subtribe: Temnostomina
- Genus: Takaomyia; Hervé-Bazin, 1914

Type species
- Takaomyia johannis Hervé-Bazin, 1914

Synonyms
- Vespiomyia Matsumura

Genus of flies

Takaomyia is a genus of hoverflies from the family Syrphidae, in the order Diptera.

== Species ==
- Takaomyia caligicrura Cheng, 2012
- Takaomyia flavofasciata Huo, 2017
- Takaomyia formosana Shiraki, 1930
- Takaomyia johannis Hervé-Bazin, 1914
- Takaomyia sexmaculata (Matsumura, 1916)
