= Macrometopia =

Scientific classification
- Kingdom: Animalia
- Phylum: Arthropoda
- Class: Insecta
- Order: Diptera
- Family: Syrphidae
- Subfamily: Eristalinae
- Tribe: Milesiini
- Subtribe: Xylotina
- Genus: Macrometopia; Philippi, 1865

Type species
- Macrometopia atra Philippi, 1865

Genus of flies

Macrometopia is a South American genus of hoverfly, restricted to the high Andes.

== Species ==
- M. atra Philippi, 1865
- M. montensis (Hull, 1938)
- M. maculipennis Thompson, 1999
