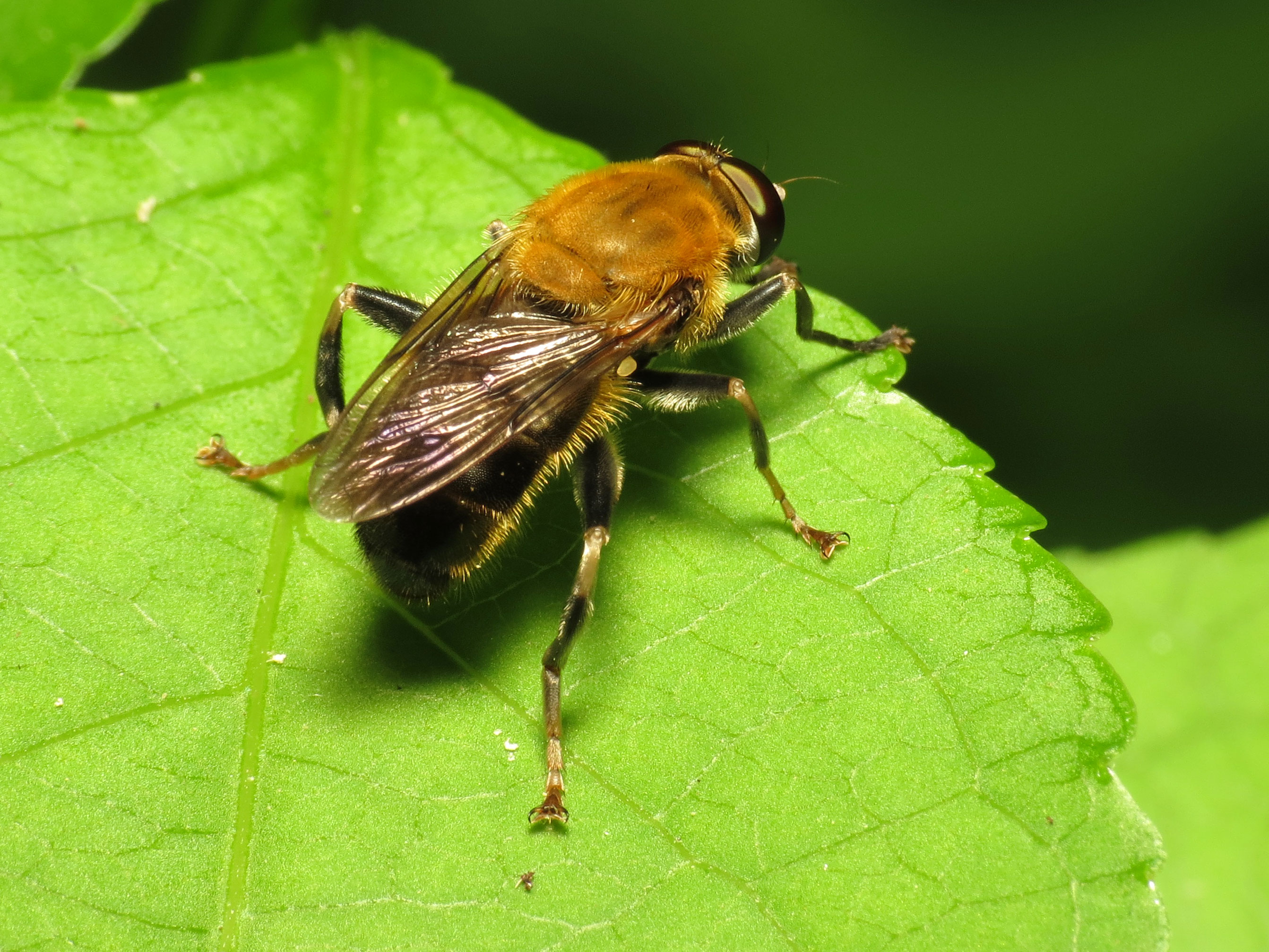
- Pterallastes thoracicus Male

Scientific classification
- Kingdom: Animalia
- Phylum: Arthropoda
- Class: Insecta
- Order: Diptera
- Family: Syrphidae
- Subfamily: Eristalinae
- Tribe: Milesiini
- Subtribe: Temnostomina
- Genus: Pterallastes; Loew, 1863

Type species
- Pterallastes thoracicus Loew, 1863

Synonyms
- Pseudozetterstedtia Shiraki, 1930; Pteralastes Loew, 1864; Pterelastes Schiner, 1868; Pterellastes Scudder, 1882

= Pterallastes =

Genus of flies

Pterallastes is a genus of bee-mimicking hoverflies. So far the genus contains only four species, one in North America, one from Japan, and two from China.

== Species ==
- Pterallastes bettyae Thompson, 1979
- Pterallastes bomboides Thompson, 1974
- Pterallastes thoracicus Loew, 1863
- Pterallastes unicolor (Shiraki, 1930)
