= Antonio Schembri (ornithologist) =

Maltese ornithologist (1813-1872)

Antonio Schembri (April 1813, in Valletta – December 1872) was a Maltese ornithologist.

Antonio Schembri was a shipping agent. He wrote, in Italian, Catalogo Ornitologico del Gruppo di Malta (1843) which is the first scientific checklist of the birds of Malta and also Quadro Geografico Ornitologico Ossia Quadro Comparativo dell’Ornitologia di Malta, Sicilia, Roma, Toscana, Liguria, Nizza ela Provincia di Gard (also 1843). In Quadro Geografico he compared the range and breeding habitats of the birds of Malta, Sicily, Rome, Tuscany, etc. in a tabular list. He also published, in Bologna, Vocabolario dei Sinonimi Classici dell' Ornitologia Europea (1846). He was a friend and correspondent of Luigi Benoit and a contributor (he was also an entomologist) to Camillo Rondani's Dipterologiae Italicae prodromus.
