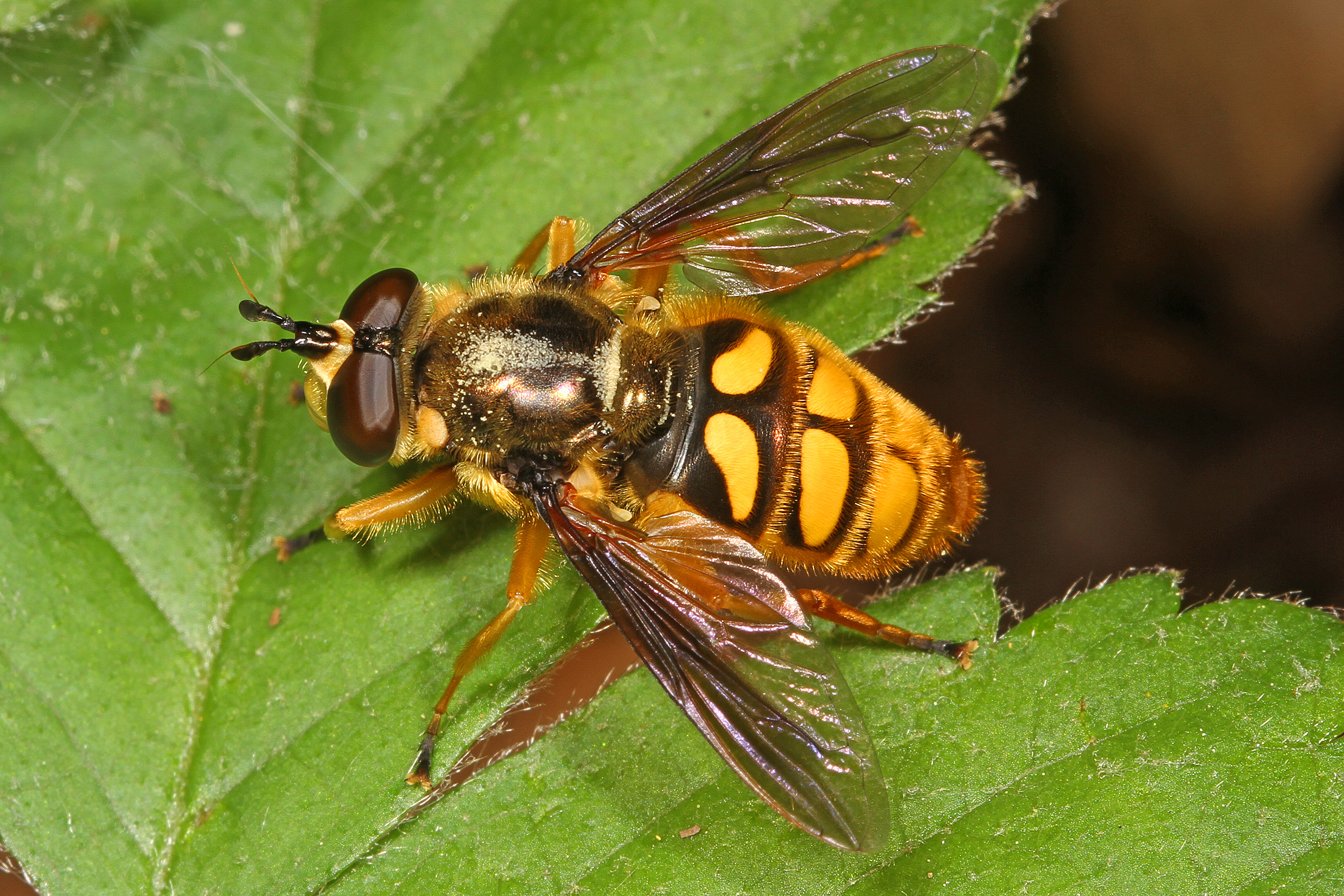
- Somula decora

Scientific classification
- Kingdom: Animalia
- Phylum: Arthropoda
- Class: Insecta
- Order: Diptera
- Family: Syrphidae
- Subfamily: Eristalinae
- Tribe: Milesiini
- Subtribe: Blerina
- Genus: Somula; Macquart, 1847

Type species
- Somula decora Macquart, 1847

= Somula =

Genus of flies

Somula is a genus of syrphid flies in the family Syrphidae. There are at least two described species in Somula.

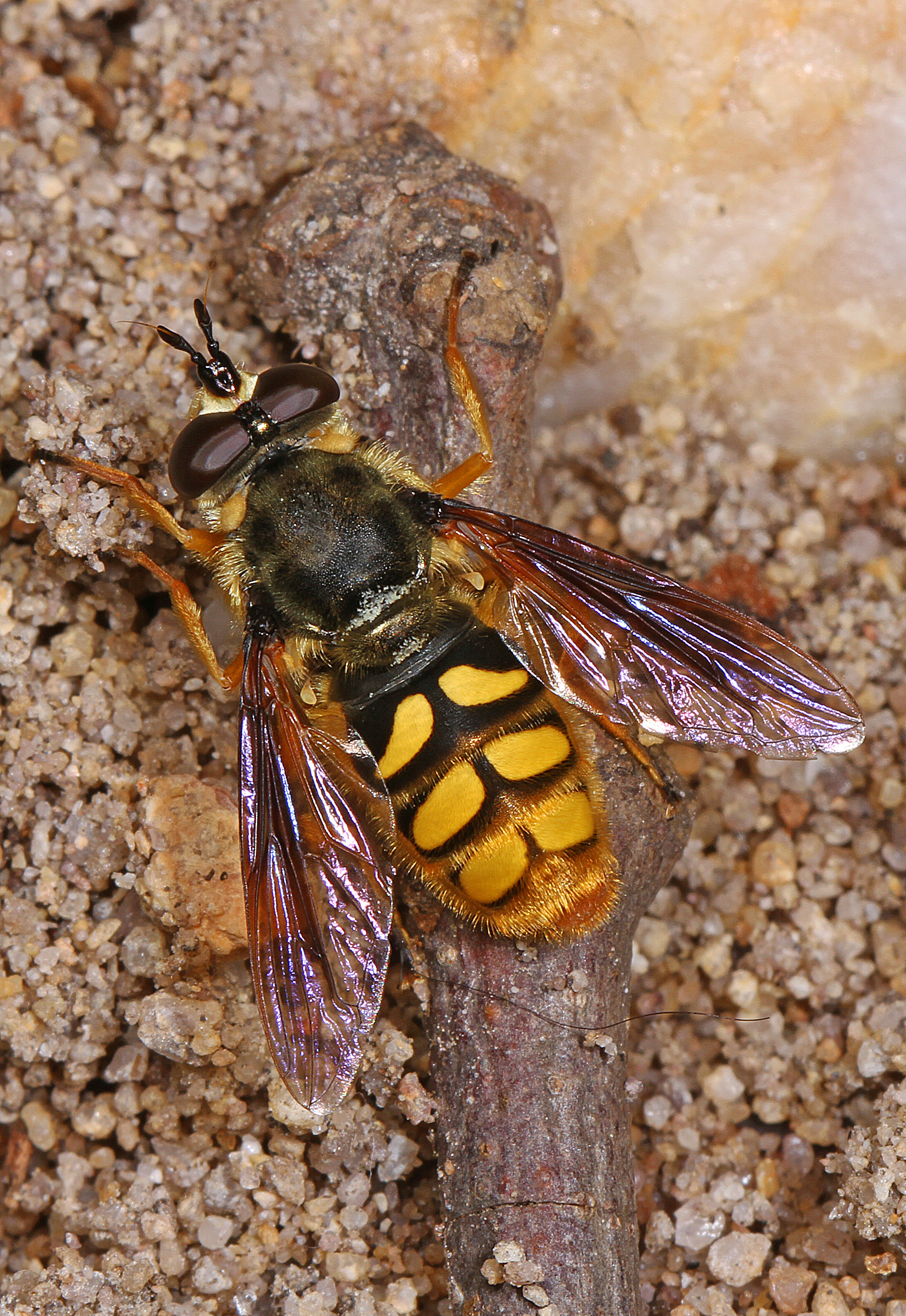
Somula decora

== Species ==
- Somula decora Macquart, 1847
- Somula mississippiensis Hull, 1922
