= Philippimyia =

Scientific classification
- Kingdom: Animalia
- Phylum: Arthropoda
- Class: Insecta
- Order: Diptera
- Family: Syrphidae
- Subfamily: Eristalinae
- Tribe: Milesiini
- Subtribe: Blerina
- Genus: Philippimyia; Shannon, 1926

Type species
- Sterphus cyanocephala Philippi, 1865

Genus of flies

Philippimyia is a genus of hoverfly in the family Syrphidae.

== Species ==
- Philippimyia cyanocephala (Philippi, 1865)
