= Flukea =

Scientific classification
- Kingdom: Animalia
- Phylum: Arthropoda
- Class: Insecta
- Order: Diptera
- Family: Syrphidae
- Subfamily: Eristalinae
- Tribe: Milesiini
- Subtribe: Criorhinina
- Genus: Flukea; Etcheverry, 1966

Type species
- Flukea vockerothi Etcheverry, 1966

Synonyms
- Fluckea Etcheverry, 1966

Genus of flies

Flukea is a genus of hoverflies from the family Syrphidae, in the order Diptera.

== Species ==
- Flukea vockerothi Etcheverry, 1966
