= Dipterologiae Italicae prodromus =

Work on insect taxonomy

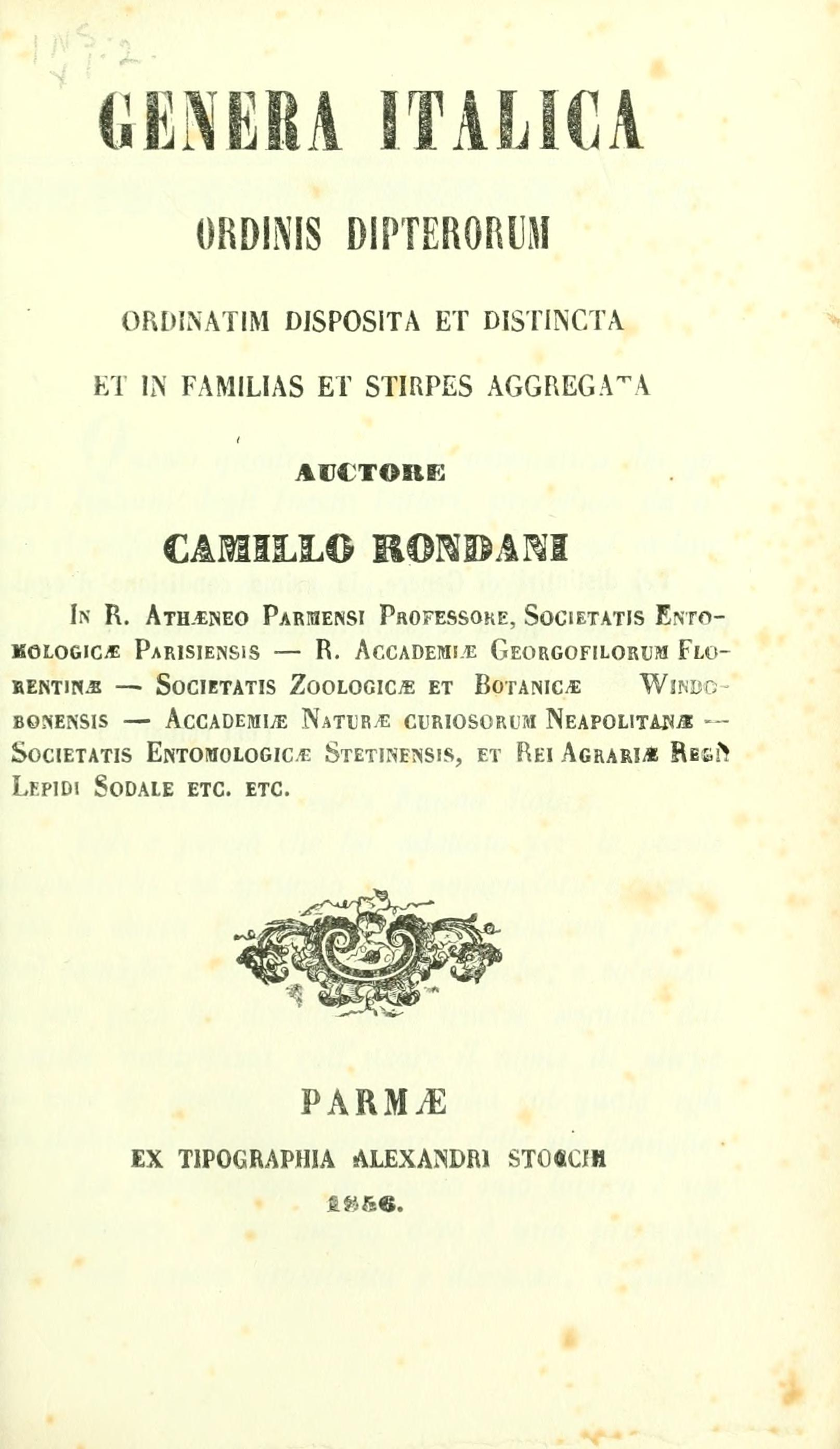
Volume 1 Title page

Dipterologiae Italicae prodromus is a fundamental work of systematic entomology by the Italian entomologist Camillo Rondani. It consists of seven volumes published in Paris, Parma, Firenze (Ex Tipographia A. Stocchii between 1856 and 1877. It is written in Latin. The subject is the Diptera of Italy.

A prodromus is a preliminary publication intended as a basis for future work – Rondani's expression is "un programma, o, per meglio dire, una proposta che vuol essere esaminata e discussa e quindi riformata, dietro le considerazioni dei dotti in tale materia", in English a programme, or, better to say, a proposal to be examined and discussed and therefore changed, after the considerations of scholars in such materia.

Nineteen publications and twenty memoires, fragments and commentaries by Rondani complement the prodromo. These are not part of the work but integrate sections, add further information, modify, complement and illuminate the prodromo text.

== Volume 1 ==
Volume I is an overview presented as a dichotomous key of classification of the thirty-two families and eighty-four stirpi (subfamilies) of European Diptera. It is titled Genera italica ordinis depterorum ordinatim disposita et distincta et in familias et stirpes aggregata and also keys to genera very many of them new.

Carl Robert Osten-Sacken said of Volume 1 quoting Hermann Loew "The first volume of the "Prodromus" contains dichotomic tables of the families and genera of Italian Diptera, published in advance of the intended work upon them. The number of genera (according to Loew's statement, loc. cit., p. 338) is 587; among them a considerable number are new ones, the names of which are introduced without any other description but that contained in the data of the dichotomic tables, connected with the name of the typical, often as yet undescribed, species. Loew was right in calling this premature publication a failure calculated to impede, rather than to advance, the future progress of dipterology. Loew enumerates a large number of errors, misspelling of names and misprints". This, however, is the technical view and whilst it is true that the Prodromus causes some nomenclatural problems the review overlooks the fact (recognised by both Osten-Sacken and Loew) that the work is a prodromus, a regional fauna and an identification manual as well as a systematic treatise in a universal language (Latin). The problem of nomina nuda was resolved as the succeeding volumes were published and the errors, misspelling of names and misprints identified by Loew were largely corrected in later errata and the Prodromus as a whole is one of the most cited works on European Diptera.

== Volumes 2-7 ==
The subsequent six volumes also present dichotomous keys so that the entire work functions as a handbook for identification as well as a regional fauna. They are titled Species italica ordinis dipterorum in genera characteribus definita, ordination collectae methodo analitica distinctae, ex novis vel minus cognotis descriptis. These six volumes contain the species descriptions. The parts are:

- Pars I (Prima) 1857 Oestridae Syrphidae, Conopidae
- Pars II (Secunda) 1859 Muscidae, Siphoninae et (partim) Tachinae
- Pars IV 1862 (Quarta) Muscidae, Phasiinae, Dexinae, Muscinae, Stomoxydinae
- Pars IV 1861 (Tertia) Muscidae Tachinarium complentum
- Pars V 1877 (Quinta) Stirps XVII Anthomyinae
- Pars VI See Part VII
- Pars VII (Sexta sic) 1866-1871 Scatophaginae, Sciomyzinae and Ortalidinae
- Pars VII Fasc I Scathophaginae Italicae collecte distincte et in ordinem depositae
- Pars VII Fasc II Sciomyzinae Italicae collecte distincte et in ordinem depositae
- Pars VII Fasc IV Linea B Tephritoidea
- Pars VII Ortalidinae Italicae collecte distincte et in ordinem depositae extracted from Bollettino della Societa Entomologica Italiana Vol.1 Fasc 1 and 2 1870

== Collaborators Volumes 2-7 ==
The following entomologists appear in the text

- Maximilian Spinola
- Luigi Bellardi
- Oronzo Gabriele Costa
- Achille Costa Southern Italy
- Giuseppe Mussino Genoa collections from Piemontese and Liguria
- Giuseppe Gené
- Gaetano Giorgio Gemellaro, Professore di Geologia nella B. Uniyersiti di Palermo
- Giovanni Battista Villa, 1810-1887 Milano
- Eugenio Truqui Torino
- M. Pecchioli Pisa
- Conte Luigi D'Arco Mantova
- Antonio Schembri (ornithologist) Islands
- Alexander Henry Haliday

== Geographic Scope ==
The work is an intellectual aspiration of the Risorgimento and includes records from the whole of modern Italy (post 1861) including Sicily and Sardinia excepting Rome which was not part of the Italian State until 1864.

== Similar Works ==
Other regional faunas (countries as opposed to smaller regions) of this broad date whose subject is Diptera are Johan Wilhelm Zetterstedt, 1855 Diptera Scandinaviae disposita et descripta. Tomus duodecimus seu supplementum tertium, continens addenda, corrigenda & emendanda tomis undecim prioribus. Officina Lundbergiana, Lundae (Lund), Francis Walker Insecta Britannica Diptera, 1851–1856 and Ignaz Rudolph Schiner Fauna Austriaca. Die Fliegen (Diptera). Nach der analytischen Methode bearbeitet 1862-1864.

== Rarity ==
The original work is extremely rare as few copies were printed and it was partly published in periodicals. Dipterologiae Italicae prodromus was published as facsimile reprint in 1914 by Wilhelm Junk Berlin but this is also rare.
