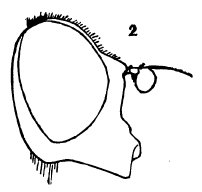
- Cynorhinella bella from Williston as Myiolepta bella

Scientific classification
- Kingdom: Animalia
- Phylum: Arthropoda
- Class: Insecta
- Order: Diptera
- Superfamily: Syrphoidea
- Family: Syrphidae
- Subfamily: Eristalinae
- Tribe: Milesiini
- Genus: Cynorhinella; Curran, 1922

Type species
- Cynorhinella canadensis Curran, 1922

Synonyms
- Apicomyia Shannon, 1922

= Cynorhinella =

Genus of flies

Cynorhinella is a genus of hoverflies from the family Syrphidae, in the order Diptera. Curran erected Cynorhinella for a new species which he named canadensis. He states in the description: "I am unable to place the following specimen in any genus known to me, and it traces out to Cynorhina in Williston's manual, and apparently comes closest to this genus but the thickened, arcuate hind femora with the projection apically, and the more distinct facial side margins separate it. It is related to Chilosia and Chrysochlamys by the last mentioned character, but there is no semblance of bristles and the shape of the abdomen is distinctive."

== Species ==
- C. bella (Williston, 1882)
- C. longinasus Shannon, 1924
