= Camillo Rondani =

Italian entomologist

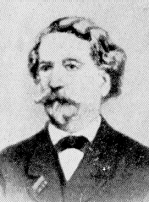
- Portrait of Camillo Rondani
- Born: November 21, 1808; Parma, Italy
- Died: September 17, 1879 (aged 70)
- Occupations: Educator, scientist, businessman

Camillo Rondani (21 November 1808 – 17 September 1879) was an Italian entomologist noted for his studies of Diptera.

== Early life, family and education ==
Camillo Rondani was born in Parma when the city was part of the French Empire Napoleon having crowned himself King of Italy. The Rondani family were wealthy landowners and of "rich and of ancient origins" with ecclesiastical connections preliminary.

Camillo's early education was in a seminary. He then passed into the public school system where, encouraged by Macedonio Melloni his physics and chemistry teacher in the preparatory course for the University of Parma, he did not attend the law lessons though his family had insisted. He attended mineralogy classes given by a Franciscan priest Father Bagatta and was taught natural history, a complementary course to botany for Medicine and Pharmacy. The Reader of Botany to the Athenaeum Parmesan was Professori Giorgio Jan, assistant at the Imperial Museum in Vienna and holder of the chair of zoology in Parma University. From Jan, Rondani received many gifts to his collection: Coleoptera and a herbarium. Through Jan, Rondani gained access to the house of the Conte Stefano Sanvitale, where an entomological club had access to the insect collection of Pietro Rossi.

== Career in law, politics and commerce ==
Rondani qualified as a lawyer in 1831. A plan to study zoology at the University of Paris, a condition of his proposed appointment as Professor of Natural Science in Parma, came to nothing as Italy was thrown into political turmoil, the university urging its students to die for the unity of Italy, a resurgent demand of Giuseppe Garibaldi. Following the Ducal restoration after three years of provisional government, not only was the chair of Zoology a distant dream, but the legal faculty had been removed to Piacenza in order to diminish the number of politically active students.

Camillo and his brother Emilio, who had been imprisoned by the temporary government, turned to colonial commerce. Rondani studied the insects of the exotic products describing two of the beetles he found Cis jalapa from chillies and Brucus dolici from Santa Domingo coffee.

== Marriage and farming ==
In 1833 Rondani married his first love, Petronilla, for whom he later named a new species of Ceria now Sphiximorpha petronillae. The couple ran a family farm on the pleasant hillsides of Guardasone. This was transformed with dams and scientific soil management systems which he used for studying agronomy and, with Petronilla, poetry and the arts. It was at this time that his studies of Diptera began, possibly because of their agricultural significance.

A few years later, Petronilla died.

== Entomology studies ==
After his wife died, Rondani focused intensely on entomology, working especially on the biology of parasitic insects (Diptera and Hymenoptera).

Although little of his entomological work was published by Rondani himself, it raised him to preeminence. In 1840, he became a member of the Academy of France, published his first paper, and corresponded with Félix Édouard Guérin-Méneville on insects of Sicilian amber. Further publications rapidly followed on species new to Italy, new to science, plans of classifications, taxonomic arguments, and initial work on his masterwork, the Prodomo, a treatise on Diptera. Many were (confusingly) printed locally at the printing office in Parma, but then, following amendments in the entomological journals Nuovi Annali di Scienze Naturali di Bologna, Magazin de Zoologie de M. J. Guérin Ménéville, and the Annales de la Société Entomologique de France.

In the nationalistic wars of 1848 the Rondani's were recalled to Parma. Camillo was briefly elected to represent Traversetolo. Following the catastrophic defeat of the Piedmontese at the Battle of Novara, Rondani retired back to Guardasone, and for some years, as Italians became increasingly involved in colonial ambition, worked on exotic Diptera. In these years he began to collaborate with the Irish entomologist Alexander Henry Haliday with whom he was to co-found the Italian Entomological Society.

== Later career ==
In 1855, when Luisa Maria of Borbone, sister of Maria Christina of Bourbon-Two Sicilies reopened the university of Parma, which had virtually closed its doors in 1849, Rondani became Professor of Agronomy. The Prodromo began in earnest, as Rondani alternated teaching with research much of it in applied entomology. Ten years Parma became part of the United Provinces of Central Italy, joining Tuscany, Modena and Piacenza). This led to changes in the university. The chair of agronomy was abolished and Rondani became emerito University professor of the University and insignito of the cross of the Saints Maurizio and Lazzaro. He became a natural history teacher in the R.? Grammar school and also Director of the Agrarian Institute where he taught agronomy. Rondani remained in both posts for the next ten years though the Institute passed to the Provincial Administration in 1865.

Rondani became a popular writer for several newspapers and had various assignments from government and from the Camera d'Agricoltura e Commercio [Agriculture and Commerce Chamber] and the Giunta Superiore di Statistica [Advanced Committee of Statistics] for which he was awarded a medal. He maintained his interest in politics to the last, being an influential member of the Consigli della Provincia e del Comune, unhesitatingly supporting liberal and progressive ideals.

== Second marriage and demise ==
He married a second time, to his cousin Elisa Gelati.

Rondani died on September 17, 1879. His collection is in La Specola Museum, Florence, Italy.

== Insects named in honour of Rondani ==
- Rondania Robineau-Desvoidy, 1850 — a tachinid fly genus Tachinidae
- Chrysogaster rondanii Maibach & Goeldlin, 1995 — a hoverfly Syrphidae
- Fannia rondanii (Strobl, 1893) — a lesser house fly Fanniidae
- Tabanus rondanii Bellardi, 1859 — a horsefly Tabanidae from Mexico
- Philoliche rondani Bertoloni, 1861 — a horsefly Tabanidae from South Africa
- Pteromalus rondanii Dalla Torre, 1898 — a parasitic wasp Pteromalidae
- Rhopalocerus rondanii Villa, 1833 — a beetle Colydiinae
- Tetralobus rondanii Bertoloni, 1849 — a click-beetle Elateridae

== Works ==
- Dipterologiae Italicae prodromus (1856–1877, six volumes)

Other works see: Sabrosky's Family Group Names in Diptera

== Sources ==
- Pape, T. 2002. Name bearing types of Sarcophagidae (Diptera) in Museo Civico di Storia Naturale "Giacomo Doria", Genova, described by C. Rondani, E. Corti and E. Séguy. - Studia dipterologica 9: 343–348.
