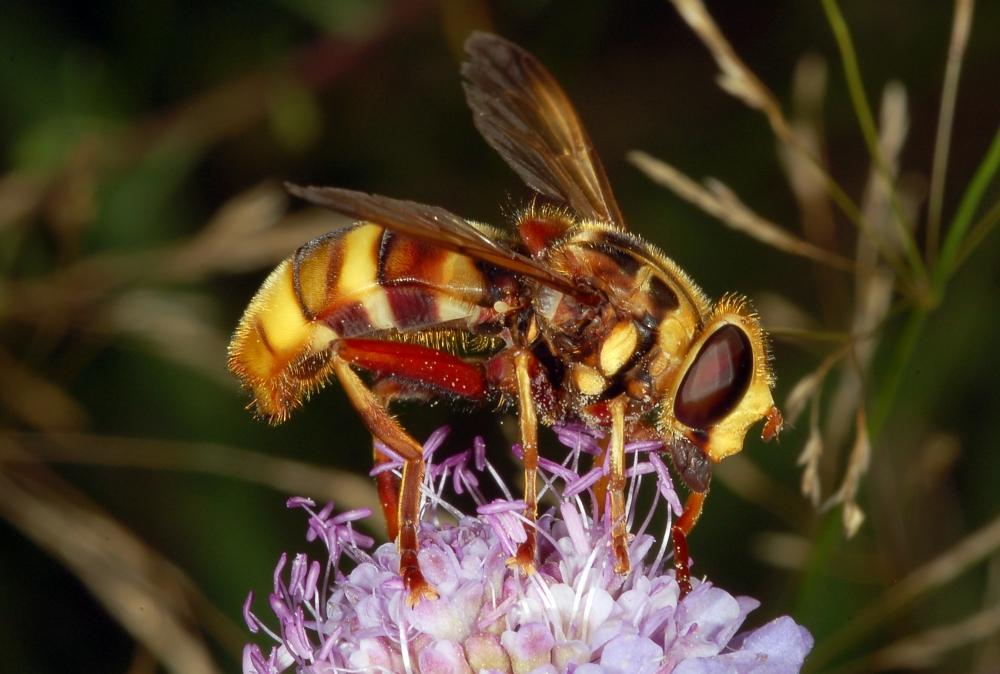
- Milesia crabroniformis

Scientific classification
- Kingdom: Animalia
- Phylum: Arthropoda
- Clade: Pancrustacea
- Class: Insecta
- Order: Diptera
- Family: Syrphidae
- Subfamily: Eristalinae
- Tribe: Milesiini; Rondani, 1845

Genera
- See text

= Milesiini =

Tribe of flies

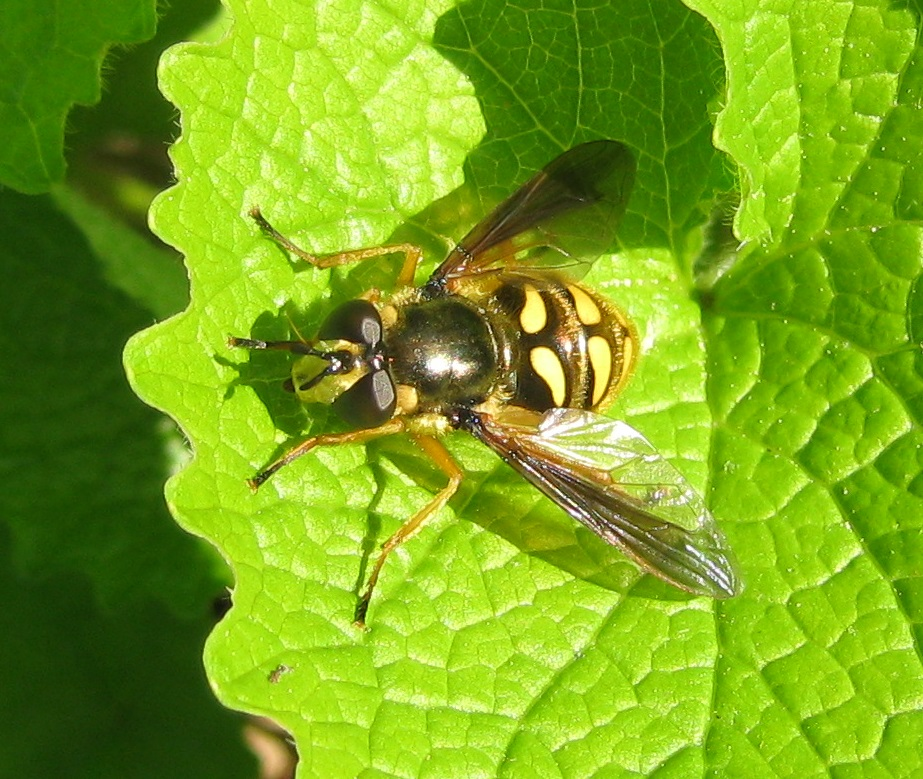
Somula decora

The Milesiini (or Xylotini) is a large and diverse tribe of hoverflies. They mimic wasps or hornets.

== List of genera ==
- Aneriophora Stuardo & Cortes, 1952
- Blera Billberg, 1820
- Brachypalpus Macquart, 1834
- Caliprobola Rondani, 1845
- Chalcosyrphus Curran, 1925
- Criorhina Meigen, 1822
- Cynorhinella Curran, 1922
- Deineches Walker, 1852
- Flukea Etcheverry, 1966
- Hadromyia Williston, 1882
- Hemixylota Shannon & Aubertin, 1933
- Lejota Rondani, 1857
- Lycastris Walker, 1857
- Macrometopia Philippi, 1865
- Macrozelima Stackelberg, 1930
- Malometasternum Shannon, 1927
- Matsumyia Shiraki, 1949
- Meropidia Hippa & Thompson, 1983
- Milesia Latreille, 1804
- Nepenthosyrphus de Meijere, 1932
- Odyneromyia Shannon & Aubertin, 1833
- Orthoprosopa Macquart, 1850
- Palumbia Rondani, 1865
- Philippimyia Shannon, 1926
- Pocota Lepeletier & Serville, 1828
- Pterallastes Loew, 1863
- Senogaster Macquart, 1834
- Somula Macquart, 1847
- Sphecomyia Latreille, 1829
- Spilomyia Meigen, 1803
- Sterphus Philippi, 1865
- Stilbosoma Philippi, 1865
- Syritta Lepeletier & Serville, 1828
- Syrittosyrphus Hull, 1944
- Takaomyia Herve-Bazin, 1914
- Temnostoma Lepeletier & Serville, 1828
- Teuchocnemis Osten Sacken, 1875
- Tropidia Meigen, 1822
- Valdiviomyia Vockeroth, 1976
- Xylota Meigen, 1822
