= Calcaretropidia =

Scientific classification
- Kingdom: Animalia
- Phylum: Arthropoda
- Clade: Pancrustacea
- Class: Insecta
- Order: Diptera
- Family: Syrphidae
- Subtribe: Tropidiina
- Genus: Calcaretropidia; Keiser, 1971

Type species
- Calcaretropidia madagascariensis

Species
- Calcaretropidia androyensis; Calcaretropidia delmohardy; Calcaretropidia madagascariensis; Calcaretropidia pandani

Genus of hoverfly

Calcaretropidia is a genus of hoverfly (family Syrphidae) in the subtribe Tropidiina.

== Classification ==
Calcaretropidia is one of eleven genera in the subtribe Tropidiina, the other ten being: Tropidia, Orthoprosopa, Paratropidia, Macrozelima, Meropidia, Nepenthosyrphus, Rhinotropidia, Senogaster, Syritta, and Brachypalpoides.

== Characteristics ==
Key characteristics of the genus Calcaretropidia include a swollen hind femur, a carinate face, and large ommatidia.

== Distribution ==
Until 2017, Calcaretropidia was thought to be endemic to the island of Madagascar. The discovery of Calcaretropidia delmohardy on the islands of Sulawesi and New Guinea disproved this, confirming Calcaretropidia's presence on both sides of the Lydekker line and challenging earlier assumptions of endemism to Madagascar.

== Ecology and behaviour ==
=== Seasonality ===
Unlike many temperate species in the subtribe Tropidiina that exhibit summer seasonality, Calcaretropidia species occur in tropical regions such as Madagascar, New Guinea, and Sulawesi, where activity is likely governed by local climatic conditions (such as humidity) rather than temperature seasonality. Currently, no general flight season has been established.

=== Feeding ===
While little is known about Calcaretropidia's specific feeding behaviour, they are thought to pollinate flowers as adults.
