= Meropidia rufa =

Scientific classification
- Kingdom: Animalia
- Phylum: Arthropoda
- Clade: Pancrustacea
- Class: Insecta
- Order: Diptera
- Family: Syrphidae
- Subfamily: Eristalinae
- Tribe: Milesiini
- Subtribe: Tropidiina
- Genus: Meropidia
- Species: M. rufa

Binomial name
- Meropidia rufa Thompson, 1983

Species of fly

Meropidia rufa is a species of hoverfly in the family Syrphidae. Adult females measure about 13 mm (0.51 in). Males are unknown.

== Distribution ==
Meropidia rufa is known from Ecuador. The holotype was collected from Limón in eastern Ecuador at 900 m (3,000 ft) above sea level.
