= Meropidia nigropilosa =

Scientific classification
- Kingdom: Animalia
- Phylum: Arthropoda
- Clade: Pancrustacea
- Class: Insecta
- Order: Diptera
- Family: Syrphidae
- Subfamily: Eristalinae
- Tribe: Milesiini
- Subtribe: Tropidiina
- Genus: Meropidia
- Species: M. nigropilosa

Binomial name
- Meropidia nigropilosa Thompson, 1983

Species of fly

Meropidia nigropilosa is a species of hoverfly in the family Syrphidae. Adult females measure about 12 mm (0.47 in). Males are unknown.

== Distribution ==
Meropidia nigropilosa is known from Colombia. The holotype was collected from Monte Socorro in the Cordillera Occidental at 3,800 m (12,500 ft) above sea level.
