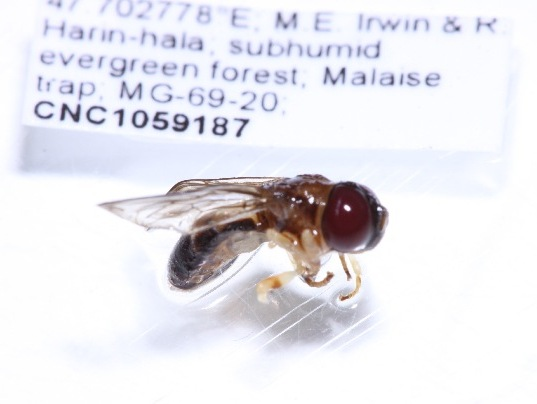

Scientific classification
- Kingdom: Animalia
- Phylum: Arthropoda
- Clade: Pancrustacea
- Class: Insecta
- Order: Diptera
- Family: Syrphidae
- Subfamily: Microdontinae
- Genus: Afromicrodon; Thompson, 2008

Type species
- Microdon johannae van Doesburg, 1957

= Afromicrodon =

Genus of flies

Afromicrodon is an African genus of hoverflies. The species of the genus Afromicrodon were previously and erroneously placed in the genus Ceratophya.

Afromicrodon species are recognized among the Microdontinae by them lacking an appendix on vein R4+5, having short antennae about as long as the face or shorter, and a simple basoflagellomere and simple scutellum without calcar. The abdomen is oval.

== Distribution ==
All currently known species are restricted to Madagascar and the Comoros Islands.

== Species ==
- Afromicrodon comoroensis (De Meyer, De Bruyn & Janssons, 1990) originally placed in genus Ceratophya
- Afromicrodon johannae (van Doesburg, 1957) originally placed in genus Microdon
- Afromicrodon luciferus (Hull, 1941) originally placed in genus Microdon
- Afromicrodon madecassa (Keiser, 1971) originally placed in genus Ceratophya
- Afromicrodon stuckenbergi (Keiser, 1971) originally placed in genus Ceratophya
