= Nepenthosyrphus venustus =

Scientific classification
- Kingdom: Animalia
- Phylum: Arthropoda
- Class: Insecta
- Order: Diptera
- Family: Syrphidae
- Subfamily: Eristalinae
- Tribe: Milesiini
- Subtribe: Tropidiina
- Genus: Nepenthosyrphus
- Species: N. venustus

Binomial name
- Nepenthosyrphus venustus Thompson, 1971

Species of fly

Nepenthosyrphus venustus is a species of hoverfly in the family Syrphidae.

== Distribution ==
Philippines.
