= Orthoprosopa margarita =

Scientific classification
- Kingdom: Animalia
- Phylum: Arthropoda
- Class: Insecta
- Order: Diptera
- Family: Syrphidae
- Subfamily: Eristalinae
- Tribe: Milesiini
- Subtribe: Tropidiina
- Genus: Orthoprosopa
- Subgenus: Paratropidia
- Species: O. margarita

Binomial name
- Orthoprosopa margarita (Thompson, 1972)

Synonyms
- Paratropidia margarita Thompson, 1972

Species of fly

Orthoprosopa margarita is a species of hoverfly in the family Syrphidae.

== Distribution ==
It is found in New Guinea.
