= Sterphus =

Scientific classification
- Kingdom: Animalia
- Phylum: Arthropoda
- Class: Insecta
- Order: Diptera
- Family: Syrphidae
- Subfamily: Eristalinae
- Tribe: Milesiini
- Subtribe: Xylotina
- Genus: Sterphus; Philippi, 1865

Type species
- Sterphus autumnalis Philippi, 1865

Synonyms
- Ceriogaster Williston, 1888; Zonemyia Shannon, 1925; Tatuomyia Shannon, 1926; Crepidomyia Shannon, 1926; Senoceria Hull, 1930; Willistonimyia Hull, 1943; Mutillimyia Hull, 1943; Stherphus Fluke, 1957; Telus Thompson, 1973

Genus of flies

Sterphus is a genus of hoverflies.

== Species ==
- Sterphus andicus Hippa, 1978
- Sterphus arethusa (Hull, 1944)
- Sterphus aureopila (Hull, 1941)
- Sterphus aureus Hippa, 1978
- Sterphus auricaudatus (Williston, 1892)
- Sterphus aurifrons Shannon, 1926
- Sterphus batesi (Shannon, 1926)
- Sterphus calypso Hippa, 1994
- Sterphus chiragra (Fabricius, 1805)
- Sterphus chloropyga (Schiner, 1868)
- Sterphus coarctatus (Wiedemann, 1830)
- Sterphus coeruleus (Rondani, 1863)
- Sterphus cybele (Hull, 1951)
- Sterphus cydippe Hippa, 1994
- Sterphus fascithorax (Williston, 1888)
- Sterphus fassli Hippa, 1978
- Sterphus fulvus Thompson, 1973
- Sterphus funebris (Hull, 1944)
- Sterphus gamezi Thompson, 1997
- Sterphus hinei (Thompson, 1976)
- Sterphus incarum Hippa, 1978
- Sterphus incertus Thompson, 1973
- Sterphus intermedius Thompson, 1973
- Sterphus janzeni Thompson, 1994
- Sterphus latitarsatus (Macquart, 1842)
- Sterphus nigrita (Fabricius, 1781)
- Sterphus nitidicollis Hippa, 1978
- Sterphus ochripes Hippa, 1978
- Sterphus panamensis (Curran, 1930)
- Sterphus pilifer Hippa, 1978
- Sterphus plagiatus (Wiedemann, 1830)
- Sterphus rudis (Hull, 1944)
- Sterphus rufoabdominalis Zumbado, 1997
- Sterphus sapphirifer Hippa, 1978
- Sterphus scutellata (Curran, 1934)
- Sterphus shannoni Thompson, 1973
- Sterphus spinosus (Shannon, 1925)
- Sterphus stimulans Thompson, 1973
- Sterphus telus Thompson, 1973
- Sterphus tinctus (Fluke, 1951)
- Sterphus transversus (Walker, 1857)
- Sterphus venezuelaensis Thompson, 1994
- Sterphus woodorum Thompson, 1973
