= Sterphus hinei =

Scientific classification
- Kingdom: Animalia
- Phylum: Arthropoda
- Clade: Pancrustacea
- Class: Insecta
- Order: Diptera
- Family: Syrphidae
- Subfamily: Eristalinae
- Tribe: Milesiini
- Subtribe: Xylotina
- Genus: Sterphus
- Species: S. hinei

Binomial name
- Sterphus hinei (Thompson, 1976)

Synonyms
- Myolepta transversa Hine, 1913; Ceriogaster hinei Thompson, 1976

Species of fly

Sterphus hinei is a species of Hoverfly in the family Syrphidae.

== Distribution ==
Honduras.
