= Macrozelima scripta =

Scientific classification
- Kingdom: Animalia
- Phylum: Arthropoda
- Class: Insecta
- Order: Diptera
- Family: Syrphidae
- Subfamily: Eristalinae
- Tribe: Milesiini
- Subtribe: Tropidiina
- Genus: Macrozelima
- Species: M. scripta

Binomial name
- Macrozelima scripta Hippa, 1978

Species of fly

Macrozelima scripta is a species of hoverfly in the family Syrphidae.

== Distribution ==
Myanmar.
