= Meropidia neurostigma =

Scientific classification
- Kingdom: Animalia
- Phylum: Arthropoda
- Clade: Pancrustacea
- Class: Insecta
- Order: Diptera
- Family: Syrphidae
- Subfamily: Eristalinae
- Tribe: Milesiini
- Subtribe: Tropidiina
- Genus: Meropidia
- Species: M. neurostigma

Binomial name
- Meropidia neurostigma Hippa, 1983

Species of fly

Meropidia neurostigma is a species of hoverfly in the family Syrphidae. Its length is about 14 mm (0.55 in).

== Distribution ==
Meropidia neurostigma is known from Bolivia and Colombia.
