= Senogaster dentipes =

Scientific classification
- Kingdom: Animalia
- Phylum: Arthropoda
- Class: Insecta
- Order: Diptera
- Family: Syrphidae
- Subfamily: Eristalinae
- Tribe: Milesiini
- Subtribe: Tropidiina
- Genus: Senogaster
- Species: S. dentipes

Binomial name
- Senogaster dentipes (Fabricius, 1787)

Synonyms
- Syrphus dentipes Fabricius, 1787; Milesia lineata Fabricius, 1805; Senogaster coerulescens Macquart, 1834; Senogaster comstocki Williston, 1882; Senogaster dentipes var. rufofemorata Doesburg, 1966

Species of fly

Senogaster dentipes is a species of hoverfly in the family Syrphidae.

== Distribution ==
Suriname, Brazil.
