= Tropidia insularis =

Scientific classification
- Kingdom: Animalia
- Phylum: Arthropoda
- Class: Insecta
- Order: Diptera
- Family: Syrphidae
- Subfamily: Eristalinae
- Tribe: Milesiini
- Genus: Tropidia
- Species: T. insularis

Binomial name
- Tropidia insularis Lynch Arribálzaga, 1892

Species of fly

Tropidia insularis is a species of hoverfly in the family Syrphidae.

== Distribution ==
Argentina.
