= Macrozelima hervei =

Scientific classification
- Kingdom: Animalia
- Phylum: Arthropoda
- Class: Insecta
- Order: Diptera
- Family: Syrphidae
- Subfamily: Eristalinae
- Tribe: Milesiini
- Subtribe: Tropidiina
- Genus: Macrozelima
- Species: M. hervei

Binomial name
- Macrozelima hervei (Shiraki, 1930)

Synonyms
- Zelima hervei Shiraki, 1930; Macrozelima bidentata Stackelberg, 1930

Species of fly

Macrozelima hervei is a species of syrphid fly in the family Syrphidae.

== Distribution ==
Japan.
