= Meropidia flavens =

Scientific classification
- Kingdom: Animalia
- Phylum: Arthropoda
- Clade: Pancrustacea
- Class: Insecta
- Order: Diptera
- Family: Syrphidae
- Subfamily: Eristalinae
- Tribe: Milesiini
- Subtribe: Tropidiina
- Genus: Meropidia
- Species: M. flavens

Binomial name
- Meropidia flavens Ståhls & Hippa, 2013

Species of fly

Meropidia flavens is a species of hoverfly in the family Syrphidae. Adult females measure about 11 mm (0.43 in). Males are unknown.

== Distribution ==
Meropidia flavens is known from Bogota, Colombia.
