= Orthoprosopa xylotaeformis =

Scientific classification
- Kingdom: Animalia
- Phylum: Arthropoda
- Clade: Pancrustacea
- Class: Insecta
- Order: Diptera
- Family: Syrphidae
- Subfamily: Eristalinae
- Tribe: Milesiini
- Subtribe: Tropidiina
- Genus: Orthoprosopa
- Subgenus: Orthoprosopa
- Species: O. xylotaeformis

Binomial name
- Orthoprosopa xylotaeformis (Schiner, 1868)

Synonyms
- Mallota xylotaeformis Schiner, 1868

Species of fly

Orthoprosopa xylotaeformis is a species of hoverfly in the family Syrphidae.

== Distribution ==
Australia. Originally given as Chile in error.
