= Archimicrodon =

Scientific classification
- Kingdom: Animalia
- Phylum: Arthropoda
- Clade: Pancrustacea
- Class: Insecta
- Order: Diptera
- Family: Syrphidae
- Subfamily: Microdontinae
- Genus: Archimicrodon; Hull, 1945

Type species
- Microdon (Archimicrodon) digitator Hull, 1937

Genus of flies

Archimicrodon is a genus of hoverflies. Many of the species in this genus were moved from Microdon by Reemer & Ståhls (2013). Previously, it had been described as having three known species.

== Biology ==
Larvae are found in ant nests.

== Distribution ==
All currently known species are found in the Old World tropics.

== Species ==
The species are divided into two subgenera: Archimicrodon Hull, 1945 and Hovamicrodon Keiser, 1971.

=== Subgenus Archimicrodon ===
- A. ampefyanus (Keiser, 1971)
- A. barringtonensis (Ferguson, 1926)
- A. boharti (Curran, 1947)
- A. brachycerus (Knab & Malloch, 1912)
- A. brevicornis (Loew, 1858)
- A. browni (Thompson, 1968)
- A. caeruleomaculatus (Keiser, 1971)
- A. caeruleus (Brunetti, 1908)
- A. clatratus (Keiser, 1971)
- A. clavicornis (Sack, 1926)
- A. fenestrellatus (Keiser, 1971)
- A. fergusoni (Goot, 1964)

= A. modestus (Ferguson, 1926)
= A. fergusoni (Thompson, 1968)

- A. grageti (Meijere, 1908)
- A. incisuralis (Walker, 1865)
- A. investigator (Hull, 1937)
- A. kavitahaius (Keiser, 1971)
- A. lanka (Keiser, 1958)
- A. liberiensis (Curran, 1929)
- A. limbinervis (Meijere, 1908)
- A. luctiferus (Walker, 1865)
- A. malagasicus (Keiser, 1971)
- A. malukensis Reemer, 2013
- A. minuticornis (Curran, 1931)
- A. nicholsoni (Ferguson, 1926)
- A. nigrocyaneus (Hull, 1964)
- A. novaeguineae (Meijere, 1908)
- A. obesus (Herve-Bazin, 1913)
- A. purpurescens (Shiraki, 1963)
- A. ranavalonae (Keiser, 1971)
- A. simplex (Shiraki, 1930)
- A. simplicicornis (Meijere, 1908)

= A. digitator (Hull, 1937)

- A. sudanus (Curran, 1923)
- A. tabanoides (Hull, 1944)
- A. tenuifrons (Curran, 1929)
- A. testaceus (Walker, 1857)
- A. varicornis (Sack, 1926)
- A. venosus (Walker, 1865)

= A. papuanus (Doesburg, 1959)

- A. vittatus (Macquart, 1850)

= A. transiens (Walker, 1852)
= A. pachypus (Bigot, 1884)

- A. wainwrighti (Curran, 1938)
