= Palumbia =

Scientific classification
- Kingdom: Animalia
- Phylum: Arthropoda
- Class: Insecta
- Order: Diptera
- Family: Syrphidae
- Subfamily: Eristalinae
- Tribe: Milesiini
- Subtribe: Temnostomina
- Genus: Palumbia; Rondani, 1865

Type species
- Palumbia sicula Rondani, 1865

Synonyms
- Priomerus Macquart, 1834

Genus of flies

Palumbia is a genus of hoverflies from the family Syrphidae, in the order Diptera.

== Species ==
Subgenus: Palumbia Rondani, 1865

- P. bellieri (Bigot, 1860)
- P. eristaloides (Portschinsky, 1887)
- P. inflata (Macquart, 1834)

Subgenus: Korinchia Edwards, 1919

- P. angustiabdomena Huo, Ren & Zheng, 2007
- P. pendleburyi (Curran, 1931)
- P. similinova Huo, Ren & Zheng, 2007
- P. simulans (Meijere, 1914)
- P. sinensis (Curran, 1929)
- P. tenax Thompson, 1975
- P. vivax Thompson, 1975
