= Nepenthosyrphus capitatus =

Scientific classification
- Kingdom: Animalia
- Phylum: Arthropoda
- Class: Insecta
- Order: Diptera
- Family: Syrphidae
- Subfamily: Eristalinae
- Tribe: Milesiini
- Subtribe: Tropidiina
- Genus: Nepenthosyrphus
- Species: N. capitatus

Binomial name
- Nepenthosyrphus capitatus (Sack, 1931)

Synonyms
- Nepenthosyrphus tobaicus de Meijere, 1932; Syritta capitatus Sack, 1931

Species of fly

Nepenthosyrphus capitatus is a species of hoverfly in the family Syrphidae.

== Distribution ==
Sumatra.
