= Nepenthosyrphus malayanus =

Scientific classification
- Kingdom: Animalia
- Phylum: Arthropoda
- Class: Insecta
- Order: Diptera
- Family: Syrphidae
- Subfamily: Eristalinae
- Tribe: Milesiini
- Subtribe: Tropidiina
- Genus: Nepenthosyrphus
- Species: N. malayanus

Binomial name
- Nepenthosyrphus malayanus Hippa, 1978

Species of fly

Nepenthosyrphus malayanus is a species of hoverfly in the family Syrphidae.

== Distribution ==
Malaysia.
