= Sterphus shannoni =

Scientific classification
- Kingdom: Animalia
- Phylum: Arthropoda
- Clade: Pancrustacea
- Class: Insecta
- Order: Diptera
- Family: Syrphidae
- Subfamily: Eristalinae
- Tribe: Milesiini
- Subtribe: Xylotina
- Genus: Sterphus
- Species: S. shannoni

Binomial name
- Sterphus shannoni Thompson, 1973

Species of fly

Sterphus shannoni is a species of hoverfly in the family Syrphidae.

== Distribution ==
Brazil.
