= Orthoprosopa multicolor =

Scientific classification
- Kingdom: Animalia
- Phylum: Arthropoda
- Clade: Pancrustacea
- Class: Insecta
- Order: Diptera
- Family: Syrphidae
- Subfamily: Eristalinae
- Tribe: Milesiini
- Subtribe: Tropidiina
- Genus: Orthoprosopa
- Subgenus: Paratropidia
- Species: O. multicolor

Binomial name
- Orthoprosopa multicolor (Ferguson, 1926)

Synonyms
- Criorrhina multicolor Ferguson, 1926

Species of fly

Orthoprosopa multicolor is a species of hoverfly in the family Syrphidae.

== Distribution ==
Australia.
