= Sterphus venezuelaensis =

Scientific classification
- Kingdom: Animalia
- Phylum: Arthropoda
- Class: Insecta
- Order: Diptera
- Family: Syrphidae
- Subfamily: Eristalinae
- Tribe: Milesiini
- Subtribe: Xylotina
- Genus: Sterphus
- Species: S. venezuelaensis

Binomial name
- Sterphus venezuelaensis Thompson, 1994

Species of fly

Sterphus venezuelaensis is a species of Hoverfly in the family Syrphidae.

== Distribution ==
Venezuela.
