= Meropidia nitida =

Scientific classification
- Kingdom: Animalia
- Phylum: Arthropoda
- Clade: Pancrustacea
- Class: Insecta
- Order: Diptera
- Family: Syrphidae
- Subfamily: Eristalinae
- Tribe: Milesiini
- Subtribe: Tropidiina
- Genus: Meropidia
- Species: M. nitida

Binomial name
- Meropidia nitida Morales, 2013

Species of hoverfly

Meropidia nitida is a species of hoverfly in the family Syrphidae, tribe Milesiini.

== Description ==
The size of the adult female Meropidia nitidia is 9–10.5 mm (0.35–0.41 in). The main colours on the body are yellow and brown.

== Distribution ==
Meropidia nitida is known from the Amboró National Park in central Bolivia. The types were collected at 2,070 m (6,790 ft) above sea level.
