= Sterphus intermedius =

Scientific classification
- Kingdom: Animalia
- Phylum: Arthropoda
- Clade: Pancrustacea
- Class: Insecta
- Order: Diptera
- Family: Syrphidae
- Subfamily: Eristalinae
- Tribe: Milesiini
- Subtribe: Xylotina
- Genus: Sterphus
- Species: S. intermedius

Binomial name
- Sterphus intermedius Thompson, 1973

Species of fly

Sterphus intermedius is a species of Hoverfly in the family Syrphidae.

== Distribution ==
Bolivia.
