= Orthoprosopa grisea =

Scientific classification
- Kingdom: Animalia
- Phylum: Arthropoda
- Clade: Pancrustacea
- Class: Insecta
- Order: Diptera
- Family: Syrphidae
- Subfamily: Eristalinae
- Tribe: Milesiini
- Subtribe: Tropidiina
- Genus: Orthoprosopa
- Subgenus: Orthoprosopa
- Species: O. grisea

Binomial name
- Orthoprosopa grisea (Walker, 1835)

Synonyms
- Helophilus griseus Walker, 1835; Merodon contrarius Walker, 1849; Merodon torpidus Walker, 1857; Orthoprosopa nigra Macquart, 1850; Orthoprosopa binotata Thomson, 1869

Species of fly

Orthoprosopa grisea is a species of hoverfly in the family Syrphidae.

== Distribution ==
Australia.
