= Nepenthosyrphus oudemansi =

Scientific classification
- Kingdom: Animalia
- Phylum: Arthropoda
- Class: Insecta
- Order: Diptera
- Family: Syrphidae
- Subfamily: Eristalinae
- Tribe: Milesiini
- Subtribe: Tropidiina
- Genus: Nepenthosyrphus
- Species: N. oudemansi

Binomial name
- Nepenthosyrphus oudemansi de Meijere, 1932

Species of fly

Nepenthosyrphus oudemansi is a species of hoverfly in the family Syrphidae.

== Distribution ==
Borneo.
