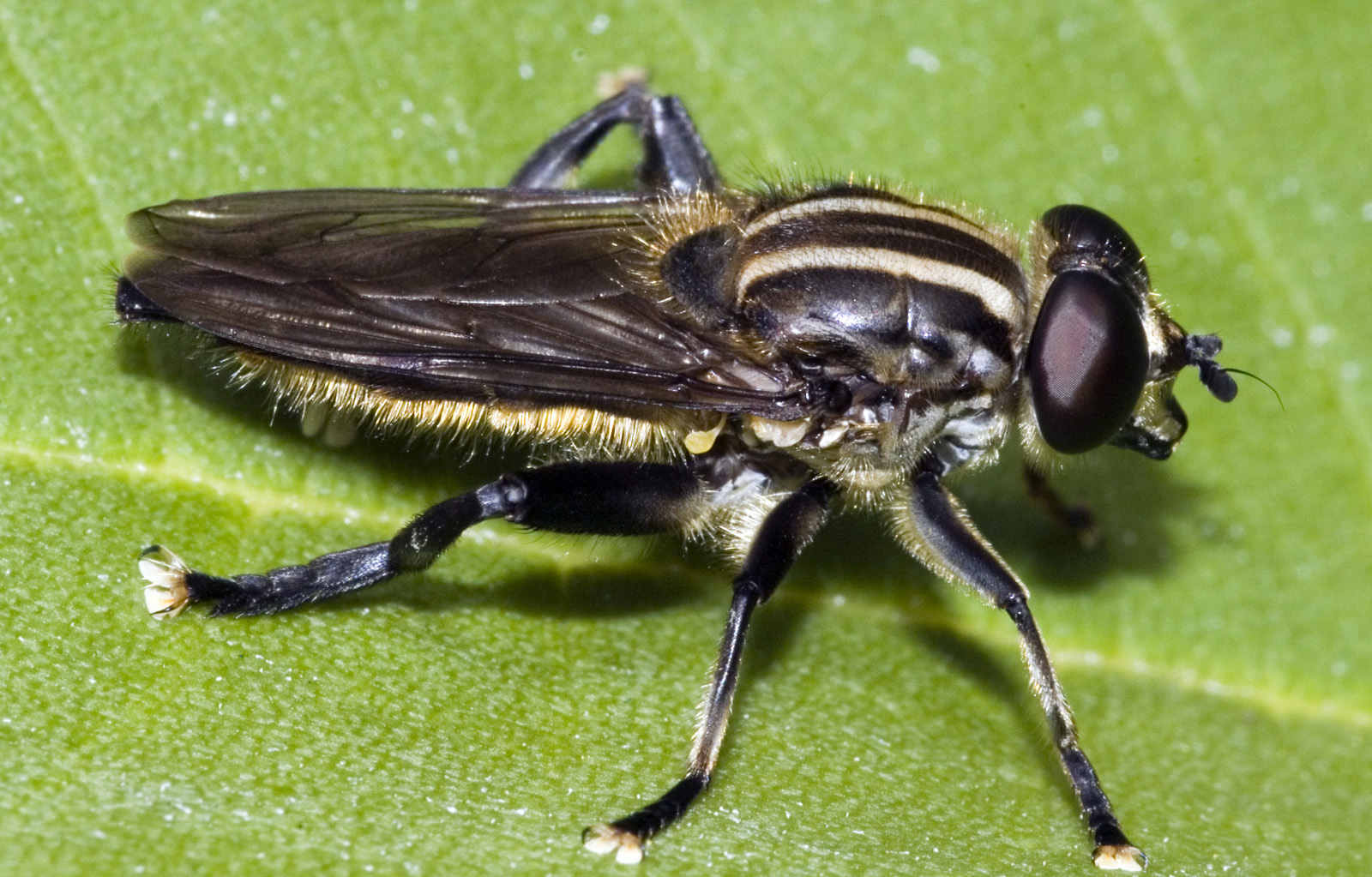

Scientific classification
- Kingdom: Animalia
- Phylum: Arthropoda
- Clade: Pancrustacea
- Class: Insecta
- Order: Diptera
- Family: Syrphidae
- Subfamily: Eristalinae
- Tribe: Milesiini
- Subtribe: Tropidiina
- Genus: Orthoprosopa
- Subgenus: Paratropidia
- Species: O. bilineata

Binomial name
- Orthoprosopa bilineata (Walker, 1849)

Synonyms
- Milesia bilineata Walker, 1849

= Orthoprosopa bilineata =

Species of fly

Orthoprosopa bilineata is a species of hoverfly in the family Syrphidae.

== Distribution ==
O. bilineata is found in New Zealand.
