= Orthoprosopa pacifica =

Scientific classification
- Kingdom: Animalia
- Phylum: Arthropoda
- Clade: Pancrustacea
- Class: Insecta
- Order: Diptera
- Family: Syrphidae
- Subfamily: Eristalinae
- Tribe: Milesiini
- Subtribe: Tropidiina
- Genus: Orthoprosopa
- Subgenus: Paratropidia
- Species: O. pacifica

Binomial name
- Orthoprosopa pacifica (Hippa, 1980)

Synonyms
- Paratropidia pacifica Hippa, 1980

Species of fly

Orthoprosopa pacifica is a species of hoverfly in the family Syrphidae.

== Distribution ==
Orthoprosopa pacifica is known from New Caledonia. It has been collected at about 150–460 m (500–1,500 ft) above sea level.
