= Palumbia eristaloides =

Scientific classification
- Kingdom: Animalia
- Phylum: Arthropoda
- Class: Insecta
- Order: Diptera
- Family: Syrphidae
- Subfamily: Eristalinae
- Tribe: Milesiini
- Subtribe: Temnostomina
- Genus: Palumbia
- Subgenus: Palumbia
- Species: P. eristaloides

Binomial name
- Palumbia eristaloides (Portschinsky, 1887)

Synonyms
- Milesia eristaloides Portschinsky, 1887; Palumbia flavipes Paramonov, 1927

Species of fly

Palumbia eristaloides is a species of hoverfly in the family Syrphidae.

== Distribution ==
Palearctic.
