= Palumbia inflata =

Scientific classification
- Kingdom: Animalia
- Phylum: Arthropoda
- Class: Insecta
- Order: Diptera
- Family: Syrphidae
- Subfamily: Eristalinae
- Tribe: Milesiini
- Subtribe: Temnostomina
- Genus: Palumbia
- Subgenus: Palumbia
- Species: P. inflata

Binomial name
- Palumbia inflata (Macquart, 1834)

Synonyms
- Eristalis inflatus Macquart, 1834

Species of fly

Palumbia inflata is a species of hoverfly in the family Syrphidae.

== Distribution ==
The species is native to North America.
