= Tropidia rostrata =

Scientific classification
- Kingdom: Animalia
- Phylum: Arthropoda
- Class: Insecta
- Order: Diptera
- Family: Syrphidae
- Subfamily: Eristalinae
- Tribe: Milesiini
- Genus: Tropidia
- Species: T. rostrata

Binomial name
- Tropidia rostrata Shiraki, 1930

Species of fly

Tropidia rostrata is a species of hoverfly in the family Syrphidae.

== Distribution ==
United States.
