= Sterphus coarctatus =

Scientific classification
- Kingdom: Animalia
- Phylum: Arthropoda
- Clade: Pancrustacea
- Class: Insecta
- Order: Diptera
- Family: Syrphidae
- Subfamily: Eristalinae
- Tribe: Milesiini
- Subtribe: Xylotina
- Genus: Sterphus
- Species: S. coarctatus

Binomial name
- Sterphus coarctatus (Wiedemann, 1830)

Synonyms
- Xylota coarctatus Wiedemann, 1830; Senoceria spinifemoratus Hull, 1930

Species of fly

Sterphus coarctatus is a species of Hoverfly in the family Syrphidae.

== Distribution ==
Panama, Brazil.
