= Sterphus coeruleus =

Scientific classification
- Kingdom: Animalia
- Phylum: Arthropoda
- Clade: Pancrustacea
- Class: Insecta
- Order: Diptera
- Family: Syrphidae
- Subfamily: Eristalinae
- Tribe: Milesiini
- Subtribe: Xylotina
- Genus: Sterphus
- Species: S. coeruleus

Binomial name
- Sterphus coeruleus (Rondani, 1863)

Synonyms
- Xylota coerulea Rondani, 1863; Sterphus autumnalis Philippi, 1865; Xylota aurifacies Schiner, 1868

Species of fly

Sterphus coeruleus is a species of Hoverfly in the family Syrphidae.

== Distribution ==
Chile, Argentina.
