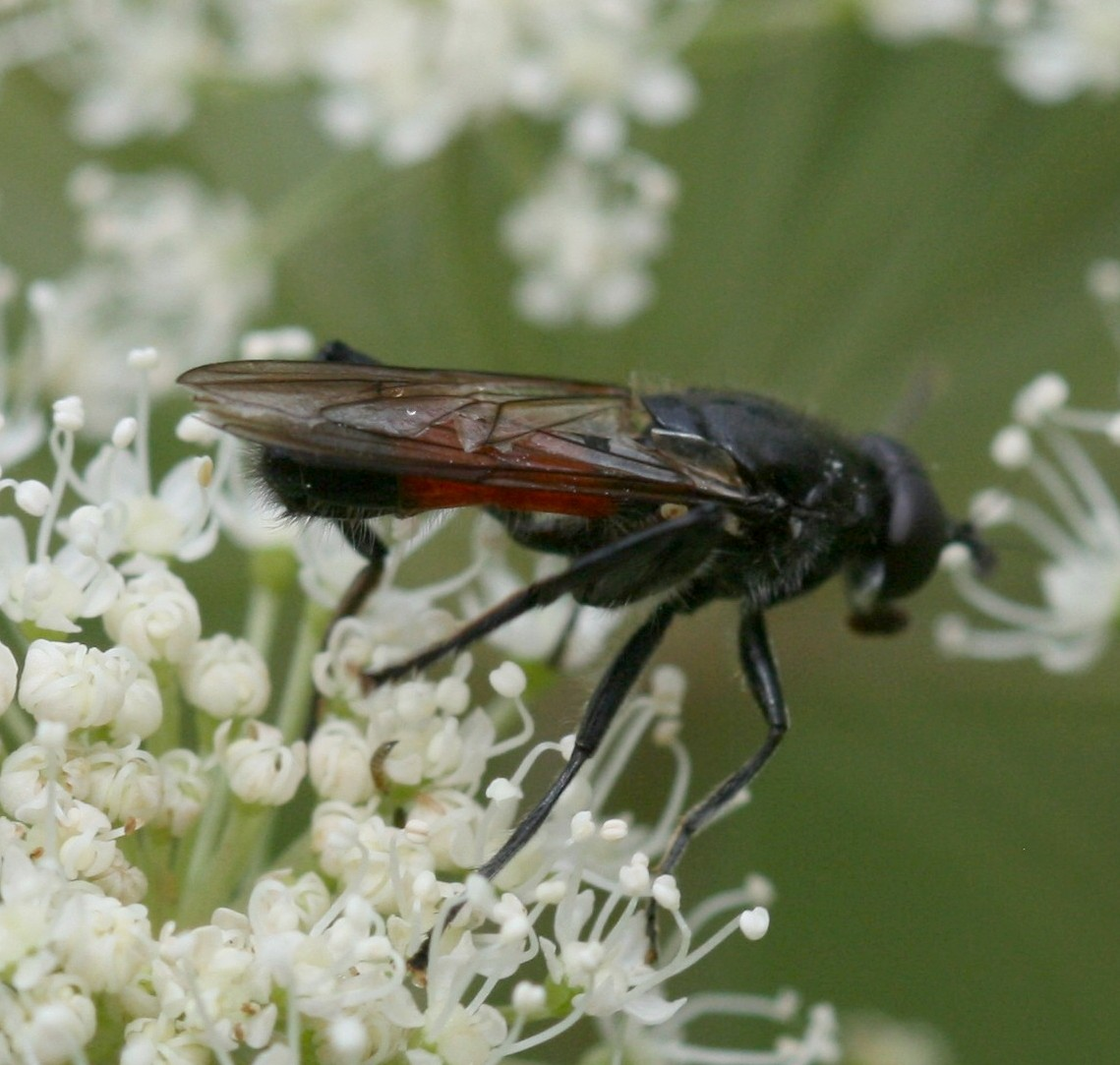

Scientific classification
- Kingdom: Animalia
- Phylum: Arthropoda
- Class: Insecta
- Order: Diptera
- Family: Syrphidae
- Genus: Brachypalpoides
- Species: B. lentus

Binomial name
- Brachypalpoides lentus Meigen, 1822

= Brachypalpoides lentus =

Species of fly

Brachypalpoides lentus is a European species of hoverflies.

== Description ==
External images Wing length 10–12 mm. The legs are black; tergites 2 and 3, and base of tergite 4 in female, red. Tip of abdomen black. Mimics sawflies. The larva is not described but is included in keys in It is illustrated by Rotheray (1993)

== Distribution ==
Scandinavia South to the Pyrenees and central Spain. Ireland East through central Europe into European parts of Russia; southern Europe East to Yugoslavia and Greece and into Asia Minor.

== Habitat ==
A forest species associated with mature trees of Fagus, Picea and Quercus and including evergreen oak forest.

== Biology ==
Runs on foliage of bushes of Rubus fruticosus at the edge of forest clearings and on the ground near fallen or felled trees. Flowers visited include umbellifers, Galium, Crataegus, Rubus idaeus, Sorbus aucuparia. Flight period is April to June (and July at higher altitudes).
