= Tropidia longa =

Scientific classification
- Kingdom: Animalia
- Phylum: Arthropoda
- Class: Insecta
- Order: Diptera
- Family: Syrphidae
- Subfamily: Eristalinae
- Tribe: Milesiini
- Genus: Tropidia
- Species: T. longa

Binomial name
- Tropidia longa (Walker, 1849)

Synonyms
- Helophilus longus Walker, 1849; Tropidia dicentria Speiser, 1913

Species of fly

Tropidia longa is a species of hoverfly in the family Syrphidae.

== Distribution ==
French Cameroon, Madagascar, Nigeria.
