= Sterphus nigrita =

Scientific classification
- Kingdom: Animalia
- Phylum: Arthropoda
- Clade: Pancrustacea
- Class: Insecta
- Order: Diptera
- Family: Syrphidae
- Tribe: Milesiini
- Subtribe: Xylotina
- Genus: Sterphus
- Species: S. nigrita

Binomial name
- Sterphus nigrita (Fabricius, 1781)

Synonyms
- Syrphus nigrita Fabricius, 1781; Musca jamaicensis (Gmelin, 1790); Crepidomyia tricrepis Shannon, 1926; Crepidomyia darlingtoni Hull, 1944; Crepidomyia dion (Hull, 1951); Musca nigrana Turton, 1801; Xylota genuinus Williston, 1888

Species of fly

Sterphus nigrita is a species of Hoverfly in the family Syrphidae.

== Distribution ==
Jamaica.
