= Tropidia flavipicta =

Scientific classification
- Kingdom: Animalia
- Phylum: Arthropoda
- Class: Insecta
- Order: Diptera
- Family: Syrphidae
- Subfamily: Eristalinae
- Tribe: Milesiini
- Genus: Tropidia
- Species: T. flavipicta

Binomial name
- Tropidia flavipicta (Bigot, 1859)

Synonyms
- Syritta flavipicta Bigot, 1859

Species of fly

Tropidia flavipicta is a species of hoverfly in the family Syrphidae.

== Distribution ==
Madagascar.
