= Tropidia fasciata =

Scientific classification
- Kingdom: Animalia
- Phylum: Arthropoda
- Class: Insecta
- Order: Diptera
- Family: Syrphidae
- Subfamily: Eristalinae
- Tribe: Milesiini
- Genus: Tropidia
- Species: T. fasciata

Binomial name
- Tropidia fasciata Meigen, 1822

Synonyms
- Parrhyngia quadrimaculata Shiraki, 1968; Tropidia marsanii Perris, 1852

Species of fly

Tropidia fasciata is a species of Hoverfly in the family Syrphidae.

== Distribution ==
Germany.
