= Meropidia =

Scientific classification
- Kingdom: Animalia
- Phylum: Arthropoda
- Clade: Pancrustacea
- Class: Insecta
- Order: Diptera
- Family: Syrphidae
- Subfamily: Eristalinae
- Tribe: Milesiini
- Subtribe: Tropidiina
- Genus: Meropidia; Hippa & Thompson, 1983

Type species
- Meropidia neurostigma Hippa, 1983

Genus of flies

Meropidia is a South American genus of hoverflies in the subfamily Eristalinae.

== Species ==
There are five accepted species:

- Meropidia flavens Ståhls & Hippa, 2013
- Meropidia neurostigma Hippa, 1983
- Meropidia nigropilosa Thompson, 1983
- Meropidia nitida Morales, 2013
- Meropidia rufa Thompson, 1983
