= Palumbia pendleburyi =

Scientific classification
- Kingdom: Animalia
- Phylum: Arthropoda
- Class: Insecta
- Order: Diptera
- Family: Syrphidae
- Subfamily: Eristalinae
- Tribe: Milesiini
- Subtribe: Temnostomina
- Genus: Palumbia
- Subgenus: Korincha
- Species: P. pendleburyi

Binomial name
- Palumbia pendleburyi (Curran, 1931)

Synonyms
- Korinchia pendleburyi Curran, 1929

Species of fly

Palumbia pendleburyi is a species of hoverfly in the family Syrphidae.

== Distribution ==
Borneo.
