= Tropidia coloradensis =

Scientific classification
- Kingdom: Animalia
- Phylum: Arthropoda
- Class: Insecta
- Order: Diptera
- Family: Syrphidae
- Subfamily: Eristalinae
- Tribe: Milesiini
- Genus: Tropidia
- Species: T. coloradensis

Binomial name
- Tropidia coloradensis (Bigot, 1884)

Synonyms
- Xylota coloradensis Bigot, 1884

Species of fly

Tropidia coloradensis is a species of hoverfly in the family Syrphidae.

== Distribution ==
United States.
