= Tropidia nigricornis =

Scientific classification
- Kingdom: Animalia
- Phylum: Arthropoda
- Class: Insecta
- Order: Diptera
- Family: Syrphidae
- Subfamily: Eristalinae
- Tribe: Milesiini
- Genus: Tropidia
- Species: T. nigricornis

Binomial name
- Tropidia nigricornis Philippi, 1865

Synonyms
- Xylota bivittata Bigot, 1884

Species of fly

Tropidia nigricornis is a species of hoverfly in the family Syrphidae.

== Distribution ==
Chile.
