= Sterphus fascithorax =

Scientific classification
- Kingdom: Animalia
- Phylum: Arthropoda
- Clade: Pancrustacea
- Class: Insecta
- Order: Diptera
- Family: Syrphidae
- Subfamily: Eristalinae
- Tribe: Milesiini
- Subtribe: Xylotina
- Genus: Sterphus
- Species: S. fascithorax

Binomial name
- Sterphus fascithorax (Williston, 1888)

Synonyms
- Ceriogaster fascithorax Williston, 1888; Ceriogaster foscithorax Williston, 1888; Ceriogaster fuscithorax Shannon, 1926; Ceriogaster fascithorax Kertész, 1910

Species of fly

Sterphus fascithorax is a species of Hoverfly in the family Syrphidae.

== Distribution ==
Brazil.
