= Tropidia notata =

Scientific classification
- Kingdom: Animalia
- Phylum: Arthropoda
- Class: Insecta
- Order: Diptera
- Family: Syrphidae
- Subfamily: Eristalinae
- Tribe: Milesiini
- Genus: Tropidia
- Species: T. notata

Binomial name
- Tropidia notata (Bigot, 1882)

Synonyms
- Ortholophus notata Bigot, 1882

Species of fly

Tropidia notata is a species of hoverfly in the family Syrphidae.

== Distribution ==
Chile, Argentina.
