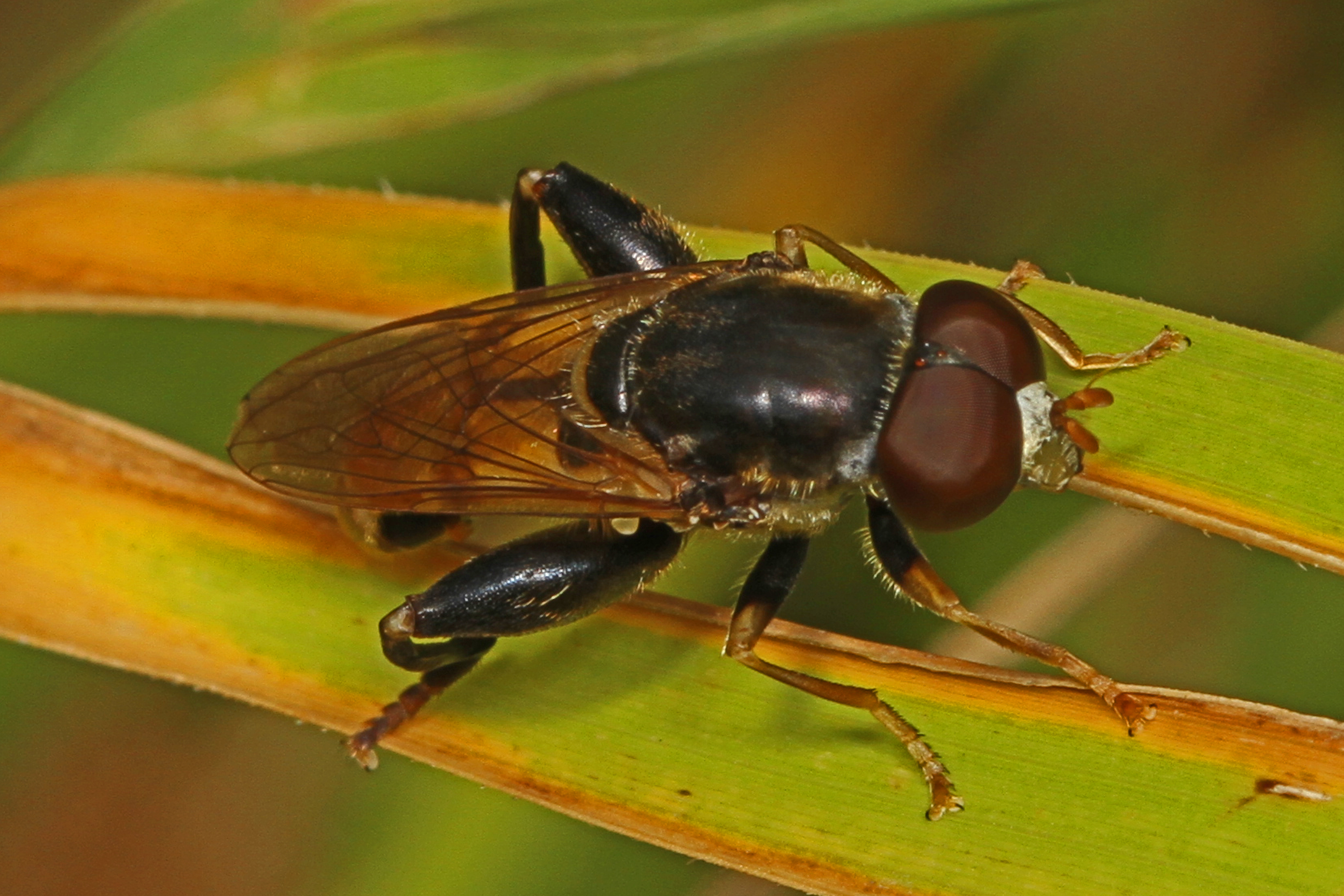

Scientific classification
- Kingdom: Animalia
- Phylum: Arthropoda
- Class: Insecta
- Order: Diptera
- Family: Syrphidae
- Subfamily: Eristalinae
- Tribe: Milesiini
- Genus: Tropidia
- Species: T. quadrata

Binomial name
- Tropidia quadrata (Say, 1824)

Synonyms
- Xylota quadrata Say, 1824

= Tropidia quadrata =

Species of fly

Tropidia quadrata, commonly known as the common thickleg fly, is a common species of syrphid fly observed across the north-central United states and southern Canada. Hoverflies can remain nearly motionless in flight. The adults are also known as flower flies for they are commonly found on flowers, from which they get both energy-giving nectar and protein rich pollen. The larvae are aquatic.

== Distribution ==
Canada, United States.
