= Sterphus transversus =

Scientific classification
- Kingdom: Animalia
- Phylum: Arthropoda
- Class: Insecta
- Order: Diptera
- Family: Syrphidae
- Subfamily: Eristalinae
- Tribe: Milesiini
- Subtribe: Xylotina
- Genus: Sterphus
- Species: S. transversus

Binomial name
- Sterphus transversus (Walker, 1857)

Synonyms
- Syritta transversa Walker, 1857

Species of fly

Sterphus transversus is a species of Hoverfly in the family Syrphidae.

== Distribution ==
Brazil.
