= Palumbia sinensis =

Scientific classification
- Kingdom: Animalia
- Phylum: Arthropoda
- Class: Insecta
- Order: Diptera
- Family: Syrphidae
- Subfamily: Eristalinae
- Tribe: Milesiini
- Subtribe: Temnostomina
- Genus: Palumbia
- Subgenus: Korincha
- Species: P. sinensis

Binomial name
- Palumbia sinensis (Curran, 1929)

Synonyms
- Korinchia sinensis Curran, 1929

Species of fly

Palumbia sinensis is a species of hoverfly in the family Syrphidae.

== Distribution ==
China.
