= Sterphus batesi =

Scientific classification
- Kingdom: Animalia
- Phylum: Arthropoda
- Clade: Pancrustacea
- Class: Insecta
- Order: Diptera
- Family: Syrphidae
- Subfamily: Eristalinae
- Tribe: Milesiini
- Subtribe: Xylotina
- Genus: Sterphus
- Species: S. batesi

Binomial name
- Sterphus batesi (Shannon, 1926)

Synonyms
- Tatuomyia batesi Shannon, 1926

Species of fly

Sterphus batesi is a species of Hoverfly in the family Syrphidae.

== Distribution ==
Brazil.
