= Tropidia flavimana =

Scientific classification
- Kingdom: Animalia
- Phylum: Arthropoda
- Class: Insecta
- Order: Diptera
- Family: Syrphidae
- Subfamily: Eristalinae
- Tribe: Milesiini
- Genus: Tropidia
- Species: T. flavimana

Binomial name
- Tropidia flavimana Philippi, 1865

Species of fly

Tropidia flavimana is a species of hoverfly in the family Syrphidae.

== Distribution ==
Chile, Argentina.
