= Sterphus aureopila =

Scientific classification
- Kingdom: Animalia
- Phylum: Arthropoda
- Clade: Pancrustacea
- Class: Insecta
- Order: Diptera
- Family: Syrphidae
- Subfamily: Eristalinae
- Tribe: Milesiini
- Subtribe: Xylotina
- Genus: Sterphus
- Species: S. aureopila

Binomial name
- Sterphus aureopila (Hull, 1941)

Synonyms
- Ceriogaster aureopila Hull, 1941

Species of fly

Sterphus aureopila is a species of Hoverfly in the family Syrphidae.

== Distribution ==
Panama.
