= Palumbia simulans =

Scientific classification
- Kingdom: Animalia
- Phylum: Arthropoda
- Class: Insecta
- Order: Diptera
- Family: Syrphidae
- Subfamily: Eristalinae
- Tribe: Milesiini
- Subtribe: Temnostomina
- Genus: Palumbia
- Subgenus: Korincha
- Species: P. simulans

Binomial name
- Palumbia simulans (Meijere, 1914)

Synonyms
- Milesia simulans Meijere, 1914

Species of fly

Palumbia simulans is a species of hoverfly in the family Syrphidae.

== Distribution ==
Java, Laos, Sumatra.
