= Nepenthosyrphus =

Scientific classification
- Kingdom: Animalia
- Phylum: Arthropoda
- Class: Insecta
- Order: Diptera
- Family: Syrphidae
- Subfamily: Eristalinae
- Tribe: Milesiini
- Subtribe: Tropidiina
- Genus: Nepenthosyrphus de Meijere, 1932

Type species
- Nepenthosyrphus tobaicus de Meijere, 1932

Genus of flies

Nepenthosyrphus is a genus of hoverflies in the subfamily Eristalinae.

== Species ==
- Nepenthosyrphus capitatus (Sack, 1931)
- Nepenthosyrphus malayanus Hippa, 1978
- Nepenthosyrphus meijerei Rotheray, 2012
- Nepenthosyrphus oudemansi Meijere, 1932
- Nepenthosyrphus venustus Thompson, 1971
