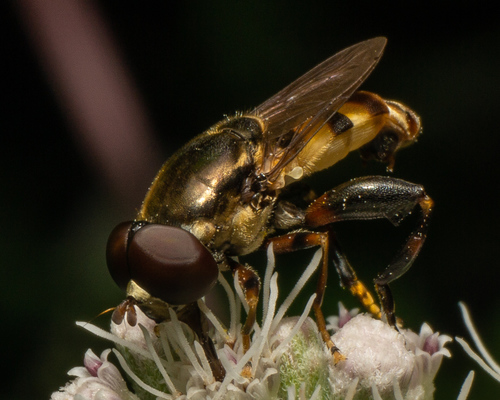
- Tropidia albistylum

Scientific classification
- Kingdom: Animalia
- Phylum: Arthropoda
- Class: Insecta
- Order: Diptera
- Family: Syrphidae
- Subfamily: Eristalinae
- Tribe: Milesiini
- Genus: Tropidia
- Species: T. albistylum

Binomial name
- Tropidia albistylum Macquart, 1847

= Tropidia albistylum =

Species of fly

Tropidia albistylum (Macquart, 1847), the Yellow-thighed Thickleg Fly, is a rare species of syrphid fly observed across the eastern and central United States. Hoverflies can remain nearly motionless in flight. The adults are also known as flower flies for they are commonly found on flowers, from which they get both energy-giving nectar and protein-rich pollen. The larvae are aquatic.

== Distribution ==
It is found in the eastern United States and Canada, with records as far west as Nebraska and north to Norfolk County, Ontario.
