= Palumbia bellieri =

Conservation status
- Endangered (IUCN 3.1)

Scientific classification
- Kingdom: Animalia
- Phylum: Arthropoda
- Class: Insecta
- Order: Diptera
- Family: Syrphidae
- Subfamily: Eristalinae
- Tribe: Milesiini
- Subtribe: Temnostomina
- Genus: Palumbia
- Subgenus: Palumbia
- Species: P. bellieri

Binomial name
- Palumbia bellieri (Bigot, 1860)

Synonyms
- Sphixea bellierii Bigot, 1860; Palumbia sicula Rondani, 1865

Species of fly

Palumbia bellieri is a species of hoverfly in the family Syrphidae.

== Distribution ==
Italy.
