= Paratropidia =

Scientific classification
- Kingdom: Animalia
- Phylum: Arthropoda
- Class: Insecta
- Order: Diptera
- Family: Syrphidae
- Subfamily: Eristalinae
- Tribe: Milesiini
- Subtribe: Tropidiina
- Genus: Orthoprosopa
- Subgenus: Paratropidia; Hull, 1949

Type species
- Milesia bilineata Walker, 1849)

Genus of flies

Paratropidia is a subgenus of hoverflies from the family Syrphidae, in the order Diptera.

== Species ==
- Orthoprosopa alex (Thompson, 1972)
- Orthoprosopa bilineata (Walker, 1849)
- Orthoprosopa margarita (Thompson, 1972)
- Orthoprosopa multicolor (Ferguson, 1926)
- Orthoprosopa pacifica (Hippa, 1980)
