= Tropidia namorana =

Scientific classification
- Kingdom: Animalia
- Phylum: Arthropoda
- Class: Insecta
- Order: Diptera
- Family: Syrphidae
- Subfamily: Eristalinae
- Tribe: Milesiini
- Genus: Tropidia
- Species: T. namorana

Binomial name
- Tropidia namorana Keiser, 1971

Species of fly

Tropidia namorana is a species of hoverfly in the family Syrphidae.

== Distribution ==
Madagascar.
