= Sterphus plagiatus =

Scientific classification
- Kingdom: Animalia
- Phylum: Arthropoda
- Clade: Pancrustacea
- Class: Insecta
- Order: Diptera
- Family: Syrphidae
- Subfamily: Eristalinae
- Tribe: Milesiini
- Subtribe: Xylotina
- Genus: Sterphus
- Species: S. plagiatus

Binomial name
- Sterphus plagiatus (Wiedemann, 1830)

Synonyms
- Xylota plagiatus Wiedemann, 1830

Species of fly

Sterphus plagiatus is a species of Hoverfly in the family Syrphidae.

== Distribution ==
Guyana, Peru, Brazil.
