= Orthoprosopa =

Scientific classification
- Kingdom: Animalia
- Phylum: Arthropoda
- Class: Insecta
- Order: Diptera
- Family: Syrphidae
- Subfamily: Eristalinae
- Tribe: Milesiini
- Subtribe: Tropidiina
- Genus: Orthoprosopa; Macquart, 1850

Type species
- Orthoprosopa nigra Macquart, 1850

Genus of flies

Orthoprosopa is a genus of hoverflies from the family Syrphidae, in the order Diptera.

== Species ==
Subgenus: Orthoprosopa Macquart, 1850

- Orthoprosopa grisea (Walker, 1835)
- Orthoprosopa xylotaeformis (Schiner, 1868)

Subgenus: Paratropidia Hull, 1949

- Orthoprosopa alex (Thompson, 1972)
- Orthoprosopa bilineata (Walker, 1849)
- Orthoprosopa margarita (Thompson, 1972)
- Orthoprosopa multicolor (Ferguson, 1926)
- Orthoprosopa pacifica (Hippa, 1980)
