= Tropidia calcarata =

Scientific classification
- Kingdom: Animalia
- Phylum: Arthropoda
- Class: Insecta
- Order: Diptera
- Family: Syrphidae
- Subfamily: Eristalinae
- Tribe: Milesiini
- Genus: Tropidia
- Species: T. calcarata

Binomial name
- Tropidia calcarata Williston, 1887

Species of fly

Tropidia calcarata (Williston, 1887), the Lily-loving Thickleg Fly, is a rare species of syrphid fly observed from northeastern North America. Hoverflies can remain nearly motionless in flight. The adults are also known as flower flies for they are commonly found on flowers, from which they get both energy-giving nectar and protein-rich pollen. The larvae have been found on the rotting roots of an aquatic lily.

== Distribution ==
Canada, United States
