= Sterphus chloropyga =

Scientific classification
- Kingdom: Animalia
- Phylum: Arthropoda
- Clade: Pancrustacea
- Class: Insecta
- Order: Diptera
- Family: Syrphidae
- Subfamily: Eristalinae
- Tribe: Milesiini
- Subtribe: Xylotina
- Genus: Sterphus
- Species: S. chloropyga

Binomial name
- Sterphus chloropyga (Schiner, 1868)

Synonyms
- Xylota chloropyga Schiner, 1868

Species of fly

Sterphus chloropyga is a species of Hoverfly in the family Syrphidae.

== Distribution ==
Colombia.
