= Hovamicrodon =

Scientific classification
- Kingdom: Animalia
- Phylum: Arthropoda
- Class: Insecta
- Order: Diptera
- Family: Syrphidae
- Subfamily: Microdontinae
- Genus: Archimicrodon
- Subgenus: Hovamicrodon; Keiser, 1971

Type species
- Hovamicrodon silvester Keiser, 1971

Subgenus of flies

Hovamicrodon is a subgenus of the hoverfly genus Archimicrodon, endemic to Madagascar. Hovamicrodon is distinguished by a particular type of scutellar calcar, being broad and blunt apically.

== Species ==
The six known species are:

- A. flavifacies (Keiser, 1971)
- A. fuscipennis (Keiser, 1971)
- A. hova (Herve-Bazin, 1913)
- A. nubecula (Keiser, 1971)
- A. silvester (Keiser, 1971)
- A. vulpicolor (Hull, 1941)
