= Sterphus scutellata =

Scientific classification
- Kingdom: Animalia
- Phylum: Arthropoda
- Clade: Pancrustacea
- Class: Insecta
- Order: Diptera
- Family: Syrphidae
- Subfamily: Eristalinae
- Tribe: Milesiini
- Subtribe: Xylotina
- Genus: Sterphus
- Species: S. scutellata

Binomial name
- Sterphus scutellata (Curran, 1934)

Synonyms
- Ceriogaster scutellata Curran, 1934

Species of fly

Sterphus scutellata is a species of Hoverfly in the family Syrphidae. It is found in Guyana.
