= Tropidia mamillata =

Scientific classification
- Kingdom: Animalia
- Phylum: Arthropoda
- Class: Insecta
- Order: Diptera
- Family: Syrphidae
- Subfamily: Eristalinae
- Tribe: Milesiini
- Genus: Tropidia
- Species: T. mamillata

Binomial name
- Tropidia mamillata Loew, 1861

Species of fly

Tropidia mamillata is a species of hoverfly in the family Syrphidae.

== Distribution ==
United States.
