= Sterphus cybele =

Scientific classification
- Kingdom: Animalia
- Phylum: Arthropoda
- Clade: Pancrustacea
- Class: Insecta
- Order: Diptera
- Family: Syrphidae
- Subfamily: Eristalinae
- Tribe: Milesiini
- Subtribe: Xylotina
- Genus: Sterphus
- Species: S. cybele

Binomial name
- Sterphus cybele (Hull, 1951)

Synonyms
- Crepidomyia cybele Hull, 1951

Species of fly

Sterphus cybele is a species of Hoverfly in the family Syrphidae.

== Distribution ==
Colombia, Peru.
