= Palumbia similinova =

Scientific classification
- Kingdom: Animalia
- Phylum: Arthropoda
- Class: Insecta
- Order: Diptera
- Family: Syrphidae
- Subfamily: Eristalinae
- Tribe: Milesiini
- Subtribe: Temnostomina
- Genus: Palumbia
- Subgenus: Korincha
- Species: P. similinova

Binomial name
- Palumbia similinova Huo, Ren & Zheng, 2007

Species of fly

Palumbia similinova is a species of hoverfly in the family Syrphidae.

== Distribution ==
China.
