= Ceratophya =

Scientific classification
- Kingdom: Animalia
- Phylum: Arthropoda
- Clade: Pancrustacea
- Class: Insecta
- Order: Diptera
- Family: Syrphidae
- Subfamily: Microdontinae
- Genus: Ceratophya; Wiedemann, 1824

Type species
- Ceratophya notata Wiedemann, 1824

Synonyms
- Ceratophyia Osten Sacken, 1858

Genus of flies

Ceratophya is a genus of hoverflies, with five known species. They are distinct from Microdon by the presence of an appendix on vein R4+5. Many species have erroneously been placed in this genus. Some authors place Ceratophya as a subgenus of Microdon.

== Biology ==
Larvae are found in ant nests.

== Distribution ==
Distribution is Neotropical.

== Species ==
There are five known species as of 2013:

- C. argentinensis Reemer, 2013
- C. carinifacies (Curran, 1934)
- C. notata Wiedemann, 1824
- C. panamensis (Curran, 1930)
- C. scolopus (Shannon, 1927)
