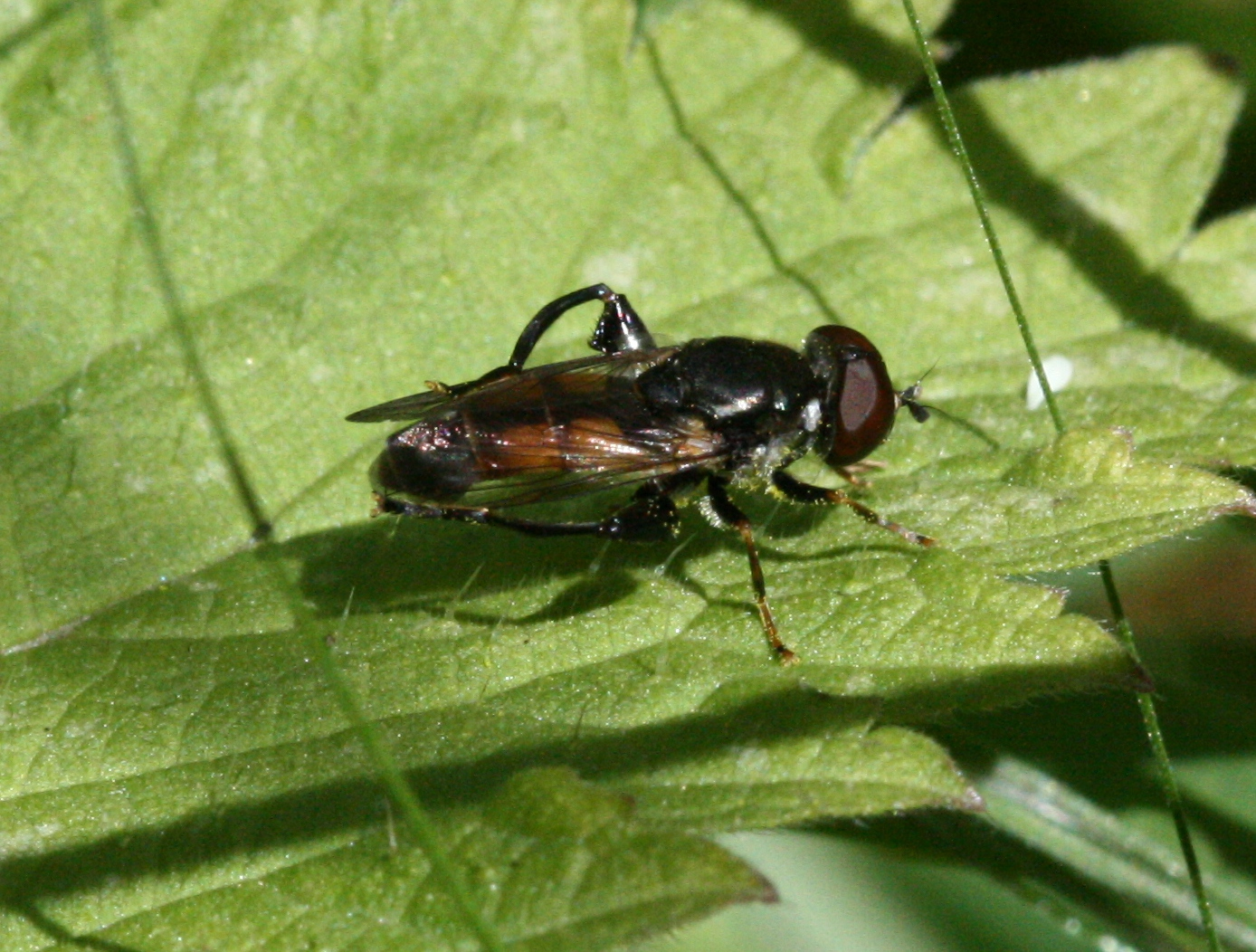
- Tropidia scita male

Scientific classification
- Kingdom: Animalia
- Phylum: Arthropoda
- Class: Insecta
- Order: Diptera
- Family: Syrphidae
- Subfamily: Eristalinae
- Tribe: Milesiini
- Genus: Tropidia; Meigen, 1822

Type species
- Eristalis milesiformis Fallén, 1817

Synonyms
- Milesiformis Rondani, 1844; Ortholophus Bigot, 1882); Rhinotropidia Stackelberg, 1930; Paratropidia Hull, 1949; Parrhyngia Shiraki, 1968

= Tropidia (fly) =

Genus of flies

Tropidia is a genus of hoverflies, from the family Syrphidae, in the order Diptera.

== Species ==
- Tropidia albistylum Macquart, 1847
- Tropidia calcarata Williston, 1887
- Tropidia coloradensis (Bigot, 1884)
- Tropidia fasciata Meigen, 1822
- Tropidia flavimana Philippi, 1865
- Tropidia flavipicta (Bigot, 1859)
- Tropidia incana Townsend, 1895
- Tropidia incerta Keiser, 1971
- Tropidia insularis Lynch Arribálzaga, 1892
- Tropidia longa (Walker, 1849)
- Tropidia mamillata Loew, 1861
- Tropidia namorana Keiser, 1971
- Tropidia montana Hunter, 1896
- Tropidia nigricornis Philippi, 1865
- Tropidia notata (Bigot, 1882)
- Tropidia pulchra Hull, 1944
- Tropidia pygmaea Shannon, 1926
- Tropidia quadrata (Say, 1824)
- Tropidia rostrata Shiraki, 1930
- Tropidia rubricornis Philippi, 1865
- Tropidia scita (Harris, 1780)
- †Tropidia tumulata (Lewis, 1973)
