= Macrozelima =

Scientific classification
- Kingdom: Animalia
- Phylum: Arthropoda
- Class: Insecta
- Order: Diptera
- Family: Syrphidae
- Subfamily: Eristalinae
- Tribe: Milesiini
- Subtribe: Tropidiina
- Genus: Macrozelima; Stackelberg, 1930

Type species
- Macrozelima bidentata Stackelberg, 1930

Genus of flies

Macrozelima is a genus of hoverfly in the family Syrphidae.

== Species ==
- Macrozelima hervei (Shiraki, 1930)
- Macrozelima scripta Hippa, 1978
