= Senogaster =

Scientific classification
- Kingdom: Animalia
- Phylum: Arthropoda
- Class: Insecta
- Order: Diptera
- Family: Syrphidae
- Subfamily: Eristalinae
- Tribe: Milesiini
- Subtribe: Tropidiina
- Genus: Senogaster; Macquart, 1834

Type species
- Senogaster coerulescens Macquart, 1834

Synonyms
- Acrochordonodes Bigot, 1878; Stenogaster Agassiz, 1846

Genus of flies

Senogaster is a genus of hoverfly in the family Syrphidae.

== Species ==
- Senogaster dentipes (Fabricius, 1787)
