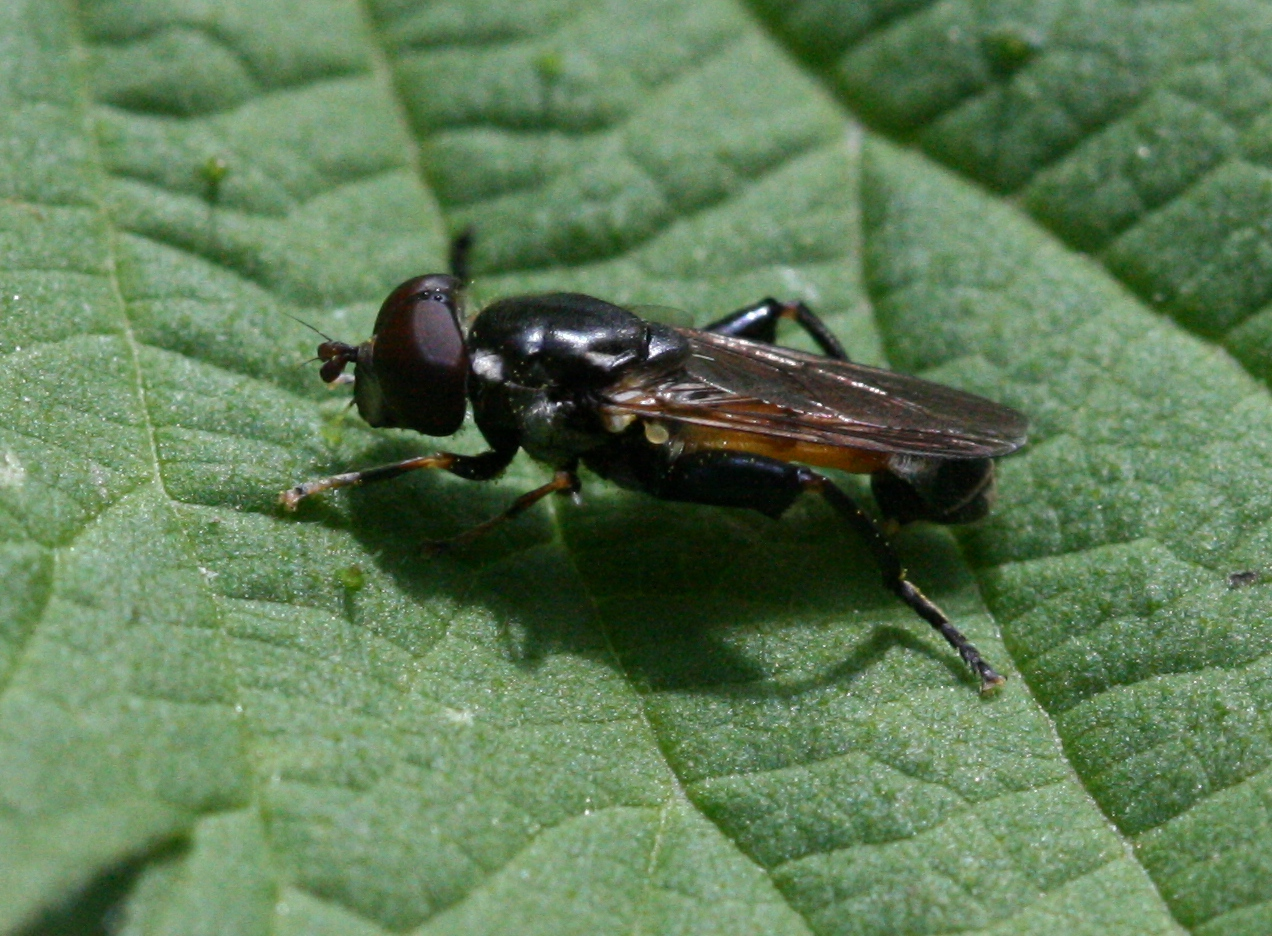

Scientific classification
- Kingdom: Animalia
- Phylum: Arthropoda
- Class: Insecta
- Order: Diptera
- Family: Syrphidae
- Subfamily: Eristalinae
- Tribe: Milesiini
- Genus: Tropidia
- Species: T. scita

Binomial name
- Tropidia scita (Harris, 1780)

Synonyms
- Musca scitus Harris, 1780; Eristalis milesiformis Fallén, 1817; Tropidia dorsalis Macquart, 1829; Tropidia rufomaculata Curtis, 1832; Milesiformis fallenii Rondani, 1845

= Tropidia scita =

Species of fly

Tropidia scita is a common Palearctic species of hoverfly associated with wetlands, ponds and ditches. The larvae have been recorded living in the basal sheaths of Typha.

== Description ==
External images For terms see Morphology of Diptera
Wing length 5.5–8.25 millimetres (0.217–0.325 in). Vein R4+5 is only slightly dipped into the underlying cell. Thorax dorsum shining black with some dusted parts. Tergites 2 and 3 yellow or orange with a black median stripe. Antennae dark, brown or black. Hind femora swollen and curved. See references for determination.

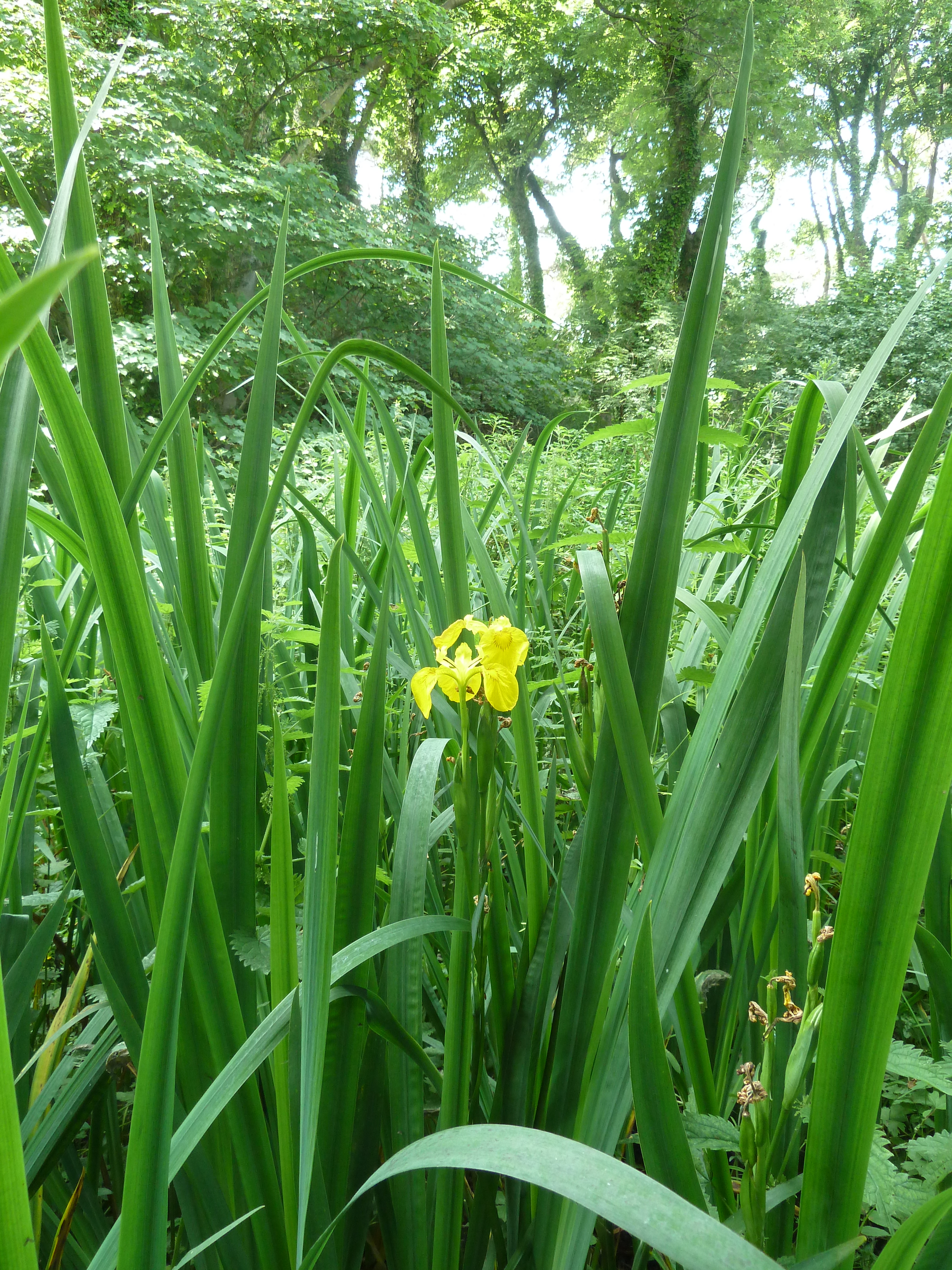
Habitat.Ireland

== Distribution ==
Palearctic Fennoscandia South to central France. Ireland East through Central Europe and then through Russia and the Caucasus. On to Siberia and the Russian Far East. Japan. Formosa.
