= Enrique Lynch Arribálzaga =

Argentine zoologist, political activist, administrator, and writer

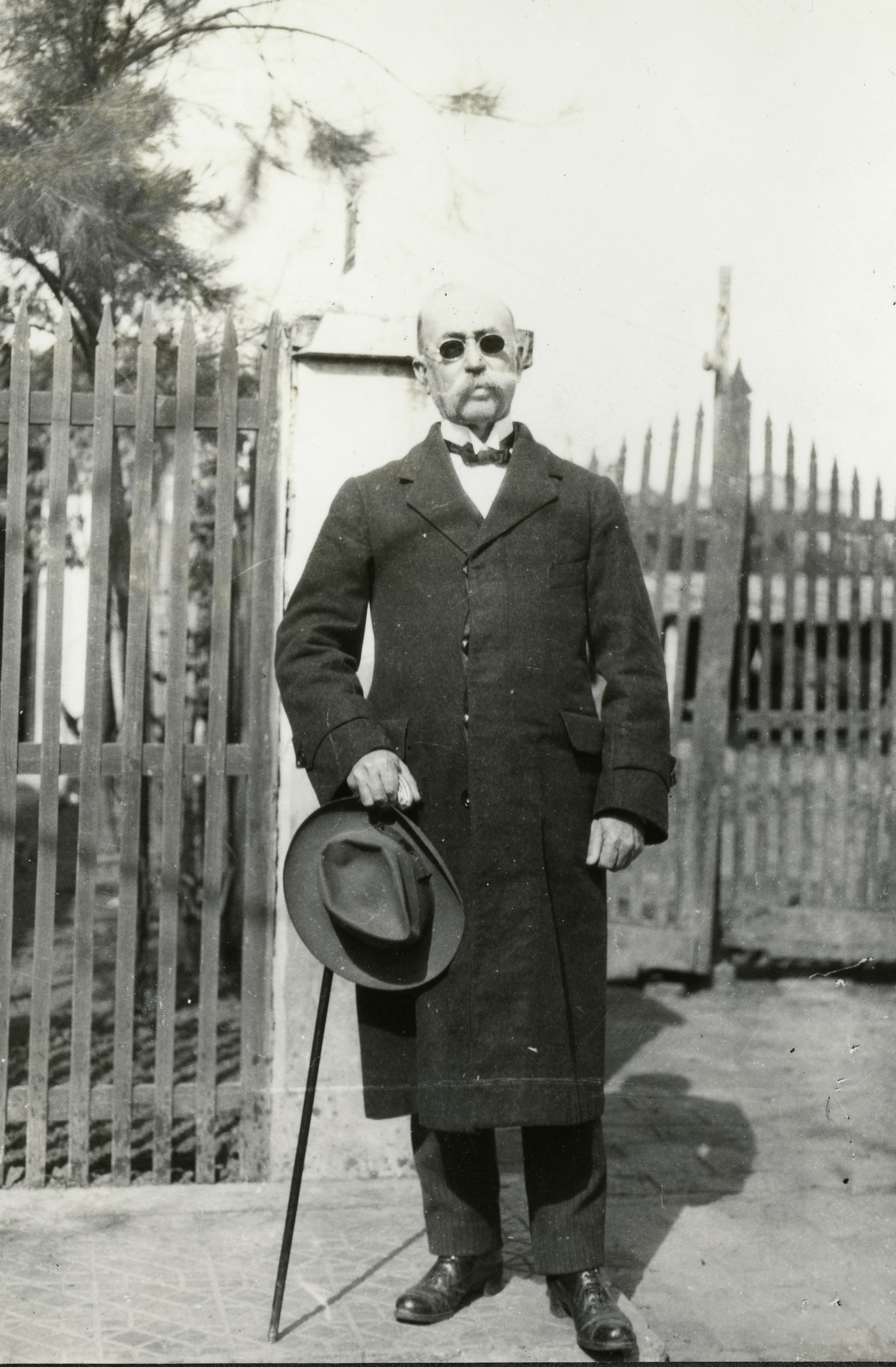
Arribálzaga in 1920

Enrique Lynch Arribálzaga (26 August 1856 – 28 June 1935) was an Argentine zoologist, political activist, administrator, and writer. Along with his brother Felix Benito Lynch (died 1894), he contributed to the knowledge of the insects of Argentina which he documented in the first Argentine journal of natural history El naturalista argentino which they founded along with Eduardo Ladislao Holmberg in 1878.

Enrique was born in a family with roots to Spanish colonialists. His father Felix F. Lynch was against the government of Juan Manuel de Rosas which led him and his wife Trinidad to live in exile in Chile. The family returned to Buenos Aires and after the birth of Enrique they moved to Baradero where they lived on a ranch. Enrique and his brother Felix read books and took an interest in the environment. He went to study in Buenos Aires but returned to the ranch after high school following the death of his father. In 1871 Enrique began to collect specimens including birds and insects. In 1876 he founded an agricultural society at Baradero. In 1881 he went on a scientific collection expedition to the Gran Chaco under Luis Jorge Fontana. He described the birds of the region.

Arribálzaga became a corresponding member of the Academy of Sciences at Cordoba and was offered a zoology position at the University of Cordoba in 1885. Between 1897 and 1902 he served as a secretary to Francisco Pascacio Moreno and helped in demarcating the boundary of Chile. He also served in the agriculture ministry and headed the entomology section of the national museum.

He wrote on the Napalpí massacre and helped organize their resettlement.

He retired to live in Resistencia Chaco where he served in various administrative positions including as Justice of Peace, Commander of the National Guard and Deputy of the Legislature.

He described many species of insects and the mosquito species Mansonia arribalzagai was named after his brother Felix Lynch.
