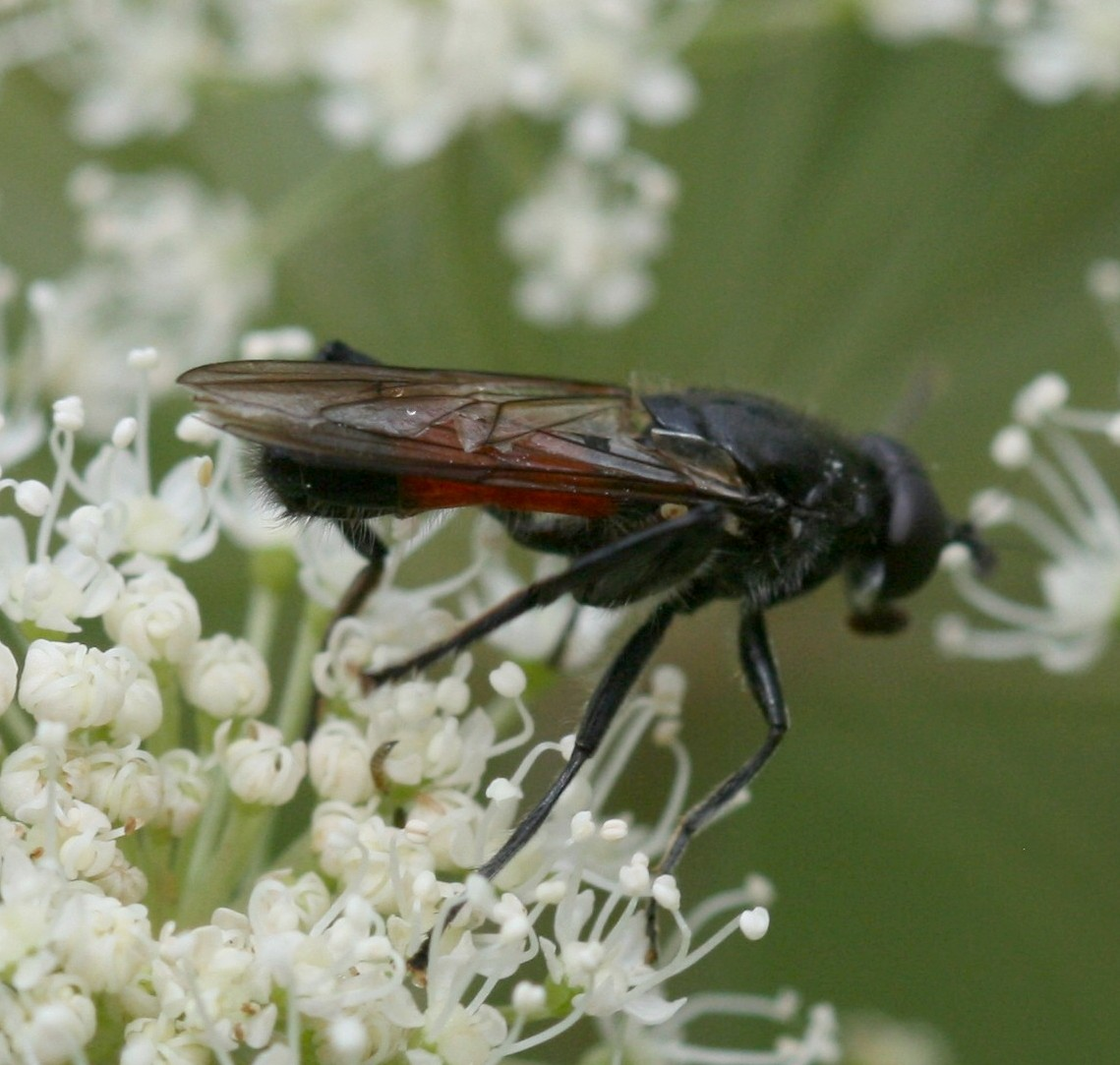
- Brachypalpoides lentus

Scientific classification
- Kingdom: Animalia
- Phylum: Arthropoda
- Class: Insecta
- Order: Diptera
- Family: Syrphidae
- Tribe: Milesiini
- Genus: Brachypalpoides; Hippa, 1978

= Brachypalpoides =

Genus of hoverflies

Brachypalpoides is a genus of hoverflies, from the family Syrphidae, in the order Diptera.

== Species ==
- B. flavifacies (Shiraki, 1930)
- B. lentus (Meigen, 1822)
- B. simplex (Shiraki, 1930)
