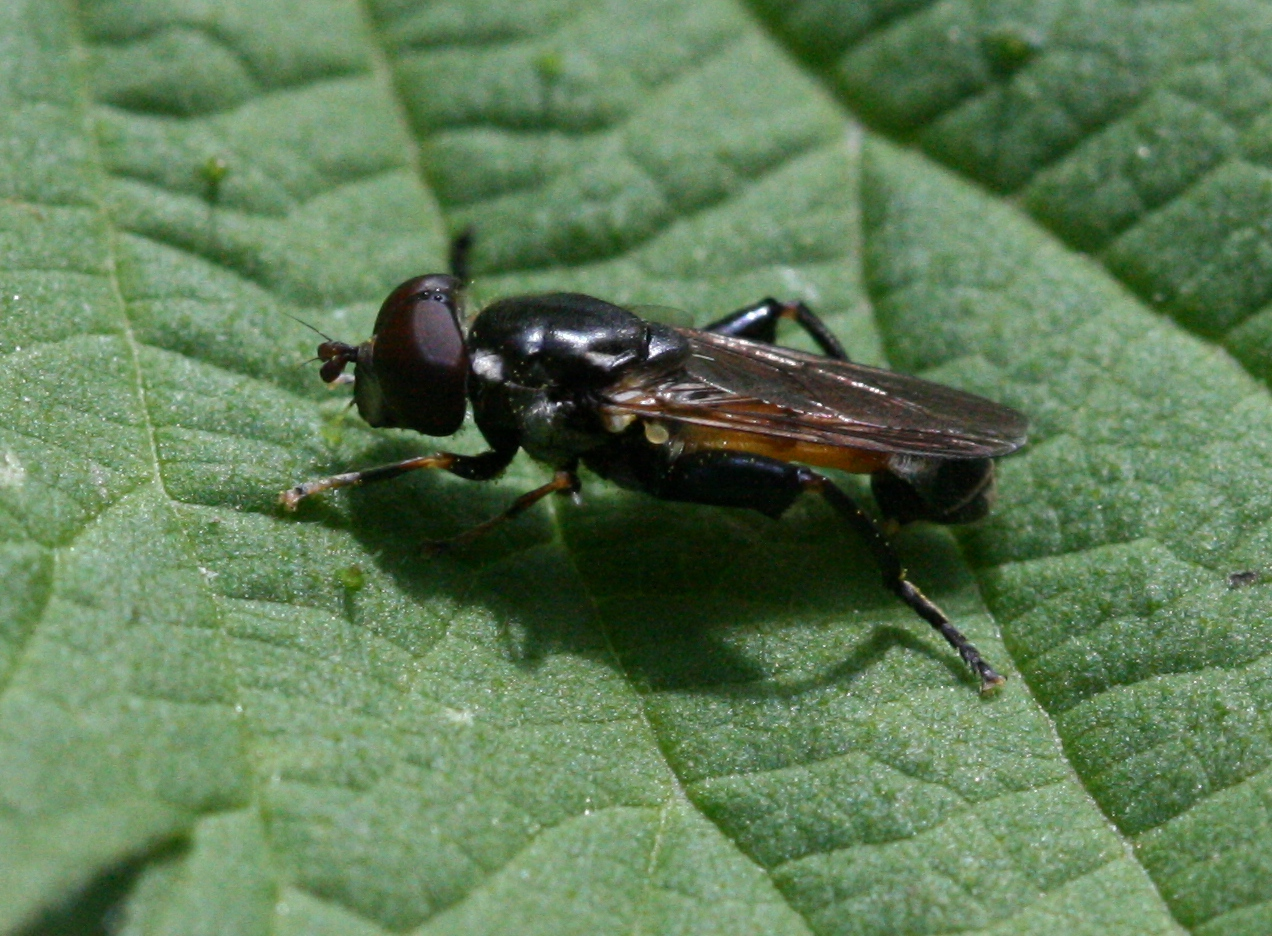
- Tropidia scita in Yorkshire, England

Scientific classification
- Kingdom: Animalia
- Phylum: Arthropoda
- Clade: Pancrustacea
- Class: Insecta
- Order: Diptera
- Family: Syrphidae
- Tribe: Milesiini
- Subtribe: Tropidiina; Hull, 1949

Type genus
- Tropidia

Genera
- Brachypalpoides; Calcaretropidia; Macrozelima; Meropidia; Nepenthosyrphus; Orthoprosopa; Paratropidia; Rhinotropidia; Senogaster; Syritta; Tropidia

= Tropidiina =

Subtribe of hoverfly

Tropidiina is a subtribe of hoverflies within the tribe Milesiini. Tropidiina includes 11 genera.

Tropidiina, although traditionally classified within the tribe Milesiini, has also been found to be a sister group to the tribe Eristalini in recent phylogenetic studies, indicating that Milesiini, as currently defined, does not include all descendants of the last common ancestor, making Milesiini polyphyletic.

== Classification ==
Tropidiina is one of eight subtribes in Milesiini, the other seven being Blerina, Criorhinina, Milesiina, Pocotina, Sericomyiina, Temnostomina and Xylotina.

== Characteristics ==
The type genus Tropidia illustrates the group's characteristic swollen hind femur. Its species are wasp-like, resembling Nomada bees, and are 9–11 mm long and black with tawny markings. The face is concave and longitudinally keeled, and the short, drooping antennae are set close together on a small protuberance in the middle of the face. The body shape narrows progressively from rear to head. The hind femur is strongly swollen and bears a large triangular plate at its tip, a trait that separates Tropidia from the related genus Xylota. The abdomen is contrastingly patterned, with tawny markings on the second and third tergites.

== Distribution ==
Tropidia and most other genera in Tropidiina are primarily found in the Americas and Europe, although there have also been sightings in Asia, Africa and Oceania. Other genera, such as Meropidia, are found exclusively in the Andes mountain range.

== Ecology and behaviour ==
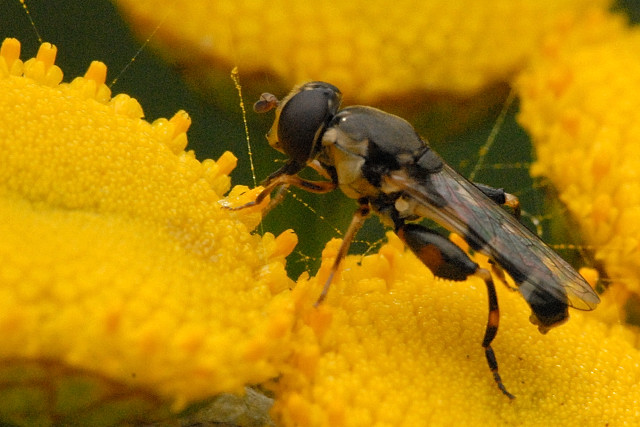
A male Syritta pipiens

=== Seasonality ===
Species in the subtribe Tropidiina are mainly active during the summer months, especially July.

Observations recorded on platforms such as iNaturalist show that sightings of species in Tropidiina have increased noticeably over the past few years. As of 2025, numbers have doubled since 2020.

=== Feeding ===
Larvae in the subtribe Tropidiina are usually saprophagous, and also contribute to pest control, as they are also aphidophagous. Adults in the subtribe Tropidiina are known to pollinate a wide range of flowers.
