= F. Christian Thompson =

American entomologist (1944–2021)

- Born: April 24, 1944; Boston
- Died: February 4, 2021; Jacksonville
- Education: University of Massachusetts Amherst
- Occupations: Entomologist, scientist, scientific collector
- Employer: Systematic Entomology Laboratory (1974–2008)
- Spouse: Betty J. Thompson

Frederic Christian Thompson (April 24, 1944 – February 4, 2021) was an American entomologist specializing in the study of Diptera. An account of his life and production was given by Evenhuis in 2021.

== Works ==
- Thompson, F. Christian (1991). "The Flower Fly genus Ornidia (Diptera:Syrphidae)" (PDF). Proceedings of the Entomological Society of Washington. 93 (2): 248–261.
- Thompson, F. Christian. (1999). "A key to the genera of the flower flies (Diptera: Syrphidae) of the Neotropical Region including descriptions of new genera and species and a glossary of taxonomic terms used" (PDF). Contributions on Entomology, International. 3 (3): 321–378

== See also ==
- Category:Taxa named by F. Christian Thompson
