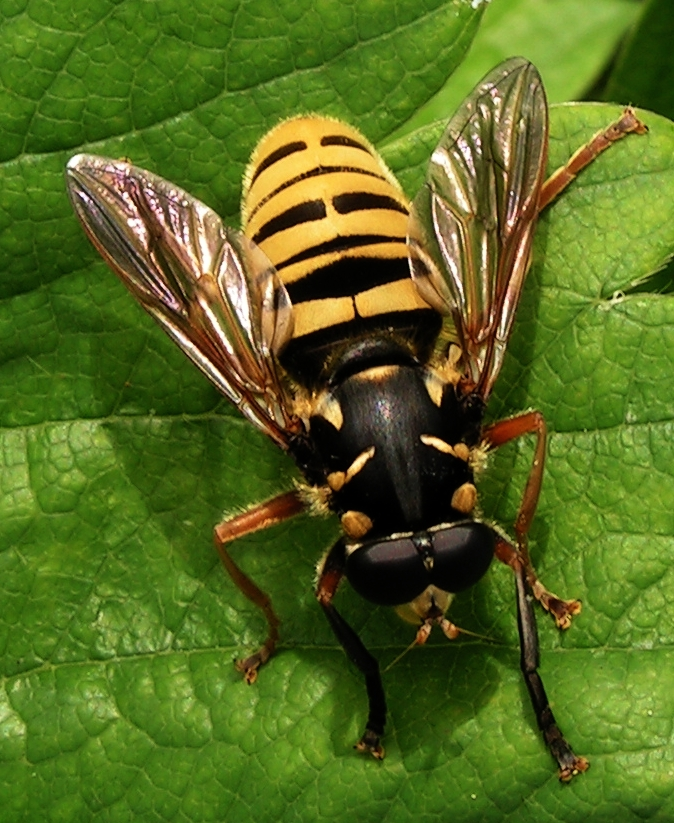
- Temnostoma vespiforme

Scientific classification
- Kingdom: Animalia
- Phylum: Arthropoda
- Clade: Pancrustacea
- Class: Insecta
- Order: Diptera
- Family: Syrphidae
- Subfamily: Eristalinae
- Tribe: Milesiini
- Subtribe: Temnostomina
- Genus: Temnostoma; Le Peletier & Serville, 1828

Type species
- Milesia bombylans Fabricius, 1805

Synonyms
- Tritonia Meigen, 1800; Microrhincus Lioy, 1864; Microrhinchus Scudder, 1882; Micrhrorhynchus Bigot, 1883; Microrrhynchus Bezzi & Stein, 1907; Microrrhynchus Kertész, 1910; Temnostomoides Krivosheina, 2005

= Temnostoma =

Genus of flies

Temnostoma is a genus of hoverflies. The larvae of some species feed on the wood of deciduous trees.

== Species ==
- Temnostoma albostriatum Huo, Ren & Zheng, 2007
- Temnostoma altaicum Krivosheina, 2004
- Temnostoma alternans Loew, 1864
- Temnostoma angustistriatum Krivosheina, 2002
- Temnostoma apiforme (Fabricius, 1794)
- Temnostoma arciforma He & Chu, 1995
- Temnostoma balyras (Walker, 1849)
- Temnostoma barberi Curran, 1939
- Temnostoma bombylans (Fabricius, 1805)
- Temnostoma daochus (Walker, 1849)
- Temnostoma excentricum Harris, 1841
- Temnostoma flavidistriatum Huo, Ren & Zheng, 2007
- Temnostoma fumosum Hull, 1944
- Temnostoma jozankeanum (Matsumura, 1916)
- Temnostoma meridionale Krivosheina & Mamayev, 1962
- Temnostoma nigrimanus Brunetti, 1915
- Temnostoma ningshanensis Huo, Ren & Zheng, 2007
- Temnostoma obscurum Loew, 1864
- Temnostoma pallidum Sack, 1910
- Temnostoma pauperius Speiser, 1924
- Temnostoma ravicauda He & Chu, 1995
- Temnostoma ruptizona Cheng, 2012
- †Temnostoma sacki Stats, 1940
- Temnostoma taiwanum Shiraki, 1930
- Temnostoma trifasciatum Robertson, 1901
- Temnostoma tuwense Krivosheina, 2004
- Temnostoma venustum Williston, 1887
- Temnostoma vespiforme (Linnaeus, 1758)
