= Matsumyia cyaniventris =

Scientific classification
- Kingdom: Animalia
- Phylum: Arthropoda
- Class: Insecta
- Order: Diptera
- Family: Syrphidae
- Subfamily: Eristalinae
- Tribe: Milesiini
- Subtribe: Criorhinina
- Genus: Matsumyia
- Species: M. cyaniventris

Binomial name
- Matsumyia cyaniventris (Sack, 1926)

Synonyms
- Penthesilea cyaniventris Sack, 1926

Species of fly

Matsumyia cyaniventris is a species of hoverfly in the family Syrphidae.

== Distribution ==
Philippines.
