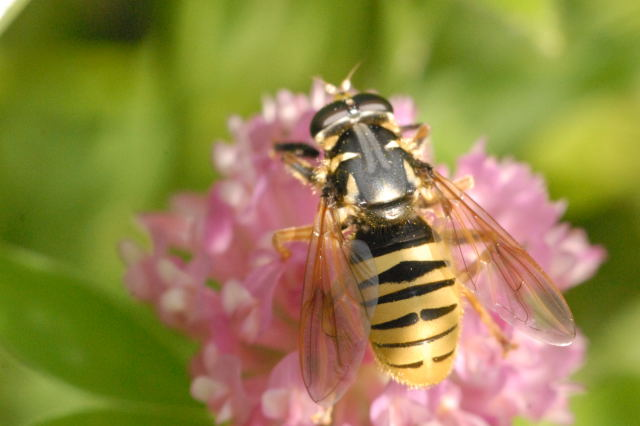

Scientific classification
- Kingdom: Animalia
- Phylum: Arthropoda
- Class: Insecta
- Order: Diptera
- Family: Syrphidae
- Subfamily: Eristalinae
- Tribe: Milesiini
- Subtribe: Temnostomina
- Genus: Temnostoma
- Species: T. vespiforme

Binomial name
- Temnostoma vespiforme (Linnaeus, 1758)

Synonyms
- Musca vespiformis Linnaeus, 1758; Temnostoma meridionale Krivosheina & Mamayev, 1962; Temnostoma strigosum Sack, 1941; Milesia wagae Górski, 1852; Musca vespaesimilis Barbut, 1781; Syrphus frequens Matsumura, 1931

= Temnostoma vespiforme =

Species of fly

Temnostoma vespiforme, the wasp hoverfly, is a species of hoverfly. Larva of this species feed in decaying wood of deciduous trees.

== Etymology ==
T. vespiforme gets its common name from its scientific name. 'vespiforme' when translated to English is 'wasplike'

== Distribution ==
Europe.
