= Matsumyia =

Scientific classification
- Kingdom: Animalia
- Phylum: Arthropoda
- Class: Insecta
- Order: Diptera
- Family: Syrphidae
- Subfamily: Eristalinae
- Tribe: Milesiini
- Subtribe: Criorhinina
- Genus: Matsumyia; Shiraki, 1949

Type species
- Priomerus jesoensis Matsumura, 1911

Genus of flies

Matsumyia is a genus of hoverfly in the family Syrphidae.

== Species ==
- Matsumyia bimaculata Huo & Ren, 2006
- Matsumyia cyaniventris (Sack, 1926)
- Matsumyia dentata (Brunetti, 1908)
- Matsumyia japonica (Shiraki, 1930)
- Matsumyia jesoensis (Matsumura, 1911)
- Matsumyia nigrofacies Shiraki, 1949
- Matsumyia setosa (Shiraki, 1930)
- Matsumyia trifasciata (Shiraki, 1930)
- Matsumyia trilineata (Hull, 1943)
- Matsumyia zibaiensis Huo & Ren, 2006
