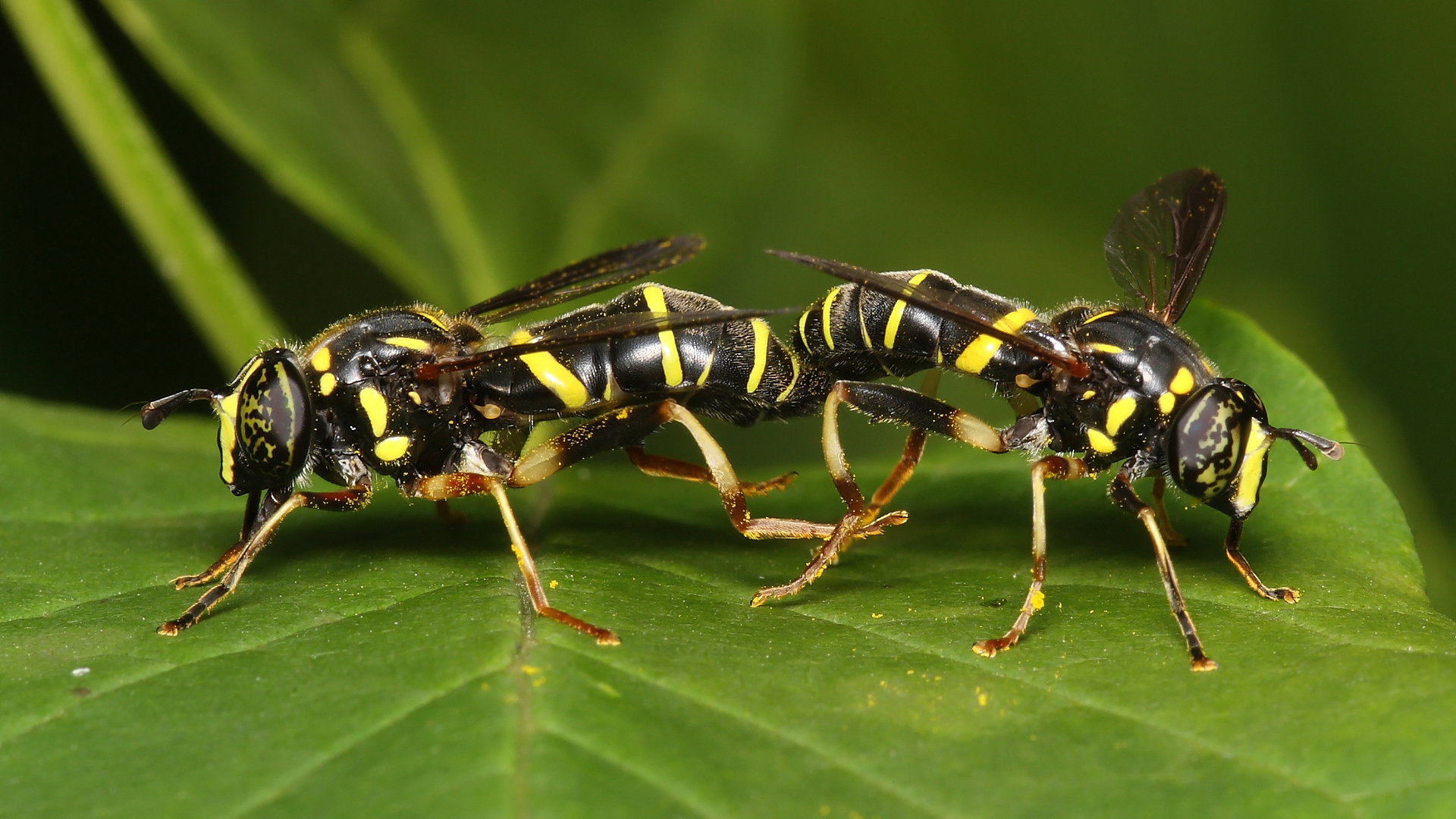
- Spilomyia sayi

Scientific classification
- Kingdom: Animalia
- Phylum: Arthropoda
- Class: Insecta
- Order: Diptera
- Family: Syrphidae
- Subfamily: Eristalinae
- Tribe: Milesiini
- Subtribe: Milesiina
- Genus: Spilomyia; Meigen, 1803

Type species
- Musca diophthalma Linnaeus, 1758

Synonyms
- Mictomyia Agassiz, 1846; Mixtemyia Macquart, 1834; Myxomyia Kertész, 1910; Myxomyia Sack, 1932; Myxtemyia Blanchard, 1845; Psilomyia Neuhaus, 1886; Spilomya Oken, 1815

= Spilomyia =

Genus of flies

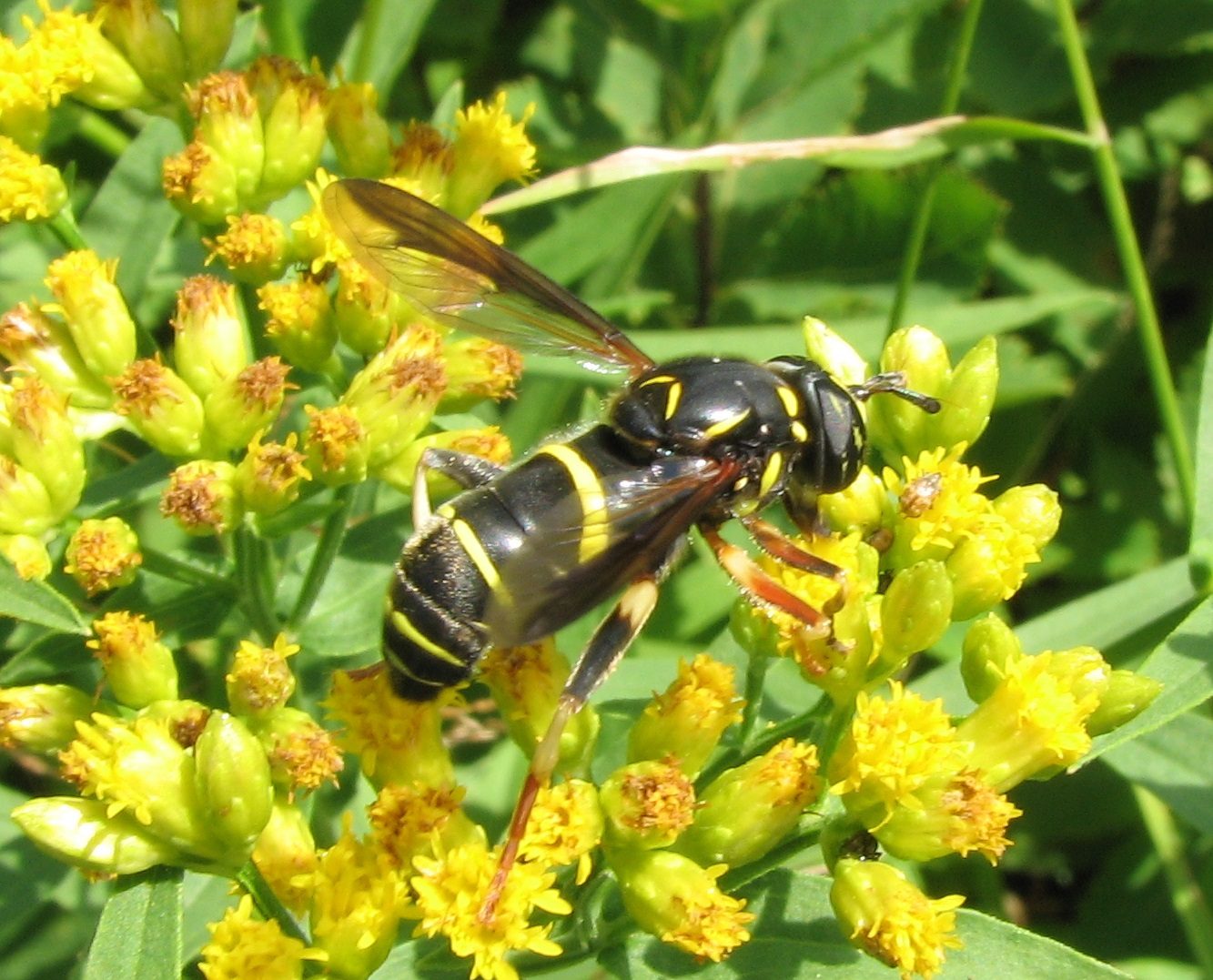
Spilomyia sayi

Spilomyia is a genus of hoverflies. Many species in the genus show Batesian mimicry of wasp models, including black and yellow patterns and modified antenna shape.

== Species ==
- Spilomyia abdominalis Shiraki, 1968
- Spilomyia alcimus (Walker, 1849)
- Spilomyia annulata Sack, 1910
- Spilomyia bidentata Huo, 2013
- Spilomyia boschmai Lucas, 1964
- Spilomyia chinensis Hull, 1950
- Spilomyia citima Vockeroth, 1958
- Spilomyia crandalli Curran, 1951
- Spilomyia curvimaculata Cheng, 2012
- Spilomyia digitata (Rondani, 1865)
- Spilomyia diophthalma (Linnaeus, 1758)
- Spilomyia ephippium (Osten Sacken, 1875)
- Spilomyia foxleei Vockeroth, 1958
- Spilomyia fusca Loew, 1864
- Spilomyia gigantea Shiraki, 1968
- Spilomyia graciosa Violovitsh, 1985
- Spilomyia gratiosa Wulp, 1888
- Spilomyia gussakovskii Stackelberg, 1958
- Spilomyia interrupta Williston, 1882
- Spilomyia kahli Snow, 1895
- Spilomyia liturata Williston, 1887
- Spilomyia longicornis Loew, 1872
- Spilomyia manicata (Rondani, 1865)
- Spilomyia maroccana Kuznetzov, 1997
- Spilomyia matsumurai Shiraki, 1968
- Spilomyia maxima Sack, 1910
- Spilomyia obscura Coquillett, 1902
- Spilomyia panfilovi Zimina, 1952
- Spilomyia permagna Stackelberg, 1958
- Spilomyia pleuralis Williston, 1887
- Spilomyia saltuum (Fabricius, 1794)
- Spilomyia sayi (Goot, 1964)
- Spilomyia scutimaculata Huo & Ren, 2006
- Spilomyia sulphurea Sack, 1910
- Spilomyia suzukii Matsumura, 1916
- Spilomyia transcaucasica Kuznetzov, 1997
- Spilomyia triangulata van Steenis, 2000
- Spilomyia turkmenorum Kuznetzov, 1997
- Spilomyia verae Kuznetzov, 1997
- Spilomyia wirthi Thompson, 1996
