= Merodon luteomaculatus =

Conservation status
- Endangered (IUCN 3.1)

Scientific classification
- Kingdom: Animalia
- Phylum: Arthropoda
- Clade: Pancrustacea
- Class: Insecta
- Order: Diptera
- Family: Syrphidae
- Genus: Merodon
- Species: M. luteomaculatus

Binomial name
- Merodon luteomaculatus (Vujić, Ačanski and Šašic, 2008)
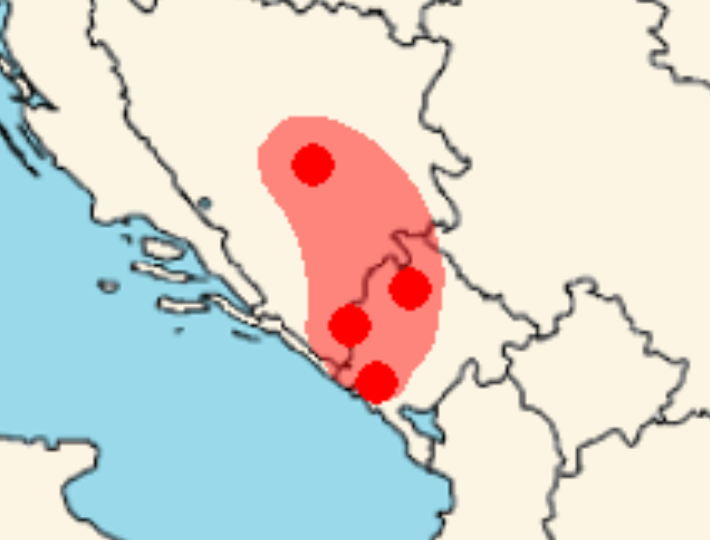
- Merodon luteomaculatus records map

Species of fly

Merodon luteomaculatus is a Holarctic species of hoverfly.

== Distribution ==
Merodon luteomaculatus is distributed on mountains in the western part of the Balkan Peninsula (Orjen and Durmitor Mountains, and near Krupac).

It is found at elevations between 300 and approximately 1,280 meters above sea level.
