= Temnostoma fumosum =

Scientific classification
- Kingdom: Animalia
- Phylum: Arthropoda
- Class: Insecta
- Order: Diptera
- Family: Syrphidae
- Subfamily: Eristalinae
- Tribe: Milesiini
- Subtribe: Temnostomina
- Genus: Temnostoma
- Species: T. fumosum

Binomial name
- Temnostoma fumosum Hull, 1944

Species of fly

Temnostoma fumosum is a species of syrphid fly in the family Syrphidae.

== Distribution ==
Japan.
