= Temnostoma nigrimanus =

Scientific classification
- Kingdom: Animalia
- Phylum: Arthropoda
- Class: Insecta
- Order: Diptera
- Family: Syrphidae
- Subfamily: Eristalinae
- Tribe: Milesiini
- Subtribe: Temnostomina
- Genus: Temnostoma
- Species: T. nigrimanus

Binomial name
- Temnostoma nigrimanus Brunetti, 1915

Synonyms
- Temnostoma nigrimana Brunetti, 1915

Species of fly

Temnostoma nigrimanus is a species of syrphid fly in the family Syrphidae.

== Distribution ==
Japan.
