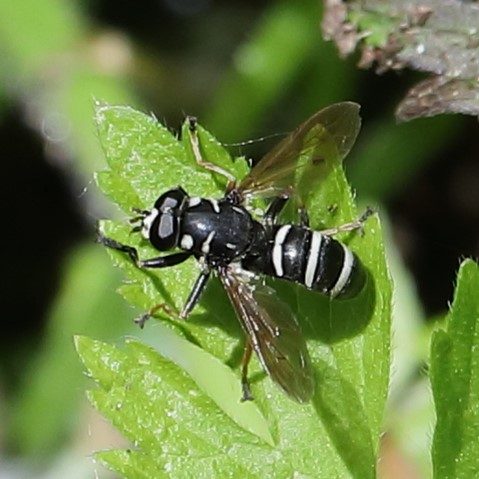

Scientific classification
- Kingdom: Animalia
- Phylum: Arthropoda
- Class: Insecta
- Order: Diptera
- Family: Syrphidae
- Subfamily: Eristalinae
- Tribe: Milesiini
- Subtribe: Temnostomina
- Genus: Temnostoma
- Species: T. obscurum

Binomial name
- Temnostoma obscurum Loew, 1864

Synonyms
- Temnostoma obscura Loew, 1864

= Temnostoma obscurum =

Species of fly

Temnostoma obscurum is a species of syrphid fly in the family Syrphidae.

== Distribution ==
Canada, United States.
