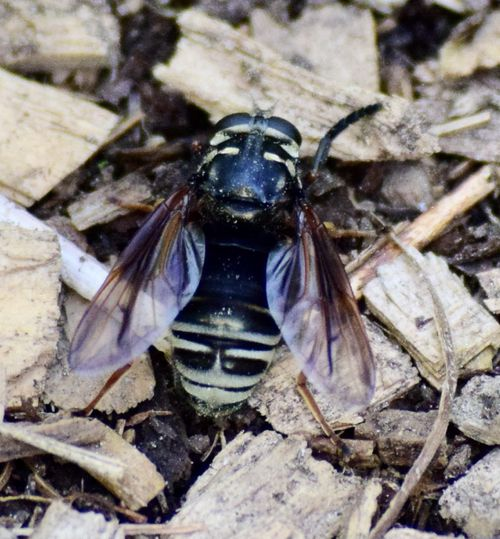

Scientific classification
- Kingdom: Animalia
- Phylum: Arthropoda
- Class: Insecta
- Order: Diptera
- Family: Syrphidae
- Tribe: Milesiini
- Subtribe: Temnostomina
- Genus: Temnostoma
- Species: T. venustum

Binomial name
- Temnostoma venustum Williston, 1887

Synonyms
- Temnostoma nipigonensis Curran, 1923

= Temnostoma venustum =

Species of fly

Temnostoma venustum, commonly known as the black-banded falsehorn, is a rare species of syrphid fly observed in the north-eastern United States and adjacent Canada. Hoverflies can remain nearly motionless in flight. The adults are also known as flower flies since they are commonly found on flowers, from which they get both energy-giving nectar and protein rich pollen. Adults of the genus Temnostoma are strong wasp mimics. The larvae burrow in moist decayed wood.

== Distribution ==
Canada, United States.
