= Temnostoma ningshanensis =

Scientific classification
- Kingdom: Animalia
- Phylum: Arthropoda
- Class: Insecta
- Order: Diptera
- Family: Syrphidae
- Subfamily: Eristalinae
- Tribe: Milesiini
- Subtribe: Temnostomina
- Genus: Temnostoma
- Species: T. ningshanensis

Binomial name
- Temnostoma ningshanensis Huo, Ren & Zheng, 2007

Species of fly

Temnostoma ningshanensis is a species of syrphid fly in the family Syrphidae.

== Distribution ==
China.
