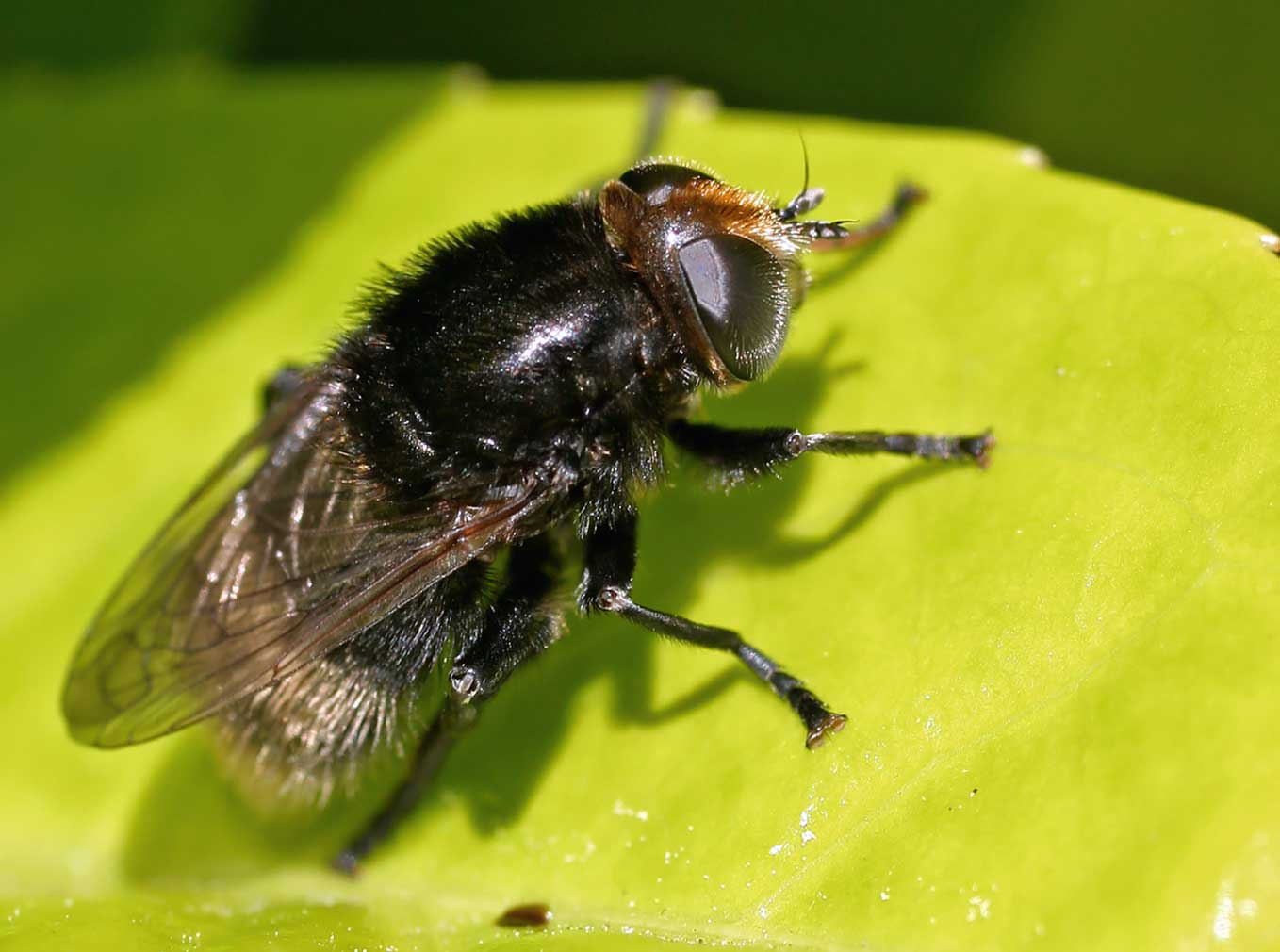
- Merodon equestris the Narcissus bulb fly

Scientific classification
- Kingdom: Animalia
- Phylum: Arthropoda
- Clade: Pancrustacea
- Class: Insecta
- Order: Diptera
- Family: Syrphidae
- Subfamily: Eristalinae
- Tribe: Merodontini
- Genus: Merodon; Meigen, 1803

Synonyms
- Lampetia Meigen, 1800; Penthesilia Swinderen, 1822

= Merodon =

Genus of flies

Merodon is a large genus of bee-like hoverflies. The majority of the species are centered on the Mediterranean and it is the second largest hoverfly genus in Europe with more than 50 European species. It is distributed over the Palaearctic and Afrotropical realms, with most European species occurring in Southern and Eastern Europe. The centre of distribution of this genus appears to be Turkey, where about 65 species have been recorded. Some species occur in Africa (Morocco through East Africa and Ghana to South Africa) and the middle East, as far as Pakistan. Given the rate at which new species have been recorded over the past decades, the worldwide number of species could exceed 200. The larvae feed on the bulbs or rhizomes of monocotyledons.

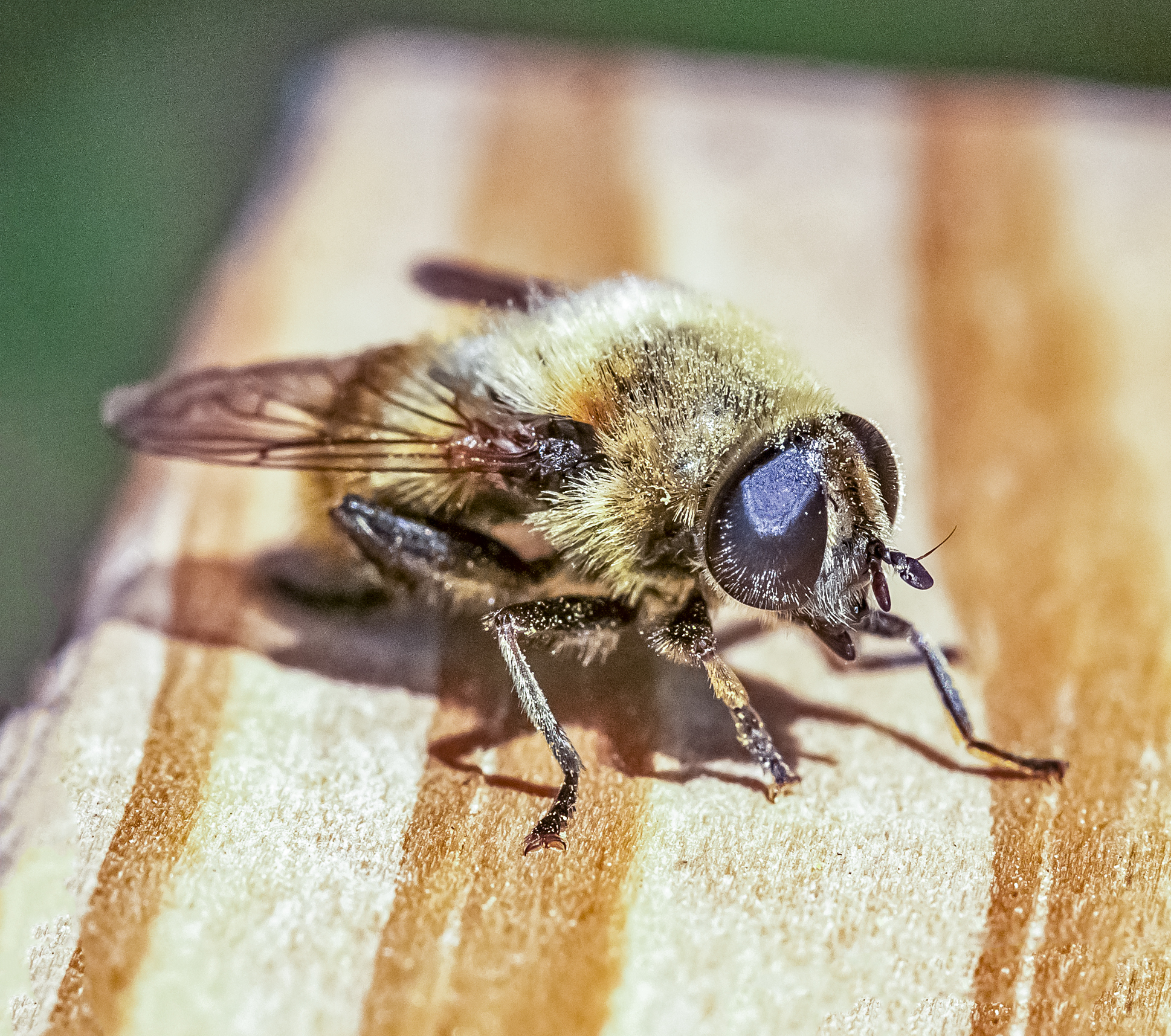
Merodon sp.

One of the more common species in the genus, Merodon equestris is known as the Narcissus bulb fly, greater bulb-fly, large bulb fly or large Narcissus fly.

== Systematics ==
Species include:

- M. aberrans Egger, 1860
- M. abruzzensis van der Goot, 1969
- M. adriaticus Veselić, Vujić & Radenković, 2017
- M. aerarius Rondani, 1857
- M. analis Meigen, 1822
- M. aureus Meigen, 1822
- M. affinis Gil Collado, 1930
- M. alagoezicus Paramonov, 1925
- M. albifrons Meigen, 1822
- M. albifasciatus Macquart, 1842
- M. albonigrum Vujic, Radenkovic & Simic, 1996
- M. alexandri Popov, 2010
- M. alexeji Paramonov, 1925
- M. ambiguus Bradescu, 1986
- M. andalusiacus Paramonov, 1929
- M. andriotes Vujić, Radenković & Šašic, 2018
- M. annulatus (Fabricius, 1794)
- M. antonioi Marcos-García, Vujic & Mengual, 2007
- M. armipes Rondani, 1843
- M. arundanus Marcos-García, Vujic & Mengual, 2007
- M. atratus (Oldenberg, 1919)
- M. atricapillatus Šašić, Ačanski & Vujić, 2018
- M. aureus Fabricius, 1805
- M. auripes Sack, 1913
- M. auripilus Meigen, 1830
- M. avidus (Rossi, 1790)
- M. balkanicus Šašić, Ačanski & Vujić, 2016
- M. bessarabicus Paramonov, 1924
- M. biarcuatus Curran, 1939
- M. bolivari Gil Collado, 1930
- M. cabanerensis Marcos-García, Vujic & Mengual, 2007
- M. caerulescens Loew, 1869
- M. calidus Vujić, Ačanski & Šašić, 2020
- M. caucasicus Portschinsky, 1877
- M. chalybeatus Sack, 1913
- M. chalybeus Wiedemann in Meigen, 1822
- M. cinereus (Fabricius, 1794)
- M. clavipes (Fabricius, 1781)
- M. clunipes Sack, 1913
- M. confinium Šašić & Vujić, 2020
- M. confusus Marcos-García, Vujić, Ricarte & Ståhls, 2011
- M. constans (Rossi, 1794)
- M. crassifemoris Paramonov, 1925
- M. crymensis Paramonov, 1925
- M. crypticus Marcos-García, Vujic & Mengual, 2007
- M. desuturinus Vujic, Simic & Radenkovic, 1995
- M. distinctus Palma, 1863
- M. dobrogensis Bradescu, 1982
- M. dzhalitae Paramonov, 1926
- M. elegans Hurkmans, 1993
- M. equestris (Fabricius, 1794)
- M. eques (Fabricius, 1805)
- M. erivanicus Paramonov, 1925
- M. erymanthius Vujić, Ačanski and Šašić, 2018
- M. escalerai Gil Collado, 1929
- M. escorialensis Strobl, 1909
- M. euri Vujić & Radenković, 2018
- M. femoratoides Paramonov, 1925
- M. femoratus Sack, 1913
- M. flavus Sack, 1913
- M. flavicornis Macquart, 1842
- M. fractipes Paramonov, 1936
- M. funestus (Fabricius, 1794)
- M. gallicus (Vujíc & Radenković, 2012)
- M. geniculatus Strobl, 1909
- M. haemorrhoidalis Sack, 1913 syn. of M. analis
- M. hamifer Sack, 1913
- M. hispanicus Sack, 1931
- M. hoplitis Hurkmans, 2012
- M. hurkmansi Marcos-García, Vujic & Mengual, 2007
- M. kaloceros Hurkmans, 1993
- M. karadaghensis Zimina, 1989
- M. kiritschenkoi (Stackelberg, 1960)
- M. kozufensis Radenković & Vujić, 2020
- M. legionensis Marcos-García, Vujic & Mengual, 2007
- M. loewi van der Goot, 1964
- M. longicornis Sack, 1913
- M. longispinus Marcos-García, Vujic & Mengual, 2007
- M. lusitanicus Hurkmans, 1993
- M. luteihumerus Marcos-García, Vujic & Mengual, 2007
- M. luteomaculatus Vujić, Ačanski and Šašic, 2018
- M. manicatus Sack, 1938
- M. mariae Hurkmans, 1993
- M. medium Vujić, Likov & Radenković, 2020
- M. megavidus Vujić & Radenković, 2016
- M. minutus Strobl, 1893
- M. nanus Sack, 1931
- M. natans (Fabricius, 1794)
- M. naxius Vujić & Šašić, 2018
- M. nigritarsis Rondani, 1845
- M. nisi Veselić, Vujić & Radenković, 2017
- M. nitens Hurkmans & Vujić, 2020
- M. olympius Vujić & Radenković, 2020
- M. orjensis Radenković & Vujić, 2020
- M. parietum Wiedemann in Meigen, 1822
- M. peloponnesius Vujić, Radenković, Ačanski and Šašic, 2018
- M. planiceps Loew, 1862
- M. pruni (Rossi, 1790)
- M. quercetorum Marcos-García, Vujic & Mengual, 2007
- M. rojoi Vujić & Radenković, 2020
- M. rubidiventris Costa, 1884
- M. ruficornis Meigen, 1822
- M. rufipes Sack, 1913
- M. rufus Meigen, 1838
- M. sacki (Paramonov, 1936)
- M. segetum (Fabricius, 1794)
- M. spicatus Becker, 1907
- M. spineus Vujić, Šašić & Likov, 2020
- M. spinitarsis Paramonov, 1929
- M. splendens Hurkmans, 1993
- M. strobli Bradescu, 1986
- M. stukei Hauser & Hurkmans, 1997
- M. tener Sack, 1913
- M. teruelensis van der Goot, 1966
- M. testaceoides Hurkmans, 1993
- M. toscanus Hurkmans, 1993
- M. triangulum Vujić, Radenković & Hurkmans, 2020
- M. tricinctus Sack, 1913
- M. trochantericus Costa, 1884
- M. unguicornis Strobl, 1909
- M. velox Loew, 1869
- M. virgatus Vujić & Radenković, 2016
- M. vladimiri Vujić, 2018
