= Merodon orjensis =

Conservation status
- Critically Endangered (IUCN 3.1)

Scientific classification
- Kingdom: Animalia
- Phylum: Arthropoda
- Clade: Pancrustacea
- Class: Insecta
- Order: Diptera
- Family: Syrphidae
- Genus: Merodon
- Species: M. orjensis

Binomial name
- Merodon orjensis Radenković & Vujić, 2020

Species of fly

Merodon orjensis is a Holarctic species of hoverfly. It is found in Montenegro.

== Distribution ==
This species is endemic to Montenegro, where it is known from a single locality, Mt. Orjen.
