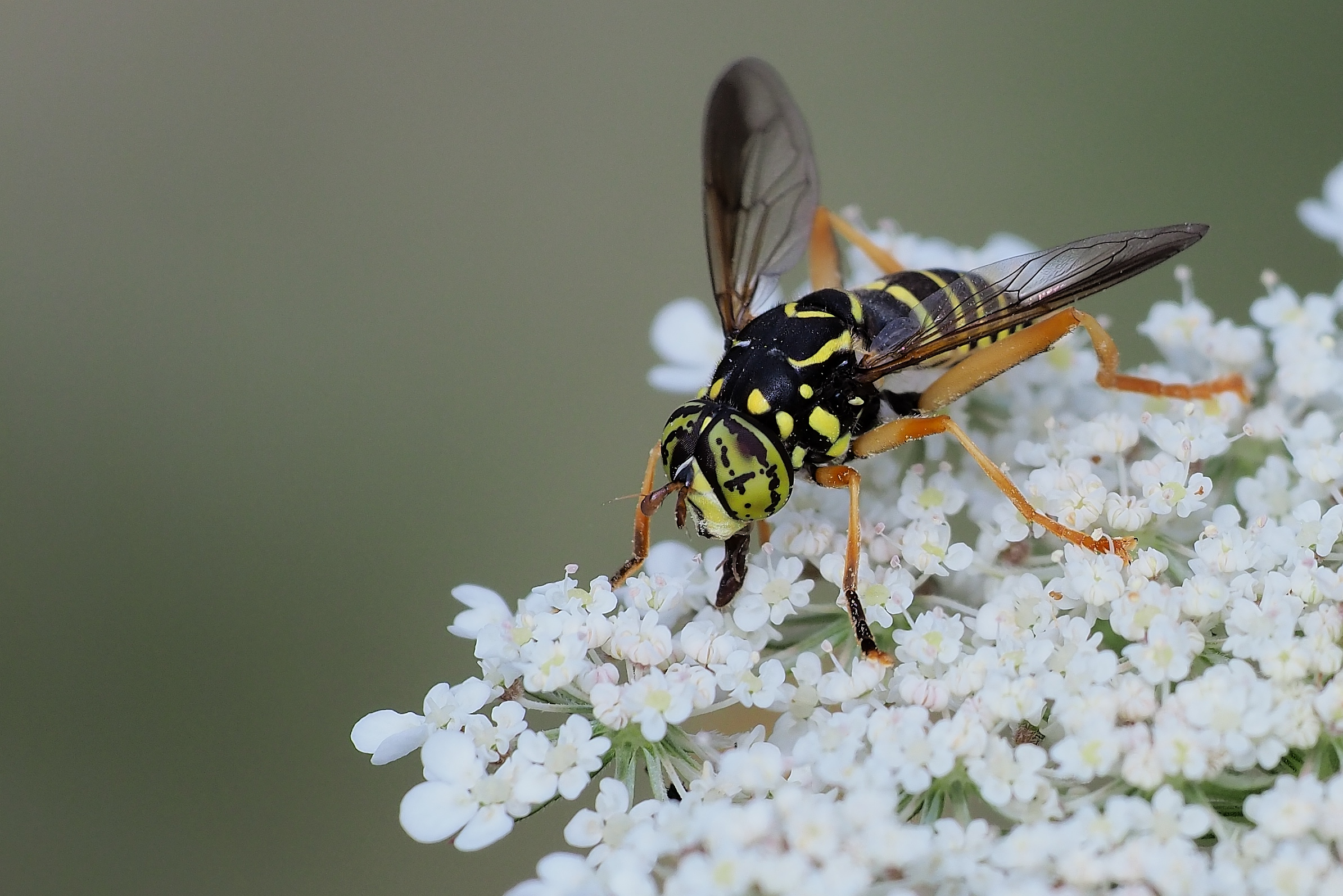

Scientific classification
- Kingdom: Animalia
- Phylum: Arthropoda
- Class: Insecta
- Order: Diptera
- Family: Syrphidae
- Subfamily: Eristalinae
- Tribe: Milesiini
- Subtribe: Milesiina
- Genus: Spilomyia
- Species: S. saltuum

Binomial name
- Spilomyia saltuum (Fabricius, 1794)

Synonyms
- Syrphus saltuum Fabricius, 1794

= Spilomyia saltuum =

Species of fly

Spilomyia saltuum is a species of Hoverfly in the family Syrphidae.

== Distribution ==
Italy.
