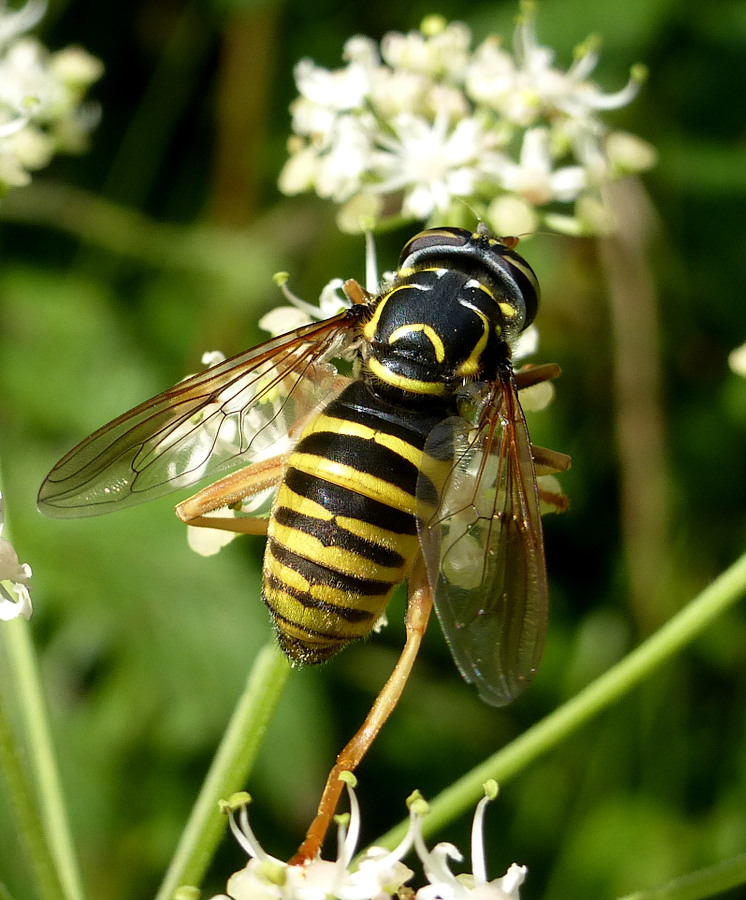

Scientific classification
- Kingdom: Animalia
- Phylum: Arthropoda
- Class: Insecta
- Order: Diptera
- Family: Syrphidae
- Subfamily: Eristalinae
- Tribe: Milesiini
- Subtribe: Milesiina
- Genus: Spilomyia
- Species: S. manicata

Binomial name
- Spilomyia manicata (Rondani, 1865)

Synonyms
- Milesia manicata Rondani, 1865; Spilomyia hybrida Šuster & Zilberman, 1958; Spilomyia hybrida var. intermedia Šuster & Zilberman, 1958; Spilomyia integra Kuntze, 1913

= Spilomyia manicata =

Species of fly

Spilomyia manicata is a species of Hoverfly in the family Syrphidae.

== Distribution ==
Europe.
