= Matsumyia zibaiensis =

Scientific classification
- Kingdom: Animalia
- Phylum: Arthropoda
- Class: Insecta
- Order: Diptera
- Family: Syrphidae
- Subfamily: Eristalinae
- Tribe: Milesiini
- Subtribe: Criorhinina
- Genus: Matsumyia
- Species: M. zibaiensis

Binomial name
- Matsumyia zibaiensis Huo & Ren, 2006

Species of fly

Matsumyia is a species of hoverfly in the family Syrphidae.

== Distribution ==
China.
