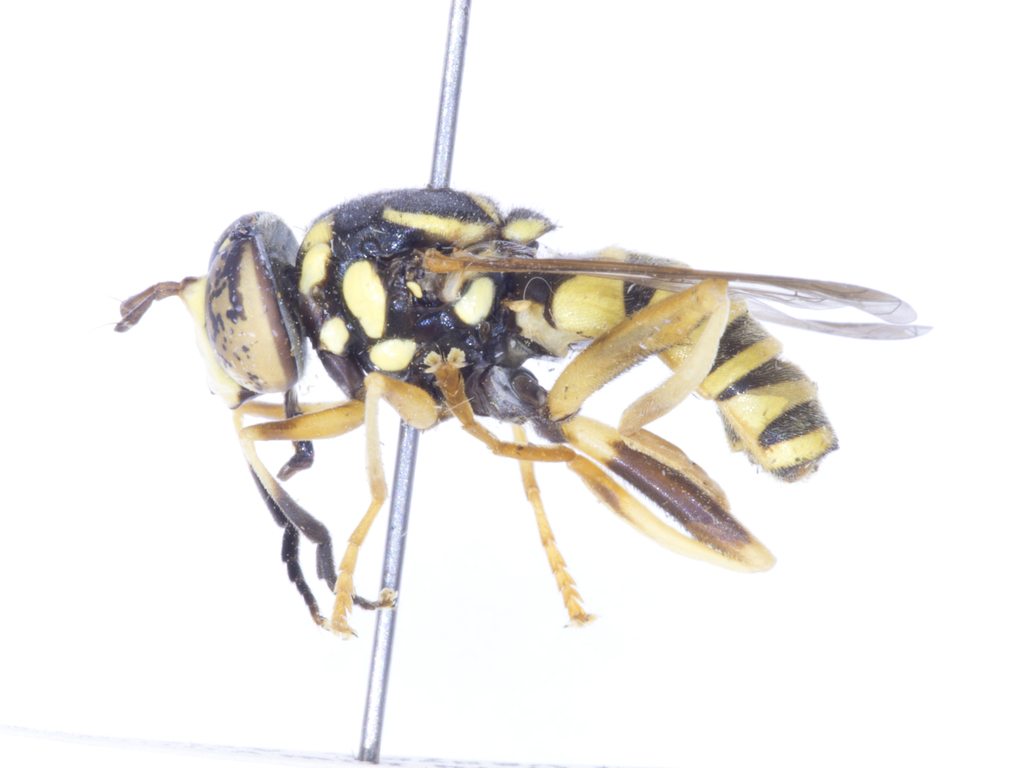
- pinned specimen

Scientific classification
- Kingdom: Animalia
- Phylum: Arthropoda
- Class: Insecta
- Order: Diptera
- Family: Syrphidae
- Subfamily: Eristalinae
- Tribe: Milesiini
- Subtribe: Milesiina
- Genus: Spilomyia
- Species: S. liturata

Binomial name
- Spilomyia liturata Williston, 1887

= Spilomyia liturata =

Species of fly

Spilomyia liturata (Williston, 1882), the Rocky Mountain Hornet Fly, is an uncommon species of syrphid fly. This species is found in western North America along the Rocky Mountains. Hoverflies get their names from the ability to remain nearly motionless while in flight. The adults are also known as flower flies for they are commonly found around and on flowers, from which they get both energy-giving nectar and protein-rich pollen. The larvae are known as the short-tailed larvae, suited for moist areas such as rot holes of trees.

== Distribution ==
United States.
