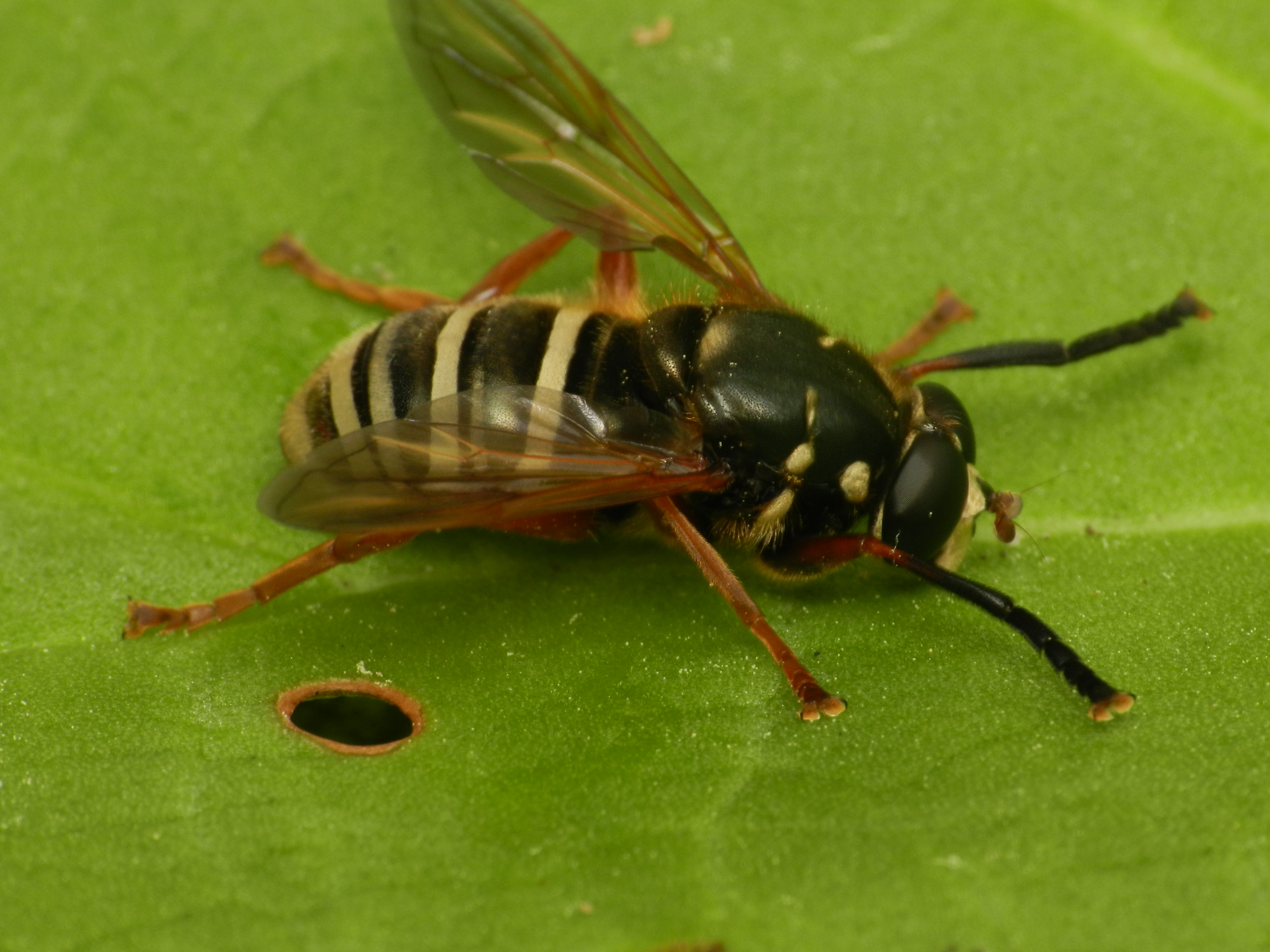

Scientific classification
- Kingdom: Animalia
- Phylum: Arthropoda
- Class: Insecta
- Order: Diptera
- Family: Syrphidae
- Tribe: Milesiini
- Subtribe: Temnostomina
- Genus: Temnostoma
- Species: T. apiforme

Binomial name
- Temnostoma apiforme (Fabricius, 1794)

Synonyms
- Syrphus apiforme Fabricius, 1794; Temnostoma apiforme var. carens Gaunitz, 1936

= Temnostoma apiforme =

Species of fly

Temnostoma apiforme is a species of hoverfly. Larva of this species feed in decaying wood of deciduous trees.
