= Spilomyia gigantea =

Scientific classification
- Kingdom: Animalia
- Phylum: Arthropoda
- Class: Insecta
- Order: Diptera
- Family: Syrphidae
- Subfamily: Eristalinae
- Tribe: Milesiini
- Subtribe: Milesiina
- Genus: Spilomyia
- Species: S. gigantea

Binomial name
- Spilomyia gigantea Shiraki, 1968

Species of fly

Spilomyia gigantea is a species of hover fly in the family Syrphidae.

== Distribution ==
Japan.
