= Spilomyia wirthi =

Scientific classification
- Kingdom: Animalia
- Phylum: Arthropoda
- Class: Insecta
- Order: Diptera
- Family: Syrphidae
- Subfamily: Eristalinae
- Tribe: Milesiini
- Subtribe: Milesiina
- Genus: Spilomyia
- Species: S. wirthi

Binomial name
- Spilomyia wirthi Thompson, 1996

Species of fly

Spilomyia wirthi is a species of syrphid fly in the family Syrphidae.

== Distribution ==
Costa Rica.
