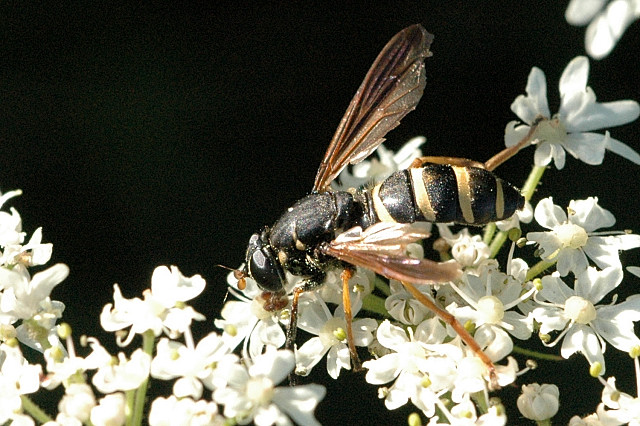
- Temnostoma bombylans

Scientific classification
- Kingdom: Animalia
- Phylum: Arthropoda
- Class: Insecta
- Order: Diptera
- Family: Syrphidae
- Tribe: Milesiini
- Subtribe: Temnostomina
- Genus: Temnostoma
- Species: T. bombylans

Binomial name
- Temnostoma bombylans (Fabricius, 1805)

Synonyms
- Milesia bombylans (Fabricius, 1805); Milesia zetterstedtii Fallén, 1816; Temnostoma nitobei Matsumura, 1916; Temnostoma japonicum Hull, 1944; Temnostoma takahasii Violovich, 1976

= Temnostoma bombylans =

Species of fly

Temnostoma bombylans is a species of hoverfly. Larva of this species feed in decaying wood of deciduous trees.
