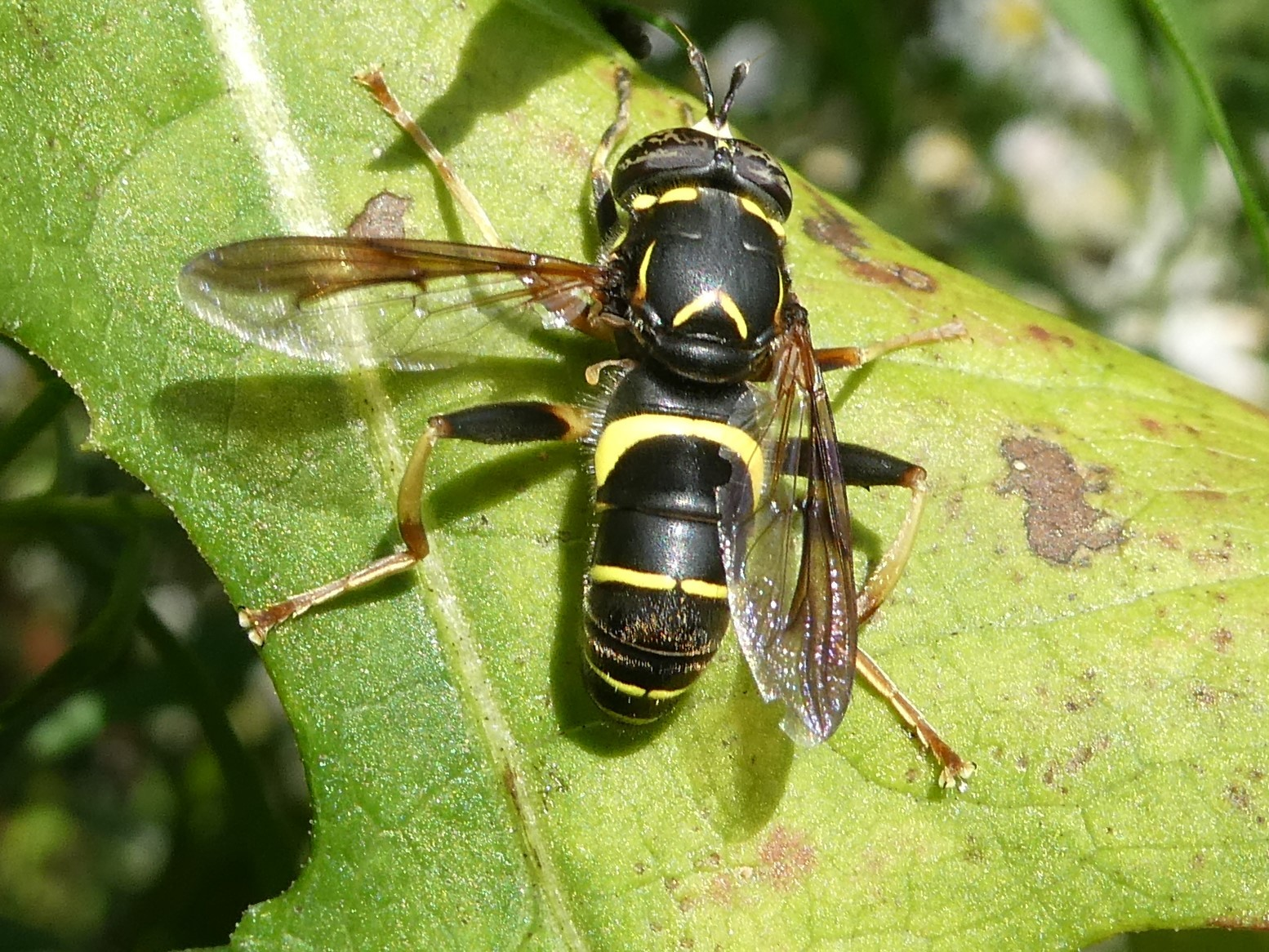

Scientific classification
- Kingdom: Animalia
- Phylum: Arthropoda
- Clade: Pancrustacea
- Class: Insecta
- Order: Diptera
- Family: Syrphidae
- Subfamily: Eristalinae
- Tribe: Milesiini
- Subtribe: Milesiina
- Genus: Spilomyia
- Species: S. sayi

Binomial name
- Spilomyia sayi (Goot, 1964)

Synonyms
- Paragus quadrifasciatus Say, 1824; Paragus sayi Goot, 1964

= Spilomyia sayi =

Species of fly

Spilomyia sayi (Goot, 1964), the Four-lined Hornet Fly, is a fairly common species of syrphid fly. This species is found from western Canada to northeastern North America. Hoverflies get their names from the ability to remain nearly motionless while in flight. The adults are also known as flower flies for they are commonly found around and on flowers, from which they get both energy-giving nectar and protein-rich pollen. The larvae are known as the short-tailed larvae, suited for moist areas such as rot holes of trees. It is a wasp mimic.

Spilomyia sayi on a flower

Adults are seen from June to October in the northern part of their range. Males engage in hilltopping, where they find high ground to await females. Larvae are found in decaying heartwood of deciduous trees.

== Description ==
For terms see Morphology of Diptera.

Size

10–16 mm (0.4–0.6 in)

Head

The vertex is black against a black background. In the female the antennal prominece is yellow The face profile is nearly straight, yellow with a wide median black stripe. The antennae are elongate as long as the face is deep. The yellow arista is bare. The antennae are reddish brown to brownish black. The flagellum is moderately elongated. The pedicle is very elongate, nearly twice as long as the scape. The flagellum is trapezoidal and a half longer than wide. The eyes are bare with clear brown color pattern in living specimens The male eyes are holoptic.

Thorax

The black scutum has a prominent, inverted V-shaped yellow structure just above the posterior margin. There is a small yellow spot on the humeri and a larger one to the inner side. There is a slender line above the wings. The scutellum is black with very narrow yellow rim. The pleurae are black with distinct yellow markings. There is a large elongate yellow spot on the meso-pleurae, a large rounded one on the sternopleura, and a smaller one, sometimes obsolete, above the front coxae.

Wings

Wings elongate, brownish along the front border, hyaline behind. Wing with cell R_{_{4+5}} acute and slightly petiolate; cell r_{1} open. The crossvein r-m is strongly oblique.

Legs

The base of front tibia are yellow, the remainder black. The front tarsi are black. The front and mid femur are strongly swollen. The base of mid femur is yellow, with the remainder brown. The base of the hind femur has a smaller yellow area at the base with the rest mostly black. The hind femur has an anteriolateral spur. The mid and hind tibia are light ochraceous. The mid and hind tarsi are pale brownish yellow.

Abdomen

This species has a black, elongate cylindrical abdomen, scarcely wider than the thorax and with four yellow bands.
Abdominal segment one is entirely black. The second segment has a single conspicuous anterior yellow band strongly arcuate, with the convexity towards the front and continuing backward onto the third segment. On the third segments there is a single median yellow band narrowly interrupted in the middle. Segment four also with a median yellow interrupted band and also a band along the posterior edge of the segment. On the posterior angles of the second and third segments there is a small yellow streak, extending a short distance narrowly inward.

== Distribution ==
Canada, United States.
