= Spilomyia transcaucasica =

Scientific classification
- Kingdom: Animalia
- Phylum: Arthropoda
- Class: Insecta
- Order: Diptera
- Family: Syrphidae
- Subfamily: Eristalinae
- Tribe: Milesiini
- Subtribe: Milesiina
- Genus: Spilomyia
- Species: S. transcaucasica

Binomial name
- Spilomyia transcaucasica Kuznetzov, 1997

Species of fly

Spilomyia transcaucasica is a species of Hoverfly in the family Syrphidae.

== Distribution ==
Azerbaijan.
