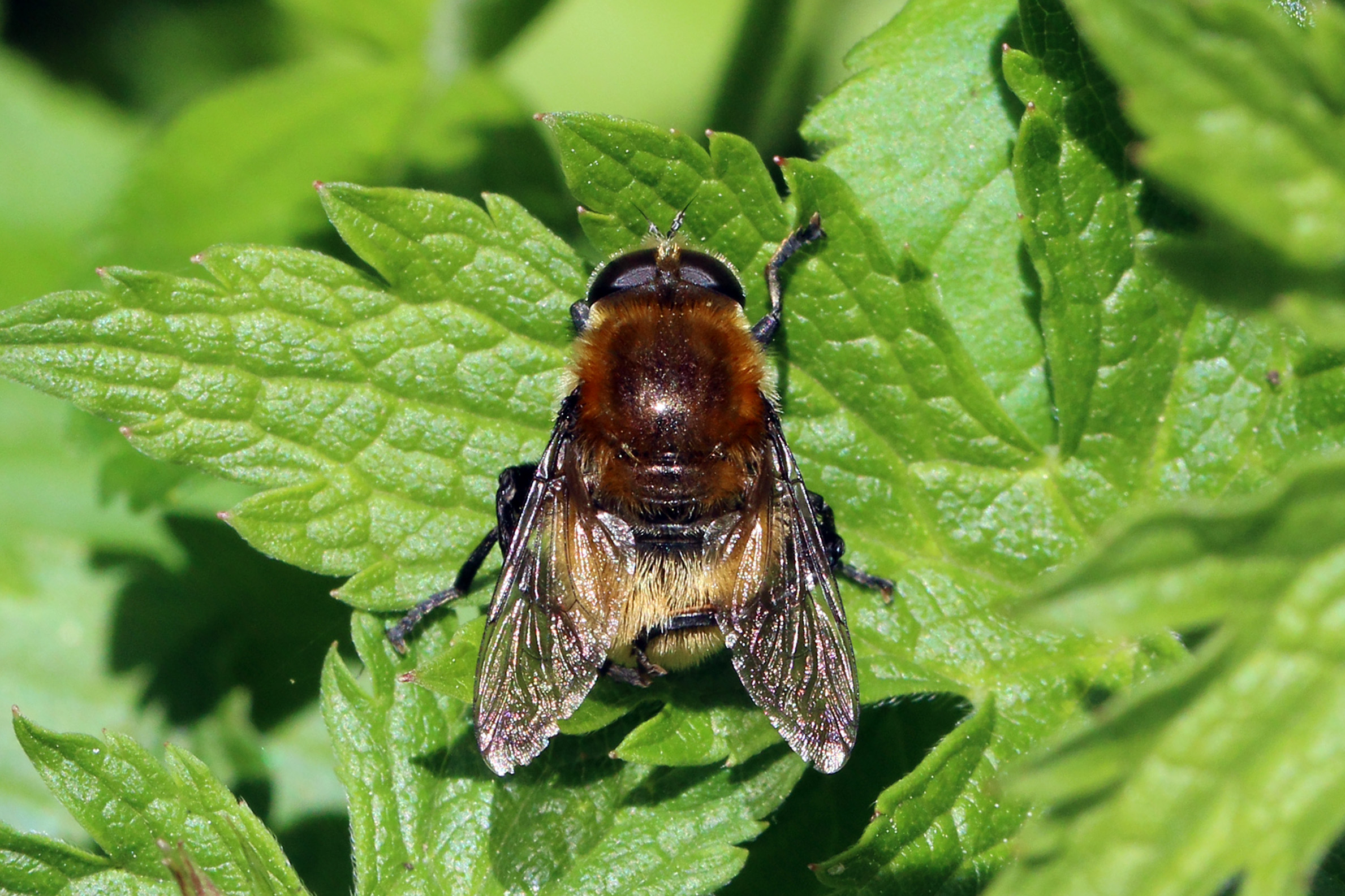
- Grooming

Conservation status
- Least Concern (IUCN 3.1)

Scientific classification
- Kingdom: Animalia
- Phylum: Arthropoda
- Clade: Pancrustacea
- Class: Insecta
- Order: Diptera
- Family: Syrphidae
- Genus: Merodon
- Species: M. equestris

Binomial name
- Merodon equestris (Fabricius, 1794)
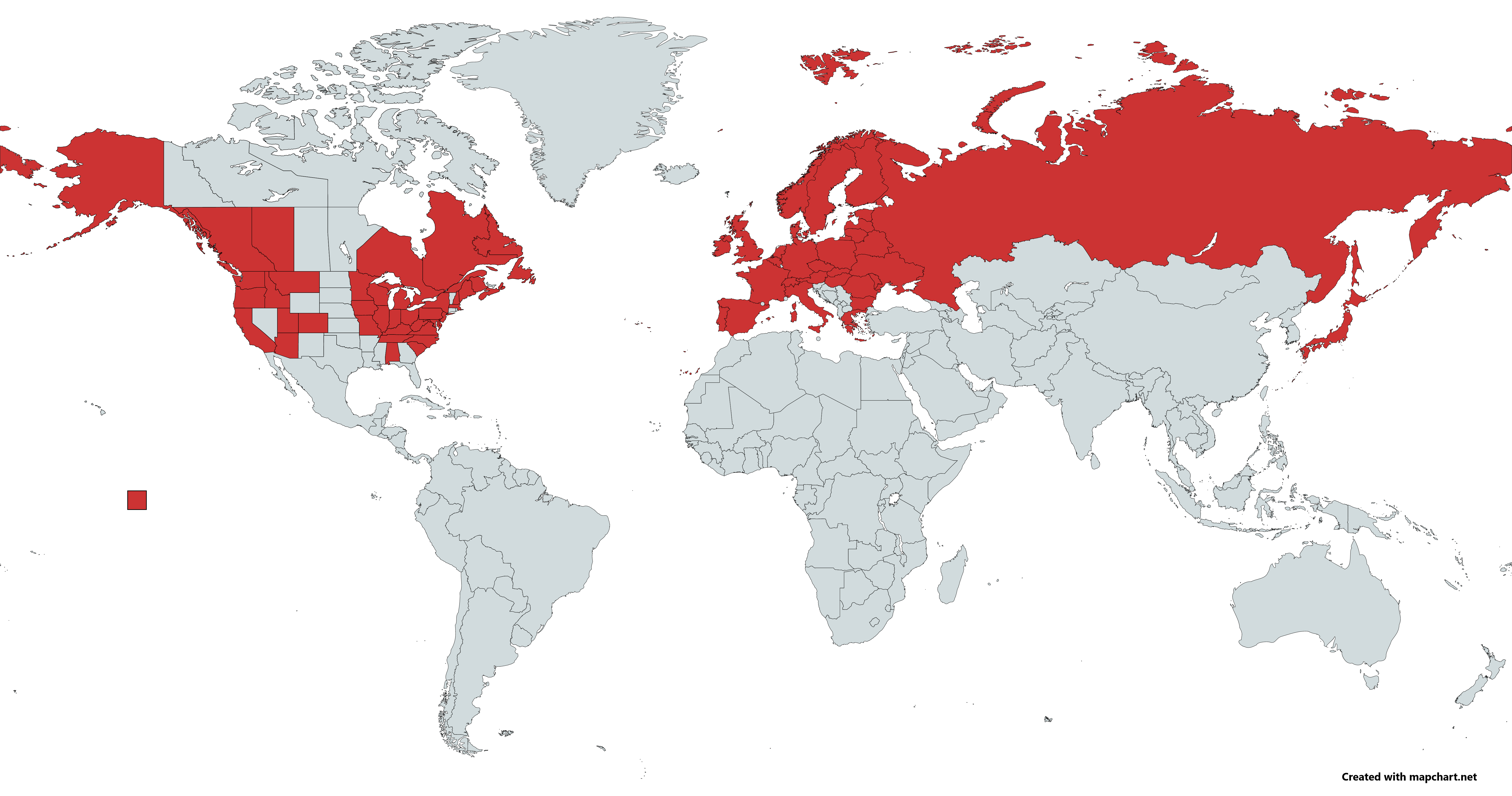
- Distribution map

Synonyms
- Eristalis narcissi Fabricius, 1805; Merodon narcissi (Fabricius, 1805); Merodon transversalis Meigen, 1822; Merodon validus Wiedemann, 1822; Syrphus equestris Fabricius, 1794

= Merodon equestris =

Species of fly

Merodon equestris (Narcissus bulb fly, greater bulb fly, large bulb fly, large Narcissus fly) is a Holarctic species of hoverfly (Family Syrphidae). Like many other hoverflies it displays a colouration pattern similar to a stinging insect (a bumblebee in this case) as an evolutionary defense mechanism. Other syrphid bee mimics are Mallota, Arctophila, Criorhina, Pocota and Brachypalpus. Merodon species are distinguished from these by the very strong hind femora, which bear a large triangular projection on the underside near the tip. It flies in low vegetation while the other bumblebee mimics prefer higher vegetation layers.

== Description ==
A stout fly with a small head (10–14 mm in length). The tergites are black, without the dust spots or blue-purple sheen of other Merodon species. The thorax and abdomen are hidden by dense, long, erect hairs of variable colouration. Tibia 3 of the male has 2 spurs at the apex. The larva is described and figured by Hodson (1932) and it is illustrated in colour by Rotheray (1993). Males have eyes clearly touching at the front, while in females these are separated by a (yellow haired) antenna like structure at the front.

== Distribution ==
In the Palearctic it is found from Fennoscandia south to Iberia and the Mediterranean basin, and Ireland east through Europe into Russia and Japan. In the Nearctic it is found from British Columbia south to California. It has been introduced to New Zealand. (see map)

== Biology ==
They inhabit open areas in deciduous forest up into the subalpine zone but significantly synanthropic, occurring in suburban parks and gardens and on horticultural land. The adult flies low in April to July with a fast zig-zag flight, among ground vegetation frequently settling on bare ground. Adult M. equestris feed on pollen and nectar. They visit a large variety of flowers for nectar, while the larvae feed internally in tissues of bulbs of Amaryllidaceae, and they are regarded as a horticultural pest, especially of Narcissus. Females lay 1 egg at a time on leaves of this plant (or in soil by it). Larvae overwinter in the bulbs. A bibliography of the literature on the biology of M. equestris is given by Barkemeyer (1994).

== Colour forms ==
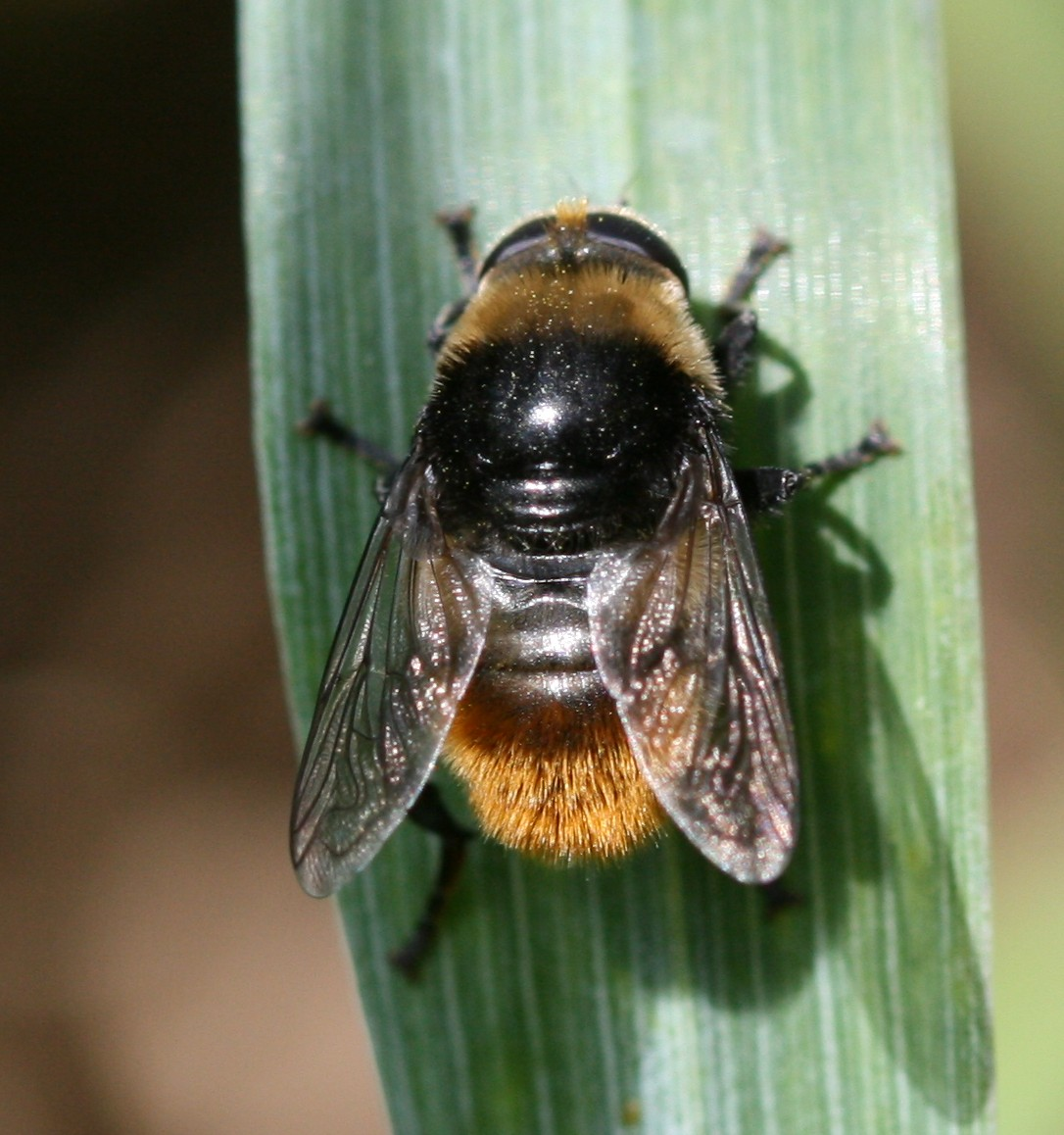
var. equestris (female)

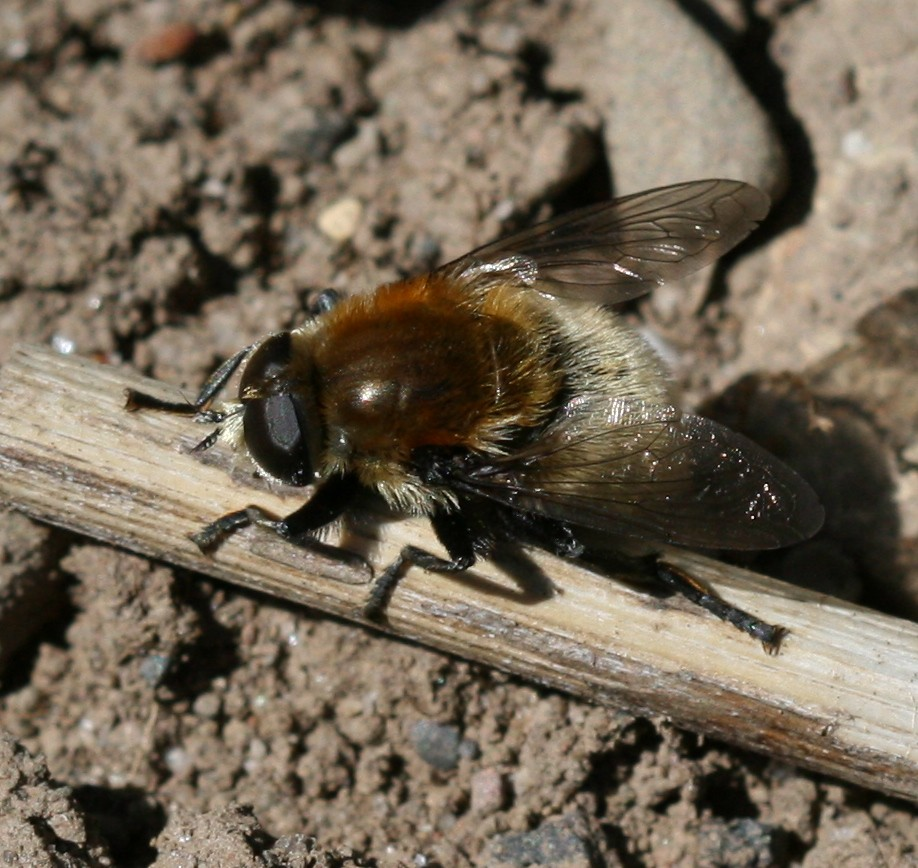
var. narcissi (male)

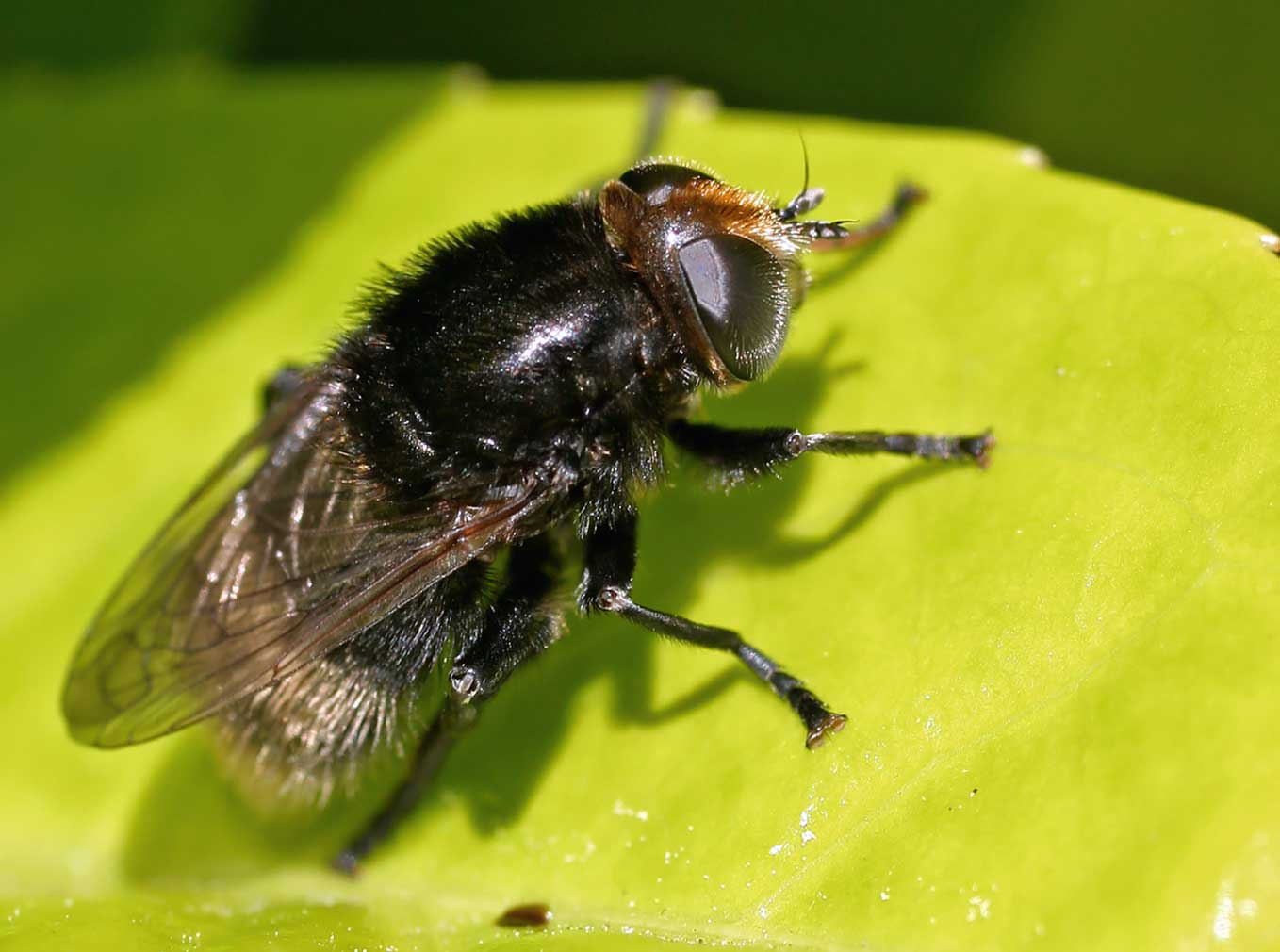
var. validus (female)
