= Temnostoma ruptizona =

Scientific classification
- Kingdom: Animalia
- Phylum: Arthropoda
- Class: Insecta
- Order: Diptera
- Family: Syrphidae
- Tribe: Milesiini
- Subtribe: Temnostomina
- Genus: Temnostoma
- Species: T. ruptizona

Binomial name
- Temnostoma ruptizona Cheng, 2012

Species of fly

Temnostoma ruptizona is a species of syrphid fly in the family Syrphidae.

== Distribution ==
China.
