= Spilomyia kahli =

Scientific classification
- Kingdom: Animalia
- Phylum: Arthropoda
- Class: Insecta
- Order: Diptera
- Family: Syrphidae
- Subfamily: Eristalinae
- Tribe: Milesiini
- Subtribe: Milesiina
- Genus: Spilomyia
- Species: S. kahli

Binomial name
- Spilomyia kahli Snow, 1895

Species of fly

Spilomyia kahli is a species of syrphid fly in the family Syrphidae.

== Distribution ==
Mexico, United States.
