= Spilomyia crandalli =

Scientific classification
- Kingdom: Animalia
- Phylum: Arthropoda
- Class: Insecta
- Order: Diptera
- Family: Syrphidae
- Subfamily: Eristalinae
- Tribe: Milesiini
- Subtribe: Milesiina
- Genus: Spilomyia
- Species: S. crandalli

Binomial name
- Spilomyia crandalli Curran, 1951

Species of fly

Spilomyia crandalli, Crandall's Hornet Fly, is a rare species of syrphid fly first officially described by Curran in 1951. This species is found in western North America near the Pacific coast. Hoverflies get their names from the ability to remain nearly motionless while in flight. The adults are also known as flower flies for they are commonly found around and on flowers, from which they get both energy-giving nectar and protein-rich pollen. The larvae are known as the short-tailed larvae, suited for moist areas such as rot holes of trees.

== Distribution ==
Arizona, New Mexico (USA) Mexico
