= Matsumyia trifasciata =

Scientific classification
- Kingdom: Animalia
- Phylum: Arthropoda
- Class: Insecta
- Order: Diptera
- Family: Syrphidae
- Subfamily: Eristalinae
- Tribe: Milesiini
- Subtribe: Criorhinina
- Genus: Matsumyia
- Species: M. trifasciata

Binomial name
- Matsumyia trifasciata (Shiraki, 1930)

Synonyms
- Criorrhina trifasciata Shiraki, 1930

Species of fly

Matsumyia trifasciata is a species of hoverfly belonging to the family Syrphidae.

It can be found in Taiwan. They are also diurnal.
