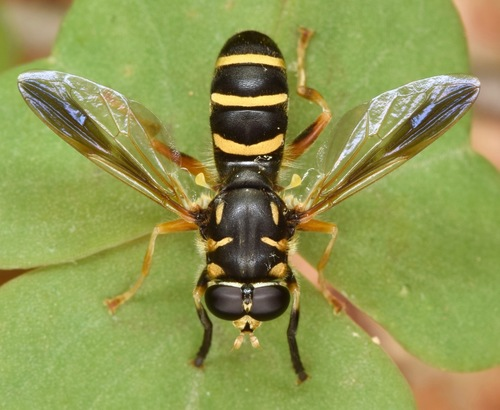
- Temnostoma trifasciatum

Scientific classification
- Kingdom: Animalia
- Phylum: Arthropoda
- Class: Insecta
- Order: Diptera
- Family: Syrphidae
- Subfamily: Eristalinae
- Tribe: Milesiini
- Subtribe: Temnostomina
- Genus: Temnostoma
- Species: T. trifasciatum

Binomial name
- Temnostoma trifasciatum (Robertson, 1901)

Synonyms
- Temnostoma trifasciata Robertson, 1901

= Temnostoma trifasciatum =

Species of fly

Temnostoma trifasciatum (Robertson, 1901), the Three-lined Falsehorn, is a rare species of syrphid fly observed in the eastern and central parts of the United States. Hoverflies can remain nearly motionless in flight. The adults are also known as flower flies for they are commonly found on flowers, from which they get both energy-giving nectar and protein-rich pollen. Temnostoma adults are strong wasp mimics. Larvae burrow in moist decayed wood.

== Distribution ==
Canada, United States
