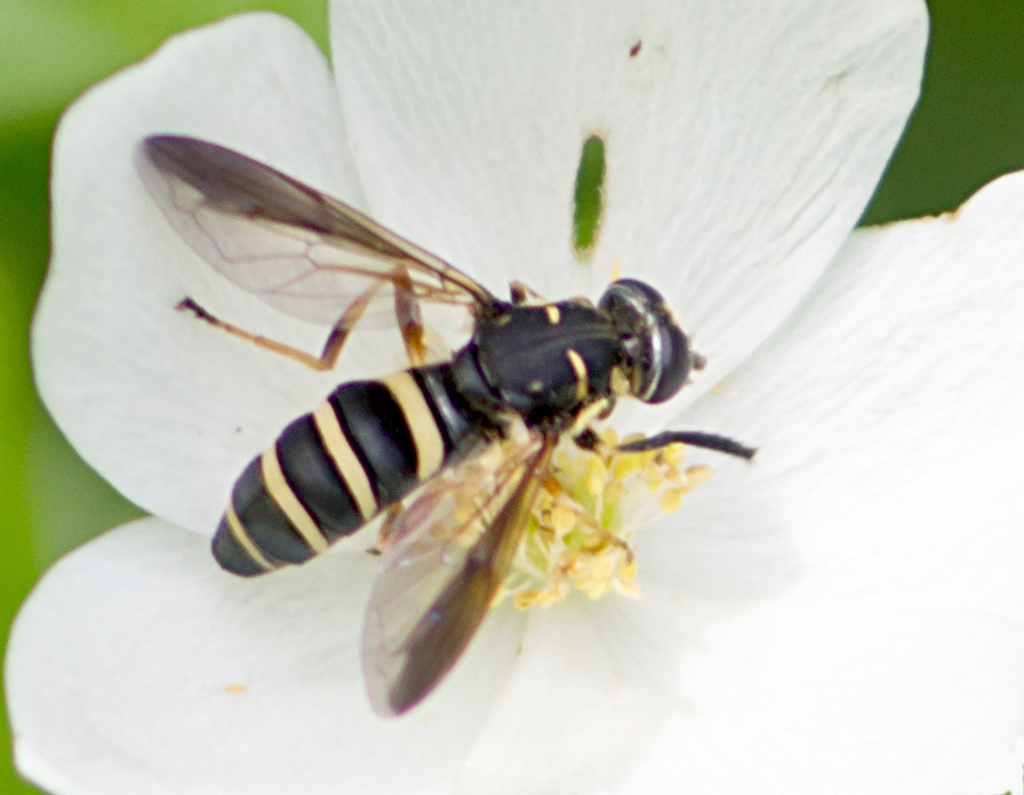
- T. barberi adult

Scientific classification
- Kingdom: Animalia
- Phylum: Arthropoda
- Class: Insecta
- Order: Diptera
- Family: Syrphidae
- Tribe: Milesiini
- Subtribe: Temnostomina
- Genus: Temnostoma
- Species: T. barberi

Binomial name
- Temnostoma barberi Curran, 1939

Synonyms
- Syrphus teretus Say, 1835; Temnostoma acra Curran, 1939; Temnostoma barberi Shannon, 1939

= Temnostoma barberi =

Species of fly

Temnostoma barberi (Curran, 1939), the Bare-bellied Falsehorn, is a fairly common species of syrphid fly (hoverfly) observed in the eastern half of the United States and adjacent areas of Canada. Hoverflies can remain nearly motionless in flight. The adults are also known as flower flies for they are commonly found on flowers, from which they get both energy-giving nectar and protein-rich pollen. Temnostoma adults are strong wasp mimics. The larvae burrow in moist decayed wood.

== Distribution ==
Canada, United States.
