= Matsumyia nigrofacies =

Scientific classification
- Kingdom: Animalia
- Phylum: Arthropoda
- Class: Insecta
- Order: Diptera
- Family: Syrphidae
- Subfamily: Eristalinae
- Tribe: Milesiini
- Subtribe: Criorhinina
- Genus: Matsumyia
- Species: M. nigrofacies

Binomial name
- Matsumyia nigrofacies Shiraki, 1949

Species of fly

Matsumyia nigrofacies is a species of hoverfly in the family Syrphidae.

== Distribution ==
Japan.
