= Spilomyia ephippium =

Scientific classification
- Kingdom: Animalia
- Phylum: Arthropoda
- Class: Insecta
- Order: Diptera
- Family: Syrphidae
- Subfamily: Eristalinae
- Tribe: Milesiini
- Subtribe: Milesiina
- Genus: Spilomyia
- Species: S. ephippium

Binomial name
- Spilomyia ephippium (Osten Sacken, 1875)

Synonyms
- Mixtemyia ephippium Osten Sacken, 1875

Species of fly

Spilomyia ephippium is a species of Hoverfly in the family Syrphidae.

== Distribution ==
Mexico.
