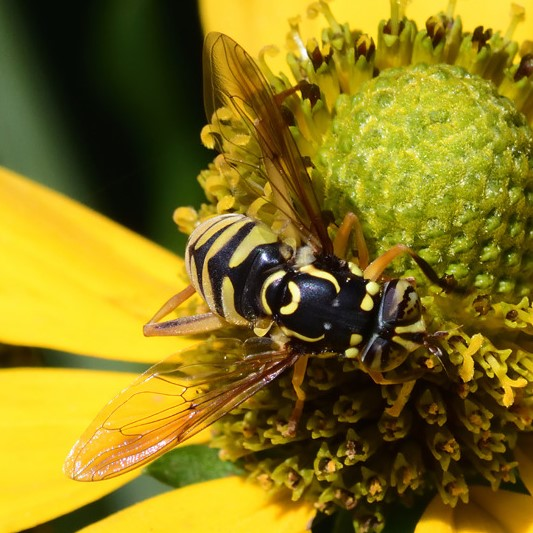

Scientific classification
- Kingdom: Animalia
- Phylum: Arthropoda
- Clade: Pancrustacea
- Class: Insecta
- Order: Diptera
- Family: Syrphidae
- Subfamily: Eristalinae
- Tribe: Milesiini
- Subtribe: Milesiina
- Genus: Spilomyia
- Species: S. digitata

Binomial name
- Spilomyia digitata (Rondani, 1865)

Synonyms
- Milesia digitata Rondani, 1865

= Spilomyia digitata =

Species of fly

Spilomyia digitata is a species of hoverfly in the family Syrphidae.

The species is distributed across Italy. The species is also diurnal.
