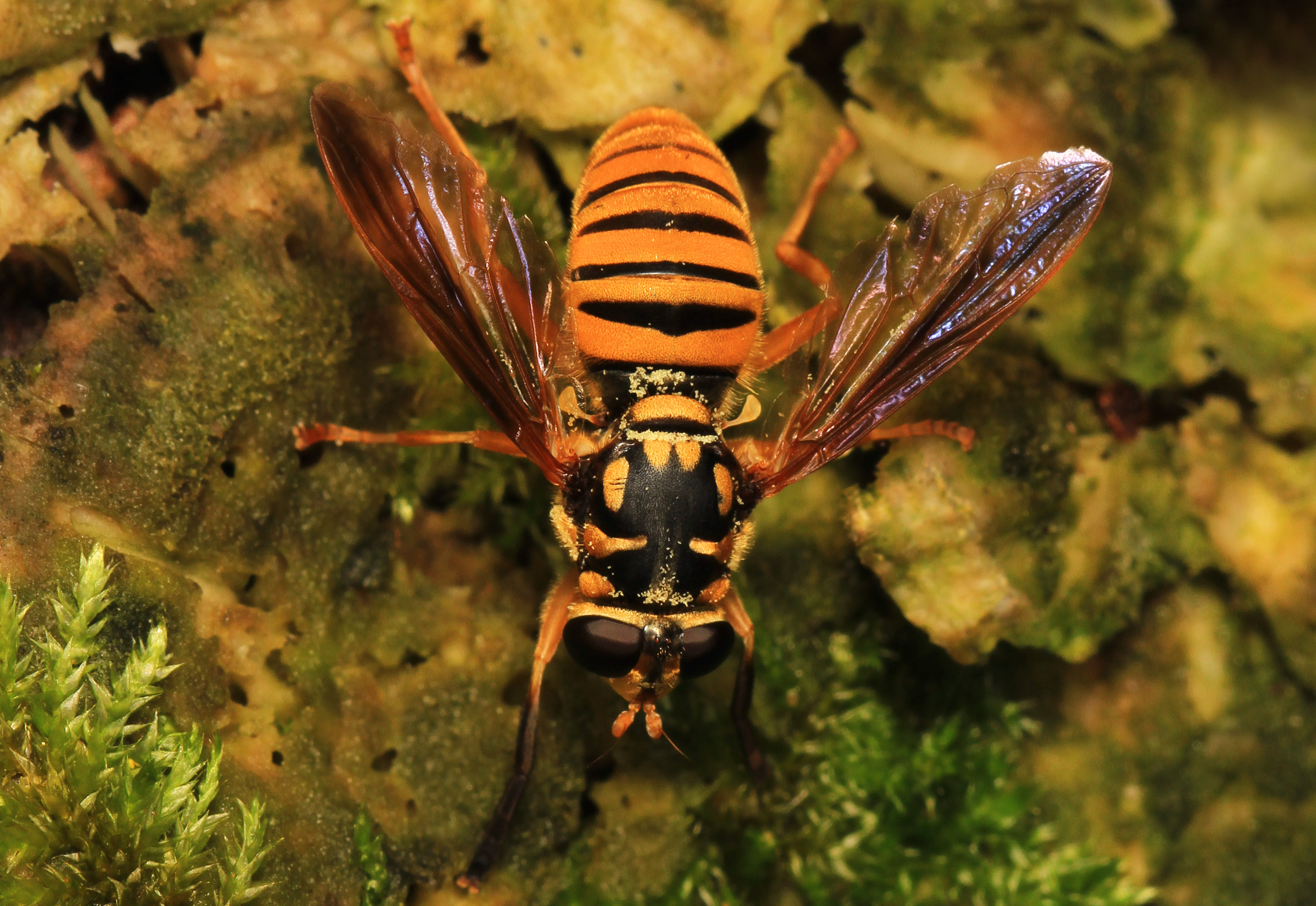

Scientific classification
- Kingdom: Animalia
- Phylum: Arthropoda
- Class: Insecta
- Order: Diptera
- Family: Syrphidae
- Tribe: Milesiini
- Subtribe: Temnostomina
- Genus: Temnostoma
- Species: T. daochus

Binomial name
- Temnostoma daochus (Walker, 1849)

Synonyms
- Milesia daochus Walker, 1849; Temnostoma greenei Shannon, 1939; Temnostoma pictulum Williston, 1887

= Temnostoma daochus =

Species of fly

Temnostoma daochus (Walker, 1849), the Yellow-spotted Falsehorn, is a rare species of syrphid fly observed in the eastern United States. Hoverflies can remain nearly motionless in flight. The adults are also known as flower flies for they are commonly found on flowers, from which they get both energy-giving nectar and protein-rich pollen. Temnostoma adults are strong wasp mimics. The larvae burrow in moist decayed wood.

== Distribution ==
United States
