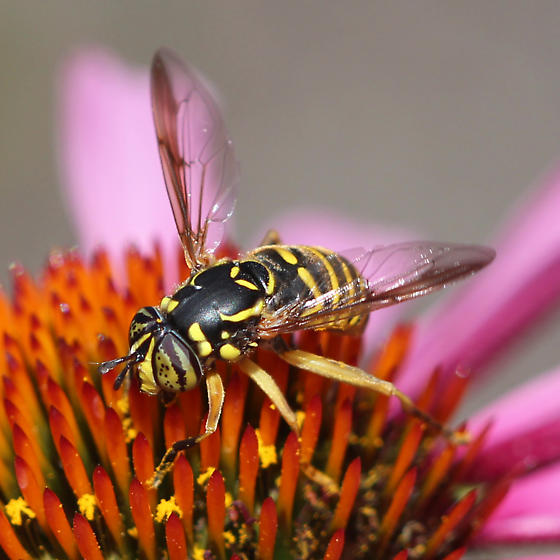
- Spilomyia citima

Scientific classification
- Kingdom: Animalia
- Phylum: Arthropoda
- Class: Insecta
- Order: Diptera
- Family: Syrphidae
- Subfamily: Eristalinae
- Tribe: Milesiini
- Subtribe: Milesiina
- Genus: Spilomyia
- Species: S. citima

Binomial name
- Spilomyia citima Vockeroth, 1958

Synonyms
- Spilomyia oregonensis Nayar & Cole, 1968

= Spilomyia citima =

Species of fly

Spilomyia citima, the Western Hornet Fly, is a rare species of syrphid fly first officially described by Vockeroth in 1958. Hoverflies get their names from the ability to remain nearly motionless while in flight. The adults are also known as flower flies for they are commonly found around and on flowers, from which they get both energy-giving nectar and protein-rich pollen. The larvae are known as the short-tailed larvae suited for moist areas such as rot holes of trees.

== Distribution ==
Canada, United States.
