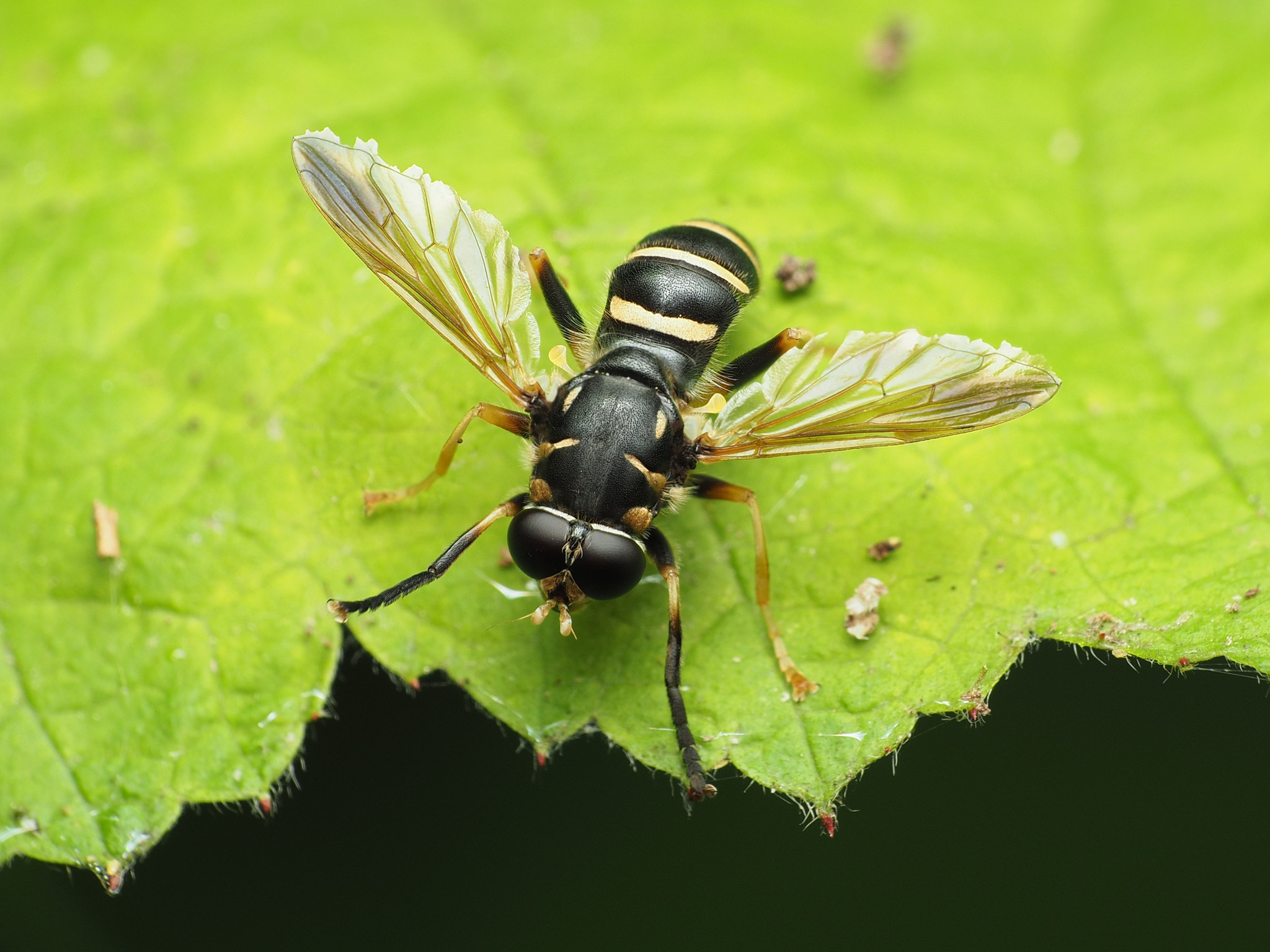
- Temnostoma balyras

Scientific classification
- Kingdom: Animalia
- Phylum: Arthropoda
- Class: Insecta
- Order: Diptera
- Family: Syrphidae
- Subfamily: Eristalinae
- Tribe: Milesiini
- Subtribe: Temnostomina
- Genus: Temnostoma
- Species: T. balyras

Binomial name
- Temnostoma balyras (Walker, 1849)

Synonyms
- Syrphus balyras Walker, 1849

= Temnostoma balyras =

Species of fly

Temnostoma balyras (Walker, 1849), the Yellow-haired Falsehorn , is a common species of syrphid fly observed in the eastern half of the United States and adjacent areas of Canada. Hoverflies can remain nearly motionless in flight. The adults are also known as flower flies for they are commonly found on flowers, from which they get both energy-giving nectar and protein-rich pollen. Larvae burrow in moist decayed wood using their hooks as rasping organs operated in a forwards and backwards motion by huge muscles housed in the mesothorax and metathorax. The larvae of T.balyras have been described by Heiss in "A classification of the larvae and puparia of the Syrphidae of Illinois exclusive of aquatic forms".

== Distribution ==
Canada, United States.
