= Temnostoma taiwanum =

Scientific classification
- Kingdom: Animalia
- Phylum: Arthropoda
- Class: Insecta
- Order: Diptera
- Family: Syrphidae
- Subfamily: Eristalinae
- Tribe: Milesiini
- Subtribe: Temnostomina
- Genus: Temnostoma
- Species: T. taiwanum

Binomial name
- Temnostoma taiwanum Shiraki, 1930

Species of fly

Temnostoma taiwanum is a species of syrphid fly in the family Syrphidae.

== Distribution ==
Taiwan.
