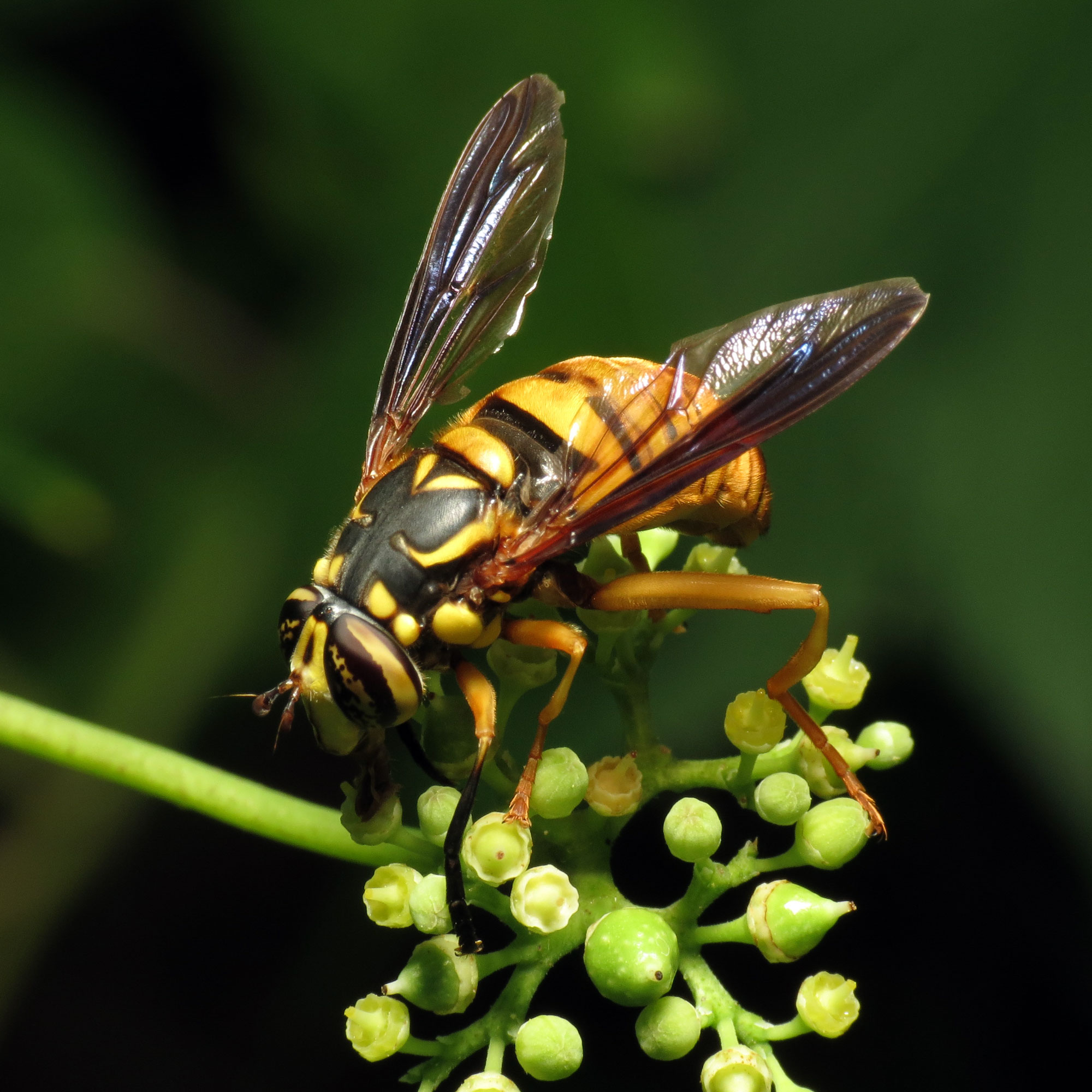

Scientific classification
- Kingdom: Animalia
- Phylum: Arthropoda
- Class: Insecta
- Order: Diptera
- Family: Syrphidae
- Subfamily: Eristalinae
- Tribe: Milesiini
- Subtribe: Milesiina
- Genus: Spilomyia
- Species: S. alcimus

Binomial name
- Spilomyia alcimus (Walker, 1849)

Synonyms
- Milesia alcimus Walker, 1849; Spilomyia hamifera Loew, 1864; Spilomyia texana Johnson, 1921

= Spilomyia alcimus =

Species of fly

Spilomyia alcimus, the Broad-banded Hornet Fly, is an uncommon species of syrphid fly first officially described by Walker in 1849. Hoverflies get their names from the ability to remain nearly motionless while in flight. The adults are also known as flower flies for they are commonly found around and on flowers, from which they get both energy-giving nectar and protein-rich pollen. The larvae are known as the short-tailed larvae suited for moist areas such as rot holes of trees.

== Distribution ==
Canada, United States.
