= Matsumyia trilineata =

Scientific classification
- Kingdom: Animalia
- Phylum: Arthropoda
- Class: Insecta
- Order: Diptera
- Family: Syrphidae
- Subfamily: Eristalinae
- Tribe: Milesiini
- Subtribe: Criorhinina
- Genus: Matsumyia
- Species: M. trilineata

Binomial name
- Matsumyia trilineata (Hull, 1943)

Synonyms
- Brachypalpus trilineatus Hull, 1943

Species of fly

Matsumyia trilineata is a species of hoverfly in the family Syrphidae.

== Distribution ==
Java.
