= Temnostoma jozankeanum =

Scientific classification
- Kingdom: Animalia
- Phylum: Arthropoda
- Class: Insecta
- Order: Diptera
- Family: Syrphidae
- Subfamily: Eristalinae
- Tribe: Milesiini
- Subtribe: Temnostomina
- Genus: Temnostoma
- Species: T. jozankeanum

Binomial name
- Temnostoma jozankeanum (Matsumura, 1916)

Synonyms
- Spilomyia jozankeana Matsumura, 1916

Species of fly

Temnostoma jozankeanum is a species of syrphid fly in the family Syrphidae.

== Distribution ==
Japan.
