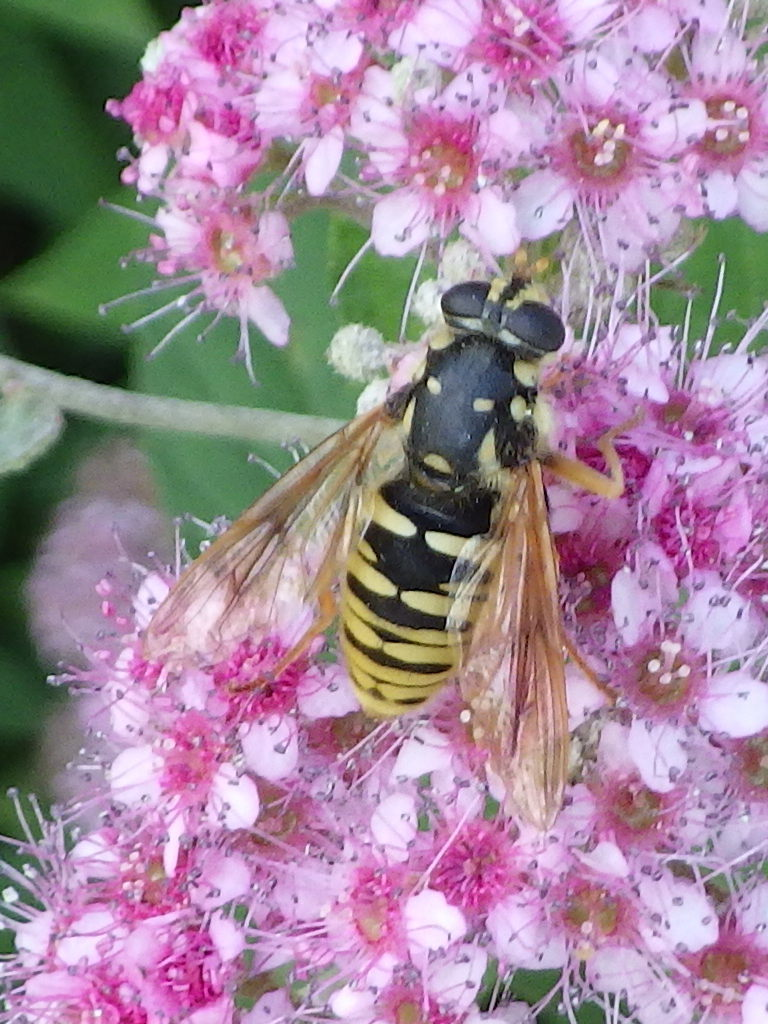

Scientific classification
- Domain: Eukaryota
- Kingdom: Animalia
- Phylum: Arthropoda
- Class: Insecta
- Order: Diptera
- Family: Syrphidae
- Tribe: Milesiini
- Subtribe: Temnostomina
- Genus: Temnostoma
- Species: T. alternans

Binomial name
- Temnostoma alternans Loew, 1864

= Temnostoma alternans =

Species of fly

Temnostoma alternans (Loew, 1864), the Wasp-like falsehorn, is a common species of syrphid fly observed throughout the northern and central United States and widespread in Canada. Hoverflies can remain nearly motionless in flight. The adults are also known as flower flies for they are commonly found on flowers, from which they get both energy-giving nectar and protein-rich pollen. Larvae burrow in moist decayed wood.

== Distribution ==
Canada, United States.
