= Spilomyia panfilovi =

Scientific classification
- Kingdom: Animalia
- Phylum: Arthropoda
- Class: Insecta
- Order: Diptera
- Family: Syrphidae
- Subfamily: Eristalinae
- Tribe: Milesiini
- Subtribe: Milesiina
- Genus: Spilomyia
- Species: S. panfilovi

Binomial name
- Spilomyia panfilovi Zimina, 1952

Species of fly

Spilomyia panfilovi is a species of Hoverfly in the family Syrphidae.

== Distribution ==
Russia.
