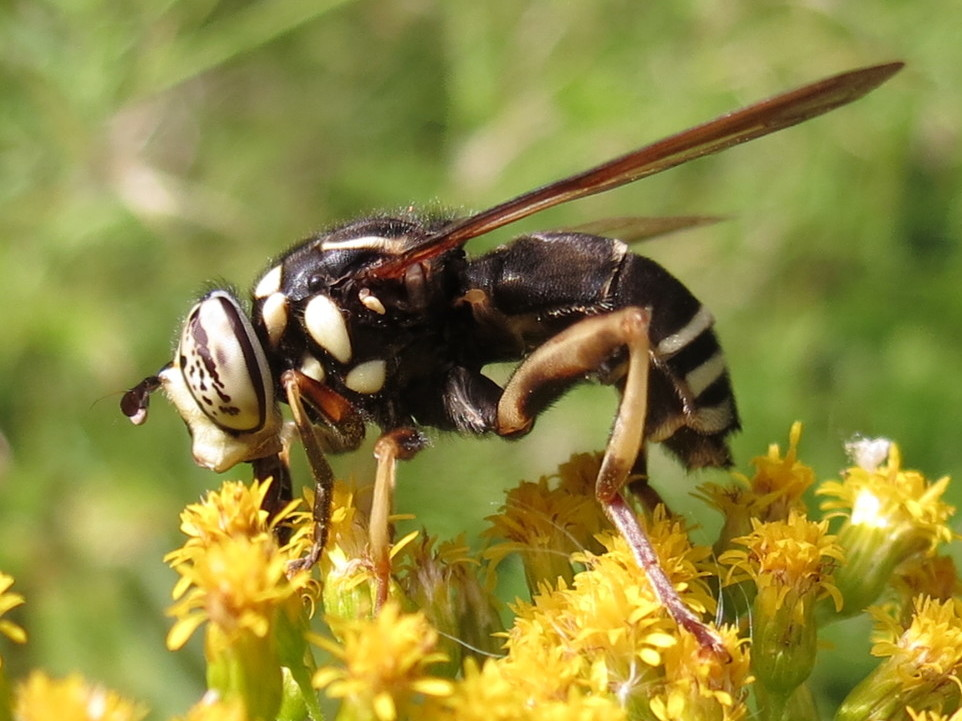
- Spilomyia fusca

Scientific classification
- Kingdom: Animalia
- Phylum: Arthropoda
- Class: Insecta
- Order: Diptera
- Family: Syrphidae
- Subfamily: Eristalinae
- Tribe: Milesiini
- Subtribe: Milesiina
- Genus: Spilomyia
- Species: S. fusca

Binomial name
- Spilomyia fusca Loew, 1864

= Spilomyia fusca =

Species of fly

Spilomyia fusca, the Bald-faced Hornet Fly, is a fairly common species of syrphid fly first officially described by Loew, 1864 This species is found in eastern North America. Hoverflies get their names from the ability to remain nearly motionless while in flight. The adults are also known as flower flies for they are commonly found around and on flowers from which they get both energy-giving nectar and protein-rich pollen. The larvae are known as the short-tailed larva tailored for moist areas such as rot holes of trees.

== Distribution ==
Canada, United States.
