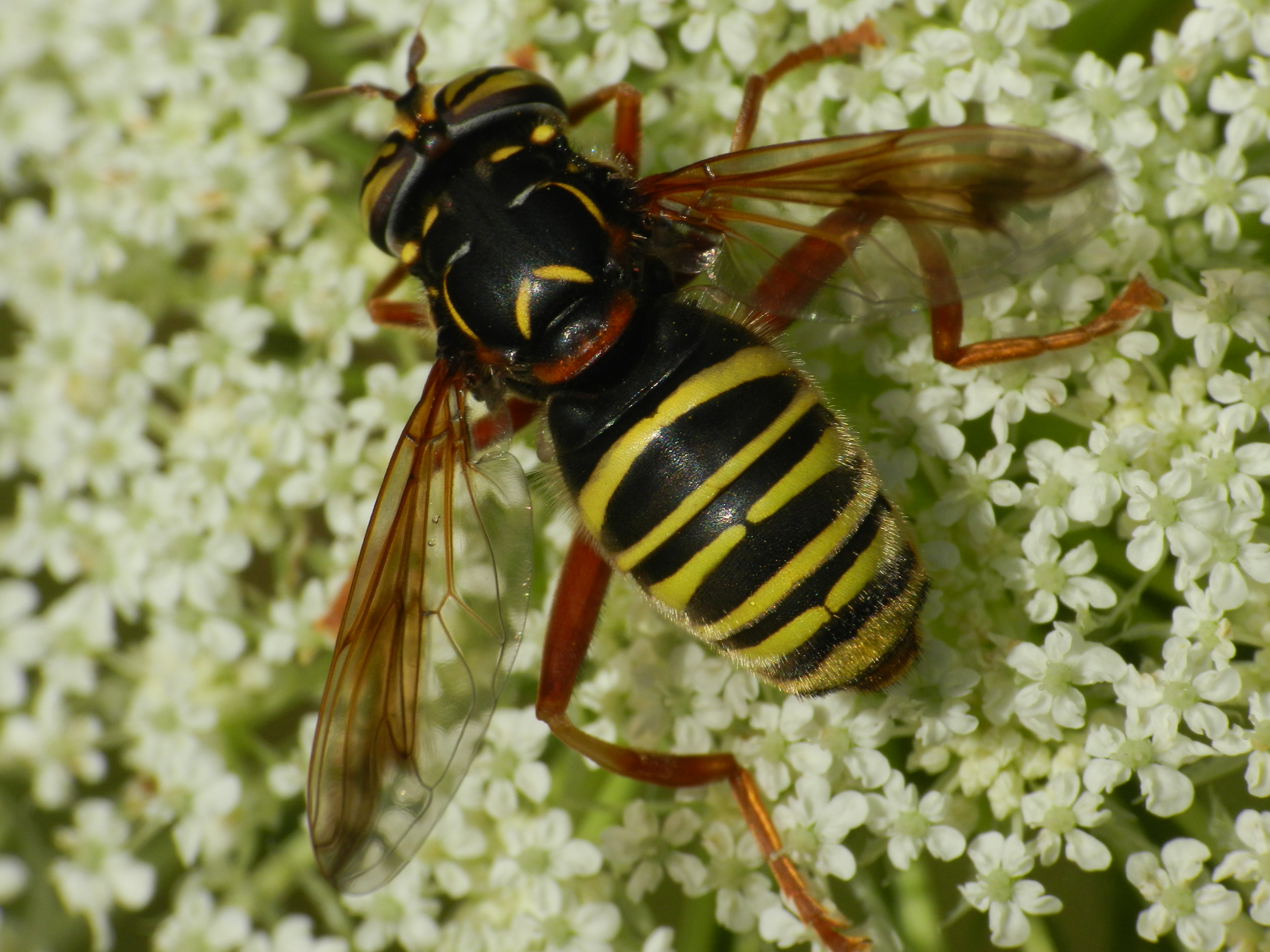

Scientific classification
- Kingdom: Animalia
- Phylum: Arthropoda
- Class: Insecta
- Order: Diptera
- Family: Syrphidae
- Subfamily: Eristalinae
- Tribe: Milesiini
- Subtribe: Milesiina
- Genus: Spilomyia
- Species: S. diophthalma

Binomial name
- Spilomyia diophthalma (Linnaeus, 1758)

Synonyms
- Musca diophthalma Linnaeus, 1758

= Spilomyia diophthalma =

Species of fly

Spilomyia diophthalma is a species of hoverfly in the family Syrphidae.

== Distribution ==
Sweden.
