= Spilomyia permagna =

Scientific classification
- Kingdom: Animalia
- Phylum: Arthropoda
- Class: Insecta
- Order: Diptera
- Family: Syrphidae
- Subfamily: Eristalinae
- Tribe: Milesiini
- Subtribe: Milesiina
- Genus: Spilomyia
- Species: S. permagna

Binomial name
- Spilomyia permagna Stackelberg, 1958

Species of fly

Spilomyia permagna is a species of Hoverfly in the family Syrphidae.

== Distribution ==
Japan.
