= Merodon olympius =

Conservation status
- Critically Endangered (IUCN 3.1)

Scientific classification
- Kingdom: Animalia
- Phylum: Arthropoda
- Clade: Pancrustacea
- Class: Insecta
- Order: Diptera
- Family: Syrphidae
- Genus: Merodon
- Species: M. olympius

Binomial name
- Merodon olympius Vujić & Radenković, 2020

Species of hoverfly

Merodon olympius is a species of hoverfly. It is endemic to the Olympus Mountain of Greece, and it is restricted to a range of 12km^{2}. It is threatened by tourism and overgrazing by livestock.

== Habitat ==
Merodon olympius is found in mesophilous forests, and is mostly active in September. It has been recorded visiting flowers of the genus Achillea.
