= Spilomyia pleuralis =

Scientific classification
- Kingdom: Animalia
- Phylum: Arthropoda
- Class: Insecta
- Order: Diptera
- Family: Syrphidae
- Subfamily: Eristalinae
- Tribe: Milesiini
- Subtribe: Milesiina
- Genus: Spilomyia
- Species: S. pleuralis

Binomial name
- Spilomyia pleuralis Williston, 1887

Species of fly

Spilomyia pleuralis is a species of Hoverfly in the family Syrphidae.

== Distribution ==
Mexico.
