= Matsumyia jesoensis =

Scientific classification
- Kingdom: Animalia
- Phylum: Arthropoda
- Class: Insecta
- Order: Diptera
- Family: Syrphidae
- Subfamily: Eristalinae
- Tribe: Milesiini
- Subtribe: Criorhinina
- Genus: Matsumyia
- Species: M. jesoensis

Binomial name
- Matsumyia jesoensis Matsumura, 1911

Synonyms
- Priomerus jesoensis Matsumura, 1911

Species of fly

Matsumyia jesoensis is a species of hoverfly in the family Syrphidae.

== Distribution ==
Russia.
