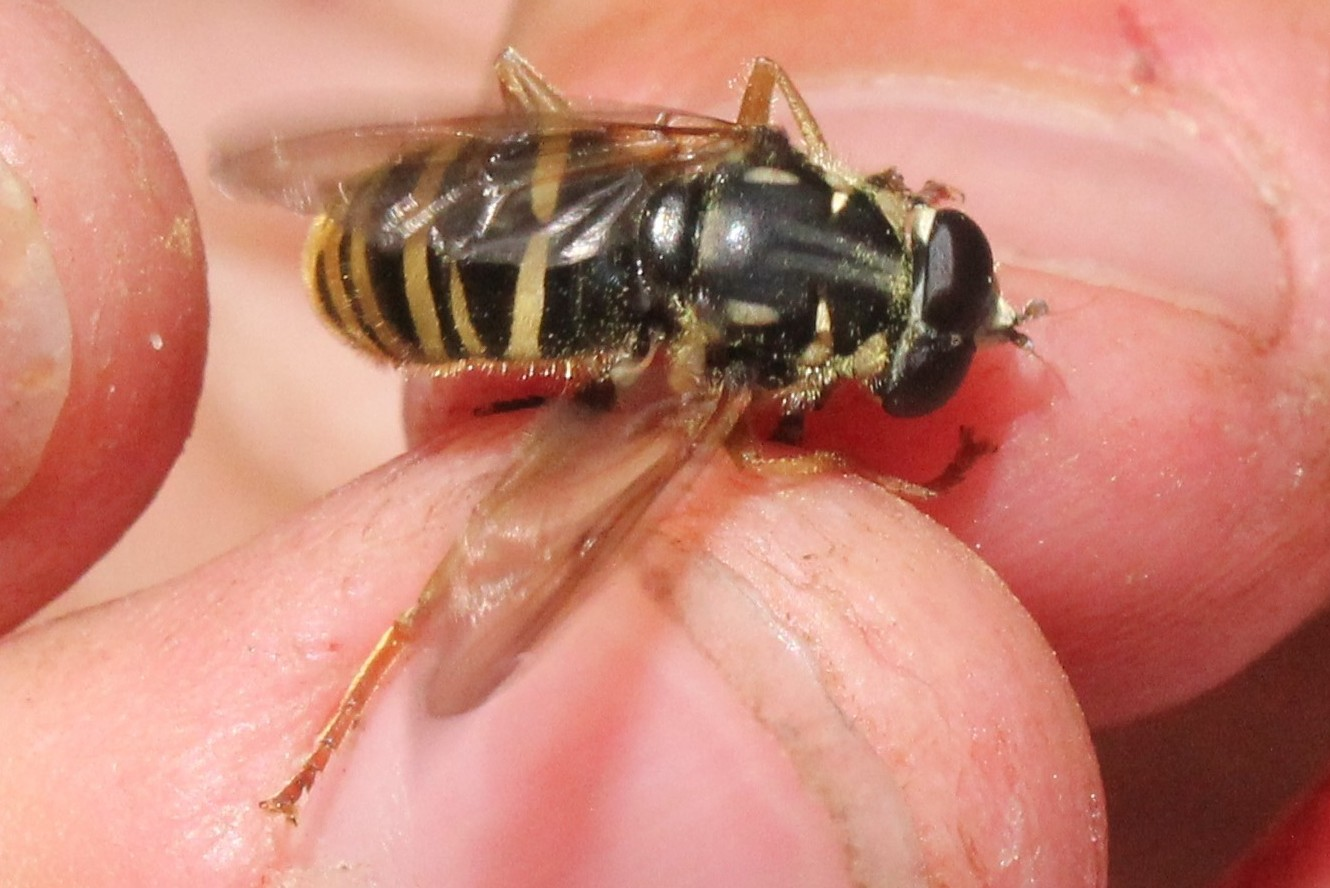
- T. excentrica

Scientific classification
- Kingdom: Animalia
- Phylum: Arthropoda
- Class: Insecta
- Order: Diptera
- Family: Syrphidae
- Subfamily: Eristalinae
- Tribe: Milesiini
- Subtribe: Temnostomina
- Genus: Temnostoma
- Species: T. excentricum

Binomial name
- Temnostoma excentricum Harris, 1841

Synonyms
- Milesia excentrica Harris, 1835; Milesia excentrica Harris, 1841

= Temnostoma excentricum =

Species of fly

Temnostoma excentrica (Harris, 1841 ), the Black-spotted Falsehorn , is a common species of syrphid fly observed throughout the United States and Canada. Hoverflies can remain nearly motionless in flight. The adults are also known as flower flies for they are commonly found on flowers, from which they get both energy-giving nectar and protein-rich pollen. Temnostoma adults are strong wasp mimics. The larvae burrow in moist decayed wood.

== Distribution ==
Canada, Northern United States.
