= Spilomyia foxleei =

Scientific classification
- Kingdom: Animalia
- Phylum: Arthropoda
- Class: Insecta
- Order: Diptera
- Family: Syrphidae
- Subfamily: Eristalinae
- Tribe: Milesiini
- Subtribe: Milesiina
- Genus: Spilomyia
- Species: S. foxleei

Binomial name
- Spilomyia foxleei Vockeroth, 1958

Species of fly

Spilomyia foxleei is a species of syrphid fly in the family Syrphidae.

== Distribution ==
Canada: British Columbia, United States:California, Oregon, Washington
