= Temnostoma ravicauda =

Scientific classification
- Kingdom: Animalia
- Phylum: Arthropoda
- Class: Insecta
- Order: Diptera
- Family: Syrphidae
- Tribe: Milesiini
- Subtribe: Temnostomina
- Genus: Temnostoma
- Species: T. ravicauda

Binomial name
- Temnostoma ravicauda He & Chu, 1995

Species of fly

Temnostoma ravicauda is a species of syrphid fly in the family Syrphidae.

== Distribution ==
China.
