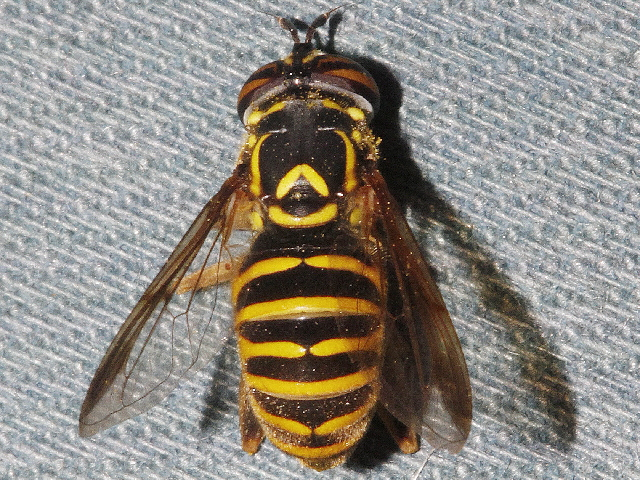

Scientific classification
- Kingdom: Animalia
- Phylum: Arthropoda
- Clade: Pancrustacea
- Class: Insecta
- Order: Diptera
- Family: Syrphidae
- Subfamily: Eristalinae
- Tribe: Milesiini
- Subtribe: Milesiina
- Genus: Spilomyia
- Species: S. interrupta

Binomial name
- Spilomyia interrupta Williston, 1882

= Spilomyia interrupta =

Species of fly

Spilomyia intertupta, the interrupted hornet fly, is an uncommon species of syrphid fly first officially described by Williston, 1882. This species is found in western North America. Hoverflies get their names from the ability to remain nearly motionless while in flight. The adults are also known as flower flies for they are commonly found around and on flowers, from which they get both energy-giving nectar and protein-rich pollen. The larvae are known as the short-tailed larva, suited for moist areas such as rot holes of trees.

== Distribution ==
Canada, United States.
