= Matsumyia setosa =

Scientific classification
- Kingdom: Animalia
- Phylum: Arthropoda
- Class: Insecta
- Order: Diptera
- Family: Syrphidae
- Subfamily: Eristalinae
- Tribe: Milesiini
- Subtribe: Criorhinina
- Genus: Matsumyia
- Species: M. setosa

Binomial name
- Matsumyia setosa (Shiraki, 1930)

Synonyms
- Criorhina setosa Shiraki, 1930

Species of fly

Matsumyia setosa is a species of hoverfly in the family Syrphidae.

== Distribution ==
Japan.
