= Pius Sack =

German entomologist (1865–1946)

Pius Sack (3 December 1865 – 5 February 1946) was a German entomologist who specialised in Diptera

His collection of World Diptera is conserved in Naturmuseum Senckenberg.

== Works ==
partial list

- 1913. Die Gattung Merodon Meigen (Lampetia Meigen olim.). Abhandlungen des Senckenbergische Gesellschafts der Naturforscher 31: 427-462
- 1928 Die Ausbeute der deutschen Chaco-Expedition 4. Diptera Syrphidae / von P. Sack [Stuttgart] Württ. Naturaliensammlung 1928 in the series Mitteilungen aus dem Königlichen Naturalienkabinett zu Stuttgart, 128.
- 1931 Syrphidae (Diptera) der Deutschen Limnologischen Sunda-Expedition.
- 1930 Zweiflügler, oder, Diptera. IV, Syrphidae-Conopidae / P. Sack, O. Kröber. Jena G. Fischer, 1930.in the series Tierwelt Deutschlands und der angrenzenden Meeresteile nach ihren Merkmalen und nach ihrer Lebensweise, T. 20.
- 1932 Syrphiden (Diptera) von den Kleinen Sunda-Inseln. (Ergebnisse der Sunda-Expedition Rensch.)

Several parts of Die Fliegen der paläarktischen Region (the Flies of the Palaearctic Region) edited by Erwin Lindner
