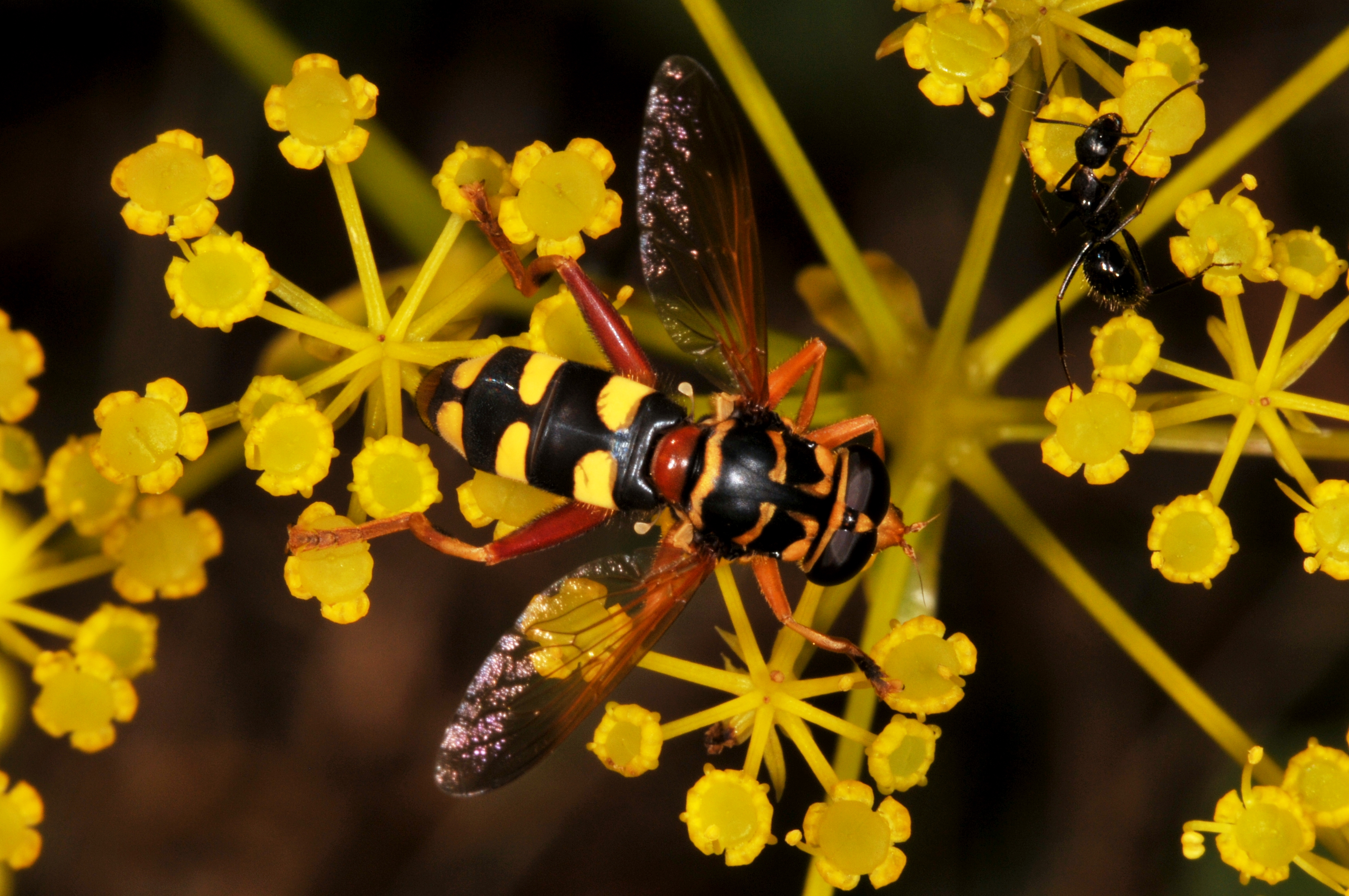

Scientific classification
- Kingdom: Animalia
- Phylum: Arthropoda
- Clade: Pancrustacea
- Class: Insecta
- Order: Diptera
- Family: Syrphidae
- Subfamily: Eristalinae
- Tribe: Milesiini
- Subtribe: Milesiina
- Genus: Milesia
- Species: M. semiluctifera

Binomial name
- Milesia semiluctifera (Villers, 1789)

Synonyms
- Musca semiluctifera Villers, 1789; Eristalis fulminans Fabricius, 1805; Syrphus splendidus Rossi, 1790; Musca naevia Gmelin, 1790

= Milesia semiluctifera =

Species of fly

Milesia semiluctifera is a species of hoverfly in the family Syrphidae.

== Distribution ==
France.
