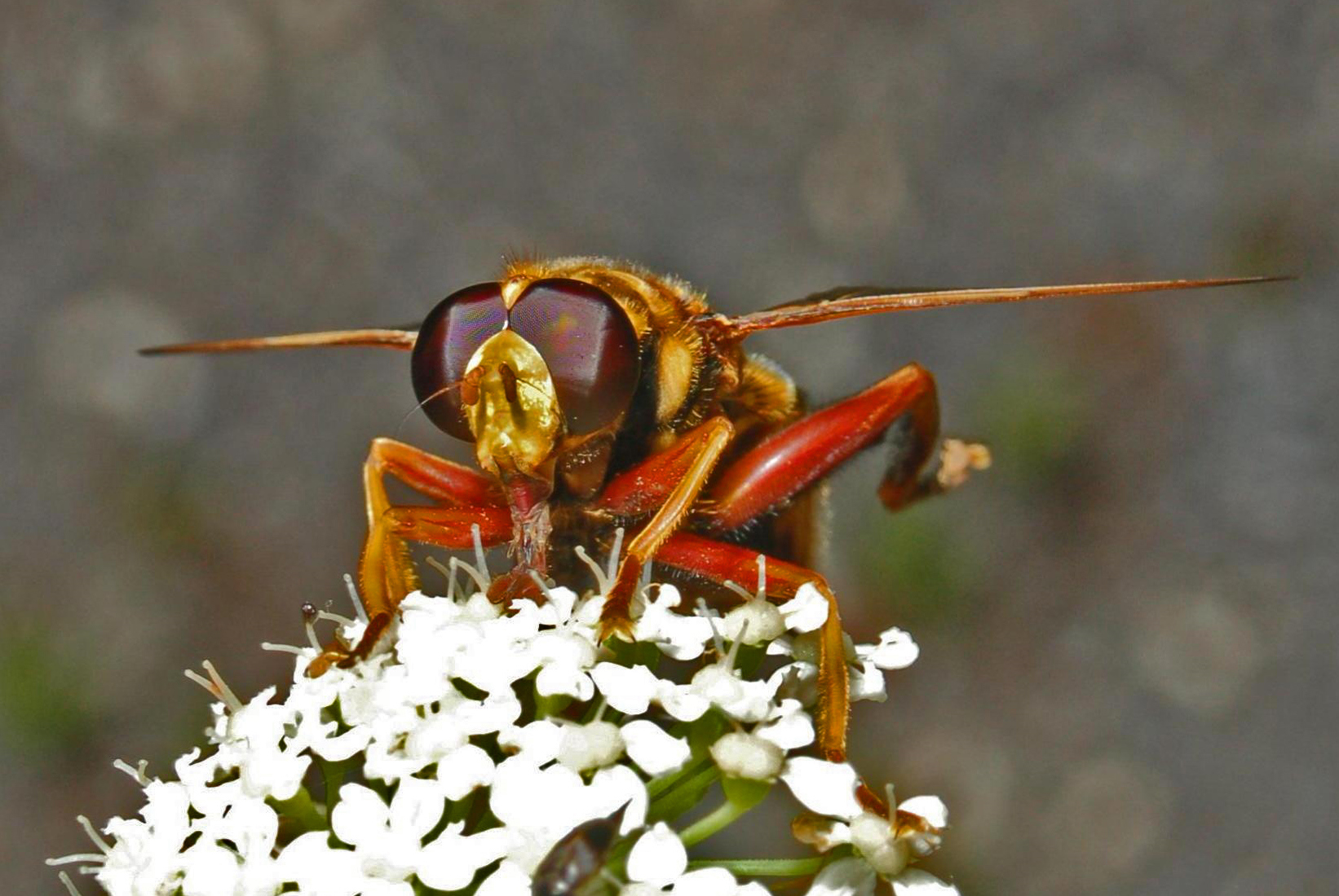
- Milesia crabroniformis. Male, frontal view
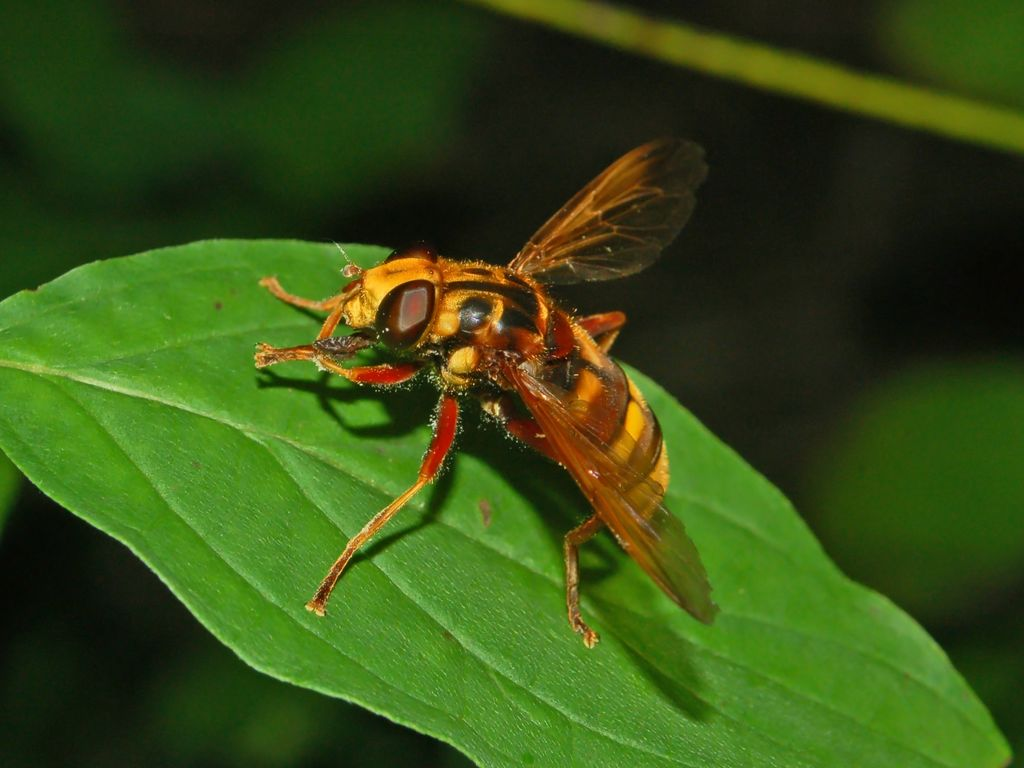
- Female, dorsal view

Scientific classification
- Kingdom: Animalia
- Phylum: Arthropoda
- Clade: Pancrustacea
- Class: Insecta
- Order: Diptera
- Family: Syrphidae
- Subfamily: Eristalinae
- Tribe: Milesiini
- Subtribe: Milesiina
- Genus: Milesia
- Species: M. crabroniformis

Binomial name
- Milesia crabroniformis (Fabricius, 1775)

Synonyms
- Syrphus crabroniformis Fabricius, 1775; Milesia coenina Walker, 1849; Syrphus gigas Rossi, 1790; Musca crabroniformis Villers, 1789

= Milesia crabroniformis =

Species of fly

Milesia crabroniformis is a species of flower flies or hoverflies belonging to the family Syrphidae subfamily Eristalinae.

== Distribution ==
This species is mainly present in Belgium, France, Greece, Italy, Spain, Portugal, Switzerland, in the Near East and in North Africa.

== Description ==
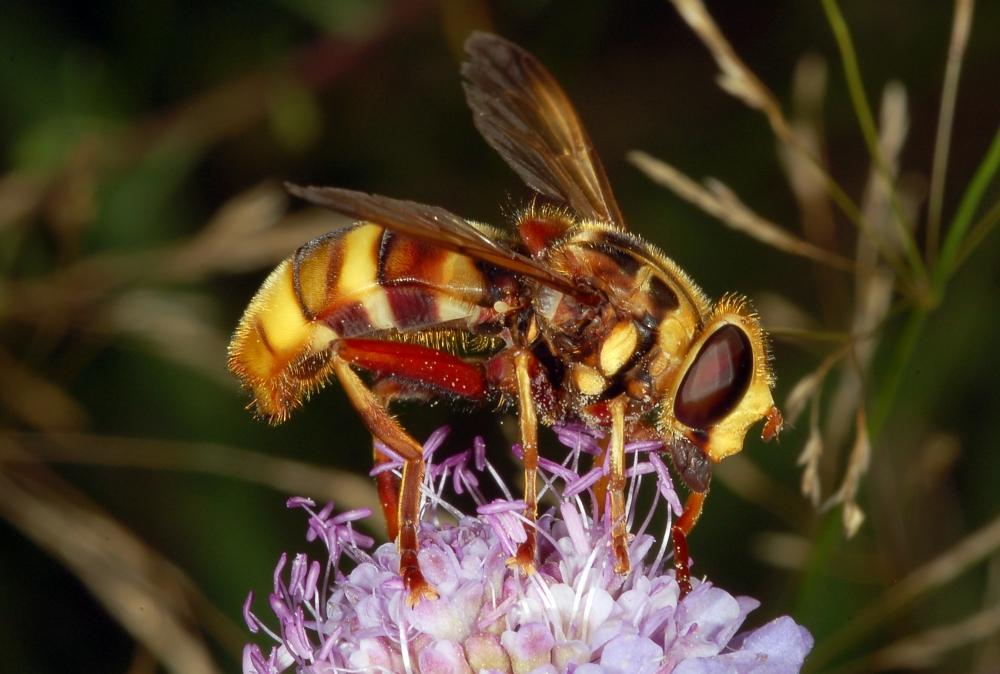
Milesia crabroniformis, side view

The adults of Milesia crabroniformis grow up to 22–25 millimetres (0.87–0.98 in) long. These rather uncommon hoverflies are the largest among the European species.

They show a yellow face, reddish femurs, a yellow-brown abdomen and its wings are shaded with yellow-orange. Eyes of males are holoptic, although they meet along the dorsal length of the head in a very low point of contact.

They mimic the hornet species Vespa crabro (hence the Latin name crabroniformis, meaning ‘hornet-formed’). It is also very similar to Volucella zonaria, a smaller syrphid.

== Biology ==
Adults can mainly be encountered from June through October, with a peak at the end of August. They inhabit evergreen and deciduous forests (Quercus and Fagus species), feeding on nectar of flowers of several plants (Apiaceae species, Lythrum salicaria, Mentha aquatica, Sambucus ebulus, Hedera species, Cirsium species, etc.).

Their larvae develop on decaying wood and rotting cavities of old Fagus and Quercus species.
