= Milesia diardi =

Scientific classification
- Kingdom: Animalia
- Phylum: Arthropoda
- Clade: Pancrustacea
- Class: Insecta
- Order: Diptera
- Family: Syrphidae
- Subfamily: Eristalinae
- Tribe: Milesiini
- Subtribe: Milesiina
- Genus: Milesia
- Species: M. diardi

Binomial name
- Milesia diardi Snellen van Vollenhoven, 1863

Synonyms
- Milesia callida Curran, 1928; Sphixea doriae Rondani, 1875; Sphixea fulvifrons Bigot, 1884; Sphixea fulvipes Bigot, 1884

Species of fly

Milesia diardi is a species of hoverfly in the family Syrphidae.

== Distribution ==
Borneo.
