= Milesia nigra =

Scientific classification
- Kingdom: Animalia
- Phylum: Arthropoda
- Clade: Pancrustacea
- Class: Insecta
- Order: Diptera
- Family: Syrphidae
- Subfamily: Eristalinae
- Tribe: Milesiini
- Subtribe: Milesiina
- Genus: Milesia
- Species: M. nigra

Binomial name
- Milesia nigra Fluke, 1939

Species of fly

Milesia nigra is a species of hoverfly in the family Syrphidae.

== Distribution ==
Panama.
