= Stilbosoma rubiceps =

Scientific classification
- Kingdom: Animalia
- Phylum: Arthropoda
- Class: Insecta
- Order: Diptera
- Family: Syrphidae
- Subfamily: Eristalinae
- Tribe: Milesiini
- Subtribe: Milesiina
- Genus: Stilbosoma
- Species: S. rubiceps

Binomial name
- Stilbosoma rubiceps Philippi, 1865

Synonyms
- Stilbosoma ruficeps Williston, 1886

Species of fly

Stilbosoma rubiceps is a species of Hoverfly in the family Syrphidae.

== Distribution ==
Chile.
