= Milesia verticalis =

Scientific classification
- Kingdom: Animalia
- Phylum: Arthropoda
- Clade: Pancrustacea
- Class: Insecta
- Order: Diptera
- Family: Syrphidae
- Subfamily: Eristalinae
- Tribe: Milesiini
- Subtribe: Milesiina
- Genus: Milesia
- Species: M. verticalis

Binomial name
- Milesia verticalis Brunetti, 1923

Synonyms
- Milesia turgidiverticis Yang & Cheng, 1993; Milesia vesparia Shiraki, 1930

Species of fly

Milesia verticalis is a species of hoverfly in the family Syrphidae.

== Distribution ==
India.
