= Milesia overlaeti =

Scientific classification
- Kingdom: Animalia
- Phylum: Arthropoda
- Clade: Pancrustacea
- Class: Insecta
- Order: Diptera
- Family: Syrphidae
- Subfamily: Eristalinae
- Tribe: Milesiini
- Subtribe: Milesiina
- Genus: Milesia
- Species: M. overlaeti

Binomial name
- Milesia overlaeti (Doesburg, 1955)

Synonyms
- Pogonosyrphus overlaeti Doesburg, 1955

Species of fly

Milesia overlaeti is a species of hoverfly in the family Syrphidae.

== Distribution ==
Congo.
