= Milesia semifulva =

Scientific classification
- Kingdom: Animalia
- Phylum: Arthropoda
- Clade: Pancrustacea
- Class: Insecta
- Order: Diptera
- Family: Syrphidae
- Subfamily: Eristalinae
- Tribe: Milesiini
- Subtribe: Milesiina
- Genus: Milesia
- Species: M. semifulva

Binomial name
- Milesia semifulva Meijere, 1904

Synonyms
- Milesia brunnea Hervé-Bazin, 1923; Milesia decora Brunetti, 1923; Milesia gigas Guerin, 1833

Species of fly

Milesia semifulva is a species of hoverfly in the family Syrphidae.

== Distribution ==
Myanmar, India, Java, Sumatra.
