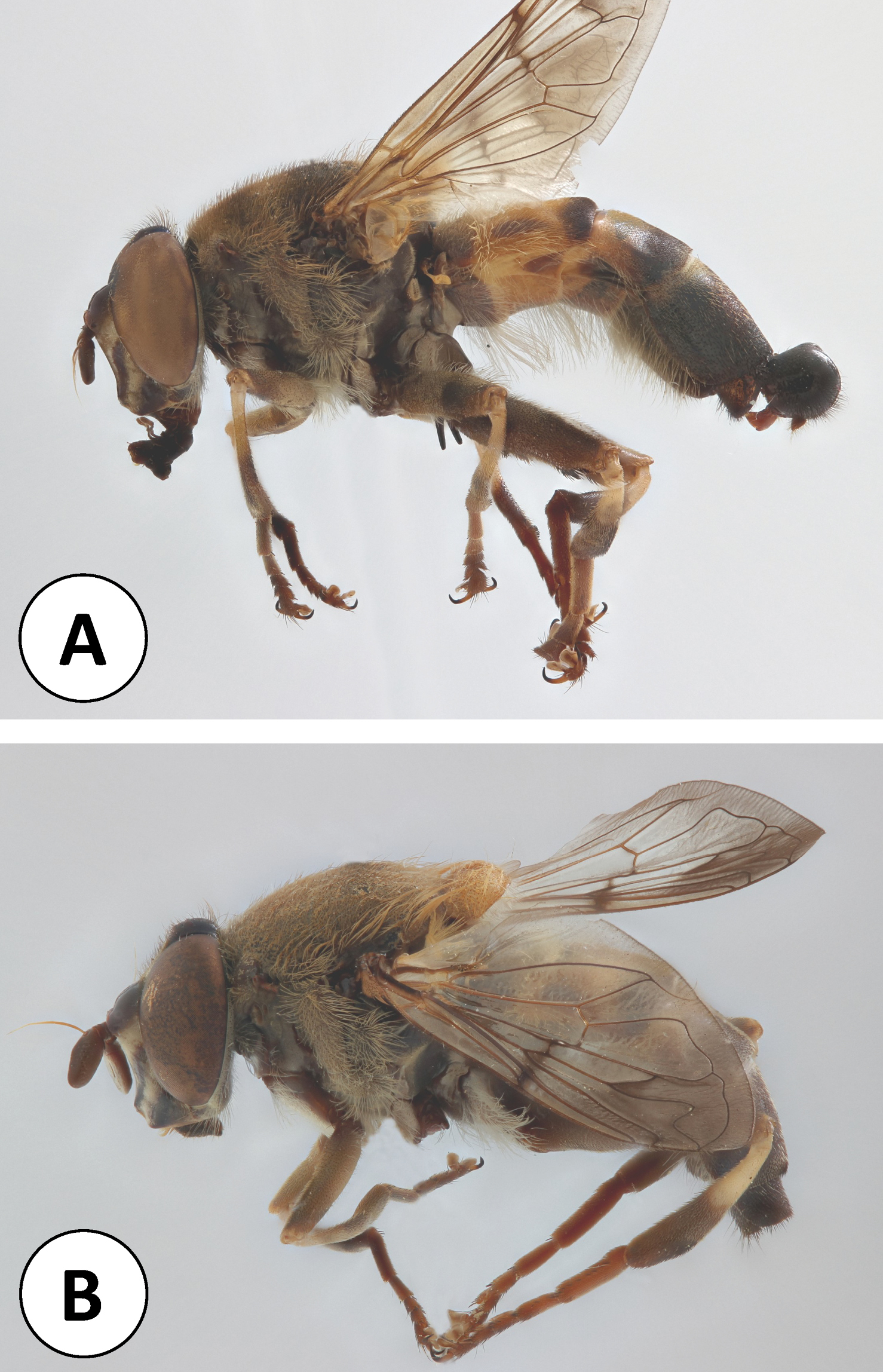
- Syrittosyrphus bee

Scientific classification
- Kingdom: Animalia
- Phylum: Arthropoda
- Clade: Pancrustacea
- Class: Insecta
- Order: Diptera
- Family: Syrphidae
- Subfamily: Eristalinae
- Tribe: Milesiini
- Subtribe: Milesiina
- Genus: Syrittosyrphus
- Species: S. opacea

Binomial name
- Syrittosyrphus opacea Hull, 1944

= Syrittosyrphus opacea =

Species of fly

Syrittosyrphus opacea is a species of hoverfly in the family Syrphidae.

== Distribution ==
South Africa.
