= Milesia confluens =

Scientific classification
- Kingdom: Animalia
- Phylum: Arthropoda
- Clade: Pancrustacea
- Class: Insecta
- Order: Diptera
- Family: Syrphidae
- Subfamily: Eristalinae
- Tribe: Milesiini
- Subtribe: Milesiina
- Genus: Milesia
- Species: M. confluens

Binomial name
- Milesia confluens Hippa, 1990

Species of fly

Milesia confluens is a species of hoverfly in the family Syrphidae.

== Distribution ==
Philippines.
