= Hemixylota unicolor =

Scientific classification
- Kingdom: Animalia
- Phylum: Arthropoda
- Class: Insecta
- Order: Diptera
- Family: Syrphidae
- Subfamily: Eristalinae
- Tribe: Milesiini
- Subtribe: Milesiina
- Genus: Hemixylota
- Species: H. unicolor

Binomial name
- Hemixylota unicolor Shannon & Aubertin, 1933

Species of fly

Hemixylota unicolor is a species of hoverfly in the family Syrphidae.

== Distribution ==
Argentina.
