= Milesia cretosa =

Scientific classification
- Kingdom: Animalia
- Phylum: Arthropoda
- Clade: Pancrustacea
- Class: Insecta
- Order: Diptera
- Family: Syrphidae
- Subfamily: Eristalinae
- Tribe: Milesiini
- Subtribe: Milesiina
- Genus: Milesia
- Species: M. cretosa

Binomial name
- Milesia cretosa Hippa, 1990

Synonyms
- Milesia tachina Yang & Cheng, 1998

Species of fly

Milesia cretosa is a species of hoverfly in the family Syrphidae.

== Distribution ==
Myanmar, India.
