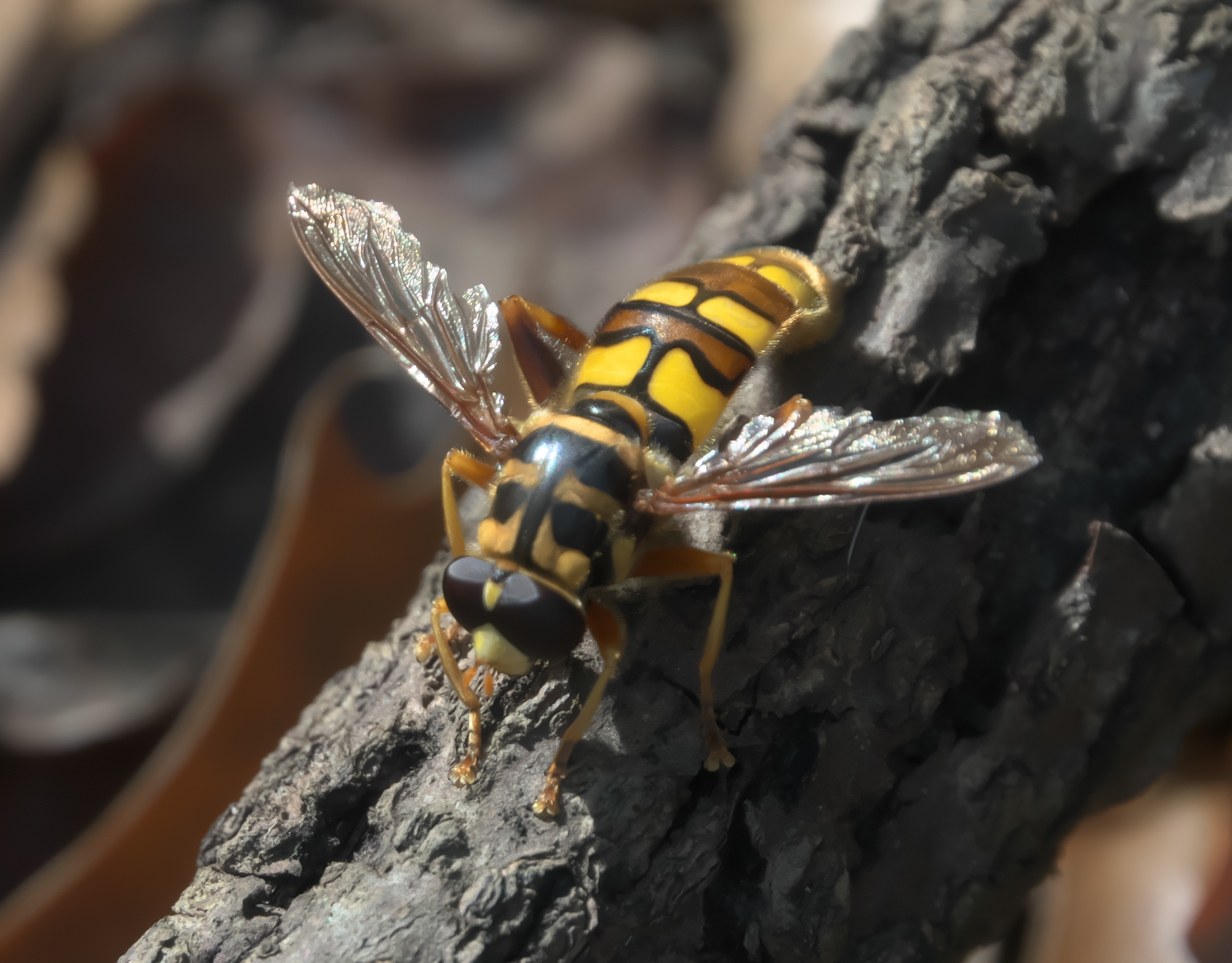

Scientific classification
- Kingdom: Animalia
- Phylum: Arthropoda
- Clade: Pancrustacea
- Class: Insecta
- Order: Diptera
- Family: Syrphidae
- Subfamily: Eristalinae
- Tribe: Milesiini
- Subtribe: Milesiina
- Genus: Milesia
- Species: M. virginiensis

Binomial name
- Milesia virginiensis (Drury, 1773)
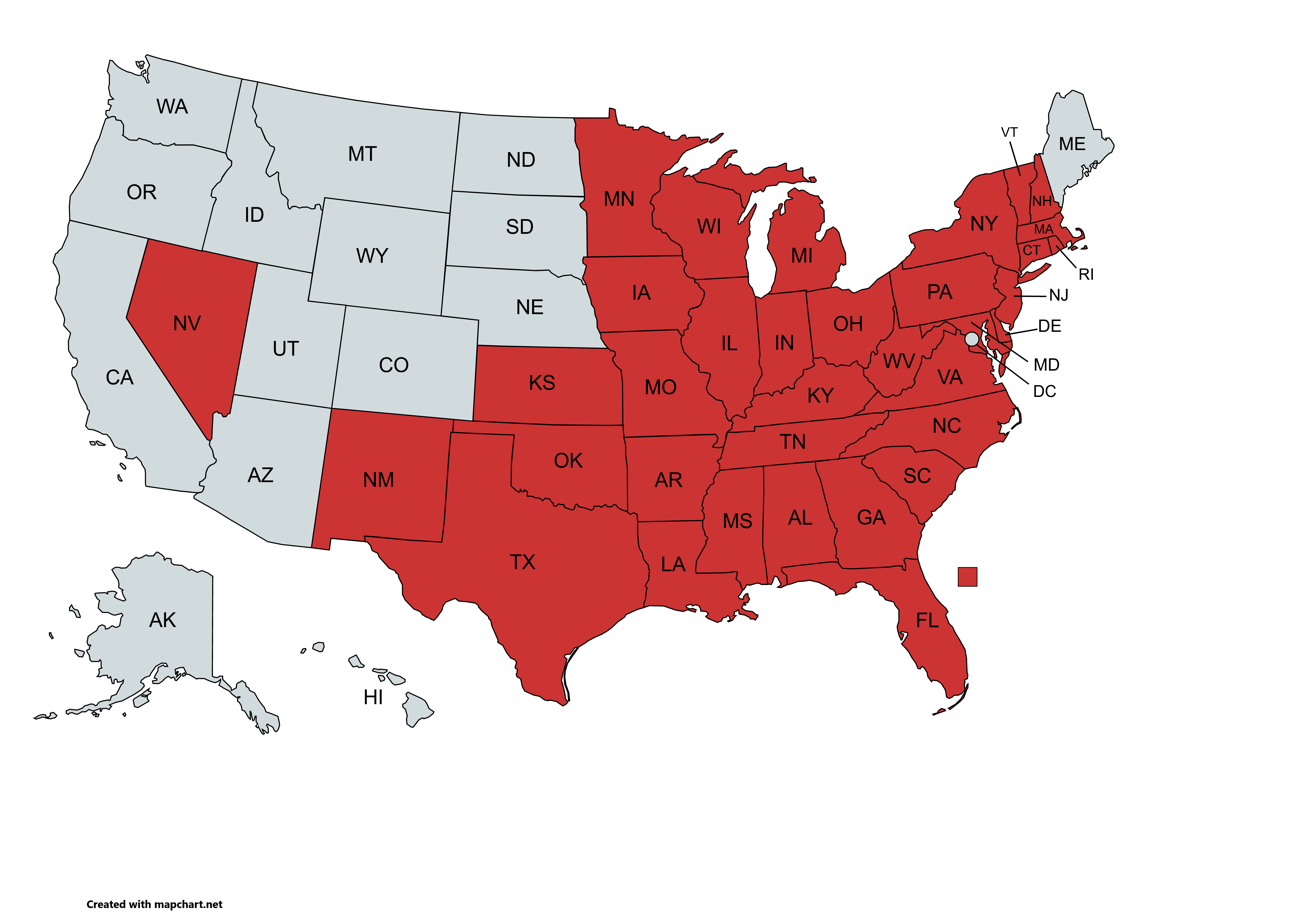
- Distribution in the United States

Synonyms
- Musca virginiensis Drury, 1773; Syrphus trifasciatus Hausmann, 1799; Milesia ornata Fabricius, 1805; Milesia limbipennis Macquart, 1850; Sphyxea fulvifrons Bigot, 1883

= Milesia virginiensis =

Species of fly

Milesia virginiensis, known generally as the yellowjacket hover fly or Virginia flower fly, is a species of hoverfly in the family Syrphidae.

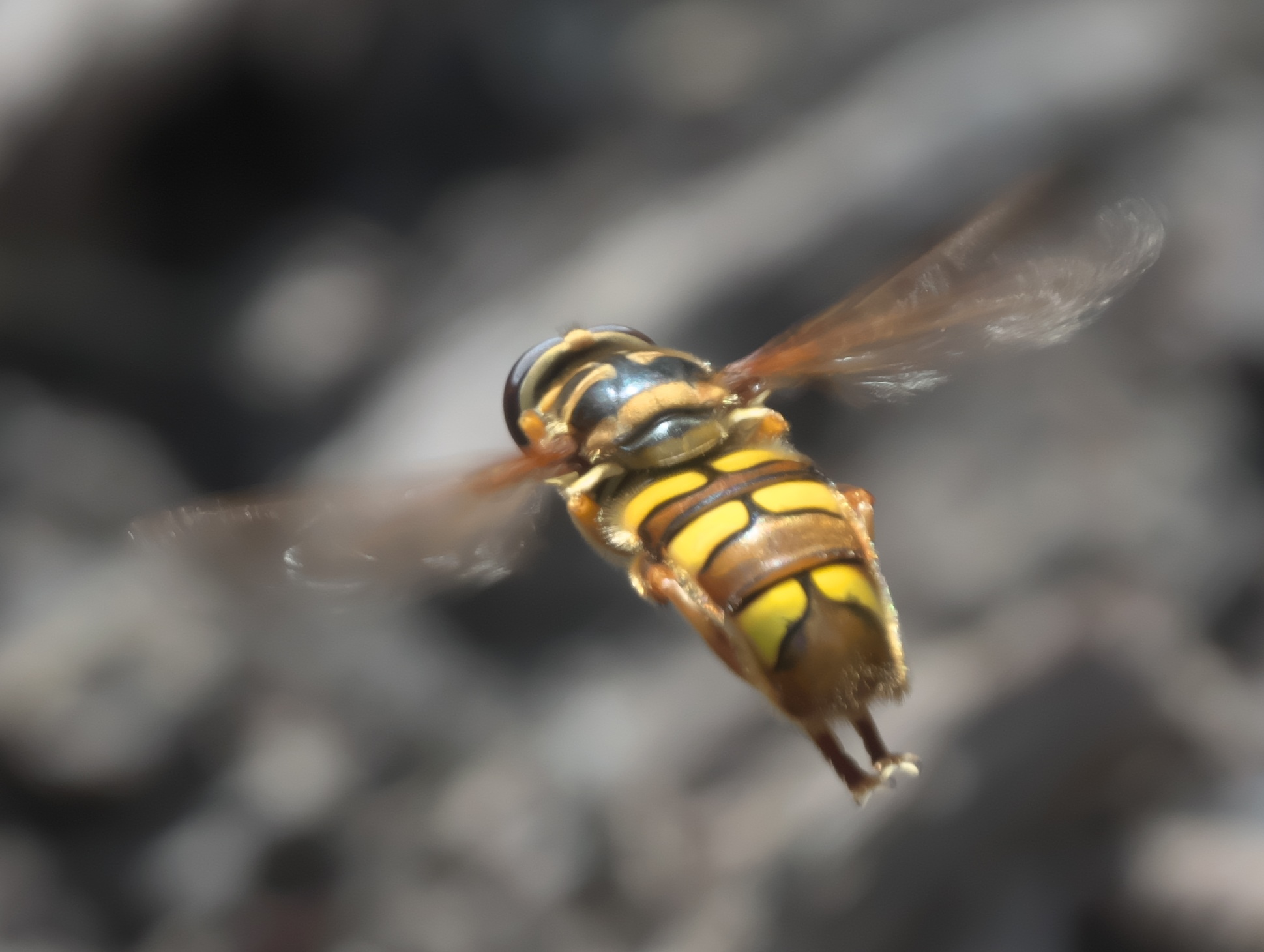
Yellowjacket hover fly, Milesia virginiensis

It measures 18–21 millimetres (0.71–0.83 in). It lives in forest edges and meadows. Adults are active mid-summer to early fall.

== Distribution ==
United States, Ontario, Canada, Mexico

== Behavior ==
Adults of milesia virginiensis feed mainly on nectar and pollen, while the larvae are mainly detritovores, feeding on decaying plant matter. Adult milesia virginiensis are often seen hovering around an area, making erratic shifting movements before flying away. Milesia virginiensis cannot sting and are completely harmless.

== Appearance ==
Milesia virginiensis mimics stinging yellow-jackets or European hornets in appearance to deter potential predators. Larvae resemble caterpillars with a narrow neck and a set of antennae.
