= Milesia scutellata =

Scientific classification
- Kingdom: Animalia
- Phylum: Arthropoda
- Clade: Pancrustacea
- Class: Insecta
- Order: Diptera
- Family: Syrphidae
- Genus: Milesia
- Species: M. scutellata

Binomial name
- Milesia scutellata Hull, 1924

Species of fly

Milesia scutellata is a species of hoverfly in the family Syrphidae.

== Distribution ==
United States.
