= Hemixylota =

Scientific classification
- Kingdom: Animalia
- Phylum: Arthropoda
- Class: Insecta
- Order: Diptera
- Family: Syrphidae
- Subfamily: Eristalinae
- Tribe: Milesiini
- Subtribe: Milesiina
- Genus: Hemixylota; Shannon & Aubertin, 1933

Type species
- Hemixylota varipes Shannon & Aubertin, 1933

Genus of flies

Hemixylota is a genus of hoverflies in the family Syrphidae.

== Species ==
- Hemixylota incerta Shannon & Aubertin, 1933
- Hemixylota unicolor Shannon & Aubertin, 1933
- Hemixylota varipes Shannon & Aubertin, 1933
