= Stilbosoma =

Scientific classification
- Kingdom: Animalia
- Phylum: Arthropoda
- Class: Insecta
- Order: Diptera
- Family: Syrphidae
- Subfamily: Eristalinae
- Tribe: Milesiini
- Subtribe: Milesiina
- Genus: Stilbosoma; Philippi, 1865

Type species
- Stilbosoma rubiceps Philippi, 1865

Genus of flies

Stilbosoma is a genus of hoverflies.

== Species ==
- Stilbosoma cyaneum Philippi, 1865
- Stilbosoma rubiceps Philippi, 1865
