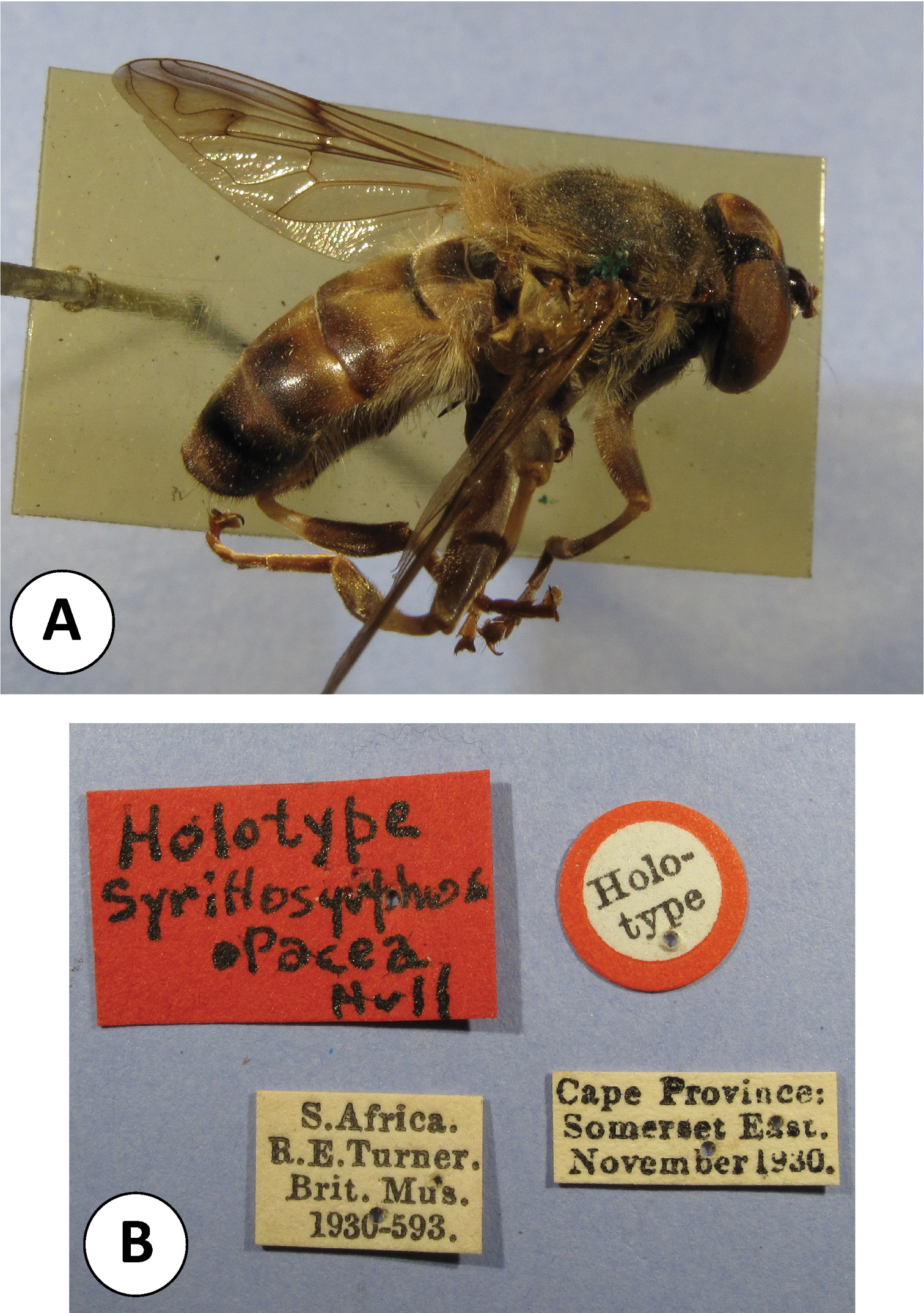
- Syrittosyrphus opacea Hull, 1944 A dorsolateral view of the male holotype B labels.

Scientific classification
- Kingdom: Animalia
- Phylum: Arthropoda
- Clade: Pancrustacea
- Class: Insecta
- Order: Diptera
- Family: Syrphidae
- Subfamily: Eristalinae
- Tribe: Milesiini
- Subtribe: Milesiina
- Genus: Syrittosyrphus; Hull, 1944

Type species
- Syrittosyrphus opacea Hull, 1944

= Syrittosyrphus =

Genus of flies

Syrittosyrphus is a genus of hoverflies from the family Syrphidae, in the order Diptera.

== Species ==
- Syrittosyrphus opacea Hull, 1944
