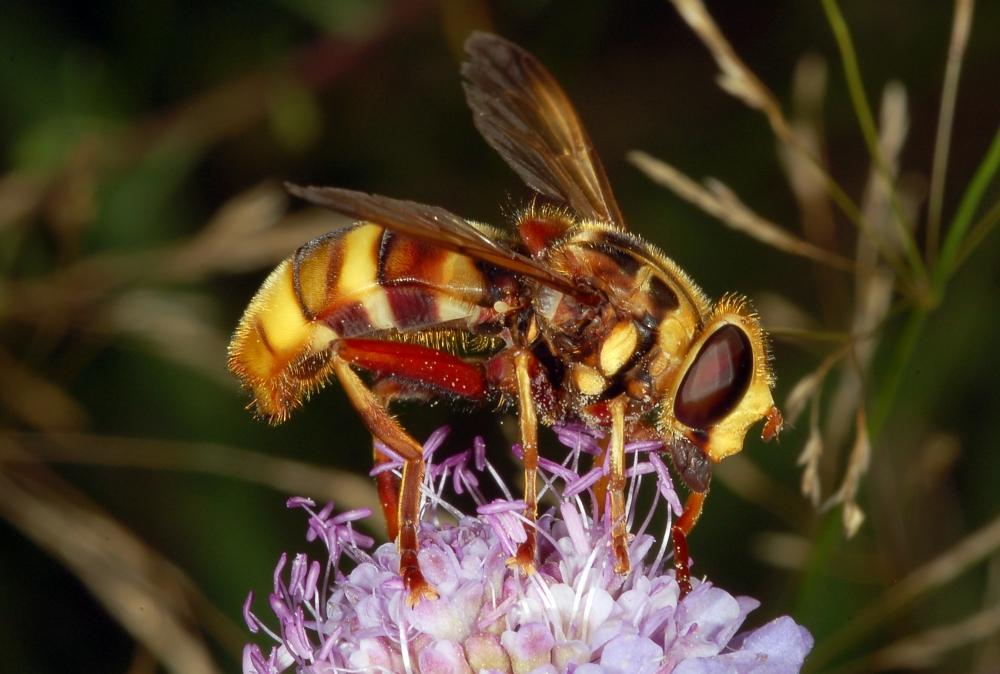
- Milesia crabroniformis

Scientific classification
- Kingdom: Animalia
- Phylum: Arthropoda
- Clade: Pancrustacea
- Class: Insecta
- Order: Diptera
- Family: Syrphidae
- Subfamily: Eristalinae
- Tribe: Milesiini
- Subtribe: Milesiina
- Genus: Milesia; Latreille, 1804

Type species
- Syrphus crabroniformis Fabricius, 1775

Synonyms
- Sphixea Rondani, 1845; Sphixaea Rondani, 1856; Sphyxaea Rondani, 1856; Sphizaea Schiner, 1864; Sphyxaea Scudder, 1882; Sphecea Bezzi, 1906; Pogonosyrphus Malloch, 1932; Sphinxea Neave, 1940

= Milesia (fly) =

Genus of flies

Milesia is a genus of very large hoverflies, which mimic social wasps. For example, the European species Milesia crabroniformis is a convincing mimic of the hornet species Vespa crabro. Milesia are predominantly Palaeotropical in distribution almost entirely Oriental.

The Larvae are of the short-tailed type, found in decaying heartwood of deciduous trees, including rot-holes.

== Species List ==
- M. afra Doesburg, 1955
- M. anthrax Hippa, 1990
- M. aperta Hippa, 1990
- M. apicalis Snellen van Vollenhoven, 1863
- M. apsycta Séguy, 1948
- M. arnoldi Malloch, 1932
- M. balteata Kertész, 1901
- M. bella Townsend, 1897
- M. bequaerti (Doesburg, 1955)
- M. bigoti Osten Sacken, 1882
- M. brunetti Herve-Bazin, 1923
- M. brunneonigra Hippa, 1990
- M. caesarea Hippa, 1990
- M. cinnamomea Hippa, 1990
- M. citrogramma Hippa, 1990
- M. collina Hippa, 1990
- M. confluens Hippa, 1990
- M. conspicienda Walker, 1859
- M. conspicua Curran, 1928
- M. crabroniformis Fabricius, 1775
- M. cretosa Hippa, 1990
- M. crinita Hippa, 1990
- M. dearmata Hippa, 1990
- M. diardi Snellen van Vollenhoven, 1863
- M. elegans Matsumura, 1916
- M. excelda Curran, 1928
- M. ferruginosa Brunetti, 1913
- M. fissipennis Speiser, 1911
- M. flavifacies Bigot, 1876
- M. fuscicosta Bigot, 1875
- M. gigantea Hippa, 1990
- M. illustris Hippa, 1990
- M. imperator Hippa, 1990
- M. insignis Hippa, 1990
- M. insistens Curran, 1931
- M. labellata Hippa, 1990
- M. lieftincki Hippa, 1990
- M. limbipennis Macquart, 1848
- M. maai Hippa, 1990
- M. macularis Wiedemann, 1824
- M. maolana Chang & Yang, 1993
- M. metallica Curran, 1931
- M. micans Hippa, 1990
- M. mima Hippa, 1990
- M. nigra Fluke, 1939
- M. nigriventris He & Chu, 1994
- M. ochracea Hippa, 1990
- M. oshimaensis Shiraki, 1930
- M. overlaeti (Doesburg, 1955)
- M. paucipunctata Yang & Cheng, 1993
- M. pendleburyi Curran, 1928
- M. pennipes Hippa, 1990
- M. plumipes Hippa, 1990
- M. prolixa Hippa, 1990
- M. pulchra Williston, 1892
- M. quantula Hippa, 1990
- M. reinwardtii Wiedemann, 1824
- M. rex Hippa, 1990
- M. ritsemae Osten Sacken, 1882
- M. scutellata Hull, 1924
- M. semifulva Meijere, 1904
- M. semiluctifera (Villers, 1789)
- M. semperi Osten Sacken, 1882
- M. sexmaculata Brunetti, 1915
- M. simulator Hippa, 1990
- M. sinensis Curran, 1925
- M. spectabilis Hippa, 1990
- M. tadzhikorum Peck & Hippa, 1988
- M. tigris Hippa, 1990
- M. titanea Hippa, 1990
- M. trilobata Hippa, 1990
- M. undulata Snellen van Vollenhoven, 1862
- M. variegata Brunetti, 1908
- M. verticalis Brunetti, 1923
- M. vespoides Walker, 1857
- M. virginiensis (Drury, 1924)
- M. yaeyamana Matsumura, 1916
- M. zamiel Walker, 1856

== gallery ==
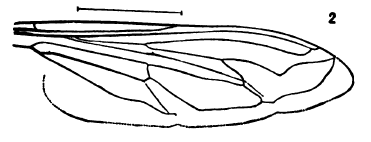
Milesia ornata wing

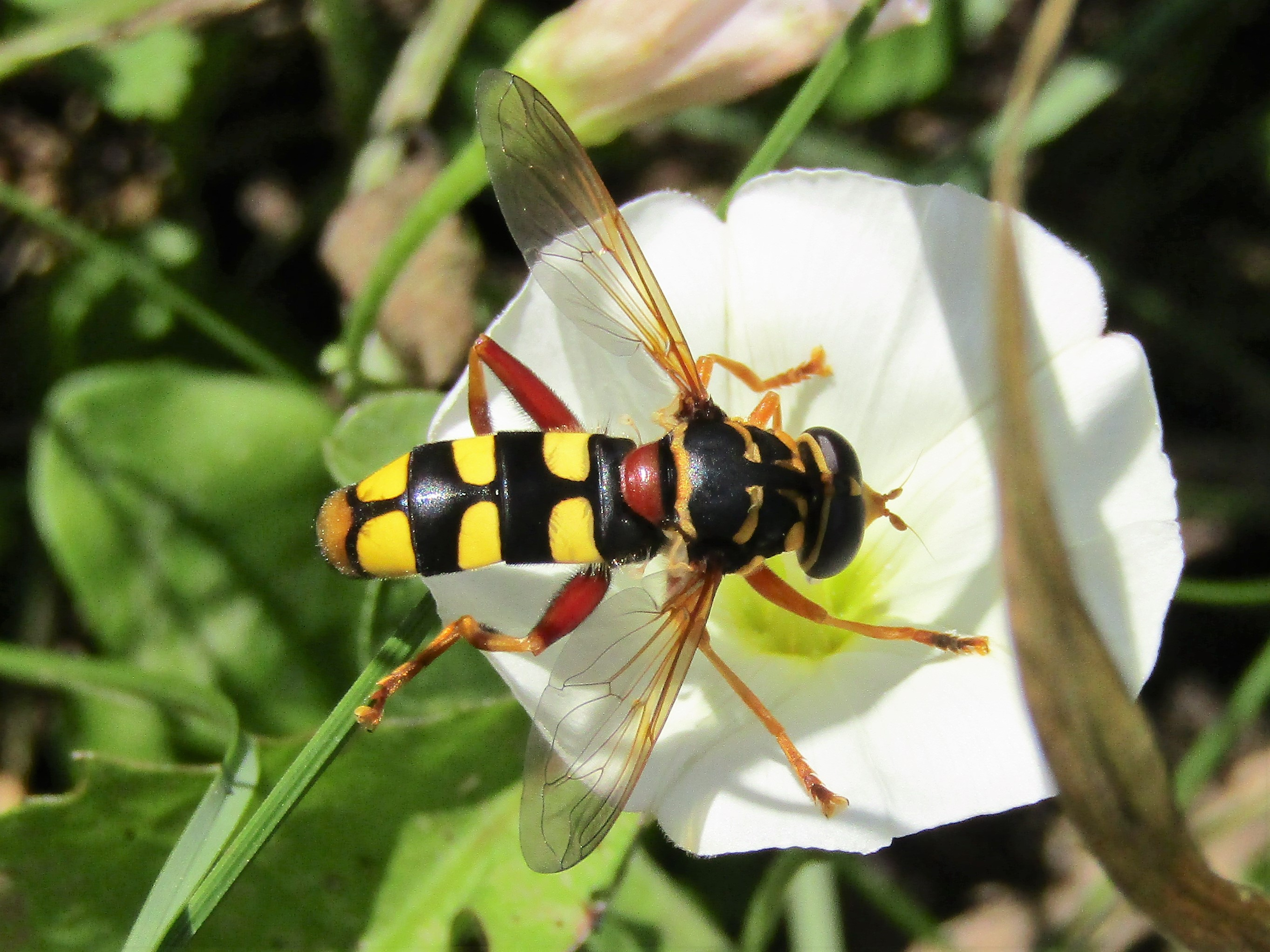
Milesia semiluctifera

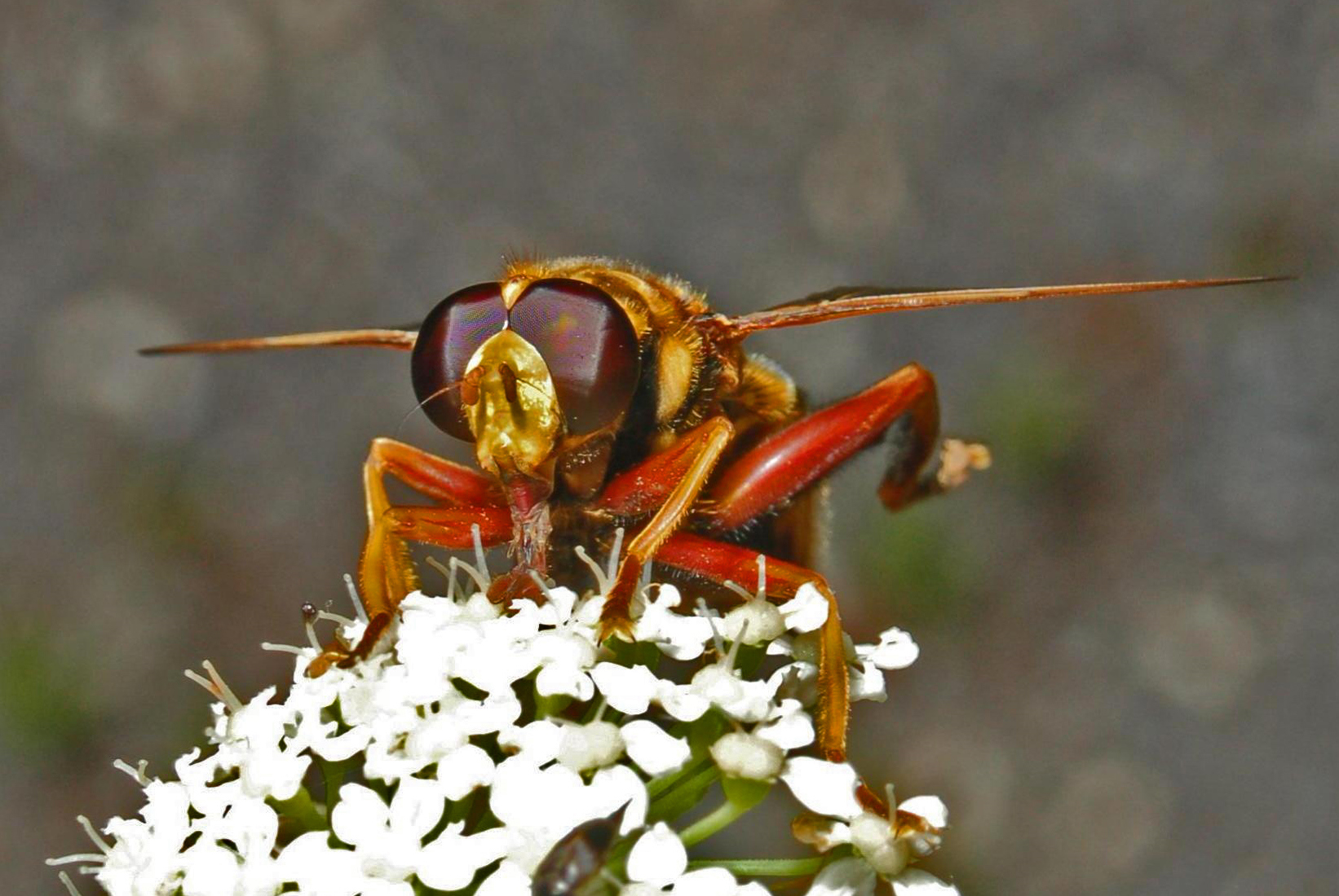
Milesia crabroniformi

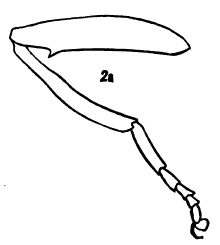
Milesia ornata hind leg

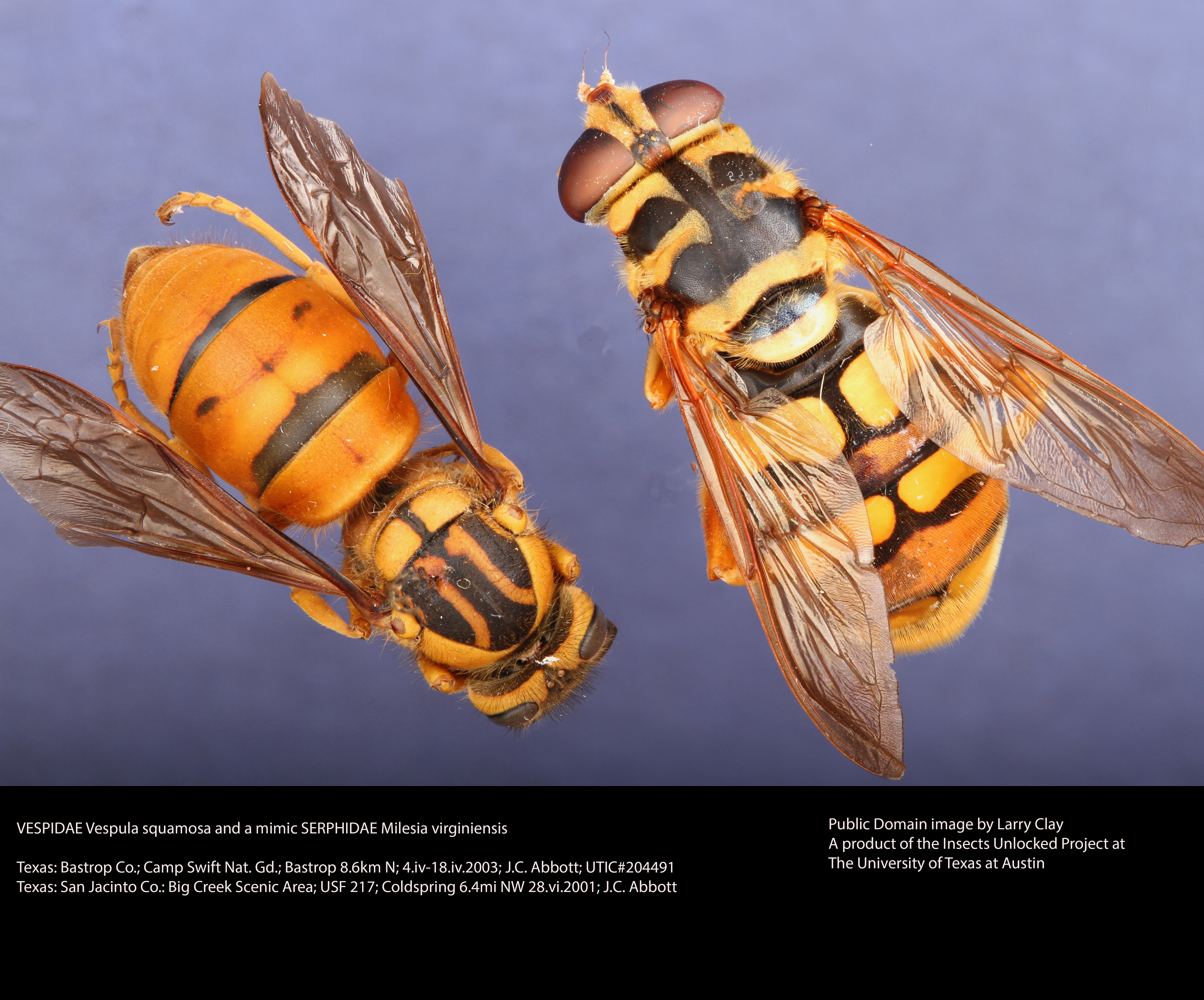
Yellow Jacket and Mimic

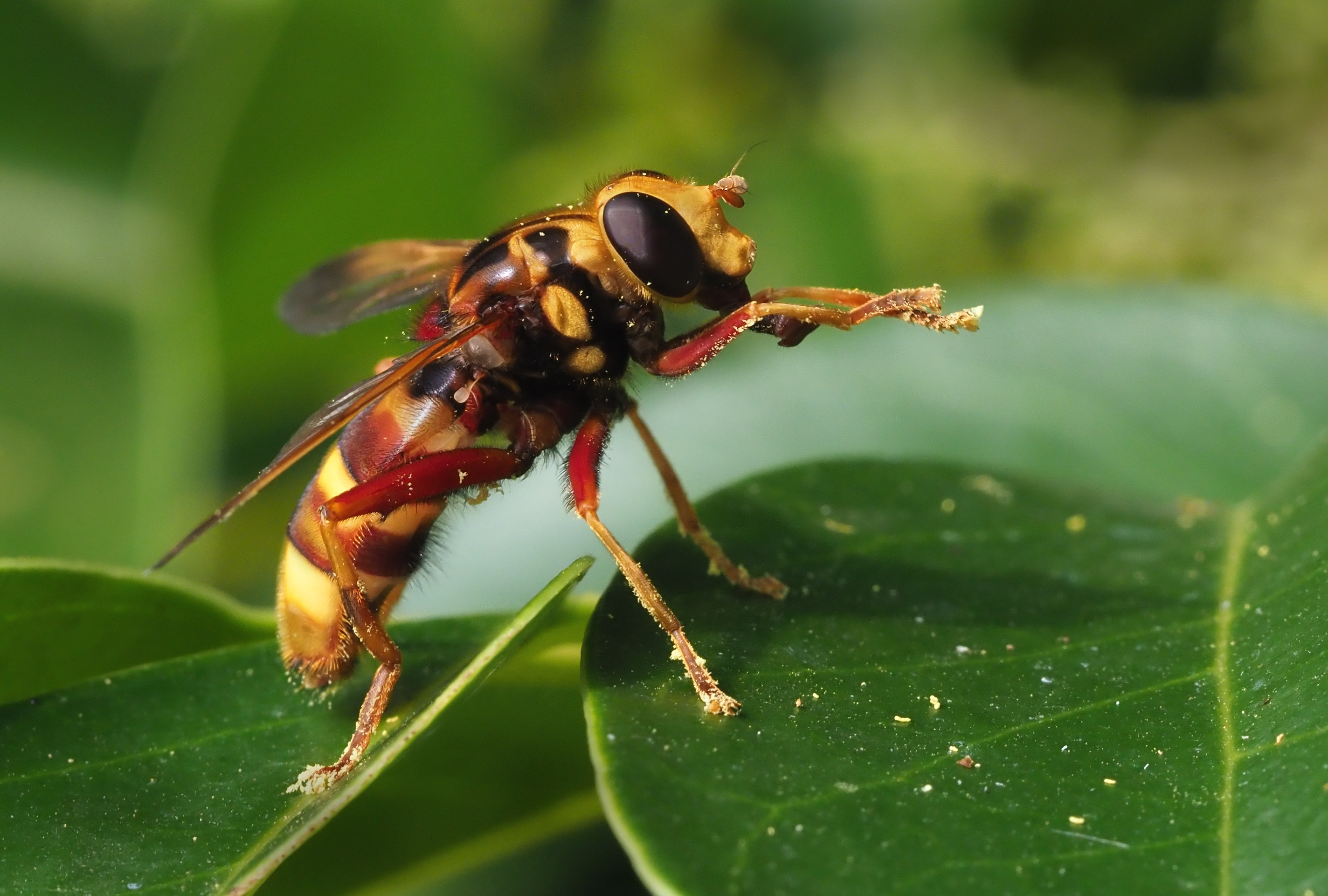
Milesia crabroniformis
