= Milesiina =

Scientific classification
- Kingdom: Animalia
- Phylum: Arthropoda
- Clade: Pancrustacea
- Class: Insecta
- Order: Diptera
- Family: Syrphidae
- Subfamily: Eristalinae
- Tribe: Milesiini
- Subtribe: Milesiina; Rondani, 1845

Subtribe of flies

Milesiina is a subtribe of syrphid flies in the family Syrphidae. There are at least 14 described species in Milesiina.

== Genera ==
- Hemixylota Williston, 1882
- Milesia Latreille, 1804
- Spilomyia Meigen, 1803
- Stilbosoma Philippi, 1865
- Syrittosyrphus Hull, 1944
